= Outline of Cameroon =

Country in Central Africa

The Flag of Cameroon

The Coat of arms of Cameroon

The location of Cameroon

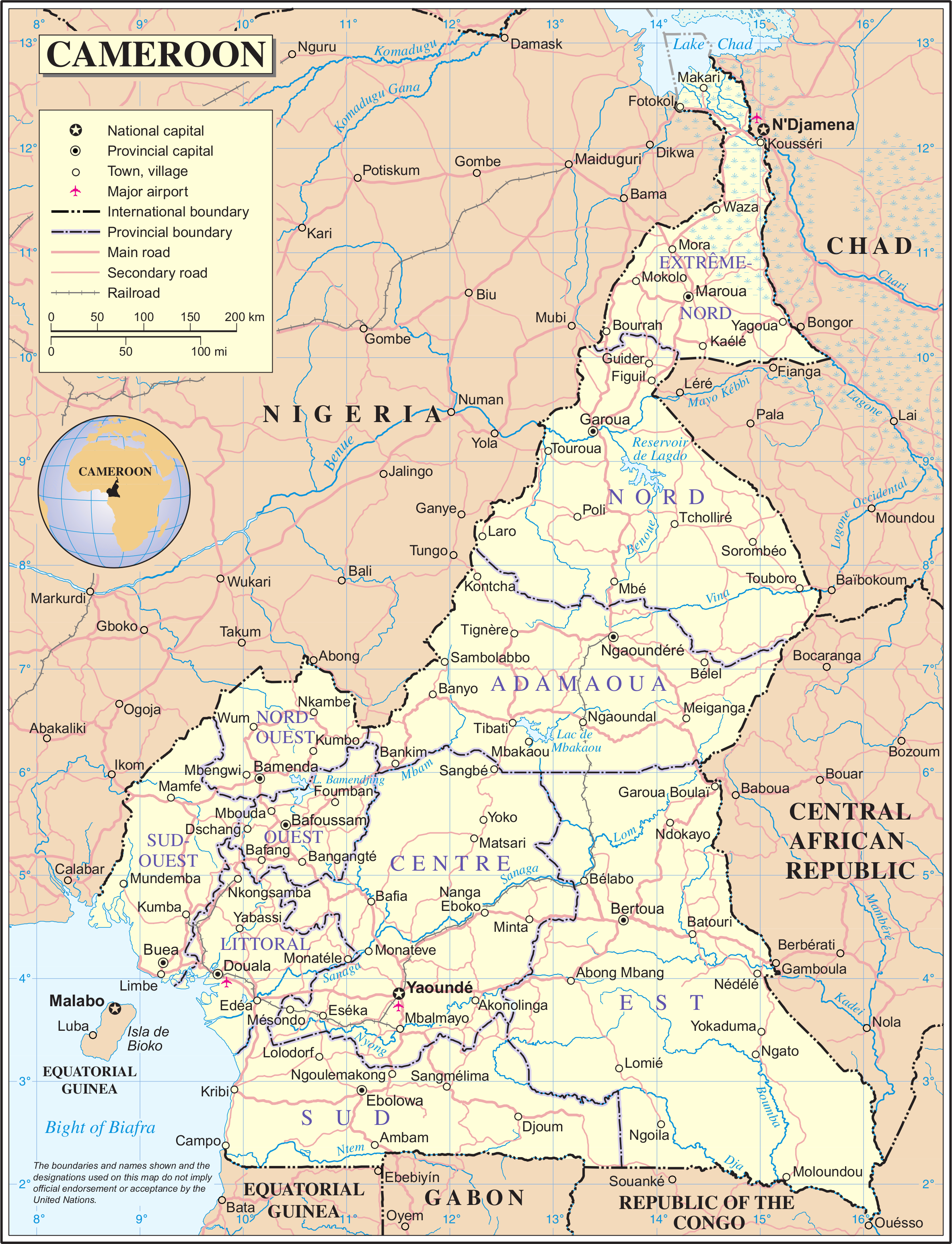
An enlargeable map of Cameroon

The following outline is provided as an overview of and topical guide to Cameroon:

Cameroon is a unitary republic located in Middle Africa. The country is called "Africa in miniature" for its geological and cultural diversity. Natural features include beaches, deserts, mountains, rainforests, and savannas. Cameroon is home to over 200 different ethnic and linguistic groups.

== General reference ==
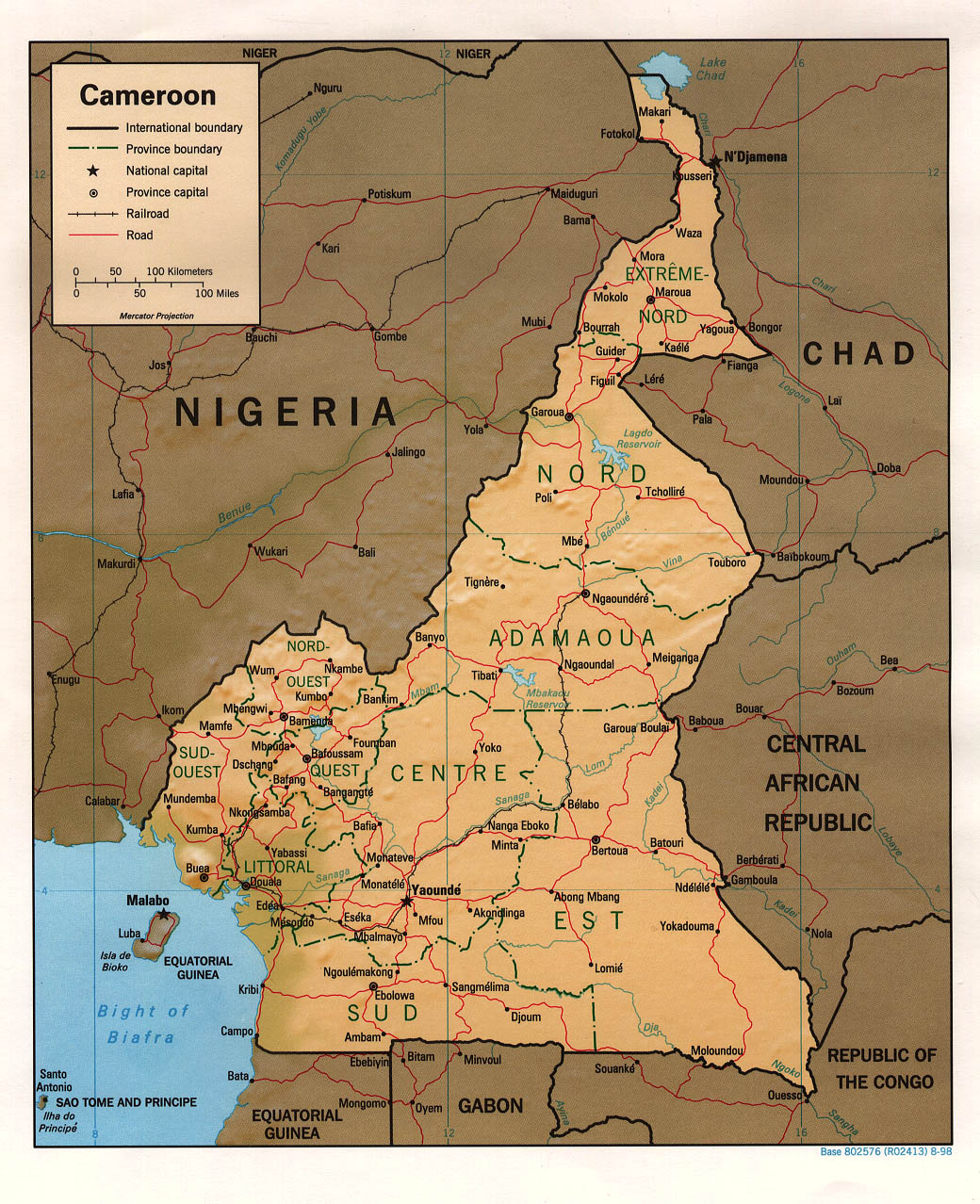
An enlargeable relief map of Cameroon

- Pronunciation:
- Common English country name: Cameroon
- Official English country name: The Republic of Cameroon
- Common endonym(s): Cameroun
- Official endonym(s): République du Cameroun
- Adjectival(s): Cameroonian
- Demonym(s): Cameroonian(s)
- International rankings of Cameroon
- ISO country codes: CM, CMR, 120
- ISO region codes: See ISO 3166-2:CM
- Internet country code top-level domain: .cm

== Geography of Cameroon ==
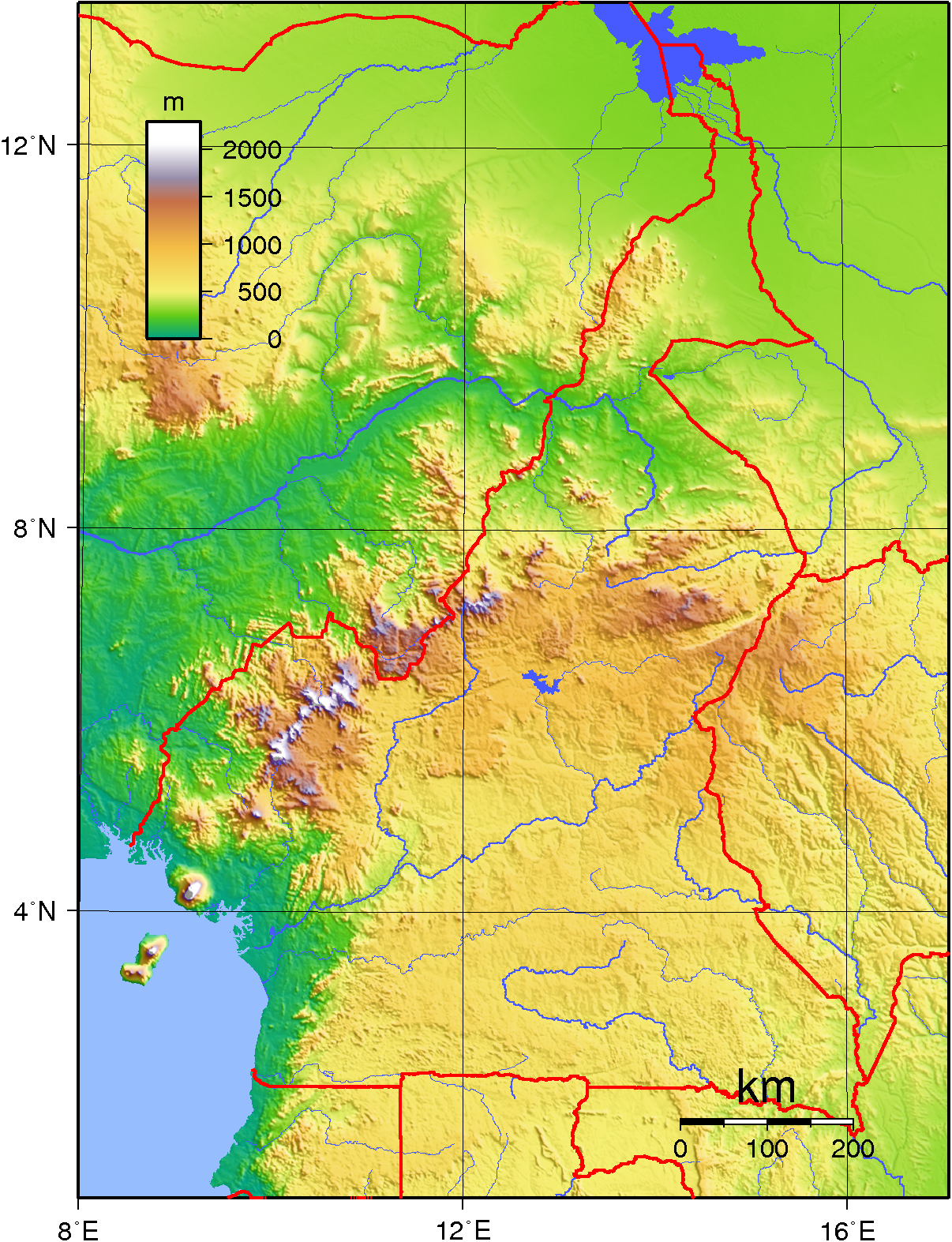
An enlargeable topographic map of Cameroon.

Geography of Cameroon

- Cameroon is: a country
- Location:
  - Northern Hemisphere and Eastern Hemisphere
  - Africa
    - Middle Africa
    - West Africa
  - Time zone: West Africa Time (UTC+01)
  - Extreme points of Cameroon
    - High: Fako on Mount Cameroon 4,040 m (13,255 ft)
    - Low: Bight of Bonny 0 m
  - Land boundaries: 4,591 km

Nigeria 1,690 km
Chad 1,094 km
Central African Republic 797 km
Republic of the Congo 523 km
Gabon 298 km
Equatorial Guinea 189 km

- Coastline: Gulf of Guinea 402 km

- Population of Cameroon: 17,795,000(2005) – 52nd most populous country
- Area of Cameroon: 475,442 square kilometres (183,569 sq mi) – 53rd largest country
- Atlas of Cameroon

=== Environment of Cameroon ===
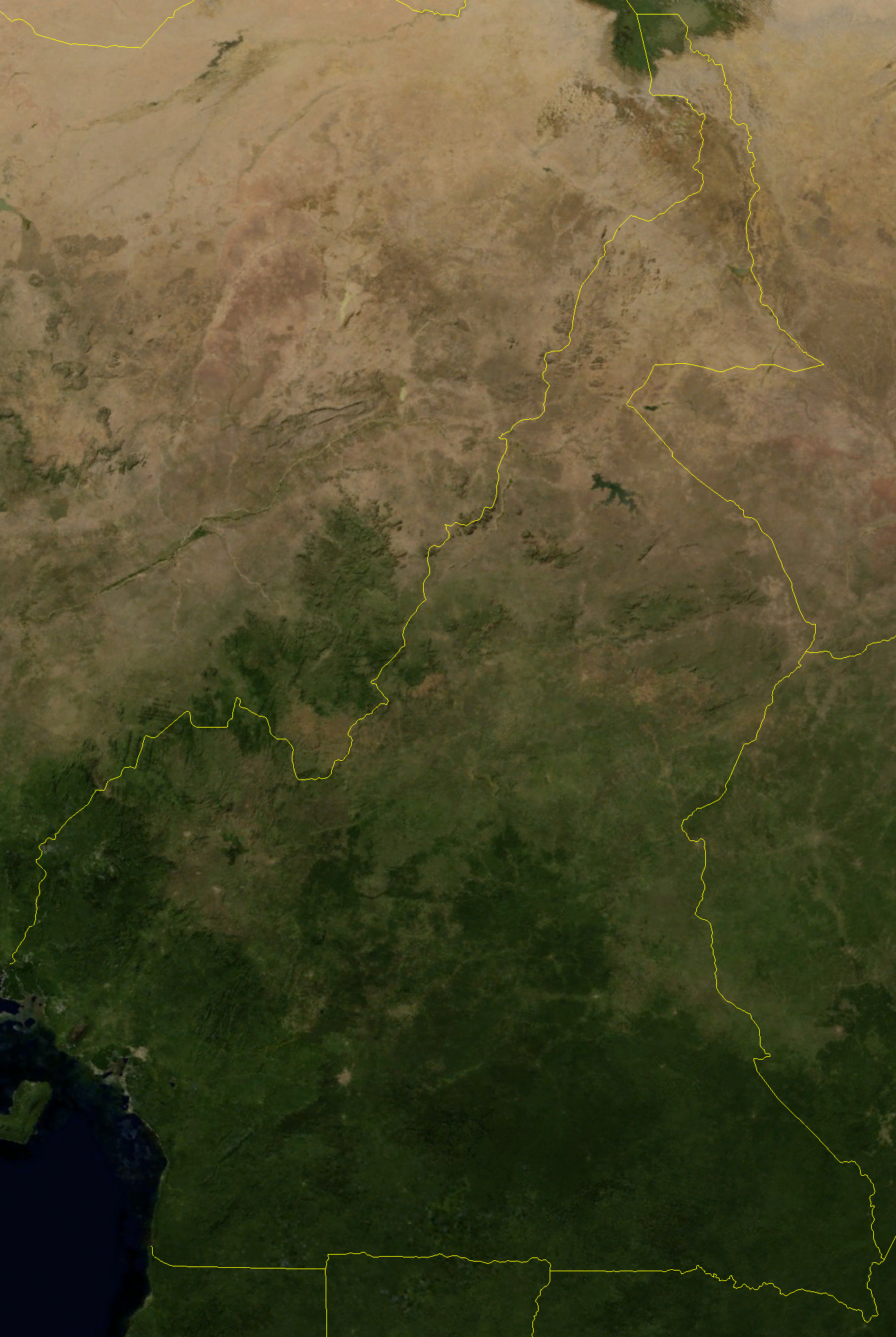
An enlargeable satellite image of Cameroon

- Climate of Cameroon
- Ecoregions in Cameroon
- Protected areas of Cameroon
  - Biosphere reserves in Cameroon
  - National parks of Cameroon
- Wildlife of Cameroon
  - Fauna of Cameroon
    - Birds of Cameroon
    - Insects of Cameroon
      - Butterflies of Cameroon
    - Mammals of Cameroon
    - Moths of Cameroon
    - Non-marine molluscs of Cameroon

==== Natural geographic features of Cameroon ====
- Glaciers in Cameroon: none
- Mountains of Cameroon
  - Volcanoes in Cameroon
- Rivers of Cameroon
- World Heritage Sites in Cameroon

=== Geographical regions of Cameroon ===
==== Ecoregions of Cameroon ====
List of ecoregions in Cameroon

==== Administrative divisions of Cameroon ====
Subdivisions of Cameroon

- Regions of Cameroon (formerly named "Provinces")
  - Departments of Cameroon
    - Communes of Cameroon

Regions of Cameroon

- Adamawa
- Centre
- East
- Far North
- Littoral
- North
- Northwest
- South
- Southwest
- West

Departments of Cameroon

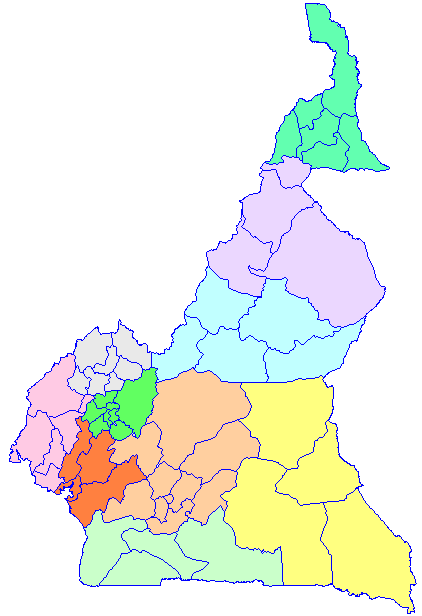

the Regions of Cameroon are divided into 58 divisions or departments (départements)

Communes of Cameroon

- Municipalities of Cameroon
- Capital of Cameroon: Yaoundé

=== Demography of Cameroon ===
Demographics of Cameroon

== Government and politics of Cameroon ==
Politics of Cameroon

- Form of government: unitary presidential republic
- Capital of Cameroon: Yaoundé
- Economic crisis of Cameroon
- Elections in Cameroon
- Political parties in Cameroon

=== Branches of government ===
Government of Cameroon

==== Executive branch of the government of Cameroon ====
- Head of state: Paul Biya, President of Cameroon
  - List of heads of state of Cameroon
  - List of first ladies of Cameroon
  - Vice President of Cameroon
- Head of government: Joseph Ngute, Prime Minister of Cameroon
  - List of heads of government of Cameroon
- Cabinet of Cameroon

==== Legislative branch of the government of Cameroon ====
- National Assembly of Cameroon (unicameral)
  - List of presidents of the National Assembly of Cameroon

==== Judicial branch of the government of Cameroon ====
Court system of Cameroon

- Supreme Court of Cameroon
  - High Court of Justice of Cameroon
  - Court of Appeal of Cameroon

=== Foreign relations of Cameroon ===
Foreign relations of Cameroon

- Diplomatic missions in Cameroon
- Diplomatic missions of Cameroon

==== International organization membership ====
The Republic of Cameroon is a member of:

- African, Caribbean, and Pacific Group of States (ACP)
- African Development Bank Group (AfDB)
- African Union (AU)
- Commonwealth of Nations
- Conference des Ministres des Finances des Pays de la Zone Franc (FZ)
- Development Bank of Central African States (BDEAC)
- Economic and Monetary Community of Central Africa (CEMAC)
- Food and Agriculture Organization (FAO)
- Group of 77 (G77)
- International Atomic Energy Agency (IAEA)
- International Bank for Reconstruction and Development (IBRD)
- International Chamber of Commerce (ICC)
- International Civil Aviation Organization (ICAO)
- International Criminal Court (ICCt) (signatory)
- International Criminal Police Organization (Interpol)
- International Development Association (IDA)
- International Federation of Red Cross and Red Crescent Societies (IFRCS)
- International Finance Corporation (IFC)
- International Fund for Agricultural Development (IFAD)
- International Labour Organization (ILO)
- International Maritime Organization (IMO)
- International Mobile Satellite Organization (IMSO)
- International Monetary Fund (IMF)
- International Olympic Committee (IOC)
- International Organization for Migration (IOM)
- International Organization for Standardization (ISO) (correspondent)
- International Red Cross and Red Crescent Movement (ICRM)
- International Telecommunication Union (ITU)
- International Telecommunications Satellite Organization (ITSO)
- International Trade Union Confederation (ITUC)
- Inter-Parliamentary Union (IPU)
- Islamic Development Bank (IDB)
- Multilateral Investment Guarantee Agency (MIGA)
- Nonaligned Movement (NAM)
- Organisation internationale de la Francophonie (OIF)
- Organisation of Islamic Cooperation (OIC)
- Organisation for the Prohibition of Chemical Weapons (OPCW)
- Permanent Court of Arbitration (PCA)
- United Nations (UN)
- United Nations Conference on Trade and Development (UNCTAD)
- United Nations Educational, Scientific, and Cultural Organization (UNESCO)
- United Nations Industrial Development Organization (UNIDO)
- Universal Postal Union (UPU)
- World Confederation of Labour (WCL)
- World Customs Organization (WCO)
- World Federation of Trade Unions (WFTU)
- World Health Organization (WHO)
- World Intellectual Property Organization (WIPO)
- World Meteorological Organization (WMO)
- World Tourism Organization (UNWTO)
- World Trade Organization (WTO)

=== Law and order in Cameroon ===
Law of Cameroon

- Constitution of Cameroon
- Crime in Cameroon
  - Human trafficking in Cameroon
  - Prostitution in Cameroon
- Human rights in Cameroon
  - LGBT rights in Cameroon
  - Freedom of religion in Cameroon
  - Polygamy in Cameroon – it's legal
- Law enforcement in Cameroon

=== Military of Cameroon ===
Military of Cameroon

- Command
  - Commander-in-chief:
- Forces
  - Army of Cameroon
  - Navy of Cameroon
  - Air Force of Cameroon

=== Local government in Cameroon ===
Local government in Cameroon

- Regional Council (Cameroon)

== History of Cameroon ==
History of Cameroon

- Current events of Cameroon
- History of Cameroon by period
  - Reunification of Cameroon
- History of Cameroon by region
- History of Cameroon by subject
  - History of rail transport in Cameroon

== Culture of Cameroon ==
Culture of Cameroon

- Architecture of Cameroon
  - Musgum mud huts
- Cuisine of Cameroon
- Languages of Cameroon
  - General Alphabet of Cameroon Languages
- Museums in Cameroon
- National symbols of Cameroon
  - Coat of arms of Cameroon
  - Flag of Cameroon
  - National anthem of Cameroon
- People of Cameroon
  - Ethnic groups in Cameroon
    - Chinese people in Cameroon
  - List of Cameroonians
- Prostitution in Cameroon
- Public holidays in Cameroon
- Scouting and Guiding in Cameroon
- World Heritage Sites in Cameroon

=== Art in Cameroon ===
Art in Cameroon

- List of Cameroonian artists
- Cinema of Cameroon
  - List of Cameroonian films
- Dance in Cameroon
- Literature of Cameroon
- Music of Cameroon

=== Religion in Cameroon ===
Religion in Cameroon

- Cathedrals in Cameroon
- Freedom of religion in Cameroon
- Religions in Cameroon
  - Bahá'í Faith in Cameroon
  - Christianity in Cameroon
    - Evangelical Church of Cameroon
    - Evangelical Lutheran Church of Cameroon
    - National Episcopal Conference of Cameroon
    - Orthodox Presbyterian Church in Cameroon
    - Presbyterian Church in Cameroon
    - Roman Catholicism in Cameroon
      - List of Roman Catholic dioceses in Cameroon
  - Hinduism in Cameroon
  - Islam in Cameroon

=== Sports in Cameroon ===
Sport in Cameroon

- Football in Cameroon
  - Football clubs in Cameroon
- Cameroon at the Olympics
- Rugby union in Cameroon

== Economy and infrastructure of Cameroon ==
Economy of Cameroon

- Economic rank, by nominal GDP (2025): 87th (eighty-seventh)
- Agriculture in Cameroon
- Banking in Cameroon
  - Banks in Cameroon
    - Union Bank of Cameroon
- Communications in Cameroon
  - Media of Cameroon
  - Postal service in Cameroon
    - Postage stamps and postal history of Cameroon
  - Telecommunications in Cameroon
    - Telephone numbers in Cameroon
    - Internet in Cameroon
- Companies of Cameroon
- Currency of Cameroon: Franc
  - ISO 4217: XAF
- Economic crisis of Cameroon
- Energy in Cameroon
  - Power stations in Cameroon
  - Privatization of the electricity sector in Cameroon
- Health care in Cameroon
  - Hospitals in Cameroon
- Mining in Cameroon
- Spatial Development in Cameroon
- Tourism in Cameroon
- Trade unions in Cameroon
  - Confederation of Cameroon Trade Unions
  - Union of Free Trade Unions of Cameroon
- Transport in Cameroon
  - Air transport in Cameroon
    - Airports in Cameroon
  - Rail transport in Cameroon
    - History of rail transport in Cameroon
    - Railway stations in Cameroon

== Education in Cameroon ==
Education in Cameroon

- National Library of Cameroon
- Universities in Cameroon
  - American Institute of Cameroon, Ndop
  - International University, Bamenda
  - University of Buea
  - University of Bamenda
  - University of Douala
  - University of Dschang
  - University of Ngaoundere
  - Universite des Montagnes (Highlands University)
  - University of Maroua
  - University of Yaounde (two campuses)
  - The International Relations Institute of Cameroon – IRIC (yaounde)
  - Siantou and Ndi Samba Schools of Higher Learning (Yaounde)
  - Catholic University of Cameroon, Bamenda (Bamenda)

== Health in Cameroon ==
Health in Cameroon

== See also ==
Cameroon

- List of international rankings
- Member state of the Commonwealth of Nations
- Member state of the United Nations
- Outline of Africa
- Outline of geography
- Beba Village Community in Cameroon
- Catholic University of Cameroon, Bamenda
- Embassy of Cameroon, Washington, D.C.
- International Relations Institute of Cameroon
- Union of the Peoples of Cameroon
- List of municipalities of Cameroon
