= Natali Kossoumna Liba'a =

Cameroonian geographer and professor

- Born: 1973 (age 52–53); Cameroon
- Citizenship: Cameroonian
- Education: Université Paul Valéry Montpellier III
- Title: Professeur titulaire des Universités, Université de Maroua, Cameroun

Natali Kossoumna Liba'a is a Cameroonian geographer and university professor. He teaches in the Department of Geography of the Ecole Normale Supérieure of the University of Maroua. Author of several books, he is also a specialist in the management of rural territories and natural resources, marginalities, ethnic minorities and pastoralism.

== Biography ==
Natali Kossoumna Liba'a was born in 1973 in Cameroon. A graduate of the Paul Valéry Montpellier III University in France, he obtained his PhD in Geography in 2008 and the accreditation to supervise research in 2014. Author of several scientific publications, he is the author of the Kossoumnian theory of the sedentarization cycle of nomads in the Sudano-Sahelian zone of Africa. He also wrote a collection of satirical poems and short stories entitled The Bastards-Les Salauds. He is Professeur titulaire des Universités, Université de Maroua, Cameroun.

== Publications ==
  - Kossoumna Liba'a N., and Nguiffo S. 2023. Land in Cameroon, the urgency of reforms, Langaa Research & Publishing CIG, Mankon, Bamenda, 292 p.
  - Ganota B., Baska Toussia D. V. and Kossoumna Liba'a N. (eds). 2019. Water and Development in the Sudano-Sahelian Environment of Central Africa: Environmental, Health and Geopolitical Analyses, Editions Dinimber & Larimber, Yaoundé, Yaoundé, 317 p.
  - Kossoumna Liba'a N., Dili Palai C (eds). 2018. G Genre, savoirs et dynamique de développement au Cameroun: pour une valorisation des potentialités locales, Yaoundé, 260p.
  - Kossoumna Liba'a N. 2017. The end of pastoral nomadism? Crises in livestock territories in Northern Cameroon. Dinimber & Larimber Editions, Yaoundé, 190p.
  - Kossoumna Liba'a N., Djiangoue B., Wanie C. M (eds). 2017. Risks and Disasters in the Sudano-Sahelian Zone of Cameroon: Hazards, Vulnerabilities and Resilience, Editions Cheikh Anta Diop, Douala, 312p.
  - Watang Zieba F., Kossoumna Liba'a N., Gonne B (eds). 2016. Pressures on territories and natural resources in Northern Cameroon: Environmental and health issues, CLE, Yaoundé, 285p.
  - Kossoumna Liba'a N. 2014. Les salauds, Recueil de poèmes, Generis, Paris, 119 p.
  - Kossoumna Liba'a N. 2014. Crises in the cotton sector in Cameroon: foundations and adaptation strategies of actors, CLE Editions, Yaoundé, 426p.
  - Kossoumna Liba'a N. 2012. Les éleveurs mbororo du Nord-Cameroun de Natali Kossoumna Liba'a - Decitre, Éditions de L'Harmattan, Paris, 272p.
