= Education in Cameroon =

National education budget (2011)
- Budget: 3.7% of GDP

General details
- Primary languages: French and English

Literacy (2020)
- Male: 83.4%
- Female: 73.1%

Cameroon is a Central African nation on the Gulf of Guinea. Bantu speakers were among the first groups to settle Cameroon, followed by the Muslim Fulani until German domination in 1884. After World War I, the French took over 80% of the area, and the British 20%. After World War II, self-government was granted, and in 1972, a unitary republic was formed out of East and West Cameroon. Until 1976, there were two separate education systems, French and English, which did not merge seamlessly. English and French are now considered the primary languages of instruction, with English being more preferred. Local languages are generally not taught as there are too many, and choosing between them would raise further issues.

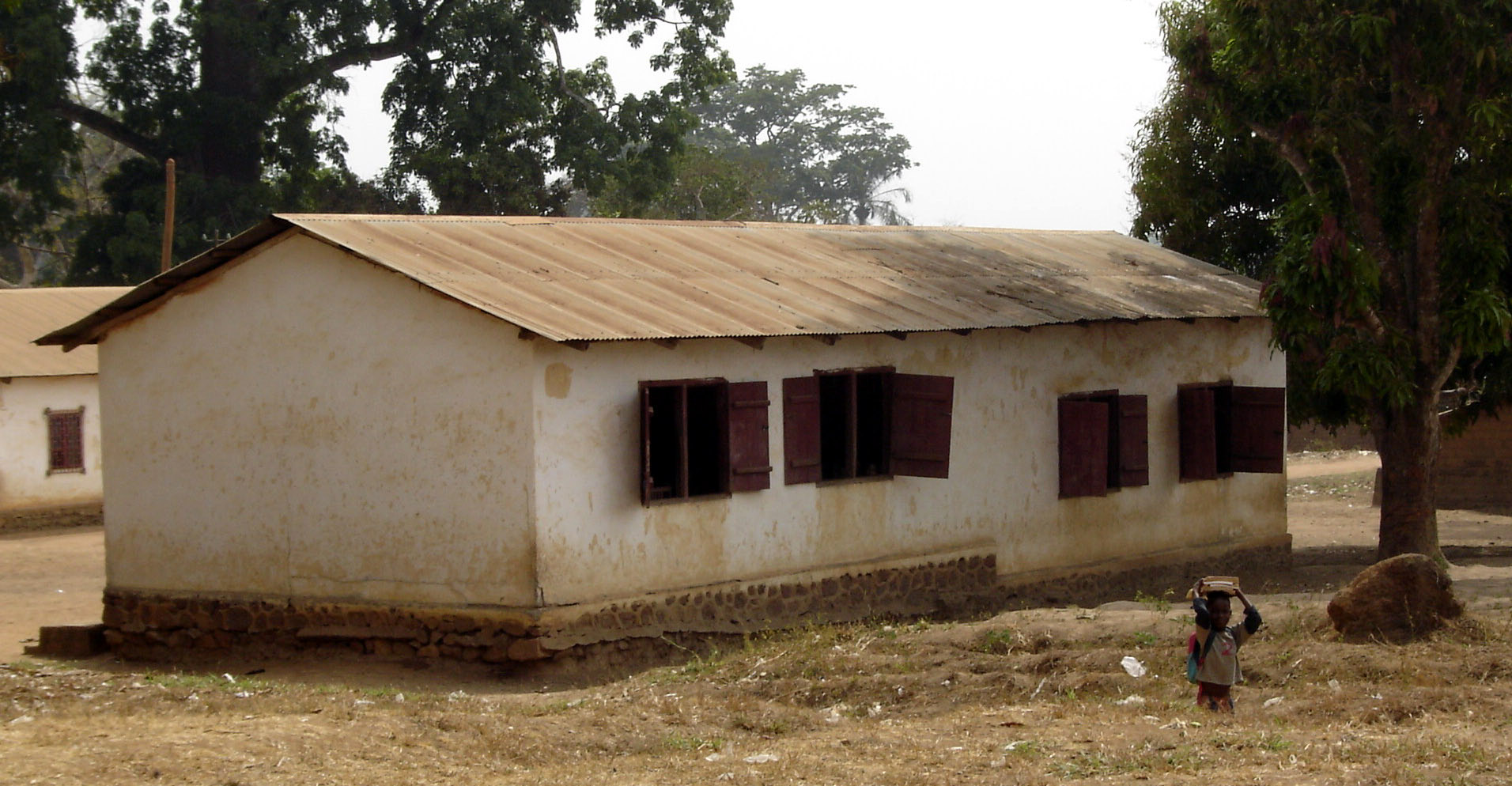
Schoolhouse in Bankim, Cameroon

Christian mission schools have played a significant role in educating children whose parents can afford them. But most cannot. Primary schooling has been free since 2000, but these are very basic, overcrowded, and parents must pay for all sundries. A 2004 government study found that elementary schools only had enough seats for 1.8 million students, with an attendance of 2.9 million. There are fewer girls than boys, mainly due to such things as early marriage, pregnancy, domestic chores, and traditional biases. On the back of this, the Cameroonian government launched a programme of construction and renewal, but with limited success. Corruption is still a problem, and facilities remain basic. Most schools have working toilets, access to a water tap, or enough tables and benches for students. Teachers are highly trained and highly motivated. Secondary schools are expensive, and there are both state-run and private universities.

The Human Rights Measurement Initiative (HRMI) finds that Cameroon is fulfilling only 73.0% of what it should be fulfilling for the right to education based on the country's level of income. HRMI breaks down the right to education by looking at the rights to both primary education and secondary education. While taking into consideration Cameroon's income level, the nation is achieving 90.6% of what should be possible based on its resources (income) for primary education, but only 55.3% for secondary education.

== Background ==
Two separate systems of education were used in Cameroon after independence: East Cameroon's system was based on the French model, West Cameroon's on the British model. Uniting the two systems was deemed a symbol of national integration between West and East Cameroon. The two systems were merged by 1976, but studies suggest that they did not blend well. Shortly after independence, French was considered the main language of the country, but with the rise of English as a lingua franca, the balance switched to the latter. Christian mission schools have been an important part of the education system, but most children cannot afford them and are forced to choose state-run schools. Education became compulsory up to the age of 12 years, when 6 years of primary schooling are complete. Education is free, but parents have to pay for uniforms, books, and sometimes even anti-malaria prophylaxis for pupils. Tertiary-level students received money monthly back in the days of President Amadou Ahidjo and for the first few years of President Paul Biya. Tuition fees at the secondary school level are high and unaffordable for many families. The country has institutions for teacher training and technical education. There is, however, a growing trend for the wealthiest and best-educated students to leave the country to study and live abroad.

=== Legislation ===
The Constitution affirms that "the State shall guarantee the child’s right to education [and that] primary education shall be compulsory"; however, the government avoided human rights language and referred only to "equality of opportunity for access to education".

== Statistics ==
Literacy rate % by region 90-100 80-90 70-80 60-70 50-60 40-50 below 40

General information	Statistics
Expected years of schooling (on average)	12 yrs
Adult literacy rate (people aged 15 and more, both sexes)	71.3%
Mean years of schooling (adults)	5.9 yrs
Education index	520
Combined gross enrolment in education (both sexes)	60.4

According to data available for 2011, 47.7% of girls and 56.7% of boys attended primary school. The low school enrolment rate was attributed to cost, with girls' participation further reduced by early marriage, sexual harassment, unwanted pregnancy, domestic responsibilities, and certain socio-cultural biases. Domestic workers are generally not permitted by their employers to attend school. A 2004 government study found there is a large gap between the capacity of the schools and the number of potential students. According to the study, preschools served only 16% of the potential student population. Within the school system, the northern provinces were the most underprivileged, with only 5.7% of all teachers working in the Adamawa, North, and Extreme North provinces combined. The study showed that elementary schools only had enough seats for 1.8 million students, although 2.9 million attended school. After these findings, the Cameroonian government launched a three-year programme to construct and renovate schools, improve teacher competency, and provide instructional materials, which was renewed in 2010. Still problems are not to be considered resolved: embezzlement of education funds is considered the main problem in primary education; half of the state primary schools in the sample reported problems with their buildings (only 19% of schools have working toilets, 30% have access to a water tap, and barely 30% have enough tables and benches for students); absenteeism of teachers and poor implementation and enforcement of rules and regulations.

== Structure of the educational system ==
The educational system in Cameroon is divided into primary (six years, compulsory), secondary (five years), high school (two years), and tertiary (University).

The academic year runs from September to June, at which time, end-of-year examinations are taken. The General Certificate of Education (GCE), both Ordinary and Advanced levels, are the two most qualifying exams in the Anglophone part of Cameroon. There are two separate secondary schooling systems, depending on whether the French or British colonial models apply. In broad terms, the secondary phase comprises a lower (middle school) and an upper level (high school). Many parents are unable to afford secondary school fees.

Students who graduate from a five-year secondary school program have to sit for the GCE Ordinary Level, and those who graduate from a two-year high school program have to sit for the GCE Advanced Level. So far, the GCE advanced level and the Baccalaureate (the francophone equivalent) are the two main entrance qualifications into institutions of higher learning.

After secondary school, there is the possibility of undertaking "vocational studies," courses aimed at unemployed people under the responsibility of the Ministry of employment.

=== Grading scale ===
==== French grading scale ====
Scale	Grade description	US Grade	Notes
15.00-20.00	Très bien (very good)	A	
13.00-14.99	Bien (good)	A-	
12.00-12.99	Assez bien (quite good)	B+	
11.00-11.99	Passable (satisfactory)	B	
10.00-10.99	Moyen (sufficient)	C	
0.00-9.99	Insuffisant (insufficient)	F	Failure (May be considered passing if entire year is passed)

==== English grading scale ====
Scale	Grade description	Division	US Grade
A	First class		A
A-	Second class	Upper division	A− / B+
B	Second class	Lower division	B
C+	Pass		C

== Primary and secondary education ==
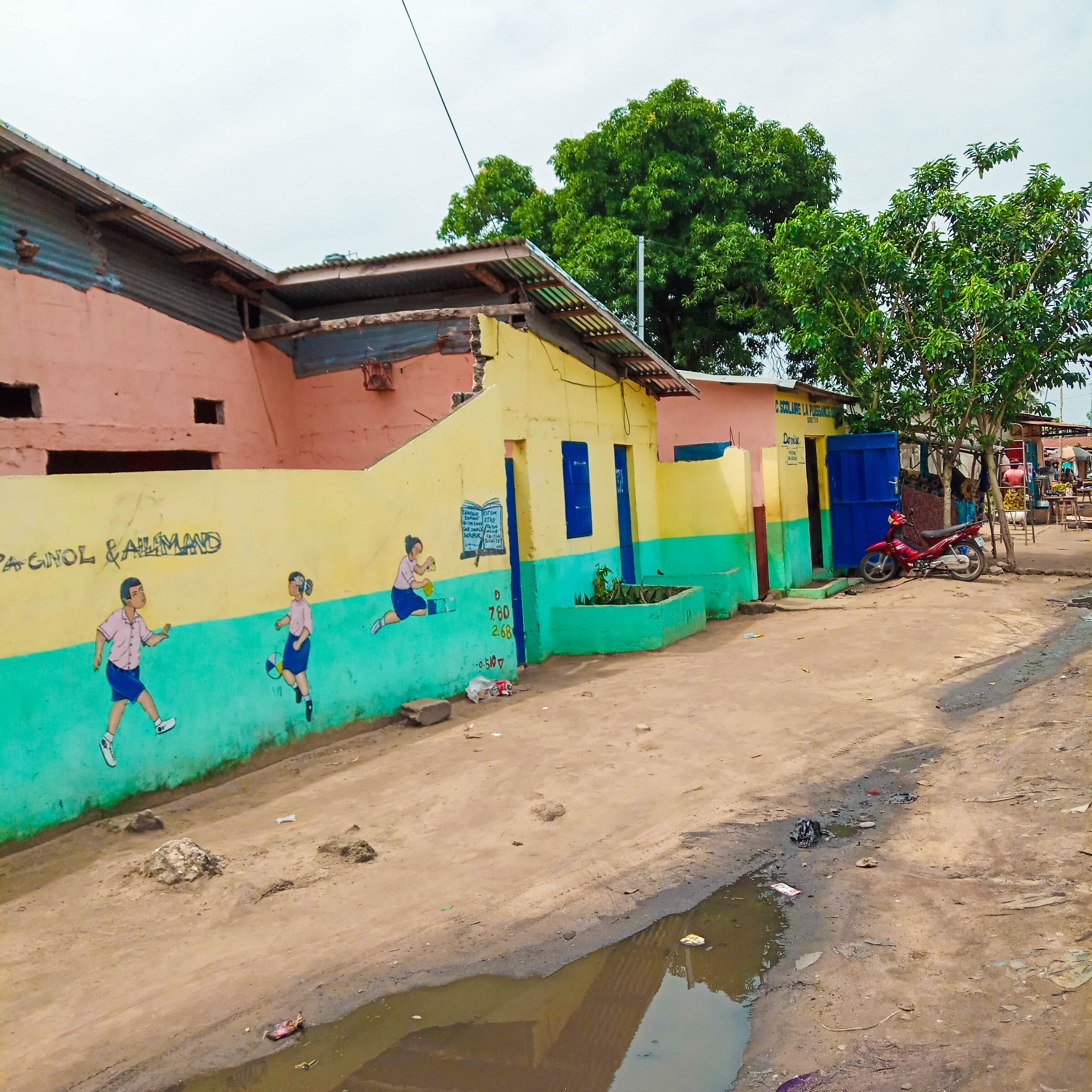
Primary school in Godomey.

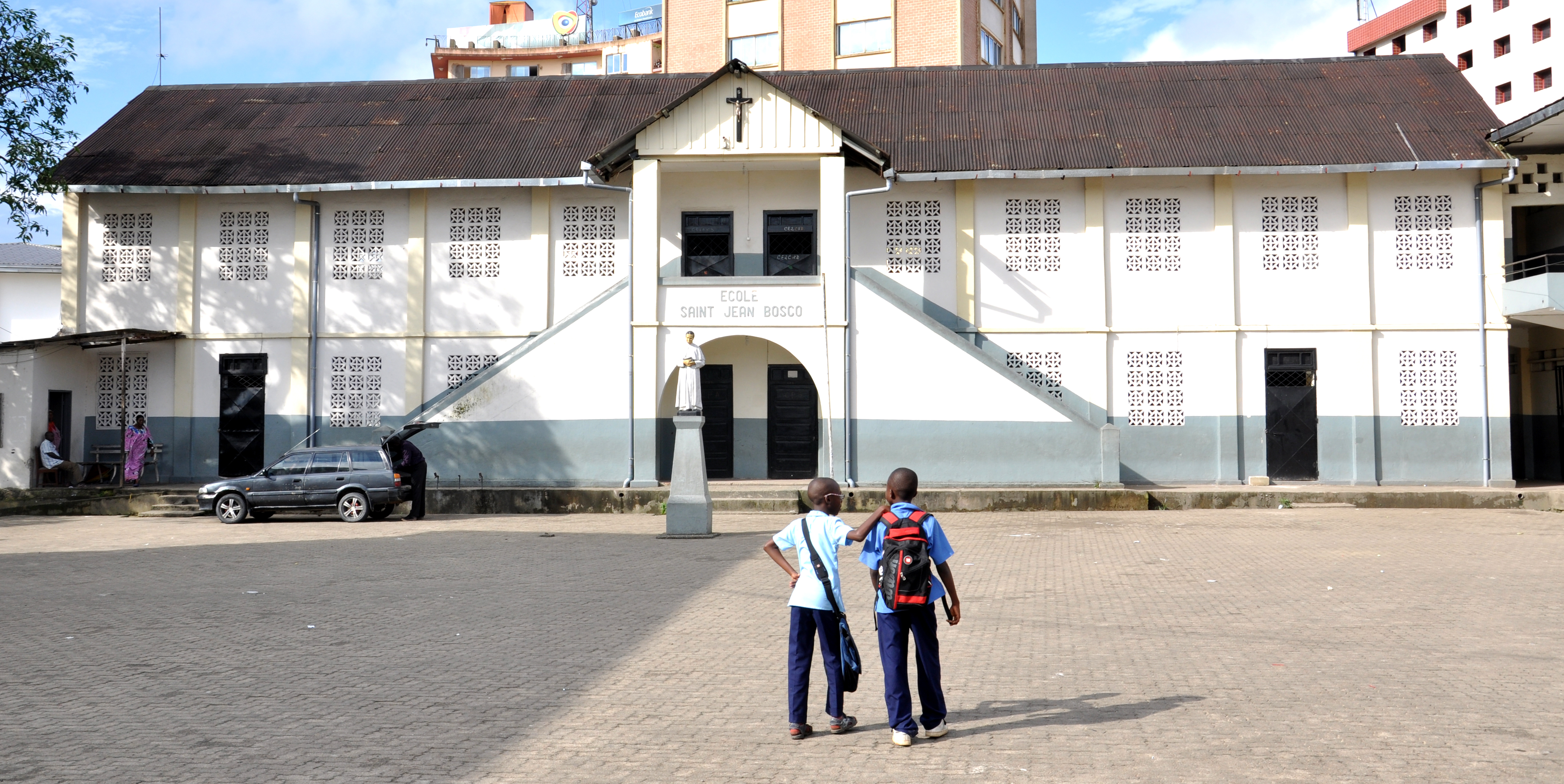
St Jean Bosco school in Douala.

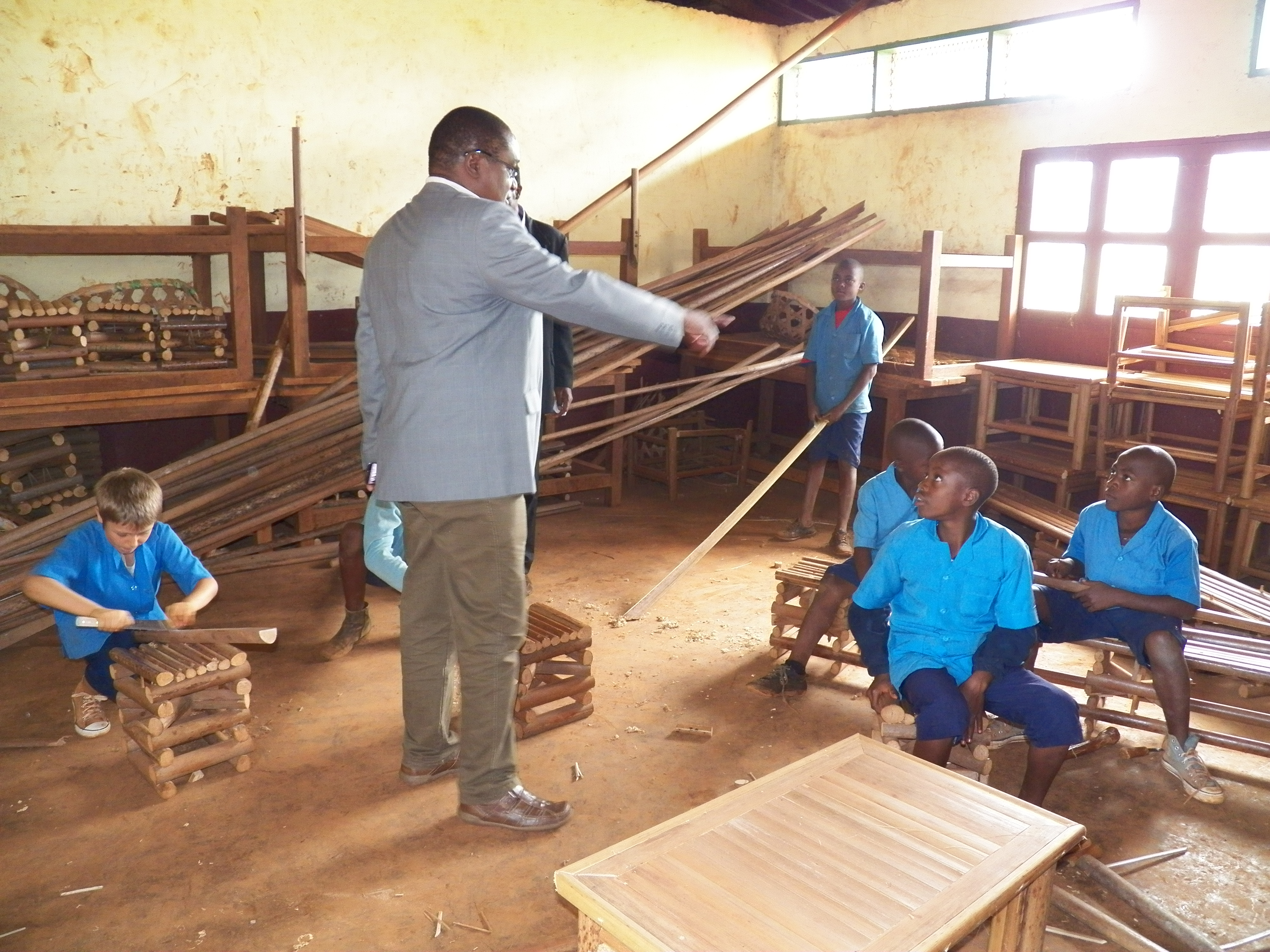
Vocational training in Mbô (Bandjoun).

Education is compulsory through the age of 12 years. Primary school education has been free since 2000; however, families must pay for uniforms and book fees. Tuition and fees at the secondary school level remain unaffordable for many families.

In 2002, the gross primary enrolment rate was 108%. Gross enrolment rates are based on the number of students formally registered in primary school and do not necessarily reflect actual school attendance. In 2001, 84.6% of children ages 10 to 14 years were attending school. As of 2001, 64% of children who started primary school were likely to reach grade 5.

Fewer girls enrol in primary school in Cameroon than boys. In 2001, the UN Committee on the Rights of the Child identified several problems with the education system in Cameroon, including rural/urban and regional disparities in school attendance; limited access to formal and vocational education for children with disabilities; children falling behind in their primary education; a high dropout rate; lack of primary school teachers; and violence and sexual abuse against children in schools. Early marriage, unplanned pregnancy, domestic chores and socio-cultural biases also contribute to low education rates. Domestic workers are generally not permitted by their employers to attend school.

The adult literacy rate is 67.9%. In the southern areas of the country, almost all children of primary-school age are enrolled in classes. However, in the north, which has always been the most isolated part of Cameroon, registration is low. Most students in Cameroon do not go beyond the primary grades. There has been an increasing trend of the smartest students leaving the country in recent years to study abroad and settling there: the so-called "brain drain".

Two separate systems of education were used in Cameroon after independence. East Cameroon's system was based on the French model, West Cameroon's on the British model. The two systems were merged by 1976. Christian mission schools have been an important part of the education system. The country has institutions for teacher training and technical education. At the top of the education structure is the University of Yaoundé. There is, however, a growing trend for the wealthiest and best-educated students to leave the country to study and live abroad, creating a brain drain.

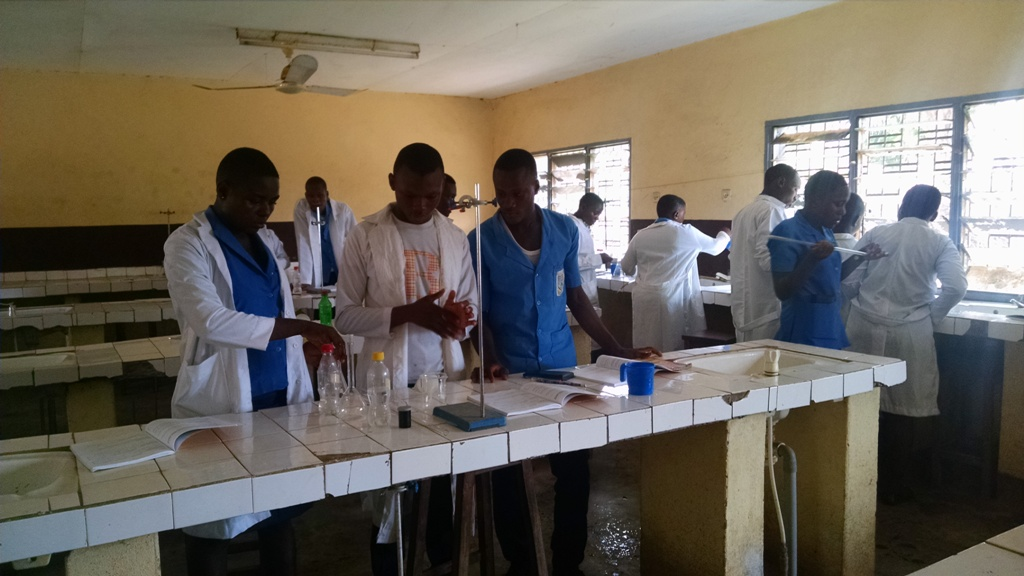
Students in a Science Laboratory at GBHS Tiko

passing the Government Common Entrance Examinations (and obtaining a First School Leaving Certificate) in Class 6 (now) or 7 (formerly). The last two years in secondary school, after GCE O Levels, are referred to as high school. A high school is part of the secondary school but in Cameroon, it is habitual to talk of secondary school for a school which ends at the O Levels and high school for one which offers the complete secondary education program of 7 years (or one which simply has lower and upper sixth classes).

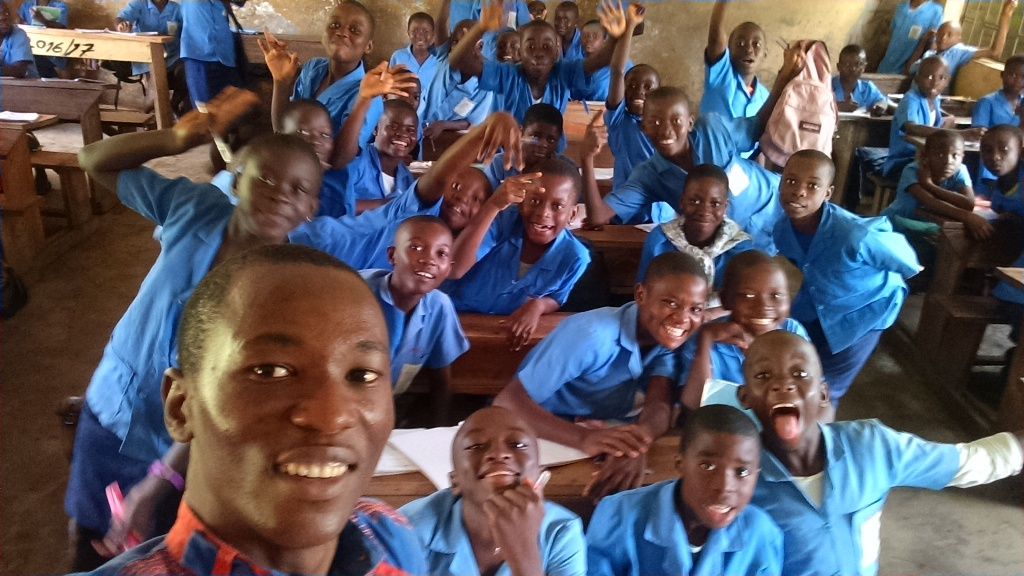
Computer science students in class

Researchers from the PanAf Project Cameroon found that female students now use social internet networks more for pedagogical reasons than the traditional thought of searching for boyfriends. The most used social internet networks included Facebook, Myspace, Hi-5, WhatsApp, Aidforum and Commentcamarche.

== Higher education ==
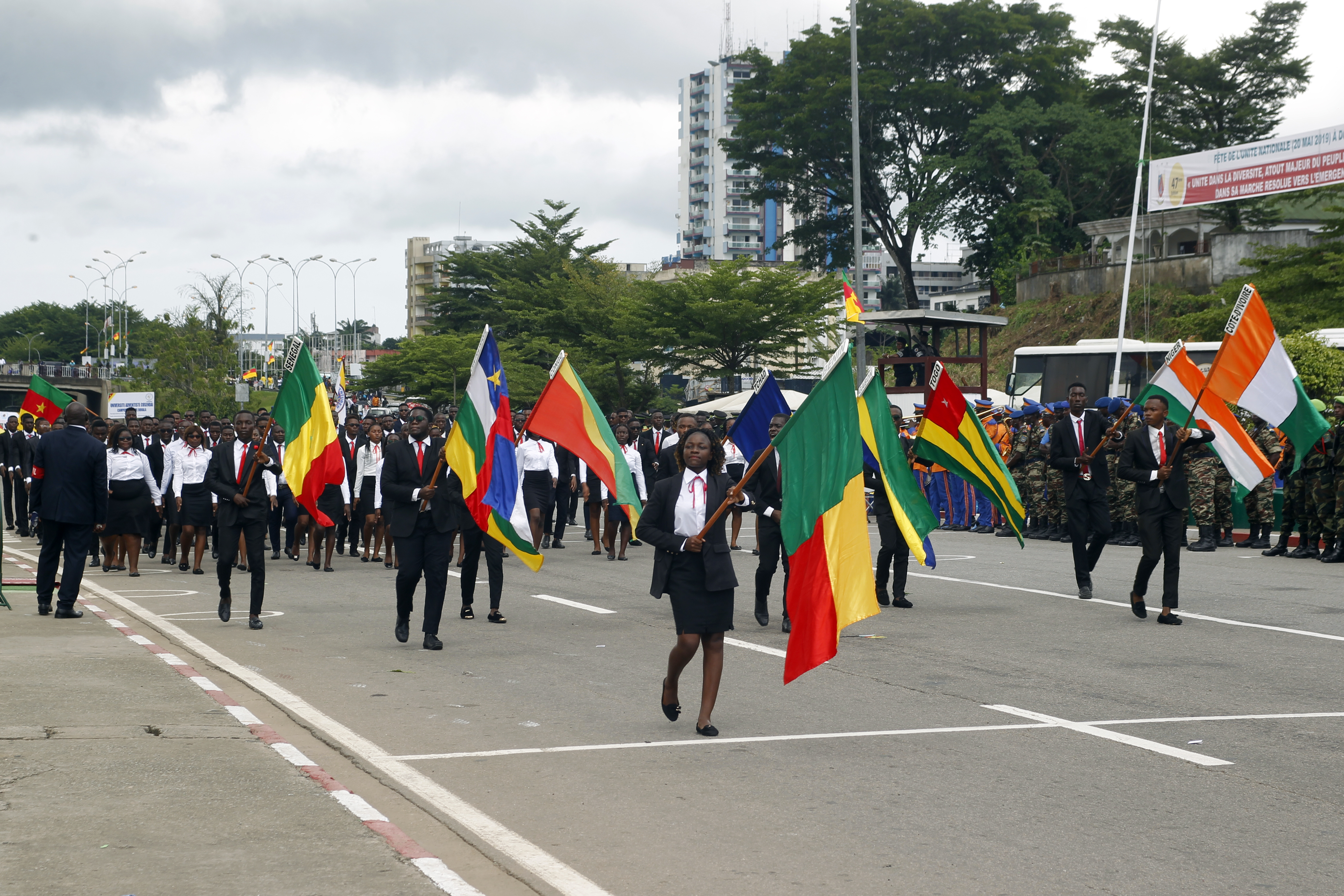
Students at the National Day parade 2019 in Douala

Although Cameroon boasts a sprawling cache of junior academic institutions of excellence, higher institutions are rather insufficient. There are eight state-run universities in Buea, Bamenda, Douala, Dschang, Maroua and Ngaoundere and Yaounde I & II. There is a handful of thriving private universities such as the Bamenda University of Science and Technology (BUST), International University Bamenda, Higher Institute for Professional Development and Training Bamenda (HIPDET), and the Fotso Victor University in the West Province.

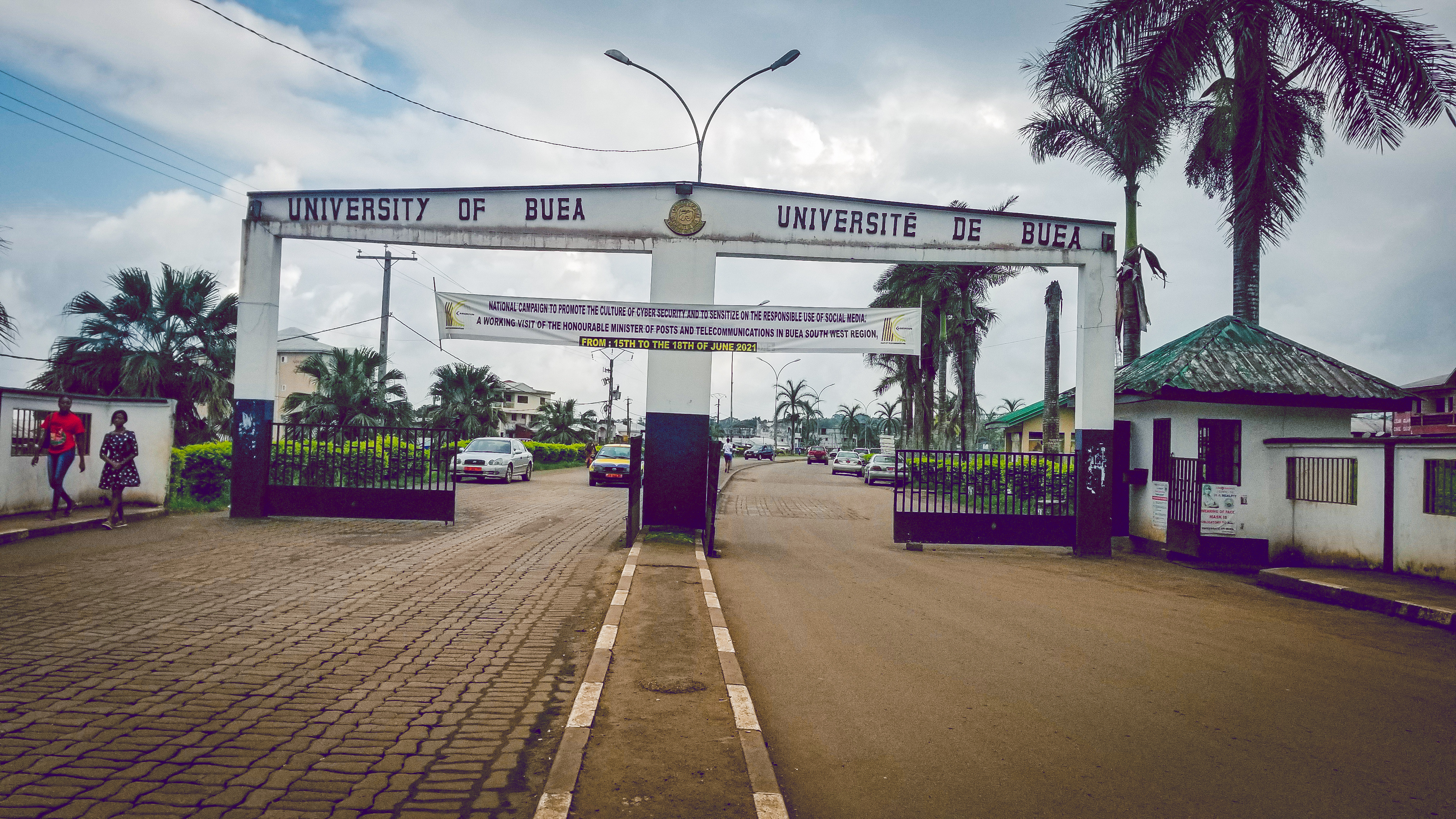
UB Junction

The University of Buea, the University of Yaounde I, and the University of Yaounde II are the only Anglo-Saxon-style universities. The University of Bamenda, which went operational in 2011, is bilingual. The rest of Cameroon's universities are run on the francophone model, although in principle, they are considered to be bilingual institutions. Cameroon's universities are strictly managed by the central government, with the pro-chancellors and rectors appointed by presidential decree. The minister of higher education is the chancellor of all Cameroon's state universities.

Compared with neighbouring countries, Cameroon generally enjoys a stable academic calendar. In all, Cameroon's higher education has been a success since independence, with thousands of its graduates mostly consumed by the national public service. Since the 1990s, with economic crises, a new trend has been for hundreds of university graduates to leave the country for better opportunities in Western countries.

Nonetheless, an emerging number of private higher technical institutions of learning like the American Institute of Cameroon AIC, Nacho University, Maaron Business School, Fonab Polytechnic, and many others are beginning to reshape the predominantly general style of education that for over three decades has been the turf of most anglophone students in Cameroon.

The eight public universities in Cameroon include:

- University of Bamenda

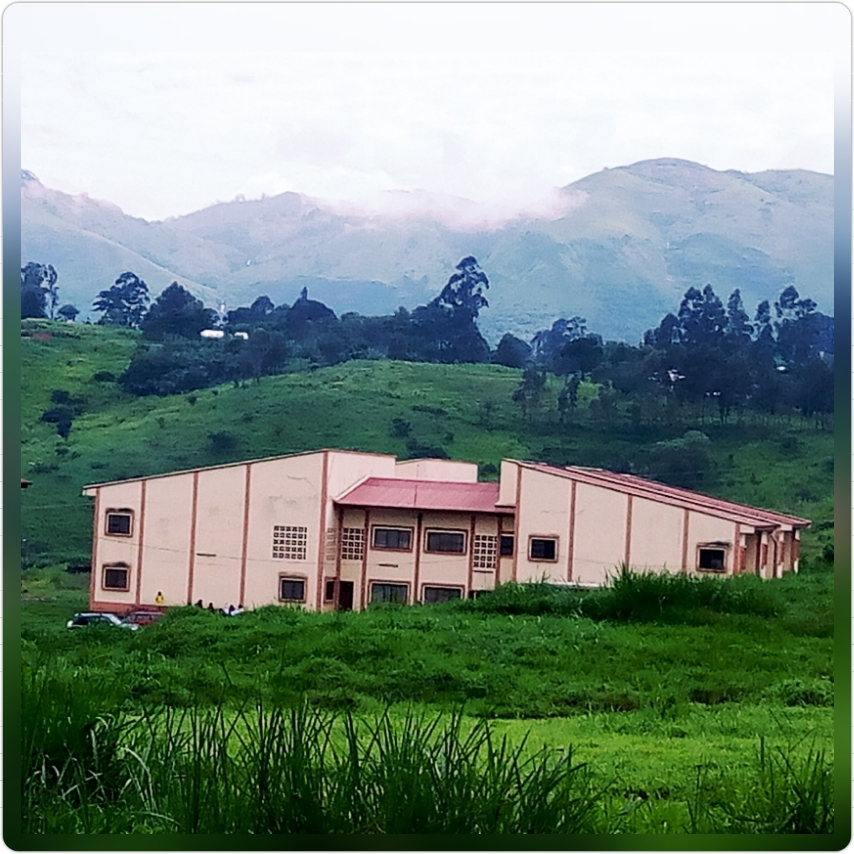
Bambili, university of Bamenda

- University of Buea
- University of Douala

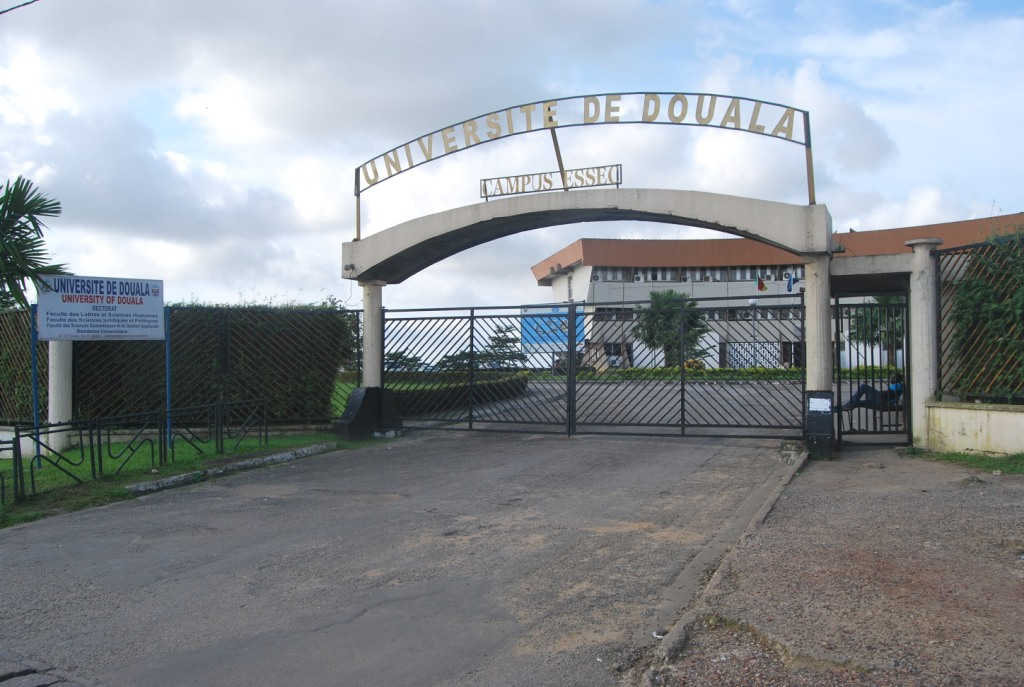
Campus ESSEC

- University of Dschang
- University of Maroua
- University of Ngaoundere
- University of Yaounde I
- University of Yaounde II

Other Universities in Cameroon include:

- Kesmonds International University (Ngaoundéré)

St. Thomas Aquinas Regional Major Seminary (Bambui)

- The Information and Communication Technology University (The ICT University) (Yaoundé, Cameroon)
- Bamenda University of Science & Technology (Bambui)
- Catholic University of Cameroon, Bamenda (Bambui)
- Fomic Polytechnic, Buea (Buea)
- International University, Bamenda:
- University Institute of the Diocese of Buea (two campuses)
- University of Maroua
- ST Monica The American University, Cameroon, Buea (Bulu Buea)
- American Institute of Cameroon, Ndop
- Catholic University of Central Africa (Yaounde)
- Yaounde International Business School-YIBS
- International Relations Institute of Cameroon
- Siantou and Ndi Samba Schools of Higher Learning (Yaounde)
- St Louis University Institute of Medical and Biomedical Sciences in Bamenda
- National Polytechnic Bambui
- St Jerome University Douala
- Institute Université de l'coté Douala
- Higher Institute For Professional Development And Training (HIPDET)

== Funding ==
Cameroon's public expenditure on education in 2011, according to UNESCO, amounted to 3.7% of GDP. St Monica America University

== Education issues ==
=== Teachers ===
Absenteeism of teachers is a reason generally considered to contribute to the poor level of education in the country. Teachers from both English and French sub-systems, for cultural and historical reasons, still operate as separate in the educational system, and this prevents "teachers from developing a joint pedagogical repertoire about professional matters and to engage in productive debates around new discourses and repertoires such as ICTs in support of teaching," even if as private individuals, they "appear to be open to the challenges of modern Cameroon and multilingual communication in large urban centres."

=== Textbook review ===
In 1995, the National Forum on Education strongly recommended "the insertion of local knowledge and practices in the school curriculum to make the education system more relevant to the learners." For so, the Institute of Rural Applied Pedagogy (IRAP) put into place adapted programs and an integrated training that combined general knowledge with work practices (agriculture, animal husbandry, poultry, brick laying, carpentry, etc.).

However, the system was not perfectly balanced: traditional subjects (i.e. Mathematics, Science, French language) were adequately developed, whereas the new subjects were not studied to adapt to the different situations, nor were considered other needs (in rural zones, children are forced to leave school because they are needed to provide enough means of support to their family).

The project was not a complete failure: some of the initiatives were, in fact, interesting and proved that the approach was somewhat correct, but had to be more precisely studied, possibly by integrating also teachers' and students' experiences, also outside schools.

=== Languages ===
The Cameroonian system is deeply divided into two sub-systems: even if formally the two have been merged since 40+ years, differences in approach among teachers are more than evident. This is a real issue, since it affects the possibilities of reforming the system in a more competitive and efficient way.

Another issue is the complete lack of a programme for including local languages in the educational system. Main reasons are the lack of Government support for the proposal, and the factual impracticability of some of the proposals: since there are more than 270 local languages in Cameroon, picking at random a language to be taught in all country "would generate political feelings of superiority that may endanger national unity." There are some programmes (both public and private) to teach those local languages at school and in other facilities, but there are anyway mixed feelings towards them: they are spoken the most in the ordinary lives of Cameroonians, but there is still a "social stigma" towards those who cannot speak anything other than an indigenous languages; on the contrary, being proficient in English or French is a source of pride, but still pupils are not stimulated in using these languages at home, because of the low literacy level of their families.

=== Education of students with special needs ===
In 2010, the UN Committee on the Rights of the Child stated that it "is deeply concerned at the persistence of de facto discrimination among children in the enjoyment of their rights. It is especially concerned that girls, indigenous children, children with disabilities, refugee children, children from poor rural areas, and children in street situations suffer particular disadvantages with regard to education, access to health and social services."

=== Impact of Boko Haram violence ===
Schools in the Far North Region, such as Fotokol, have been impacted by the Boko Haram insurgency, which has spilt into border areas from neighboring Nigeria. In January 2015, many schools in the Far North did not re-open immediately after the Christmas vacation following the December 2014 Cameroon clashes, and it was reported that "Thousands of teachers, students and pupils have fled schools located along the border due to bloody confrontations between the Cameroon military and suspected Boko Haram militants." The Cameroonian military has deployed forces to ensure safety for students attending schools.
