= Postage stamps and postal history of the British Cameroons =

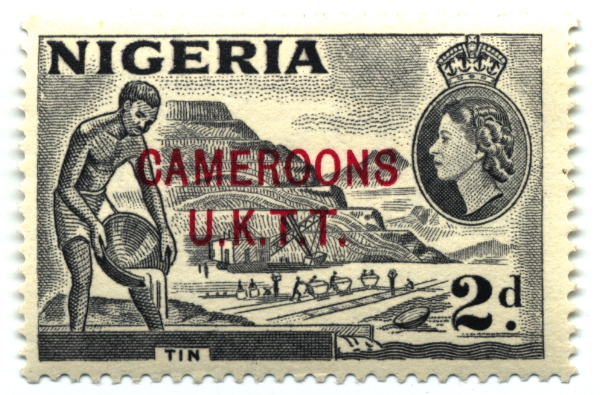
A 2d postage stamp of British Cameroons (1953)

The postal history of the British Cameroons falls into two essential parts: the occupation of German Kamerun by Anglo-French forces in 1915, when German Colonial stamps were issued with an overprint and surcharge; and the situation following a 1961 plebiscite, after which the former British Cameroons, was divided between Cameroon and Nigeria.

== Historical background ==
Cameroon was a German protectorate called Kamerun on the outbreak of the First World War. It was invaded by Anglo-French forces in September 1914 and finally overrun in February 1916. The bulk of the country became the French colony of Cameroun while Great Britain claimed two western areas, adjacent to the Nigerian border. These were collectively known as British Cameroons and, following the Second World War, separately as Northern Cameroons and Southern Cameroons. The Anglo-French claims were ratified by League of Nations mandates in 1922.

== British Occupation issues: 1915 ==
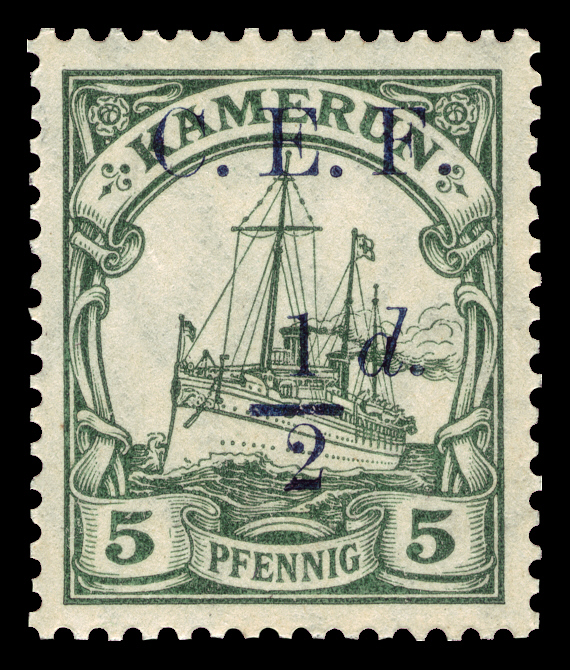
British Occupation stamp, 1915, overprinted C.E.F. (Cameroons Expeditionary Force) and surcharged a halfpenny

Stamps of German Kamerun were overprinted C.E.F. (Cameroons Expeditionary Force) and surcharged with values from one halfpenny to five shillings by the British occupation forces in July 1915.

== British Cameroons ==
From about 1920, British Cameroons used stamps of Nigeria without overprint. These can be recognised only cancellation marks which show one of 15 relevant post offices. After the Second World War ended, British Cameroons was formally divided into its northern and southern constituents but both continued to use the Nigerian stamps with local cancellations.

== Northern and Southern Cameroons ==
After French Cameroun became independent in January 1960, it was decided to hold plebiscites in Northern and Southern Cameroons in February 1961. Northern Cameroons opted to join Nigeria, effective from 31 May 1961, and so continued to use Nigerian stamps as before. Southern Cameroons opted to join Cameroon effective 1 October 1961.

In the interval, stamps of Nigeria values one halfpenny to one pound, overprinted CAMEROONS U.K.T.T. (United Kingdom Trust Territory) were issued. These stamps were valid in Northern and Southern Cameroons until separate existence ended.

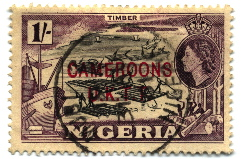
Shilling stamp used at Mubi, now in Nigeria

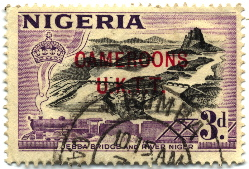
Threepence stamp used at Kumba, now in Cameroon

== See also ==
- Postage stamps and postal history of Cameroon

== References and sources ==
Sources

- Stanley Gibbons Ltd, various catalogues.
- Stanley Gibbons Ltd, British Commonwealth 1966, Stanley Gibbons Ltd, 1965.
- Stanley Gibbons Ltd, Europe and Colonies 1970, Stanley Gibbons Ltd, 1969.
- Stanley Gibbons Ltd, Great Britain Concise 1997, Stanley Gibbons Ltd, 1997.
- Rossiter, Stuart & John Flower. The Stamp Atlas. London: Macdonald, 1986. ISBN 0-356-10862-7
- XLCR Stamp Finder and Collector's Dictionary, Thomas Cliffe Ltd, c. 1960.
