= Climate of Cameroon =

The climate of Cameroon is very diverse. Cameroon is generally referred to as the Africa in miniature because it has the major climates and vegetation of the continent. The country is separated in two main climatic zones: the equatorial climate in the south and the tropical climate in the northern part.

== Types of climate ==
A Köppen climate classification map of Cameroon.

=== The equatorial climate ===
The equatorial zone in Cameroon stretches from 2 to 5° N, covering the southern and the mountainous western part of the country. The equatorial zone has 4 seasons 2 dry and 2 wet. The equatorial zone It is characterized by abundant rainfall (more than 1,000 mm of rainfall per year) and especially by the absence of a dry season: we speak here of "dry seasons" for the periods when it rains less (December–January, then July–August, with local variations). The atmosphere is humid all year round: The temperature ranges from 20 to 25 °C and the wettest regions receive more than 400 mm of rainfall per month.

This climate has many nuances, classified differently according to the studies, but which all depend on the relief and the proximity of the Atlantic coast. The coastal plain around Douala experiences a so-called "hyperhumid" climate with a total absence of a dry season. Douala is regularly flooded in the rainy season. At the foot of Mount Cameroon, rainfall is at record levels: more than 7,500 mm per year in Limbé. The equatorial climate of the western highlands is "mountain facies" (the relief creates strong variations in rainfall and lowers temperatures).

The coastal belt includes some of the wettest places on earth. The coast near Mount Cameroon experiences the most abundant rainfall in the country. The locality of Debundscha for example, has an average annual rainfall of 10,299 mm.

The southern Cameroon plateaux and the southern coastal plain experience the so-called Guinean-type climate that characterizes the Congo Basin forest.

=== The Tropical climate ===
From south to north, depending on the latitude with variations due to the relief, the tropical climate has three very different types:

- A humid tropical climate: at altitude, around the Adamaoua. rainfall here is abundant: around 1,500 mm per year. the temperature is moderate all year round (around 20 °C) and the dry season in Ngaoundéré goes from October to January
- A tropical Sudanese climate: This climate zone is located around the Bénoué basin. The temperatures in the zone are high and the rains remain abundant (1,300 mm annually in Garoua). However the dry season is getting longer (6 months. Rainfall is much more irregular violent and brief tornadoes, caused by dry winds such as the harmattan.
- A Sudano-Sahelian tropical climate in the north: This climatic zone is located in the northern desert regions are hot and dry.The temperatures are high but with little rainfall; the dry season lasts 8 months in the extreme North region and the rainy season last 4 months.

== Climate change ==
The average annual temperature of Cameroon has increased over the past decades going up by 0.86 °C over 46 years, from 24.28 °C in 1974 to 25.14 °C in 2020. On the other hand, the average annual precipitation has decreased by 2.9 millimetres (0.11 inches) per decade since 1960, with a particularly low average rainfall in 2015.

In the northern part the violent winds, floods, landslides, erosion, and increased incidences of drought and desert advancement have scorched large expanses of land, causing

Climate change is an imminent threat to Cameroon's development due the country's dependence on natural resources and Cameroonians' dependence on agriculture. With its heavy rainfall that alternates with a six- to seven-month dry season, the Northern Cameroon seems to be the most vulnerable to climate change.

In December 2009, the Cameroonian government created the National Observatory on Climate Change (NOCC), an organisation under the supervision of the Ministry of environment, in charge of monitoring and evaluating the socio- economic and environmental impact of climate change in Cameroon. The NOCC collect climate data and publishes regular reports on the effects of climate change in Cameroon.

== Extreme weather and hazards ==
Between 1980 and 2020, floods and droughts were the second and third most frequently recurring natural hazard in Cameroon on average, or 32.1 percent and 7.5 percent of total natural hazards.

=== Floods ===
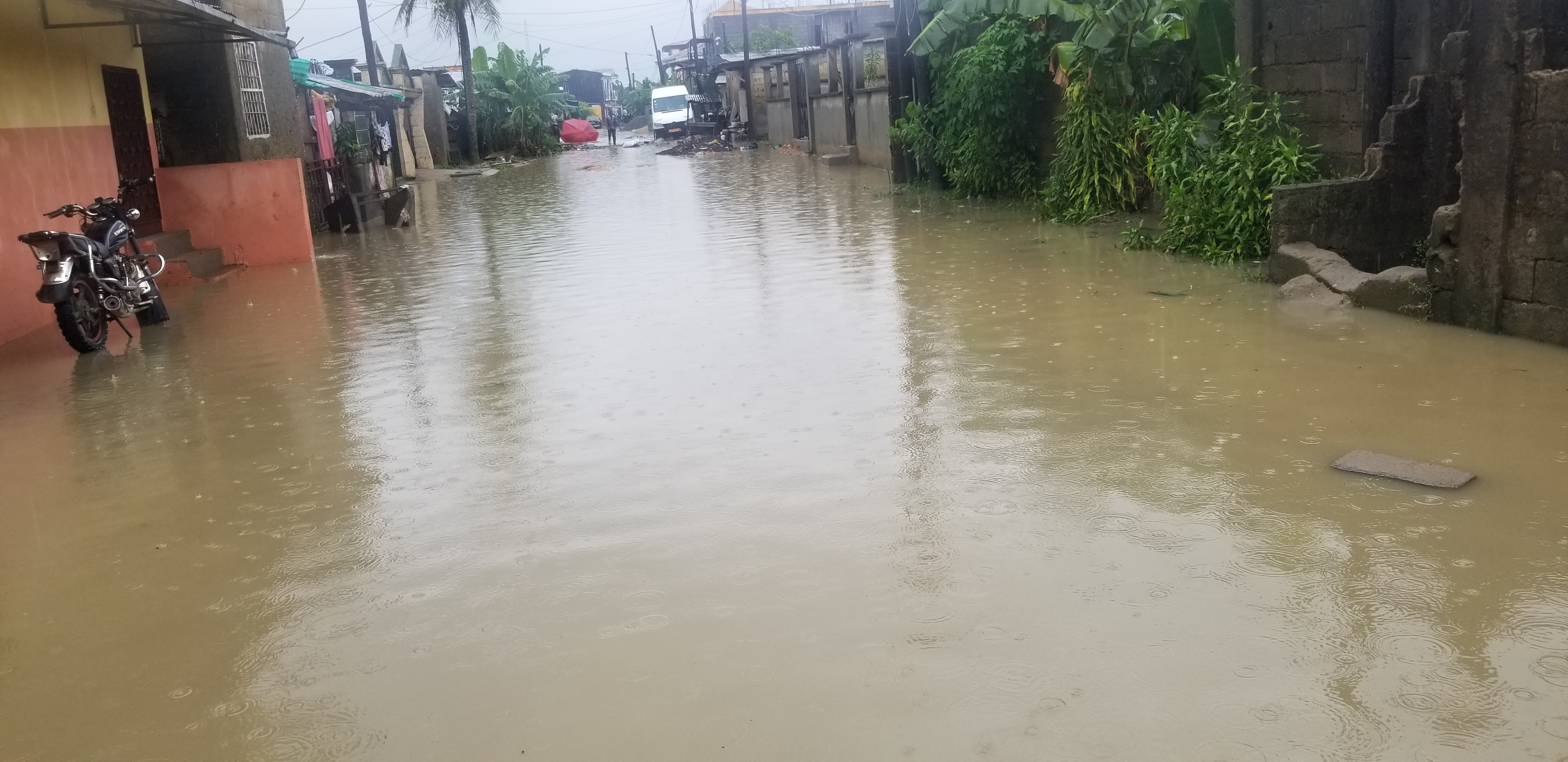
Flood in Douala.
