= Privatization of the electricity sector in Cameroon =

The privatization of the electricity sector in Cameroon refers to the process by which the generation, transmission, distribution, and sale of electricity in Cameroon has been transferred from the state to the private sector. This includes the sale of assets and the granting of concessions to the private sector. The landmark event of this process is the sale of 56% of the Société National d'Electricité (SONEL), the fully integrated public company responsible for the generation, transmission, distribution, and sale of electricity in Cameroon, to AES Corporation in 2001. The deal also granted concessions for each sub-sector to the newly formed AES-SONEL company. The new regulatory framework to prepare for this privatization was implemented between 1998 and 2000.

In 2011, a law set a new regulatory framework allowing for the introduction of more competition, in particular in the production sector. In addition, the law established the basis for the disintegration of the electricity sector by the renationalization of the transmission subsector.

== Forms of privatization ==
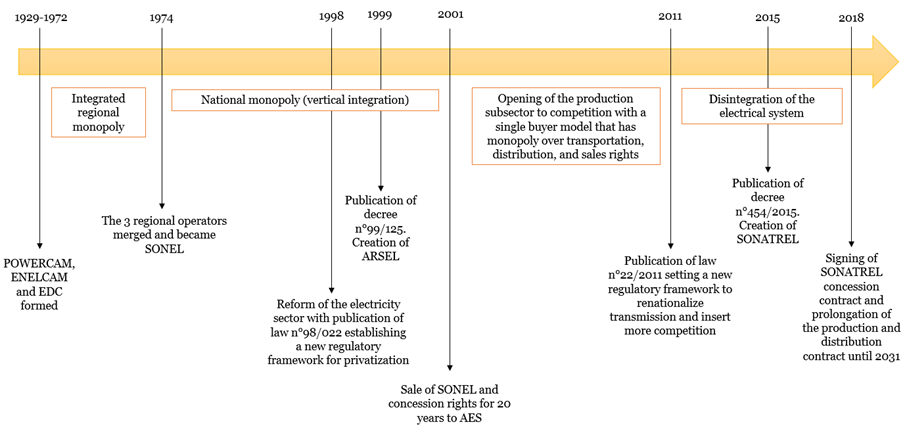
Timeline of the institutional evolution of the Cameroonian electricity sector from 1929 to 2018

Privatization in the strict sense refers to the transfer of public companies and assets to the private sector. In the broad sense, it refers to the delegation to the private sector of the provision of services previously provided by the public sector. In other words, in a broad sense, privatization means having private sector actors replace public actors in the provision of certain services and goods.

In the case of Cameroon, the privatization of the electricity sector refers to the process by which 56% of SONEL, the fully integrated public company responsible for the generation, transmission, distribution, and sale of electricity in Cameroon, was sold to the private sector, as well as the concessions granted to the private sector to operate these four subsectors of the electricity sector. By implication, it also refers to the period of private management of the electricity sector in Cameroon and the various regulatory reforms that accompanied the process of privatization.

In 2001, the state-owned Cameroonian electricity company SONEL was sold by the government to the US-based firm AES Corporation. AES Corporation was the only bidder in the public tender. ENEO was sold in compliance with the World Bank's third structural adjustment credit project. The initial privatization process in Cameroon is peculiar in that a vertically integrated electricity company was sold as a joint venture, giving a quasi-monopolistic position to the buyer. With the 2011 reform, more competition was introduced in the market by renationalizing the transmission subsector and introducing more legal opportunities for other private firms to produce electricity and compete in this market.

== Background ==
=== Oil Boom (1978–1986) ===
Starting in 1978, Cameroon knew an economic boom that lasted until 1986. During this period, real gross domestic product (GDP) grew 8.8% a year on average. By 1986, per capita real GDP had risen by 52%. This growth was mainly due to the boom in the oil sector, stimulated by high prices on the world market. The sector's production jumped from less than 5 million barrels in 1978 to over 66 million barrels in 1986.

Government revenues benefited greatly from this boom. The state's oil revenues rose from less than 20 billion FCFA in 1980 to 330 billion FCFA in 1985, representing 9% and 41% of total revenues, respectively. In total, government revenue went from an average of 17% of GDP during 1965–1977 to an average of 21% of GDP during the period from 1978 to 1986.

Due partly to the favorable fiscal situation, the state launched ambitious economic policies. It started substantial capital investments, notably directed at improving public infrastructures. New public agencies were created and expanded. The state was involved in most sectors of the economy.

=== Economic recession (1987–1993) ===
From 1987 to 1993, Cameroon went through a severe economic crisis. During this period, real GDP per capita dropped by 40%. External factors deemed important by scholars were the devaluation of the FCFA and the deterioration of the terms of trade on the global market. Cameroon's economy was still based mainly on the export of primary commodities, such as oil, cocoa, and coffee, the prices of which were plummeting. Among the internal factors, the decline in oil production and the inability of state-owned enterprises and the government to react and adjust their spending are understood as important additional factors by scholars.

State revenues had already peaked in 1984, and the budgetary crisis knew its worst in 1987 when the state deficit reached 13% of GDP. During this period, the average state deficit amounted to 7% of GDP. The deficit was mainly financed by the accumulation of domestic and international arrears and external debt.

In the electricity sector, SONEL, a state-owned fully integrated company founded in 1974 and granted monopoly status in 1983 over the production, transmission, distribution, and sale of electricity in Cameroon, experienced financial difficulties. This was due in part to the devaluation of the FCFA, which hampered its ability to repay its international debt remaining in foreign currency. As a result, investments stalled, preventing the maintenance and repair of existing facilities and slowing down rural electrification.

=== Reforms and privatization (1989–2003) ===
The crisis led to numerous economic reforms, most of which took place between 1989 and 2004. The government received substantial loans and assistance from the World Bank (WB) and the International Monetary Fund (IMF) to help manage the consequences of the crisis. They were conditioned to the realization of structural adjustment programs (SAPs). Their overarching goals, as stated officially by the IMF were to "(a) strengthen macroeconomic stability and restore external and internal viability; (b) bring the economy onto a sustainable development path; and (c) improve the social conditions of the population and substantially reduce poverty." Specifically, the main operational requirements of the WB and IMF were to deregulate the market, promote the private sector and disengage the state from the economy, as well as to improve economic and social infrastructure and transparency, and reduce corruption.

Three SAPs took place. SAP I (1989-1994) and SAP II (1996-1999) were conditions for loans of US$150 million, and SAP III (1998-2004) was a condition for a loan of US$180 million. Privatization in Cameroon began under the 1990 Ordinance, which set the framework for the private management of previously state-owned firms and encouraged competition from private firms. Additionally, it set transparency conditions for the state and privatized firms, to reassure interested buyers and the public that there would be no corruption. Within the framework of these two first SAPs, 48 privatizations of public enterprises were carried out between 1990 and 1998. In all sectors, some state-owned firms were sold to national and international actors for a total of US$72 million.

Against this backdrop, a new regulatory framework for the electricity sector was implemented between 1998 and 2000 to allow for private involvement and competition. It was enacted by the 1998 electricity law and three subsequent decrees. Two agencies were created: the Electricity Regulatory Agency (ARSEL) and the Rural Electrification Agency (AER). ARSEL has the function of supervising the development of competition principles and private involvement by regulating the electricity sector, while AER is in charge of rural electrification. The 1998 electricity law also divides the sector into four sub-sectors with associated concessions, namely production, transmission, distribution, and retail sale.

In 2001, SONEL was privatized. It was bought at 56% by the American company AES Corporation for between US$69 and 71 million. The price was divided into approximately US$30 million to the Cameroonian government, and US$40 million to be invested in the company. AES was the only bidder in a public tender in November 2000. The Cameroonian state retained a 44% stake in the company. The deal provided a concession for each subsector, as well as a three-year period during which no penalty would be imposed on SONEL for service interruption. This concession was to last twenty years for transmission and distribution and five years for the operation of the system. The concession for sales rights, exclusive, was to last five years, except for consumers of less than 1 MW for which it could last indefinitely. Despite the stated aim of introducing competition in the electricity sector, SONEL remained the only firm with concession rights in all four subsectors until 2011. By 2005, no new concession rights had been granted to any other company.

The final concession contract signed in July 2001 was never made public. ARSEL initially refused to collaborate in its publication. Even after announcing it would release it in February 2003, it never did so. In addition, a 2000 presidential decree temporarily removed the requirement for accounting rules for SONEL, which had been set in the 1998 electricity law to ensure transparency.

=== Reforms, nationalization of transmission, and sale of SONEL (2011–2018) ===
In December 2011, the executive introduced a new law to regulate the electricity sector, which was passed by the National Assembly. The law was designed with the stated aims of facilitating small-scale localized production for industrial purposes, promoting competition, particularly in the production sub-sector, as well as diversifying production sources, including the use of renewable energy sources. Another central aspect of the law was to renationalize the transmission of electricity. Since 2001, AES-SONEL had been the only transmission system operator, which gave it dominance in the electricity market as it was the only firm allowed to fully integrate production, transmission, distribution, and sales, with a de facto legal monopoly on transmission and distribution. The 2011 law changed this state of affairs and provided for electricity transmission to be placed under public management. The transfer was planned to happen after the negotiated termination of the current concession, and the transfer of assets and personnel to the new public transmission company. However, AES-SONEL still remains the exclusive distributor authorized to sell electricity to the public.

In November 2013, AES agreed to sell its 56% stake in SONEL and its subsidiaries Kribi Power Development Company (KPDC) and Dibamba Power Development Company (DPDC) to the British private investment fund ACTIS for US$220 million. This occurred in the context of a general withdrawal of AES from 8 countries in an attempt to "drive shareholder value by exiting markets where [they did] not have a compelling competitive advantage", according to AES 2013 annual report. The sale was ratified by the government in May 2014. In September 2014, as the result of a contest, ACTIS announced the new name of the electricity operator: Energy of Cameroon (ENEO).

In September 2015, ACTIS sold its shares in KPDC and DPDC to a consortium composed of the state-owned Norwegian Investment Fund for Developing Countries, Norfund, and the state-owned British development finance institution, Commonwealth Development Corporation (CDC Group). This sale occurred as part of the purchase by the two funds of all the assets owned by ACTIS in Globeleq Africa, which owned and managed DPDC and KPDC through its subsidiary Globeleq Cameroon Management Services (GCMS). ACTIS retained ownership of 56% of ENEO, for US$227 million.

To implement the reforms provided in the 2011 law, the Société national de transport d'électricité (SONATREL) was created by presidential decree in October 2015. According to the decree's text, its goals are "the transport of electrical energy and the management of the transport network on behalf of the state". The society was placed under the technical supervision of the Ministry of Water Resources and Energy (MINEE), and the financial supervision of the Ministry of Finance (MINFI). SONATREL officially started its new concession activities in April 2018, after signing a protocol of agreement with ENEO regarding the recruitment of ENEO staff needed to operate the transmission system. The government renewed ENEO's exclusive distribution concession in August 2018.

== Energy production in Cameroon and the role of electricity ==
Oil and wood were the two most important sources of energy in Cameroon in 2001. At the time, some researchers feared that these materials would eventually become scarce due to the speed of their exploitation. Hydropower generation is the main source of electric energy in Cameroon. It represented 90% of the total productive capacity in 2004. However, its importance has been gradually reduced as more thermal power plant have been constructed. Hydroelectric energy production represented 77% and 71% of the total productive capacity of electricity in 2008 and 2010 respectively.

The Cameroonian electricity sector was faced with structural difficulties during the 1988-1996 period. Against this backdrop, international donors and the government looked to attract foreign investments. Hydro-Quebec sparked talks of construction, planning to make a 175 MW gas power plant. However, discussions on privatization caused uncertainty and many projects slowed down.

The most privatized parts of Cameroon are the Eastern parts of the country, since the Northwest, Southwest, and the far Northern areas of Cameroon are riddled with instability.

In 2020, about 65% of Cameroonians had access to electricity. On the other hand, access to electricity varies greatly between rural and urban areas. For instance, in 2012, while 53% of the total population was covered by the existing grid, only 18% of the rural population had access to electricity.

The mini-grid sector within Cameroon is in its developing stages. Lack of funds and investment has made mini-grid companies unreliable. The mini-grid companies include Renewable Energy Innovators Cameroon (REIC), Sagemcom, Solkamtech, WeeY Energie et Eau, Idratel Energy Cameroon, and SunErgy Power. The companies lack investment, operators, and technicians to support building the electrical grids.

The insecurity within the Northwest, Southwest, and the far Northern areas of Cameroon, has led private stakeholders to doubt the possibility of viable commercial grid activity. Other challenges include limited access to capital and investment, high tariffs, and the lack of specified policies and regulations for off-grid construction.

Major challenges Cameroon faces include financial, institutional, and structural issues. The financial issues halting the expansion of electricity come from off-grid stakeholders finding it difficult to access the capital needed to implement these projects. Institutionally, security risks in the Northwest, southwest, and Far North regions, make it difficult to provide electricity access to individuals in those areas. Structurally, the disparity between an individual's access to electricity in rural versus urban areas is large.

The PDER, the rural electrification masterplan was approved in 2016. PDER aims to provide 250,000 new rural households with electricity in 5-year terms between 2016 and 2035. To implement this, ENEO will have to increase its customer base.

Access to electricity in Cameroon is heavily influenced by income inequalities, meaning that an individual's access to electricity varies based on his or her socioeconomic standing. In most cases, poorer individuals have been most hurt by the privatization of electricity, due to poor service quality and increased regulatory prices for smaller consumers. Additionally, wealthier citizens are able to purchase small diesel production units to mitigate blackouts.

== Actors in Cameroon's electricity sector ==
=== Electricity companies ===
Historically, the country went from regional monopolies exercised by three companies: POWERCAM, ENELCAM, and Electricite Du Cameroun (EDC) to a national monopoly with vertical integration exercised by SONEL, following a merger of the three firms.

POWERCAM was created in West Cameron in 1962. In 1963, a mixed economy company called Electricite Du Cameroun (EDC) was created with shares owned by the State of East Cameroon. The company was founded to manage electricity distribution and transmission facilities. However, the EDC initially did not generate power for the ENELCAM held power plants. EDC eventually took over generation following economic difficulties.

From 1973 to 1974, Cameroon discussed the merger of ENELCAM and the EDC, which would form a new company called the Cameroon National Electricity Corporation (SONEL). The mission of SONEL was to produce, transmit, distribute, and sell electrical energy in Cameroon. Later in 1975, POWERCAM was absorbed by SONEL.

In 2001, privatization occurred which led to the takeover of SONEL by AES Corporation. AES held 56% of the capital, and 44% was owned by the State of Cameroon.

On May 23, 2014, the Cameroonian government signed an agreement that gave ACTIS a 56% stake in AES-SONEL, including its subsidiaries KPDC and DPDC. A few months later, the new company name was revealed, Energy of Cameroon S.A. (ENEO). ENEO is 44% state-owned, and its respoinsabilities are the production, transmission, distribution, and sale of electricity to the consumers.

=== Other companies ===
On February 26, 2019, GE Renewable Energy was awarded an 87 million hydropower contract in Cameroon. The company was given the contract by Nachtigal Hydro Power Company, in which they facilitated the distribution of MW Francis turbines. The plant is planned to be fully operating in 2023, which will facilitate sustainable access to renewable electricity.

Various mini-grid companies operate in Cameroon: Renewable Energy Innovators Cameroon (REIC), Sagemcom, Solkamtech, WeeY Energie et Eau, Idratel Energy Cameroon, and SunErgy Power. Their role is to provide electricity access to rural parts of Cameroon. However, these mini-grid companies are met with a lack of investment, leading to a lack of technical skills to run the operations. Additionally, the companies are left with no regulatory framework to protect the operators.

=== Chinese involvement ===
Chinese investment in the hydro sector of electricity is on the rise, through the China International Water and Electric Corporation (CWE). Since, after the initial privatization, AES avoided investing in hydroelectric projects, preferring gas and fuel-fired thermal plants, hydroelectric projects were mainly financed by other actors. This led to substantial Chinese participation and investment in the hydroelectric sector. The construction of 3 hydropower plants began in 2004, on the Ntem, Nja, and Kadey rivers. A majority of consumers receive hydroelectricity in Cameroon.

== Outcomes and responses ==
=== Outcomes ===
==== Service quality and access to electricity ====
Four years after SONEL's privatization in 2001, an evaluation of the Cameroonian electricity sector showed that service quality had deteriorated. Load shedding and power cuts became more frequent than before privatization, and a report of the French Development Agency even estimated that electricity shortages over the period had reduced economic growth by 1%. This can be explained partly by the fact that, during this period, Cameroon suffered two consecutive droughts with record low rainfalls. Due to its reliance on hydropower, the production of electricity suffered a decrease that is not related to the privatization. However, AES-SONEL made the choice not to operate their diesel thermal power plants during the outages, as the operating costs of these units exceeded the selling prices and the company was still within the three-year penalty-free period.

The electrification rate of Cameroon since privatization can be considered a relative success compared to other states in sub-Saharan Africa. In the first five years, AES-SONEL failed to fulfill its obligation to add at least 50,000 new connections per year. It only added 20,000 connections per year on average. However, between 2000 and 2012, Cameroon's rural electrification has risen from around 11% to 18%. The concession for the operation and management of the national electricity system has been used to extend connections to over 190,000 rural households during this period. Overall, 570,0000 new connections were established between 2001 and 2012, and around 53% of the total population was covered by the existing grid in 2012. In 2015, the total electrification rate was about 55% compared to an average of about 25% in the rest of sub-Saharan Africa. In addition, in 2015, between 60,000 and 80,000 new connections were built each year in Cameroon, making it one of the fastest electrification processes in Africa. A 2015 report of the World Bank pointed out that most grid extension projects are financed by the government and international donors and are then transferred to ENEO.

During the 2010s, Cameroonian media continued to regularly mention that ENEO's service quality was poor, marked by regular load shedding and power cuts. A 2013 study conducted by the International Labor Organization (ILO) underlined that power outages and load shedding created significant costs and constraints on Cameroonian companies. Another assessment in 2019 concluded that Cameroonian electricity consumers have faced more load shedding and power cuts since privatization. The proximate cause is the high dependency on hydropower (about 71% of total production in 2010), and consequently the vulnerability to climatic hazards. However, the ultimate cause pointed out is that investments have not kept pace with demand growth.

==== Tariffs ====
Electricity tariffs increased for all categories of consumers during the period between 2001 and 2005. Only ALUCAM, a Cameroonian aluminum company in the higher voltage category, avoided the new increased tariffs because of a pre-existing long-term contract fixing them at 5 FCFA/kWh. The two main sources of increase were the lowering of the monthly social consumption level for low voltage users, a level below which consumers benefit from a special reduced price, from 110 kWh to 50 kWh, and the increase in the fixed fee for medium voltage consumers that climbed from a yearly 9.125 FCFA/kW to a monthly 2.5 or 4 FCFA/kW, depending on the number of hours of use. However, tariffs also became more rational as their level fluctuated depending on the production conditions. For instance, during the rainy season, electricity prices are falling due to lower production costs.

A 2015 report of the World Bank noted that ENEO/AES-SONEL's high prices have constituted a major challenge since privatization.

==== Technical and financial results of AES-SONEL/ENEO ====
Between 2001 and 2005, the sales and revenues of AES-SONEL progressed. Revenues of US$203 and US$284 million were reported in 2003 and 2004 respectively. The firm became profitable in 2002. In 2003 and 2004, gross profits amounted to US$33 and US$48 million respectively. Gross margins of 16.3% and 16.9% were reported in 2003 and 2004 respectively. AES-SONEL even helped the parent company AES to resolve a liquidity crisis caused by maturing debts coupled with stock market losses following the Eron scandal.

From 2010 to at least 2014, the company's costs exceeded its revenues due to a tariff freeze decided by the MINEE on the recommendation of ARSEL. ENEO managed to remain profitable thanks to government subsidies as compensation.

An assessment in 2012 found a positive effect of privatization on productivity. It concluded that productivity had improved faster after privatization than before. The effect was small but significant.

==== Investments and new projects ====
The privatization process only partially succeeded in bringing in private sector investment. The privatization process only attracted one bidder. Due to its stock market losses and maturing debts, AES investments stopped or delayed all of its investments in 2001 and 2002. In 2005, it had invested US$65 million and planned to invest US$109 million in a fuel oil power plant in Limbé, while the concession contract stipulated that it should invest US$200 million in the first five years. The resulting additional generation capacity was 130 MW, respectively 50 MW resulting from the US$65 million investment, and 80 MW from the Limbé power plant. The capital to finance the Limbé power plant, however, was raised by the Dutch Development Bank (FMO) and the Emerging Africa Infrastructure Fund, which was largely funded by development agencies. As such, the risk was assumed with public money from international donors and not by the private sector.

In this context, the government took the lead in the development of new hydropower projects. It has sought investments from international donors and engaged in discussions with China, the World Bank, and French and German Development agencies. The Lom-Pangar dam, which was ultimately funded by loans of the World Bank, the French Development Agency, the African Development Bank, and the European Investment Bank, is a result of this process.

Two major projects are currently underway: the Rural Electricity Access Project and the Upstream Nachtigal Hydroelectric Project. The Rural Electricity Access Project is meant to increase access to electricity for rural Cameroonians. The Upstream Nachtigal Hydroelectric Project is projected to increase hydroelectric power, and general production of electricity to prevent power cuts and load shedding. These projects are being financed by the International Bank for Reconstruction and Development (IBRD) and International Development Association (IDA), both organizations that are related to the WB. The Rural Electricity Access Project is being incorporated in over 400 localities and should benefit more than 1 million people. The Upstream Nachtigal Hydroelectric Project will consist of the construction of a dam. In addition, the Nachtigal power plant will be connected to the Southern Interconnected Grid. The Southern Interconnected Grid provides for around 94% of Cameroon's electrical consumption.

==== Competition ====
During the 2001-2005 period, competition was not introduced in the Cameroonian electricity sector as AES-SONEL remained the only firm with concession rights for production, transmission, distribution, and sale of electric energy.

The 2011 reforms and subsequent vertical disintingration created a more competitive framework.

==== Environmental sustainability ====
During the period during which AES owned 56% of SONEL (2001-2014), it mostly prioritized investments and construction of thermal power plants relying on fuel or natural gas. The reason invoked is that they are quicker to build and operate. They thus fit better within the short-term time horizon of a private firm that has a 20 years concession contract to be renegotiated every 5 years and tries to generate profit. Against this backdrop, the government was the main actor to push for electricity projects relying on hydropower.

=== Responses ===
==== Popular discontent (2001–2011) ====
A 2011 survey of 1154 households found that privatization has had an overall negative impact on the welfare of electricity-consuming households, measured subjectively, in particular in semi-urban areas. Dissatisfaction was primarily related to pricing and the frequency of power outages. This measured discontent was associated with demonstrations against AES following the privatization and many complaints about the quality of the service reported in the media. In addition, many conflicts arose between AES-SONEL and consumer organizations over the issues of power outage and pricing. In Mai 2010, the network of electricity consumer associations (RACE), with other consumer organizations, threatened to launch a massive bill payment boycott campaign following a pricing adjustment in April 2010 described as "unilateral" by the government and not approved by ARSEL. RACE finally decided not to launch the campaign after meeting with AES-SONEL. However, the government continued to struggle with the operator until an agreement was reached and the price increase removed in September 2010.

==== Persistent popular discontent (2011–2022) ====
Even after the adoption and implementation of the 2011 law with the creation of SONATREL, Cameroonian consumers continued to face frequent load shedding and power cuts during the 2011-2022 period. The RACE and other consumer organizations continued to protest against this state of affairs and to advocate for an improvement of the stability and extent of the services. In February 2021, a protest march was organized in Yaoundé to protest against power outages.
