= List of ecoregions in Cameroon =

The following is a list of ecoregions in Cameroon, according to the Worldwide Fund for Nature (WWF).

== Terrestrial ecoregions ==
by major habitat type

=== Tropical and subtropical moist broadleaf forests ===
- Atlantic Equatorial coastal forests
- Cameroonian Highlands forests
- Cross–Sanaga–Bioko coastal forests
- Mount Cameroon and Bioko montane forests
- Northwestern Congolian lowland forests

=== Tropical and subtropical grasslands, savannas, and shrublands ===
- East Sudanian savanna
- Guinean forest–savanna mosaic
- Mandara Plateau mosaic
- Northern Congolian forest–savanna mosaic
- Sahelian Acacia savanna

=== Flooded grasslands and savannas ===
- Lake Chad flooded savanna

=== Mangroves ===
- Central African mangroves

== Freshwater ecoregions ==
by bioregion

=== Nilo-Sudan ===
- Lake Chad Catchment

=== West Coastal Equatorial ===
- Central West Coastal Equatorial
- Northern West Coastal Equatorial
- Western Equatorial Crater Lakes

=== Congo ===
- Sangha

== Marine ecoregions ==
- Gulf of Guinea Central
