= Postage stamps and postal history of Cameroon =

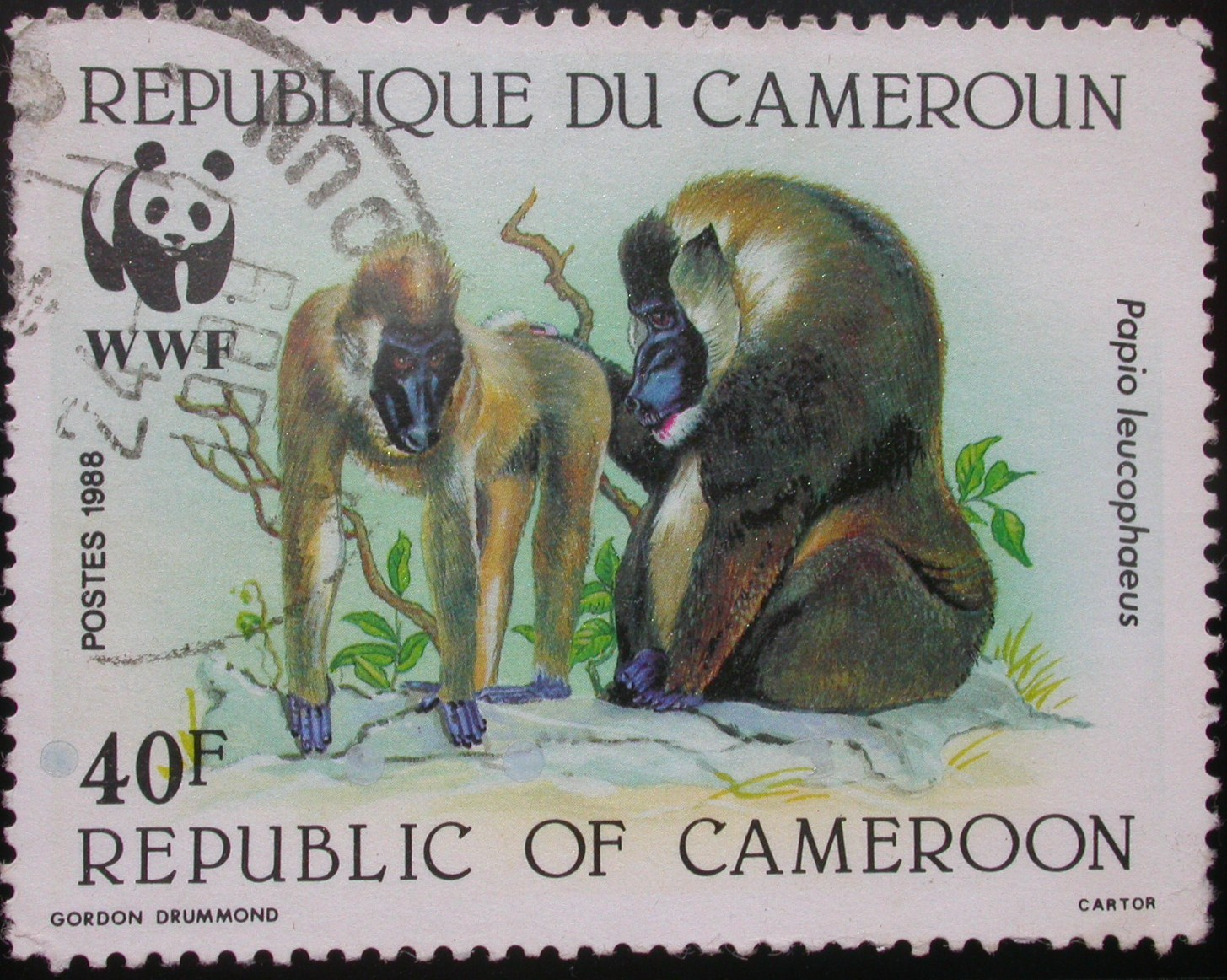
Stamp of the Republic of Cameroon, 1988

Postage stamps have been used in Cameroon or Cameroun since the nineteenth century.

== German protectorate ==
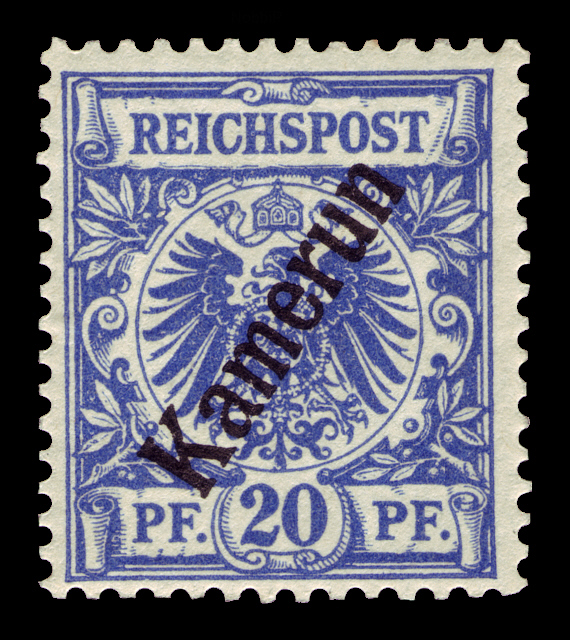
An 1897 overprinted German colonial stamp for Cameroon

Cameroon became a German Protectorate in 1884 and used German colonial stamps overprinted Kamerun in 1897. In 1900, the Yacht series common to all of German colonies were issued.

== French occupation ==
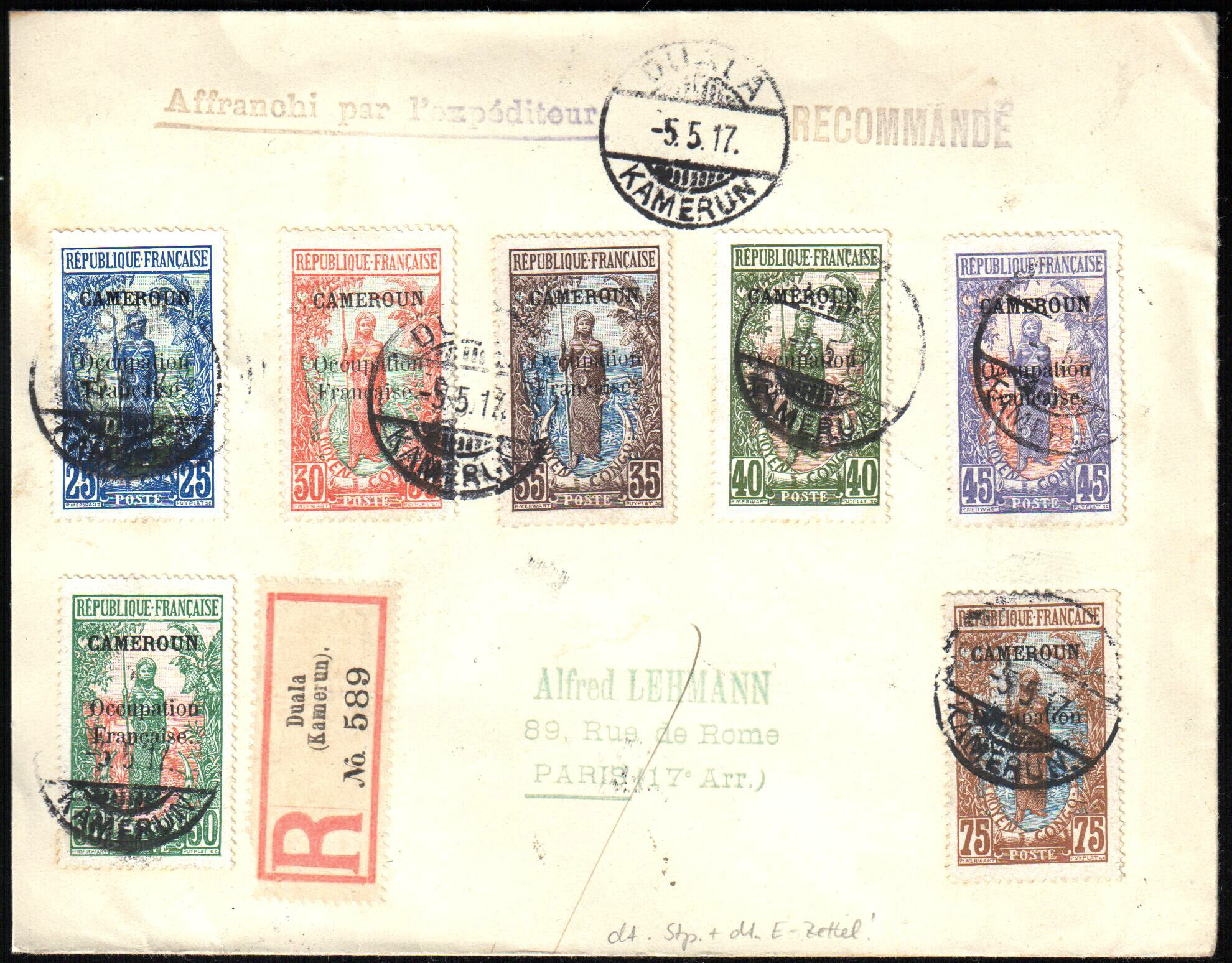
A cover with French occupation stamps

During World War I, from 1914 to 1916 it was occupied by Allied Troops. Stamps of Gabon overprinted Corps Expeditionnaire Franco-Anglais Cameroun in 1915, and stamps of Middle Congo overprinted Occupation Française du Cameroun in 1916 were used by the French forces in Cameroon until the 1920s.

== Joint mandate ==
In 1922 Britain and France were granted separate United Nations mandates. In the French mandate, stamps inscribed ‘Cameroun’ were issued from 1925. For the British mandate, see postage stamps and postal history of the British Cameroons.

== Current issues ==
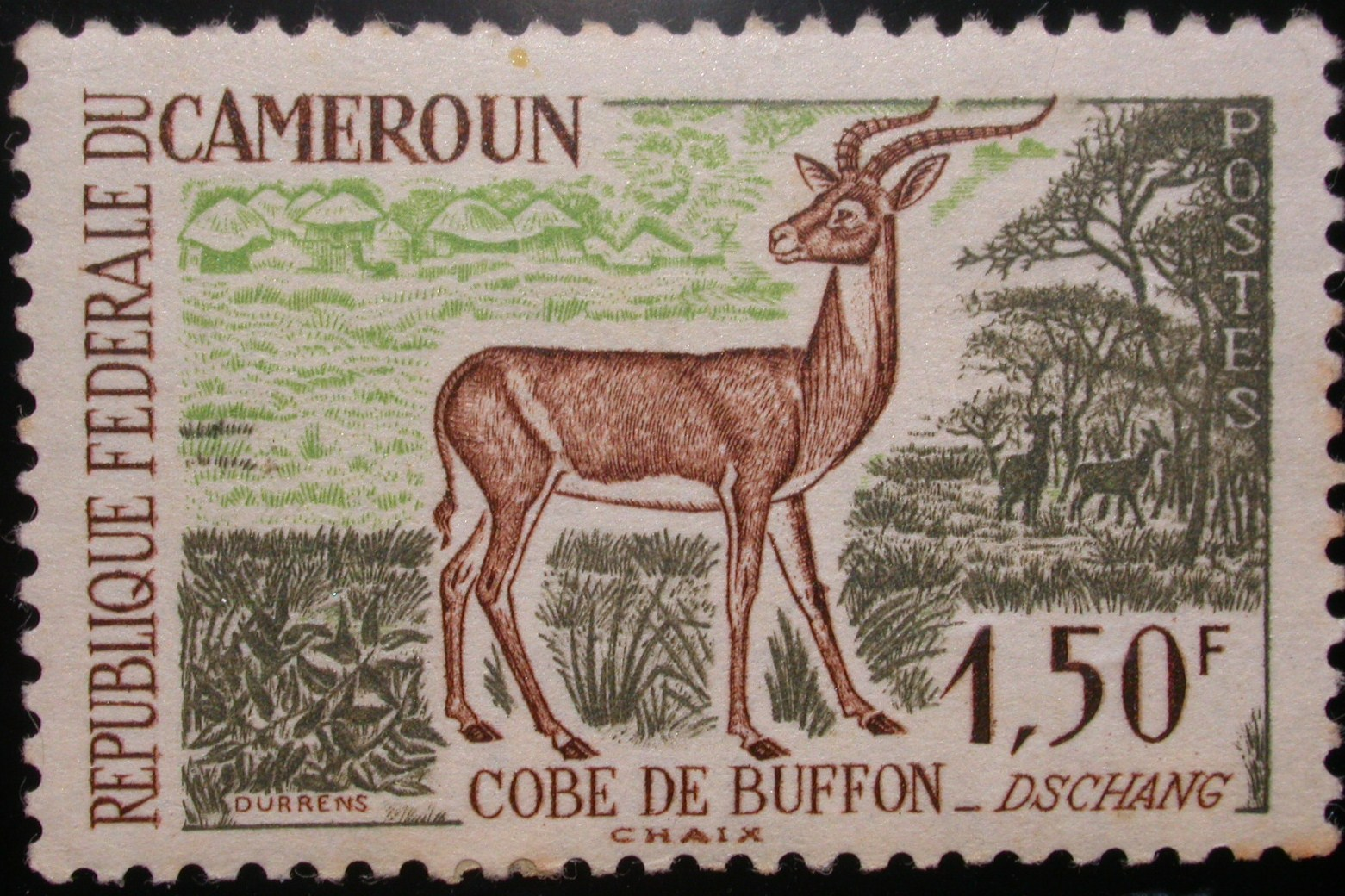
Stamp of the Federal Republic of Cameroun issued in 1962

The French mandate of Cameroun became an independent republic in 1960. Cameroon was joined by the southern part of British Cameroons in 1961 to form the Federal Republic of Cameroon. The country was renamed the United Republic of Cameroon in 1972, and the Republic of Cameroon in 1984. Today, issues vary in the language used. Some issues may be in French reading Rèpublique du Cameroun and others may be in English, reading Republic of Cameroon.

== See also ==
- Postage stamps and postal history of the British Cameroons
