= Prostitution in Cameroon =

Prostitution in Cameroon is illegal but tolerated, especially in urban and tourist areas. In the capital, Yaoundé the main area of prostitution is the neighbourhood of Mini Ferme. UNAIDS estimate there are 112,000 sex workers in the country.

Cameroon attracts sex tourism from the West, especially for child prostitution. The Cameroonian government has attempted to stop this trade by agreeing to multilateral agreements such as charters against sex tourism, like signing up with the Universal Federation of Travels Agents Associations (UFTAA).

== Legal situation ==
Section 343 of the Criminal Code criminalises "Whoever, of either sex, engages habitually for gain, in sexual intercourse with others." The punishment is imprisonment of 6 months to 5 years and a fine. As 'habitual' is difficult to prove, this law is rarely enforced. The same section also prohibits solicitation.

Section 294 of the code criminalises "Whoever procures, aids or facilitates another person's prostitution, or shares in the proceeds of another person's prostitution, whether habitual or otherwise, or who is subsidised by and person engaging in prostitution." The punishment is imprisonment of 6 months to 5 years and a fine, however is there is coercion involved, a minor is involved (under 21) or if he is the manager, owner or otherwise in control of an establishment where prostitution takes place, the punishment is doubled.

Section 361 of the code criminalised adultery for both sexes. Married prostitutes and clients therefore both commit an offence, but this is rarely enforced.

Law enforcement is sometimes corrupt. Sex worker report being arrested for not carrying an identification card and having to pay a bribe to be released. Sexual assaults, rape and having unprotected sex with officers to be released have also been reported.

== HIV ==
As in other West and central African countries, HIV is a major issue. Sex workers are one of the high risk groups. Access to health care and antiretroviral (ARTs) medicines for sex workers has improved. UNAIDs reported that in 2016 the estimated HIV prevalence amongst sex workers was 24.3%.

In 2005, American biopharmaceutical company Gilead Sciences, proposed carrying out clinical tests of a new antiretroviral drug on prostitutes in Douala. These trials were opposed, including by anti-AIDS activist group ACT UP.

== Sex trafficking ==
Cameroon is a source, transit, and destination country for women and children subjected to sex trafficking. Child traffickers often use the promise of education or a better life in the city to convince rural parents to give their children over to an intermediary, who then exploits the children in sex trafficking; traffickers also kidnap victims, as heightened public awareness of trafficking has led parents to be less willing to give their children to intermediaries. Sometimes relatives subject children to sex trafficking within the country. Homeless children and orphans are especially vulnerable to trafficking. Teenagers and adolescents from economically disadvantaged families are often lured to cities by the prospect of employment but are subjected to sex trafficking.

Cameroonian women and men are lured to Europe and other regions by fraudulent internet marriage proposals or offers of well-paying jobs, and subsequently are subjected to forced prostitution. Cameroonians from disadvantaged social strata, rural areas, and students are increasingly exploited in sex trafficking in the Middle East, especially Kuwait and Lebanon, as well as in Europe, including Finland, the United States, and multiple African countries, including Nigeria. Some Cameroonian women reported being recruited for domestic work in Kuwait but sold at “slave shops” upon arrival for sex trafficking. Trafficking networks typically involve destination-country recruitment agencies that use Cameroonian intermediaries to fraudulently recruit fellow Cameroonians for work abroad. Reports suggest local awareness-raising activities targeting fraudulent recruitment have caused intermediaries to operate with greater discretion, often directing victims to travel to the Middle East through neighbouring countries, including Nigeria. Some evidence indicates Cameroonian trafficking networks in Morocco force women into prostitution. Cameroonian women also transit Morocco en route to Europe, where they are often forced into prostitution by European trafficking networks.

The government incorporated its 2011 anti-trafficking law into the penal code as Section 342-1 “Trafficking and Slavery of Persons.” The government published the penal code in French and English, the two official languages of the government. The French version defines “trafficking in persons” (“la traite de personnes”) in line with the 2000 UN TIP Protocol, whereas the English version defines “trafficking in persons” to require movement. In addition, although the English version does not define “exploitation,” its definition of “slavery in persons” does not require movement and criminalizes most forms of human trafficking. Contrary to international law, both versions require the use of threat, fraud, deception, force, or other forms of coercion in sex trafficking crimes against children. Section 342-1 prescribes penalties of 10 to 20 years imprisonment and a fine of 50,000 to one million CFA francs (FCFA) ($80 $1,608) for “la traite de personnes”/“slavery in persons.” There are enhanced penalties if the trafficking victim is 15 years old or younger, if a weapon is used, or if the victim sustains serious injuries as a result of being subjected to trafficking.

The United States Department of State Office to Monitor and Combat Trafficking in Persons ranks Cameroon as a 'Tier 2' country.
