= Chinese people in Cameroon =

Total population
- 2,000+ (2008)

Regions with significant populations
- Douala, Yaoundé, Bamenda

Related ethnic groups
- Overseas Chinese

There were estimated to be more than two thousand Chinese people in Cameroon as of 2008.

== Migration history ==
In the early stages of Cameroon-China relations, established in 1971, there were only a few dozen Chinese people in the country. Large-scale migration of Chinese businesspeople began around 1995. By 2006, China's official Xinhua News Agency estimated that roughly one thousand lived in the country, and by 2008, their numbers had more than doubled.

== Business and employment ==
Since the mid-1990s, the number of Chinese migrants setting up traditional Chinese medicine (TCM) clinics, pharmacies, and even mobile medicine stands has been increasing. By 2000, nearly every town in Cameroon had at least one TCM clinic, and Yaoundé and Douala each had six. Patients at the clinics state that the drugs are cheap and effective; however, local doctors deride TCM as "quackery" and have urged public health authorities to increase their regulation of it.

There are also conflicts between Chinese and local merchants in other sectors. In the northwestern city of Bamenda, some Chinese have also taken to selling what the locals have dubbed "Chinese doughnuts" (beignet Chinoise) produced from local flour. Their competitors claim that the government levies no taxes on the Chinese traders, and have even threatened to drive them out with violence. Some consumers prefer their products due to the low price, while others refuse to patronise Chinese vendors and purchase only from local women instead. In Douala's Akwa district, there has been conflict between Chinese shop-owners and local peddlers who occupy the sidewalk spaces in front of the Chinese-owned shops; the Chinese blame them for blocking the entrances to their shops and drawing crowds which may increase crime, while the peddlers in turn blame the Chinese for causing overcrowding. Many of the peddlers actually buy from Chinese-owned wholesalers and sell their goods at retail.

Chinese merchants complain that they are specifically targeted by customs officials to pay large bribes; they sent a memo of grievance to Chinese president Hu Jintao in January 2007 complaining about harassment by tax and security officials, and even held a work-stoppage and street march in July 2007 in Douala to protest the situation.

There are also an increasing number of sex workers, colloquially referred to as "Shanghai beauties".

== Organisations ==
Chinese businesspeople in Cameroon have made three attempts to establish a chamber of commerce (Chinese General Association of Industry and Commerce of Cameroon/喀麦隆华侨华人工商总会) to coordinate their activities and promote a favourable business environment in Cameroon for their members. Following a failure in 2000, the most recent attempt was made in Douala in November 2005. The officers elected at that meeting were:

- President: Chen Bosong, the general manager of the Na'aisi Company (纳爱斯公司总经理陈伯松)
- First vice-president: Yuan Yulong, the general manager of the Haida Fisheries Company (海达渔业公司总经理袁玉龙)
- Second vice-president: Wang Fengyu, general manager of the China Commerce City (中国商城总经理汪凤玉)
- Second vice-president: Zhang Guicheng, general manager of the Wanfu Company (万福公司总经理张贵成)
- Second vice-president: Li Jiaxiang, general manager of the Asia-Africa Company (亚非公司总经理李桂香)

== Integration and community ==
Chinese traders are seen as easy targets for crime because they often carry large amounts of cash, and according to the local Chinese embassy, the number of violent incidents targeting Chinese people has been increasing sharply. The first murder of a Chinese person in Cameroon occurred in February 2005; in response, more than four hundred Chinese businesspeople took to the streets of Yaoundé to protest the violence and the police's lack of progress in investigating the crime. Some crimes involve Chinese people victimising other Chinese, such as an attack on a trader by six other Chinese in November 2008 which left her in hospital. The victim in that attack claimed that relations between Chinese people in Cameroon were "not healthy" and called on Cameroonian authorities to pay more attention to the situation. Among the six who attacked her, one is allegedly connected to the mistress of a senior officer in Cameroon's military.
