= National Observatory on Climate Change (Cameroon) =

National Climate Observatory on Climate Change
- Abbreviation: NOCC / ONACC
- Founded: December 2009
- Location: Cameroon
- Key people: Amougou Joseph Armathé
- Website: Official website

The National Observatory on Climate Change (NOCC) is a governmental organisation in Cameroon responsible for monitoring and evaluating the socioeconomic and environmental impact of climate change in the country.

== History ==
The creation of the NOCC was first announced in a speech by the Head of State Paul Biya at the UN General Assembly in New York in 2009. The organization was created in December 2009 by decree number 2009/410 of December 10, 2009. It was later reorganized in 2019 by decree number 2019/026 January 18, 2019.

It became operational in 2015.

== Missions ==
The mission of the NOCC is to monitor and evaluate the socio- economic and environmental impact of climate change and proposing measures to prevent alleviate and/or adapt to the adverse effects and hazards related to climate change.

As such, the observatory is in charge of:

- Monitoring climates trends, providing meteorological and climatological data to all the relevant sectors of human activity and drawing up Cameroon's annual climate reports;
- Initiating and promoting studies aimed at highlighting; the indicators, impacts, and hazards related to climate change
- Drawing up relevant climate indicators to monitor environmental policy
- Conducting prospective analyses aimed at proposing a vision on the short, medium and long term climate trends
- Collecting and analysing reference data on climate change in Cameroon and providing such data to public and private decision-makers as well as the different national and international Bodies
- Initiating any sensitization activity and preventive information on climate change
- Proposing to the government the preventive measures to reduce the release of greenhouse gases, as well as measures to prevent and/or adapt to the adverse effects and hazards related to climate change.

== Organization ==
The observatory functions under the technical supervision of the Minister in charge the environment. It has two bodies: The executive board and the Management. The executive board is presided by Enoh Peter Ayuk and the Director is Amougou Joseph Armathé.

== Publications ==
- Climate Outlook for 2019, ONACC, Yaoundé, 2019
- Economic assessment of the impact of climate change on food crop yields in the Center, East, Far North and Southwest regions of Cameroon, ONACC, Yaoundé, 2019
- Atlas des Pertes du Couvert Forestier, ONACC, Yaoundé, 2021
