= Spatial Development in Cameroon =

Generally, spatial development is linked to include all the techniques used by planners, geographers and other actors of decision making to facilitate integrated balanced development. Spatial planning for development has no territorial barrier, ranging across continents, regions, nations and local communities. Various forms of spatial development qualities have been attributed mainly by the Developed World, while the Developing World and Cameroon in particular, are still trying to integrate the formula into their system. As such, to understand better spatial development in Cameroon, a brief notion of the African context is necessary.

== Summary of Spatial Development in the Africa context ==
Today, programmes that promotes spatial equity in national development are being given increased attention by international agencies and governments of developing nations, including Cameroon. Industrial expansion within the metropolitan centres is now given the same priority as agricultural policies. However, the inability to build a productive spatial system that integrates urban centres and rural hinterlands into mutual networks of production and exchange has led to a growing number of poor people in the developing nations.

One of the greatest challenges facing Africa today is to upgrade sustainable development in areas where poverty and other economic problems are pronounced. The issue of environmental development needs to be enforced, especially as the world is today speaking the environmental language. It might be surprising to note that, only a few countries in Africa have concrete spatial development plans, most of them situated in the extreme South and North of the continent. Good examples are seen in the Republic of South Africa where there is a development plan at the national level called Spatial Development Initiative (SDI), presently known as, the National Spatial Development Perspective (NSDP). The main aim of these plans is to encourage integrated development within a given space defined by its economic potential rather than by political boundaries. Most of the present day spatial development policies in African countries are linked to their colonial history. That is, development plans mainly in the form of transport and infrastructure were focused along the coast and other sources of raw materials in the hinterlands. This is one of the reasons for spatial inequality in most African countries. Therefore, there is an urgent need for new approaches of spatial development to obtain equity in enhancement.

== Cameroon and Spatial Development ==
=== History ===
Spatial development in Cameroon dates as far back as the German colonial era. The influence of the Germans through trade and commerce, created a number of trading ports which later became townships. Development plans were purely aimed at export and recruiting areas for soldiers and labourers. Townships whose growth and development could be attributed to this include amongst others, Buea, Kumba, Bamenda, Yaoundé and Douala. Apart from the above policies, the Germans used zoning and racial residential segregation as instruments of land use in the country.

Like the Germans, when the British took over the Western part of Cameroon, they spent no time in establishing growth and development of settlements. Most of the government buildings were on hill tops, overlooking the remote indigenous settlements. Good examples are the GRAs (Government Residential Areas) in Limbe and Buea, and the hilltop station buildings in Bamenda, meant for high class residential only.

History of Cameroon has made it understandable that Cameroon’s experience in spatial planning began in 1966 and span up to 1976 with the introduction of the first and second Five Year Social and Economic Development Plans. The objective was to equitably share the economic resources and fruits of economic progress. The 1961 constitutions placed the spatial planning machinery exclusively into the hands of the Presidency and the National Assembly. In his capacity as the Chief of State of the United Republic of Cameroon, the President had to define the main lines of planning in a Presidential Circular and takes the major decision. On its part, the National Assembly debates and votes on laws to approve the plans.

Planning at the national level was carried out by the Ministry of Planning and Territorial Development. Together with its various departments the ministry was responsible for planning medium and long term development. At the provincial level, the Economic service collected, centralised and handed data to the Governor and the Minister and also organised social development plans at the Provincial Planning Board. At the Divisional level, the Divisional Development Committee was chaired by the Prefect and comprised Mayors, Deputies and private individuals.

=== Present Situation ===
Recent spatial planning and development policies in Cameroon are a legacy of its colonial history. Most of the land use plans initiated by the colonial masters have been maintained and strengthened by the country’s planning authorities. This has greatly increased the developmental gap between the colonial townships that are presently urban towns and the rural areas.

Cameroon cannot boast of a real National Spatial Development Plan. Most of the documents emphasising spatial development exist at the regional and local levels but are faced by problems of implementation. The country has a fashionable 'integrated', 'basic need-oriented', 'bottom-up' and 'development-from-within' regional policy programmes. In discussing such a programme and proposing elements of a modified development strategy, it can, however, be argued that even the first step of creating a basic regional development project has been far from satisfactory. Furthermore, in spite of government public speaking, no regional development policy as normally defined exists. What do exist are regional effects of development projects. This prompts the question of whether it may be preferable to replace the term 'regional development policy', with regional 'project policy'.
