= International rankings of Cameroon =

These are the international rankings of Cameroon

== Economy ==
- World Economic Forum Global Competitiveness Report 2014-2015 ranked 116 out of 144

== Government ==
- Press Freedom Index 2014 ranked 131 out of 180
- Transparency International Corruption Perceptions Index 2014 ranked 136 out of 175

== Military ==
- Institute for Economics and Peace Global Peace Index 2014 ranked 113 out of 162

== Technology ==
- World Intellectual Property Organization: Global Innovation Index 2026, ranked 121 out of 139 countries
