= International University, Bamenda =

Coordinates: 5°57′46″N 10°9′32″E

International University, Bamenda (IUB) is the oldest private university in Cameroon; created in 1990 (35 years ago) by Dr. Patrick Chefu Fusi, incorporated No. 00056 and Approved (No. 11/0507/MINESUP/SG/DDES/05/10/2011 & 17/0363/MINESUP/SG/DDES/12/08/2012) by the Ministry of Higher Education to confer Bachelor, Master and Doctorate Degrees in 154 specialties allocated under 9 fields of study as follows: Management: 14, Business Administration: 12, Education: 23, agriculture: 19, Medicine: 27, Law: 15, Art: 13, Sciences: 10 and Engineering: 21.

IUB has partnered with Rural World Resources International (RWRI), an NGO for providing access to basic amenities (water, electricity, clean fuels, education, communication, transportation, agriculture, food processing, income generation, etc) in rural and peri-urban communities. The partnership is for training of engineers in agriculture, technology, environment, renewable energy, rural development and food processing. Degrees conferred are Bachelor and Master of Science (B Sc & M Sc) in Engineering.

The Engineering Campus is located 1 km West of Bamenda Airport, on the Ntambeng, Mankon-Mambuh, Bafut Road.
