= Cameroonian economic crisis =

The Cameroonian economic crisis was a downturn in the economy of Cameroon from the mid-1980s to the early 2000s. The crisis resulted in rising prices in Cameroon, trade deficits, and loss of government revenue. The government of Cameroon acknowledged the crisis in 1987. Outside observers and critics blamed poor government stewardship of the economy. The government instead placed the blame on the fall of the prices of export commodities, particularly a steep drop in the price of petroleum. President Paul Biya announced that "all our export commodities fell at the same time."

Cameroon's trade partners, particularly France, Germany, and the United States, offered to help the country, but Cameroon balked at their condition that the country follow strict cost cutting suggestions laid out by the International Monetary Fund (IMF). Instead, Cameroon formulated its own plan. Civil servants lost access to subsidised electricity, housing, and telephones; parts of the government's vehicle fleet were sold; older civil servants were forced into retirement; the official working schedule was changed; economic missions in foreign embassies from Cameroon were closed; and state and parastatal enterprises were privatised. The 1987–1988 budget reduced government spending by 18%, the first time in the country's history that the budget decreased.

The measures met with international approval, but violent crime rose as a result. Cameroon's plan also failed to rein in corruption. By October 1988, the intended effect was less than had been hoped, and Cameroon agreed to an IMF aid package worth $150 million and accepted a structural adjustment program (SAP) loan from the World Bank. The African Development Bank, France, Germany, and the United Kingdom loaned the government further funds. Cameroon has since focused on paying off its international debt and further restricting public salaries and pay rises to civil servants.

However, the consensus among Cameroonians both at home and overseas is that the economic hardship is as a result of public funds theft by the Biya administration. Members of his regime constantly steal public funds and build mega structures in other countries such as France without any serious legal action being taken by the Biya administration. Biya himself is known to have resorts in Europe where he spends more time enjoying the proceeds of his theft than he does in his own country.
