= University of Maroua =

Public university in Cameroon

Coordinates: 10°21′00″N 14°11′24″E

The University of Maroua
- Université de Maroua (French)
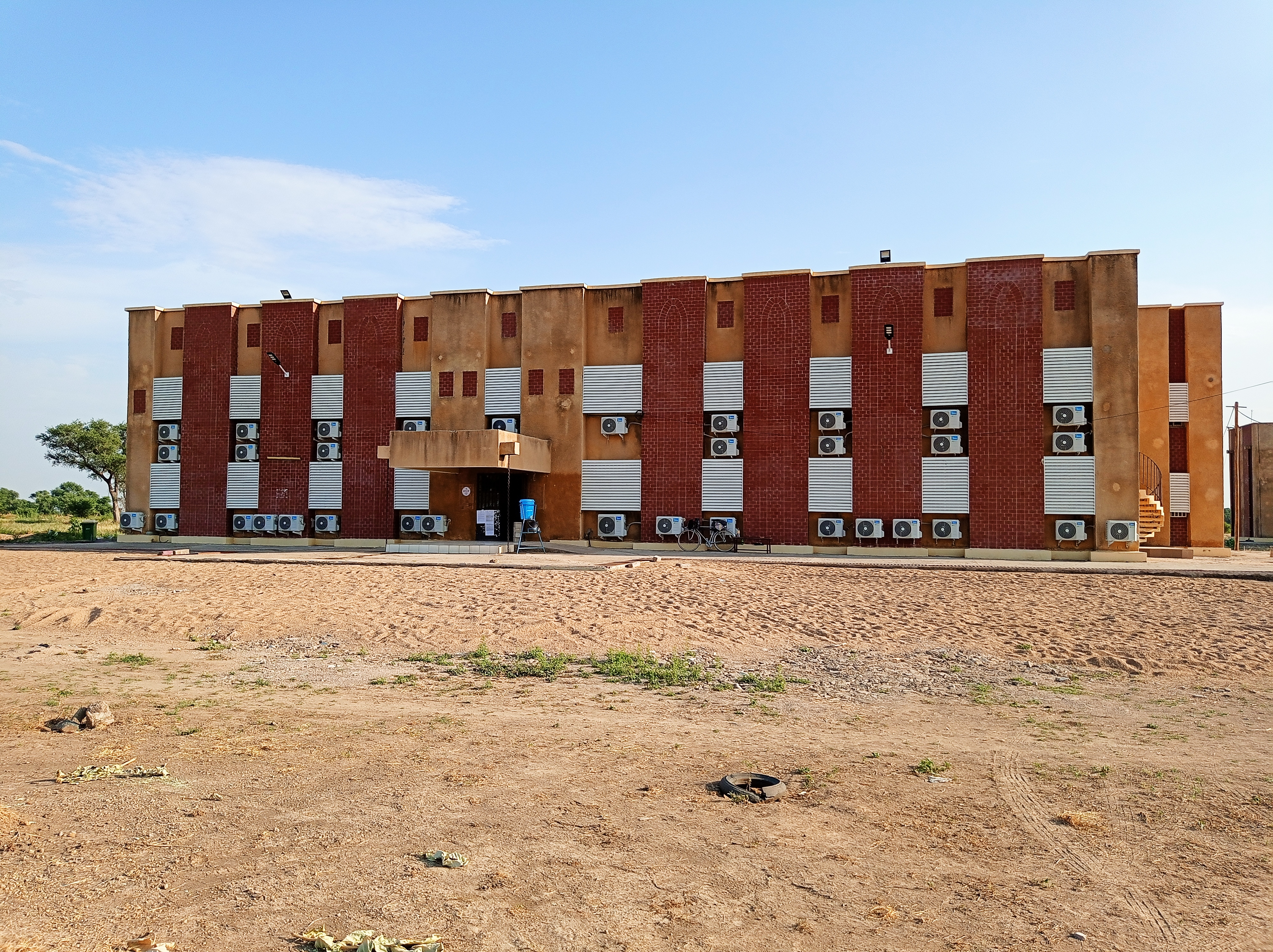
- Motto in English: Science, Wisdom, Service
- Type: Public
- Established: 2008; 18 years ago
- Location: Maroua, Cameroon
- Campus: Urban
- Website: University website

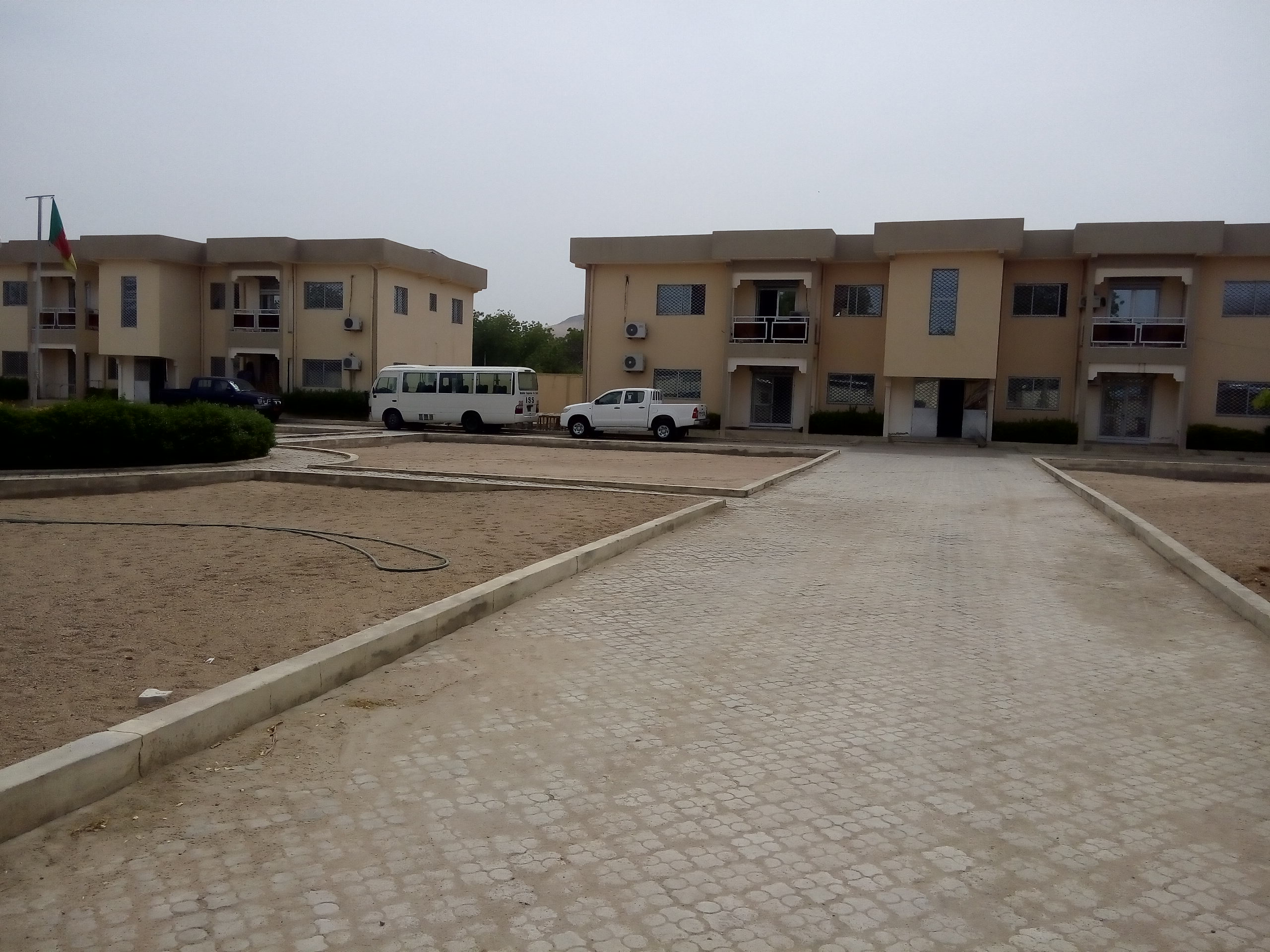
Rectorate of the University of Maroua

University of Maroua (French: Université de Maroua) is a public university located in Maroua, Cameroon. It was established in 2008.

== Faculties ==
The University has 4 faculties and 3 Higher Schools as follows:

- Faculty of Economics and Management (FSEG)
- Faculty of Science (FS)
- Faculty of Arts and Letters and Social Sciences (FALSH)
- Higher Teacher Training College
- Higher National Polytechnic School of Maroua (ENSPM)
- Faculty of Mines and Petroleum Industries (FMIP)

== Ranking ==
In February 2024, the University was ranked 7th in Cameroon, 6633rd in the global 2024 rating.
