= Toghu =

Traditional embroidered garment of Cameroon

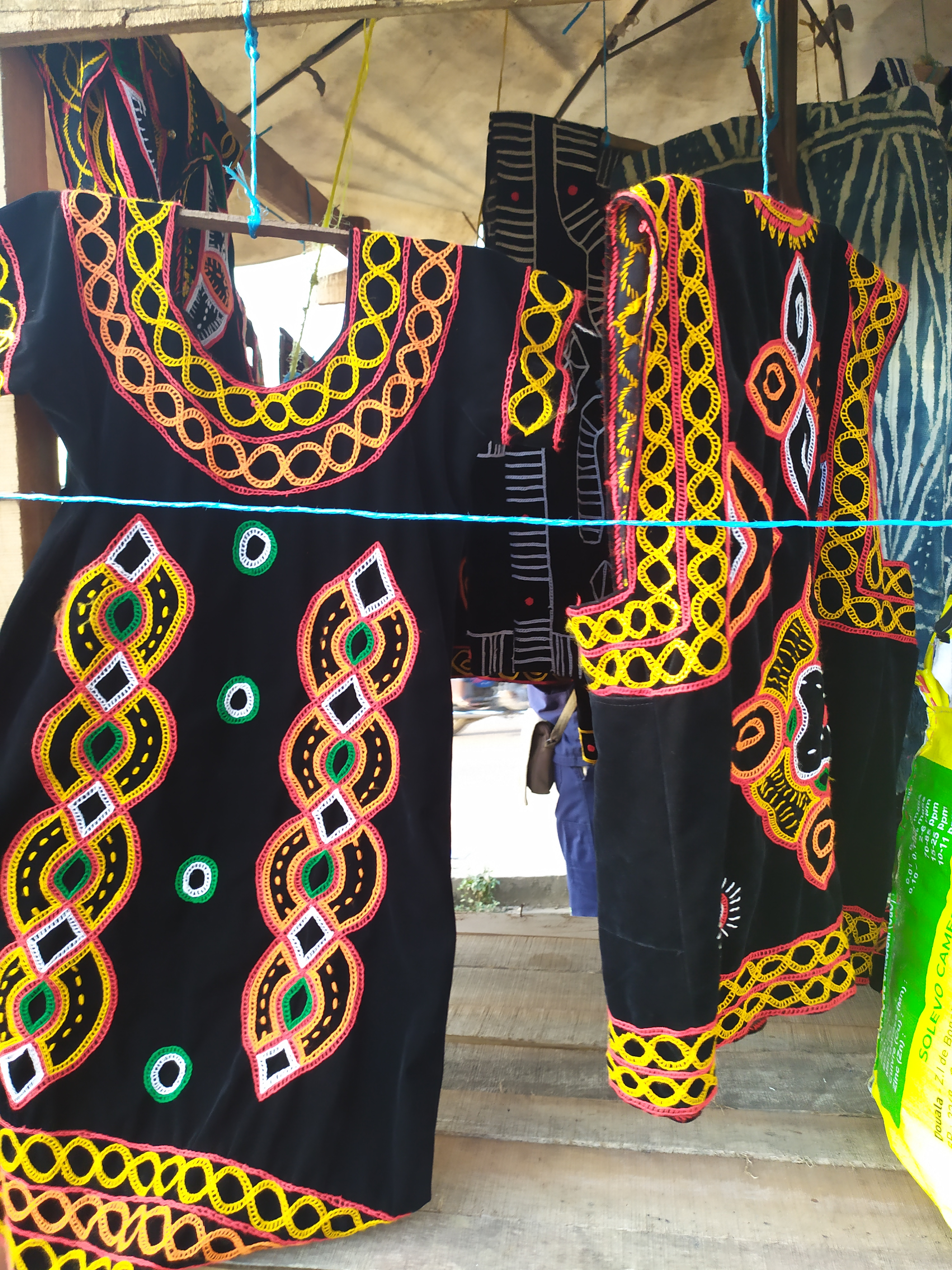
- Toghu garments
- Type: Ceremonial garment
- Material: Velvet, embroidery thread
- Place of origin: Grassfields, Cameroon

Toghu, or atoghu, is a traditional royal garment of the Grassfields peoples of the Northwest and West regions of Cameroon, made of black velvet embroidered with brightly coloured patterns.

Originally reserved for chiefs and notables, it is now worn more widely on festive occasions and by the Cameroonian diaspora as a symbol of cultural identity.

== History ==
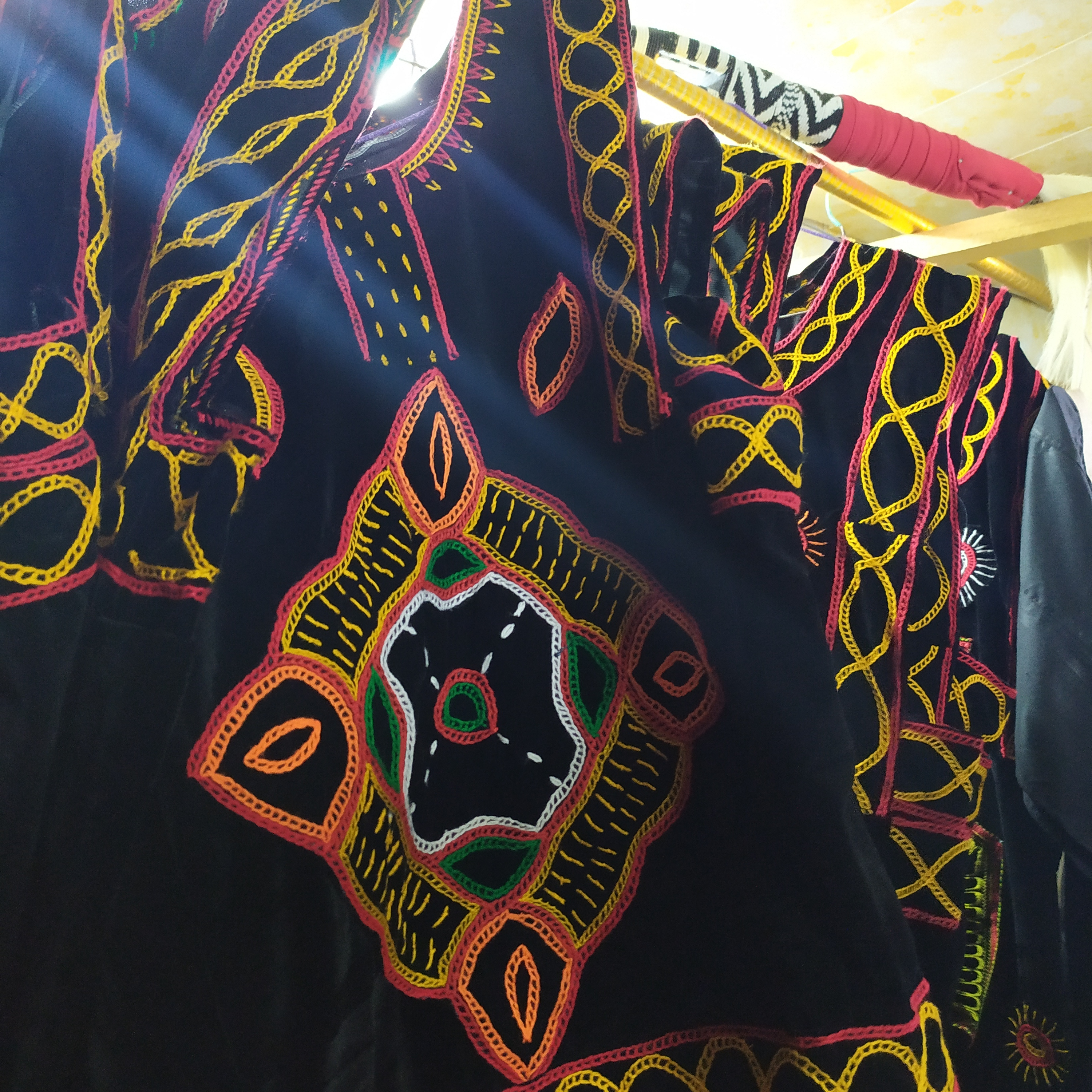
Toghu tunic

The toghu originated as a royal cloth around Bamenda, worn by men and women of the chiefs' families and by notables.

== Description ==
The garment is traditionally made of black velvet, hand-embroidered with thread or bands in yellow, orange, ochre, red and white. It is used to make wide tunics: straight, regular bands of embroidery run along the collar, cuffs and hem, while the body of the tunic bears diamonds, stars and other motifs.

== Today ==
Use of the toghu has spread beyond chieftaincies, but it remains a garment for celebrations. Modern versions use lighter fabrics instead of velvet and take many forms, including wax prints and cotton printed with toghu patterns.

In September 2021 the New York–based blogger Maybell Boma launched the Toghu Army Movement to promote the garment; it was presented in January 2022 at a reception at the Yaoundé residence of Akere Muna.

== See also ==
- Bamileke people
- Kente cloth
- Dashiki
