= Tam-Tam à Paris =

Movie documentary

- Directed by: Thérèse Sita-Bella
- Release dates: 1963
- Running time: 30 Minutes
- Country: Cameroon
- Language: French

Tam-Tam à Paris is a 30 minute documentary, directed by Thérèse Sita-Bella one of the fist female film makers from Africa.

== Plot ==
Tam-Tam à Paris documented The National Dance Company of Cameroon, during its tour in Paris.It was featured in the first FESPACO in 1969.

== Production ==
The documentary was directed by Thérèse Sita-Bella, in 1969. It has been cited as the first film by a woman from Sub-Saharan Africa.
