= High Court of Justice (disambiguation) =

High Court of Justice is the name of several courts:

- In the United Kingdom:
  - High Court of Justice (England and Wales)
  - High Court of Justiciary in Scotland
  - High Court of Justice in Northern Ireland
  - High Court of Justice for the Trial of Charles I and other royalist figures
- In Ireland:
  - High Court of Justice in Ireland, a historic court in Ireland
  - High Court (Ireland), formerly known as the "High Court of Justice of Ireland"

Others

- High Court of Justice (France)
- High Court of Justice (Cameroon)
- High Court of Justice in Rivers State, Nigeria
- High Court of Justice (Israel)
- Court of First Instance of the High Court of Hong Kong, formerly the High Court of Justice of the Supreme Court of Hong Kong

== See also ==
- High court
- Superior court
- Supreme court
- High Court of Parliament (disambiguation)
