= National Day (Cameroon) =

Holiday in Cameroon

Unitary State Day
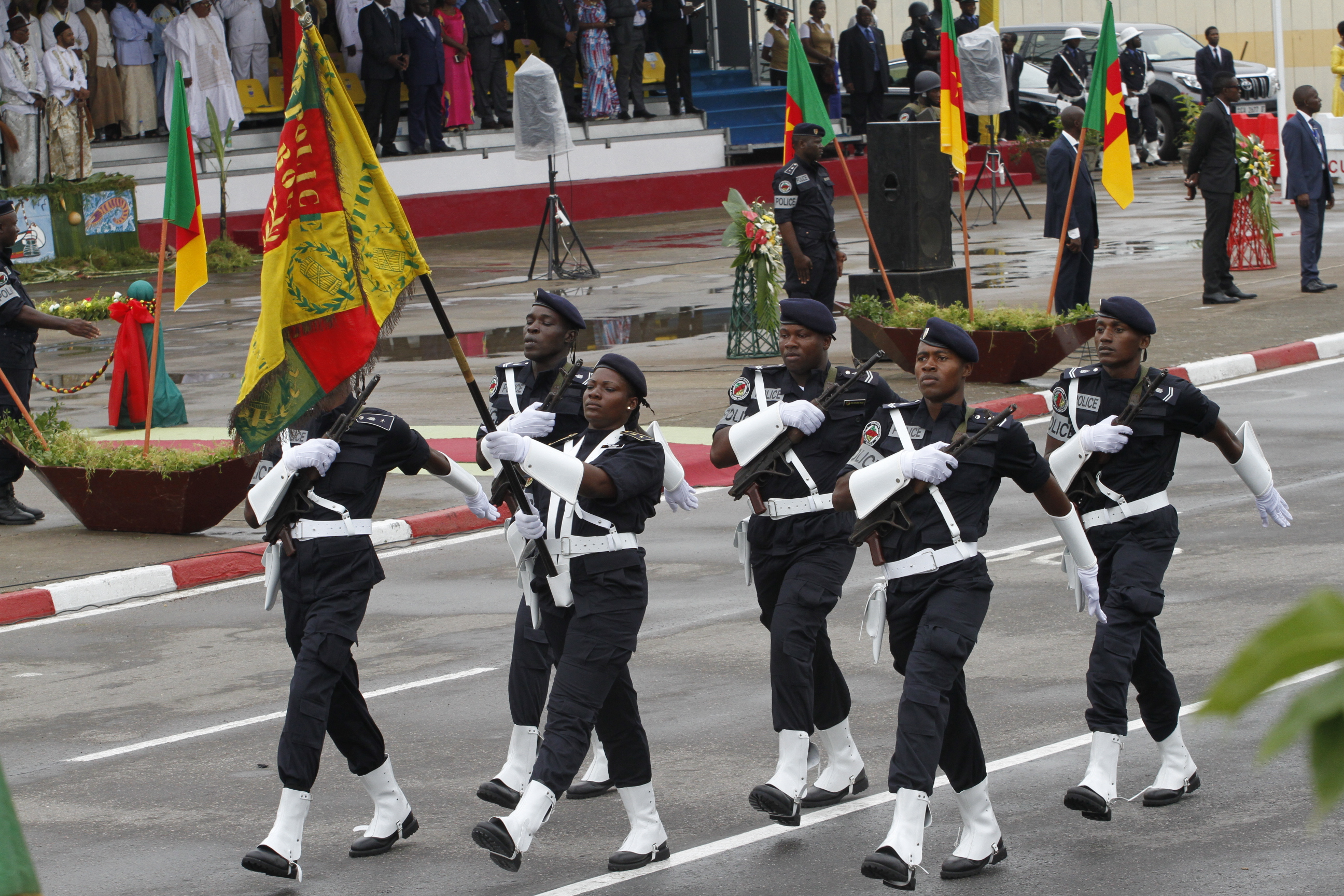
- Police marching in the 2016 Unitary State Day parade, Douala
- Also called: National Day
- Observed by: Cameroon
- Date: May 20
- Next time: 20 May 2026
- Frequency: annual

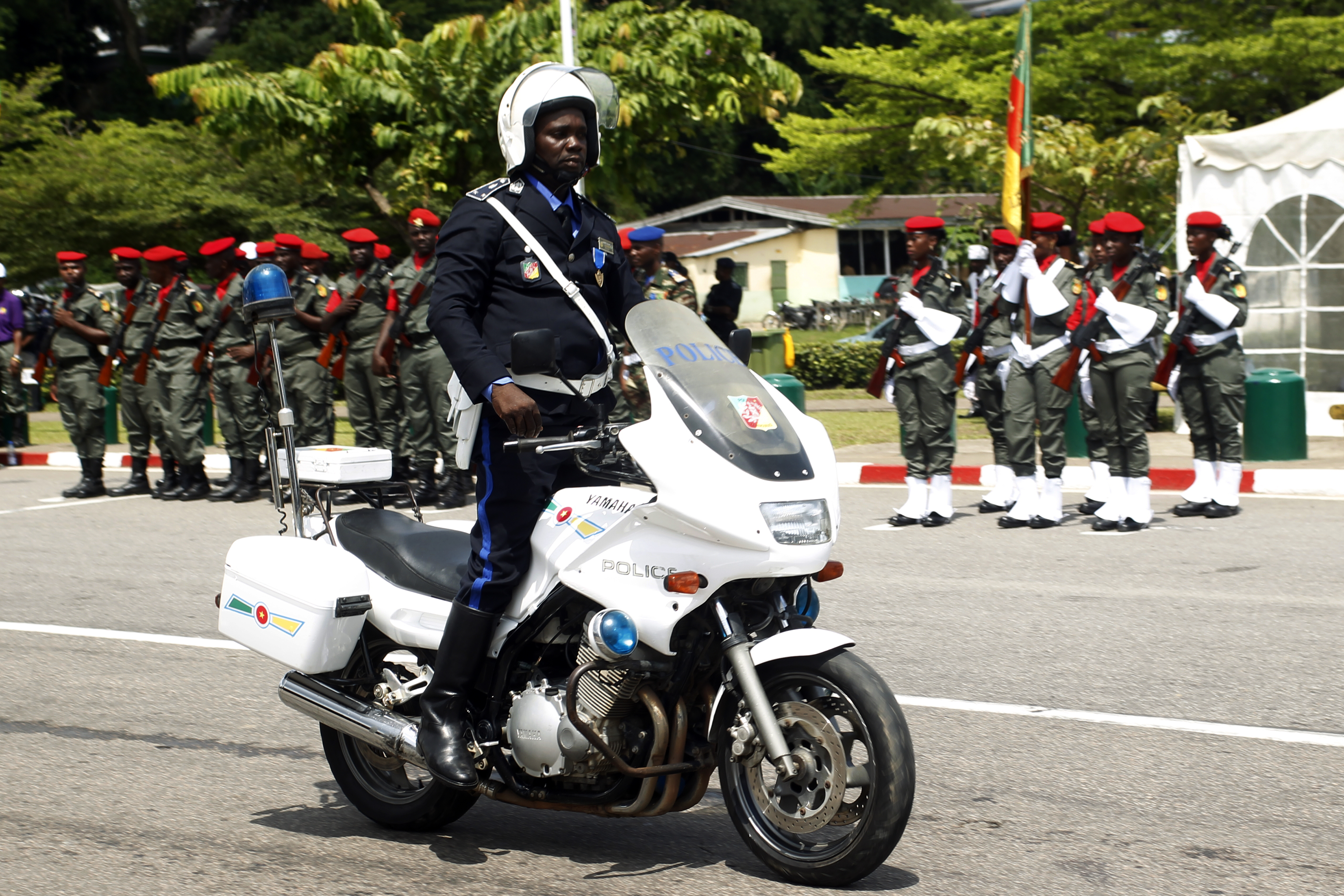
Police in the Unity Day parade, 2019, Douala

The National Day (French: Fête Nationale) of Cameroon, also known as Unitary State Day (fête nationale de l'État unitaire), is celebrated annually on 20 May. In a national referendum on 20 May 1972, Cameroonians voted for a unitary state as opposed to the existing federal state. The United Nations Trust Territory known as French Cameroun achieved independence from France on 1 January 1960, and British Southern Cameroons a Trusteeship under British administration achieved independence by joining French Cameroun on 1st October 1961 federated to form The Federal Republic of Cameroon. The government chose 20 May as Cameroon's National Day to commemorate President Ahmadou Ahidjo's abolishment of the federal system of government in favor of a unitary country in 1972.

Even though it is considered a holiday, children all over the country go to schools and celebrate Unity Day usually by singing, carrying out parades or marches all around the different parts of their various cities. Speeches are made by the president of Cameroon and other important personalities. The day is presided over by the president in the capital, Yaoundé. In the regional capitals, it is presided by the governor who represents the government. The divisional officers preside over the day in their various divisions.

== Events ==
The 47th National Day was marked in Cameroon in 2019 amidst violence in Anglophone parts of the country. The main opposition parties, the Cameroon Renaissance Movement and Social Democratic Front, boycotted the events "in solidarity with the lives lost in the English speaking regions."

National Day festivities in the country were cancelled both in 2020 and 2021 as a result of the COVID-19 pandemic.
