= Louis Henri Ngantcha =

Cameroonian politician

Member of the National Assembly of Cameroon
- Incumbent
- Assumed office 2020
- Constituency: Moungo-Nord

President of REP-COD
- Incumbent
- Assumed office 29 April 2020

Personal details
- Born: Loum, Cameroon
- Party: Cameroon People's Democratic Movement (CPDM)

Louis Henri Ngantcha is a Cameroonian politician and member of the National Assembly of Cameroon, representing the constituency of Moungo Nord. He is also the founding president of the Network of Parliamentarians for the Diaspora, Decentralized and Cross-Border Cooperation (REP-COD).

== Early life and education ==
Louis Henri Ngantcha was born in Loum, Cameroon, in the Littoral region. Ngantcha lived in France for nearly thirty years, gaining experience within diaspora communities before returning to Cameroon to pursue public service.

== Political career ==
=== Mayor of Loum ===
Before becoming a national lawmaker, Ngantcha served as mayor of the Loum arrondissement. During his administration, he initiated urban development projects such as road rehabilitation, construction of public classrooms, and electrification of the Babong canton. He also supervised the establishment of a communal health centre in Bonkeng aimed at improving healthcare accessibility for rural populations.

=== Member of the National Assembly ===
Ngantcha was elected to the National Assembly as deputy for Moungo-Nord during the tenth legislature. He serves on the Commission of Foreign Affairs, contributing to parliamentary oversight on diplomatic relations and international cooperation. Additionally, he chairs several parliamentary friendship groups, including the Cameroon–Austria and Cameroon–United Arab Emirates groups, aiming to strengthen bilateral legislative ties.

=== President of REP-COD ===
REP-COD (Réseau des Parlementaires pour la Coopération Décentralisée et Transfrontalière) was created on 29 April 2020 by the National Assembly to institutionalise dialogue with Cameroon's diaspora. Ngantcha was appointed as its first president and tasked with defining its strategic orientation. Under his leadership, the platform has held consultations with diaspora organizations worldwide, encouraged diaspora-led investments, and facilitated mediation between expatriate communities and Cameroonian institutions.

In 2025, Ngantcha led a parliamentary economic mission in France and Belgium aimed at promoting trade opportunities, attracting diaspora investors, and strengthening transnational partnerships.

== Views and policy positions ==
Ngantcha advocates for increased engagement of the Cameroonian diaspora in national development, emphasizing their economic, diplomatic and cultural contributions. He supports the creation of institutional frameworks to facilitate diaspora investment, entrepreneurship, and knowledge exchange. He has also publicly expressed support for the adoption of dual nationality, arguing that many Cameroonians abroad maintain strong patriotic ties and should be granted full civic inclusion.

== Publications ==
- Cameroun-Diaspora (2025) – A nonfiction work analyzing the role of the Cameroonian diaspora in national development, public policy, and diplomatic influence.

== Personal life ==
Ngantcha is married and has three children. His family resides in France while he carries out his parliamentary responsibilities in Cameroon.

== See also ==
- Politics of Cameroon
- Cameroonian diaspora
- National Assembly (Cameroon)
