= Breast flattening =

Breast flattening may refer to any of the following practices:

- Breast ironing
- Breast binding
- Breast reduction
