= Unification Day (Cameroon) =

Public holiday in Cameroon

- Traditional dancers at Unification Day meeting in Douala, 2017
- Observed by: Cameroon, Cameroonian diaspora
- Significance: Anniversary of the unification of the Southern Cameroons and French Cameroon
- Date: 1 October
- Next time: 1 October 2027
- Frequency: Annual

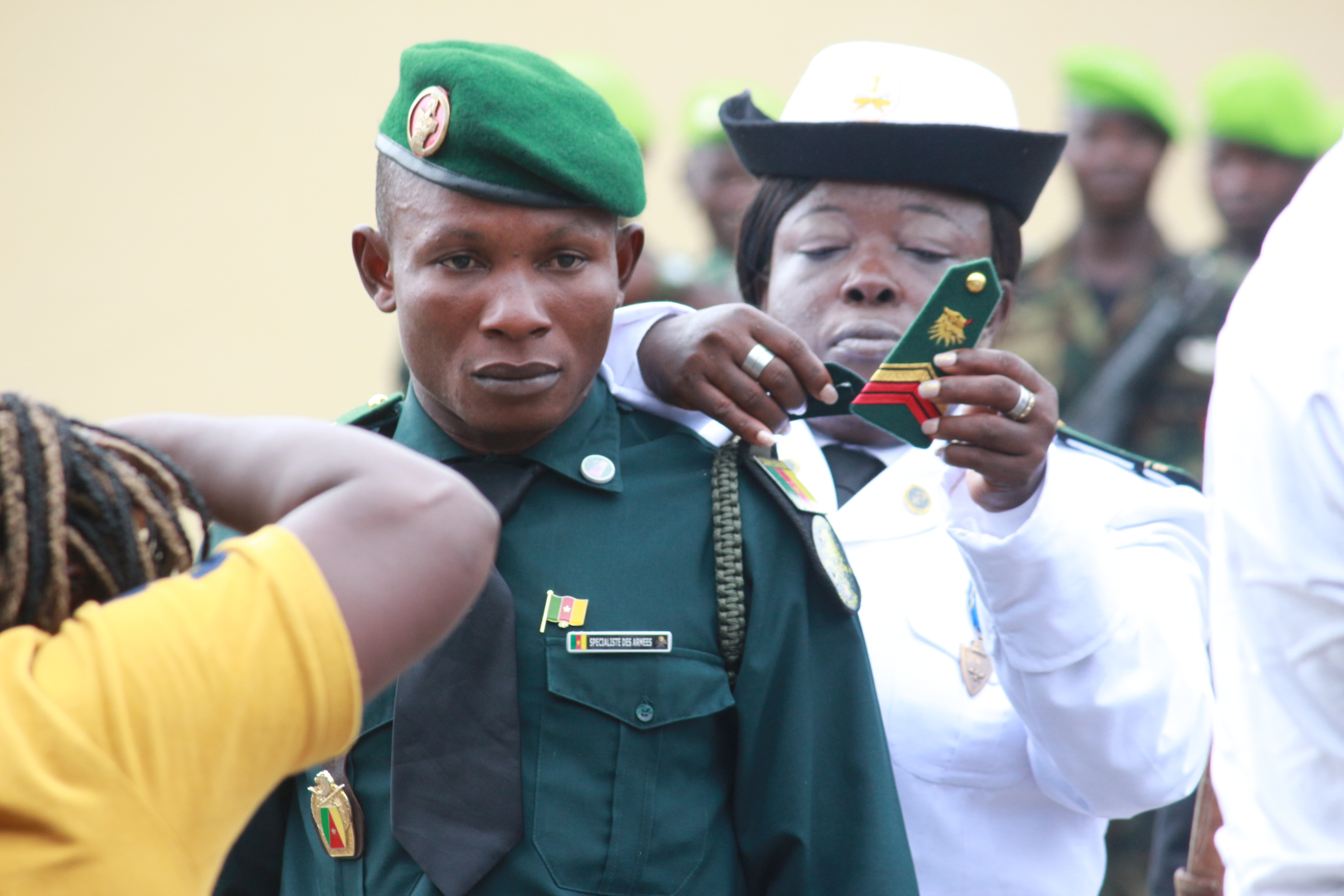
A soldier's uniform is prepared for a parade (Douala, Unification Day 2017)

Soldiers parade in Douala, Unification Day 2017

Unification Day (French: Journée de l'unification) is a public holiday in Cameroon. It celebrates the anniversary of a plebiscite held on 1 October 1961 in British Cameroon, in which voters in the Southern Cameroons voted to unite with French Cameroon. British Cameroon and French Cameroon had been mandate territories created from the division of Kamerun, a German colony forfeited to the Allies after Germany's defeat in World War I.

== See also ==
- Anglophone Crisis
