= Thérèse Sita-Bella =

Cameroonian film director

- Born: Thérèse Bella Mbida; 1933
- Died: 27 February 2006 (aged 72–73); Yaoundé
- Citizenship: Cameroonian
- Occupation: Film director

A young Sita-Bella, working as a pilot.

Thérèse Sita-Bella (1933–27 February 2006), born Thérèse Bella Mbida, was a Cameroonian film director who became the first woman filmmaker of Africa and Cameroon.

== Early life and education ==
She was born into the Beti tribe in southern Cameroon, and received her education from Catholic missionaries. In the 1950s, after obtaining her baccalaureate from a school in the Cameroonian capital of Yaoundé, she went to Paris in order to continue her studies. It was in France that her interest in journalism and in film developed.

== Career ==
In 1955, Sita-Bella started her career as a journalist. Later on, in 1963, Sita-Bella became the first woman filmmaker in Cameroon and all of Africa. From 1964 to 1965, Sita-Bella worked in France at the French newspaper La Vie Africane, which she co-created. After returning to Cameroon in 1967, she joined the Ministry of Information and became the Deputy Chief of Information.

== Tam Tam à Paris ==
In 1963, Sita-Bella directed the documentary Tam-Tam à Paris, which followed a troupe from the Cameroonian National Ensemble during a tour of Paris. Tam Tam à Paris is frequently cited as being the first film by a woman from sub-Saharan Africa. In 1969, Tam Tam à Paris featured at the first Week of African Cinema, a festival that was later to become known as FESPACO.

Sita-Bella was considered to be a trailblazer and one of the rare women working in the film industry that was being dominated by men. She spoke about the film industry in the 1970s by saying:

"Camerawomen in the 1970s? At that time we were very few. There were few West Indians, a woman from Senegal called Safi Faye and I. But you know cinema is not a woman's business".

== Death ==
On 27 February 2006, Sita-Bella died at a hospital in Yaoundé from colon cancer. Sita-Bella was buried at the Mvolye cemetery in Yaoundé.

== Honors ==
The Sita Bella film hall at the Cameroon Cultural Centre was named after her.
