= Louis-Marie Pouka =

Cameroonian poet

Louis-Marie Pouka (10 August 1910 - 5 September 1991) was a Cameroonian poet who advocated the assimilation of Cameroonian peoples into French culture. Pouka believed that colonialism was part of God's plan to bring African peoples into the wider world. His belief in the superiority of French culture and lifestyle is evident in his 1943 poem "Pleurs sincères", which "laments the indignities imposed on French citizens during German occupation" but makes no mention of cruel practices of French colonials in Cameroun, such as the imposition of forced labour on Africans.

Pouka moved to France in the 1940s. The society he found there failed to live up to his idealistic expectations, but he explained such elements away as deviations from God's plan for Cameroonians and the belief that God would punish those French people whom he found cruel or exploitative. Nevertheless, when Pouka returned to Cameroun in the 1950s, his poems were increasingly characterised by a "vague uneasiness". Pouka struggled to reconcile his belief in French culture and equality and his realisation that colonialism did not allow for the equality of Africans and Europeans.
