= National Anti-Corruption Observatory =

The National Anti-Corruption Observatory is a government body in Cameroon that investigates political corruption, organises anti-corruption initiatives, and monitors the government's anti-corruption efforts. The observatory is made up of 15 members and is part of the office of the prime minister. The body has no legal enforcement powers; relevant government bodies must prosecute any corruption allegations.

== History ==
The observatory was founded in January 2000 by President Paul Biya, then under pressure to respond to allegations of human rights violations in Cameroon. The U.S. State Department and Transparency International criticise the body as largely ineffectual due to its inability to prosecute accused corrupt members of government and its alleged lack of concrete accomplishments. The observatory received no funding in 2004, which the U.S. State Department cites as further proof of Cameroon's lukewarm approach to fighting corruption.
