= Breast ironing =

Type of body modification and harmful traditional practice

Breast ironing, also known as breast flattening, is the pounding and massaging of a pubescent girl's breasts, using hard or heated objects, to try to make them stop developing or disappear. The practice is typically performed by a close female figure to the victim, typically her mother, grandmother, aunt, or female guardian who will say she is trying to protect the girl from sexual harassment and rape, to prevent early pregnancy that would tarnish the family's name, to prevent the spread of sexually transmitted infections such as HIV/AIDS, or to allow the girl to pursue education rather than be forced into early marriage.

It is mostly practiced in parts of Cameroon, where boys and men may think that girls whose breasts have begun to grow are ready for sex. Evidence suggests that it has spread to the Cameroonian diaspora, for example to Britain, where the law defines it as child abuse. The most widely used implement for breast ironing is a wooden pestle normally used for pounding tubers. Other tools used include leaves, bananas, coconut shells, grinding stones, ladles, spatulas, and hammers heated over coals. The ironing practice is generally performed around dusk or dawn in a private area such as the household kitchen to prevent others from seeing the victim or becoming aware of the process, particularly fathers or other male figures. The massaging process could occur anywhere between one week to several months, depending on the victim's refusal and the resistance of the breasts; in cases where the breasts appear to be consistently protruding, the ironing practice may occur more than once a day for weeks or months at a time.

== History ==
Breast ironing may be derived from the ancient practice of breast massage. Breast massage aims to help even out different breast sizes and reduce the pain of nursing mothers by massaging the breast with warm objects.

== Incidence ==
The breast ironing practice has been documented in Nigeria, Togo, Republic of Guinea, Côte d'Ivoire, Kenya, and Zimbabwe. Additionally it has been found in other African countries, including Burkina Faso, Central African Republic (CAR), Benin, and Guinea-Conakry. Breast "sweeping" has been reported in South Africa. The practice has become commonly associated with Cameroon as a result of media attention and local levels of activism from human rights groups. All of Cameroon's 200 ethnic groups engage in breast ironing, with no known relation to religion, socio-economic status, or any other identifier. A 2006 survey by the German development agency GIZ of more than 5,000 Cameroonian girls and women between the ages of 10 and 82 estimated that nearly one in four had undergone breast ironing, corresponding to four million girls. The survey also reported that it is most commonly practiced in urban areas, where mothers fear their daughters could be more exposed to sexual abuse. Incidence is 53 percent in the Cameroon's southeastern region of Littoral. Compared with Cameroon's Christian and animist south, breast ironing is less common in the Muslim north, where only 10 percent of women are affected. Some hypothesize that this is related to the practice of early marriage, which is more common in the north, making early sexual development irrelevant or even preferable. Research suggests that 16% of girls, particularly in the far North regions where child marriages are highly common, try to flatten their own breasts in an attempt to delay early sexual maturity and early marriage.

A 2007 journal suggested that social norms in Cameroon result in women lacking bodily autonomy, as Cameroonian women are not socialized to negotiate safer sex practices, while Cameroonian men are encouraged to engage in polygyny and to take concubines. This lack of bodily autonomy contributes to an increased incidence of breast ironing, sexual coercion, and the normalization of early marriage practices. In an interview, one human rights activist stated that parents who resist under-aged marriages "usually point to the fact that the girlʼs breasts have not grown meaning that she is not yet ready for sexual intercourse. For parents who practice child marriage, by ironing the breasts of the prospective bride, they can continue receiving goods and services from their in-laws."

A 2008 report suggested that the rise in the incidence of breast ironing is due to the earlier onset of puberty, caused by dietary improvements in Cameroon over the previous 50 years. Half of Cameroonian girls who develop under the age of nine have their breasts ironed, and 38% of those who develop before eleven. Additionally, since 1976, the percentage of women married by the age of 19 has decreased from nearly 50% to 20%, leading to an increasingly long gap between childhood and marriage. The later age of marriage may be due to changed social norms that allow girls and women to attend school through university and to hold jobs in the formal sector; previously, girls entered married life young, wed to an older man without informed consent. Women who delay marriage in pursuit of education and career are more likely to be financially independent later in life, whereas girls who become pregnant are often forced to drop out of school and forgo formal employment.

One of the only full-length reports on breast ironing dates from 2011, when a Cameroonian NGO sponsored by GIZ called it "a harmful traditional practice that has been silenced for too long".

There are fears that the practice has spread to the Cameroonian diaspora, for example to Britain. A charity, CAME Women and Girls Development Organisation, is working with London's Metropolitan Police Service and social services departments to raise awareness of breast ironing.

== Health consequences ==
Breast ironing is widely reported to be extremely painful and can cause tissue damage. As of 2006, there have been no medical studies on its effects. However, medical experts warn that it might contribute toward breast cancer, cysts and depression, and perhaps interfere with breastfeeding later. In addition to this, breast ironing puts girls at risk of abscesses, cysts, infections, and permanent tissue damage, resulting in breast pimples, imbalance in breast size, and milk infection from scarring. In extreme cases of damage, there are currently ten cases of diagnosed breast cancer reported from women who identified as victims of breast ironing. Other possible side effects reported by GIZ include malformed breasts and the eradication of one or both breasts. The practice ranges dramatically in its severity, from using heated leaves to press and massage the breasts, to using a scalding grinding stone to crush the budding gland. Due to this variation, health consequences vary from benign to acute. The Child Rights Information Network (CRIN) reports the delay of breast milk development after giving birth, endangering the life of newborns.

Breast ironing can cause women to fear sexual activity.

Many women also suffer mental trauma after undergoing breast ironing. Victims feel as if it is punishment and often internalise blame, and fear breastfeeding in the future.

== Opposition ==
As well as being dangerous, breast ironing is criticised as being ineffective for stopping early sex and pregnancy. GIZ (then called "GTZ") and the Network of Aunties (RENATA), a Cameroonian non-governmental organization that supports young mothers, campaign against breast ironing, and are supported by the Ministry for the Promotion of Women and the Family. Some have also advocated a law against the practice; however, no such law has been passed. Some consider the practice to be an emerging human rights issue, recognized as an act of gender-based violence as breast ironing affects women and girls regardless of race, class, religion, socioeconomic background, or age. In regards to recent opposition, in 2000, the United Nations (UN) identified breast ironing as one of five intersecting forms of discrimination and overlooked crimes against women.

According to one Cameroonian lawyer, if a medical doctor determines that damage has been caused to the breasts, the perpetrator can be punished by up to three years in prison, provided the matter is reported within a few months. However, it is unclear if such a law exists as there are no recorded instances of legal enforcement.

The GIZ survey found that in 2006, 39 percent of Cameroonian women opposed breast ironing, with 41 percent expressing support and 26 percent indifferent. Reuters reported in 2014 that nationwide campaigning against the practice had helped reduce the rate of breast ironing by 50 percent in the country.

== See also ==
- Breast reduction
- Breast binding
- Female genital mutilation
- Mastectomy
- Amazons
- Thelarche, the stage of pubertal development at which breast buds appear
- Precocious puberty
