= Jean-Paul Ngassa =

Cameroonian filmmaker

- Citizenship: Cameroonian
- Occupation: Filmmaker
- Notable work: La Grande Case Bamiléké

Jean-Paul Ngassa (1939-2022) is a Cameroonian filmmaker.

He was born in Bana Bafang, Cameroon and graduated from the French Institute of Advanced Cinematographic Studies (IDHEC) in the 1950s.

He made the films Adventure en France (1962) and La Grande Case Bamiléké (1965) after French Cameroun's independence in 1960. He co-directed the former with Philippe Brunet. La Grande Case Bamiléké was co-directed by W. Hamon and received the "Best Documentary Award" at the 1966 World Festival of Black Arts.

In 1970, he directed the documentary Une nation est née, on the first ten years of Cameroon's independence.

Ngassa served as the first director of Cameroun Actualités, a semi-public film and image production company. From 1972 to 1976, he served as Secretary General of the Pan-African Federation of Filmmakers (FEPACI).
