= High Court of Parliament =

High Court of Parliament may refer to:

- In the United Kingdom, the formal name of Parliament.
- The High Court of Parliament Act, 1952, an attempt by the Nationalist government of South Africa to circumvent entrenched clauses in the constitution

== See also ==
- High court
- Superior court
- Supreme court
- High Court of Justice (disambiguation)
