= Telephone numbers in Cameroon =

- Country: Cameroon
- Continent: Africa
- Format: 2 XX XX XX XX (landline); 6 XX XX XX XX (mobile)
- Country code: +237
- International access: 00
- Long-distance: n/a

The following are the telephone codes for Cameroon.

== History ==
On November 21, 2014, numbers were expanded from 8 to 9 digits, by prefixing with 2 or 6.

1 June 2007 - national renumbering to 8 digits, when 7-digit numbers were expanded to eight digits.

September 2004 - new mobile number ranges assigned.

26 October 2001 - national renumbering to 7-digit plan Cameroon's previous 6-digit national numbers were changed to 7 digits on 26 October 2001. There was no indication of a permissive dialling period.

== Current calling formats ==
For calls within Cameroon, use just the 9 digits : 6640xxxxx
For calls from outside the country, add the code for Cameroon : '+237 6640xxxxx

== Changes as of November 21, 2014 ==
Old numbers	New numbers	Service/Carrier
+237 xxxxxxxx	+237 2xxxxxxxx	fixed, CAMTEL
+237 xxxxxxxx	+237 6xxxxxxxx	mobile

== Previous changes in 2007 ==
Old numbers	New numbers	Service/Carrier
+237 2xxxxxx	+237 22xxxxxx	fixed, CAMTEL
+237 3xxxxxx	+237 33xxxxxx	fixed, CAMTEL
+237 45xxxxx	+237 745xxxxx	mobile, MTN Cameroon
+237 46xxxxx	+237 746xxxxx	mobile, MTN Cameroon
+237 47xxxxx	+237 747xxxxx	mobile, MTN Cameroon
+237 48xxxxx	+237 748xxxxx	mobile, MTN Cameroon
+237 49xxxxx	+237 749xxxxx	mobile, MTN Cameroon
+237 5xxxxxx	+237 75xxxxxx	mobile, MTN Cameroon
+237 7xxxxxx	+237 77xxxxxx	mobile, MTN Cameroon
+237 8xxxxxx	+237 88xxxxxx	special services, all carriers
+237 40xxxxx	+237 940xxxxx	mobile, Orange Cameroun
+237 41xxxxx	+237 941xxxxx	mobile, Orange Cameroun
+237 42xxxxx	+237 942xxxxx	mobile, Orange Cameroun
+237 43xxxxx	+237 943xxxxx	mobile, Orange Cameroun
+237 44xxxxx	+237 944xxxxx	mobile, Orange Cameroun
+237 6xxxxxx	+237 96xxxxxx	mobile, Orange Cameroun
+237 9xxxxxx	+237 99xxxxxx	mobile, Orange Cameroun

== Previous changes in 2004 ==
September 2004 - new mobile number ranges assigned

New mobile number ranges were assigned.

+237 5xxxxxx for MTN (plus existing +237 7xxxxxx range)

+237 6xxxxxx for Orange (plus existing +237 9xxxxxx range, formerly SCM)

== Previous changes in 2001 ==
26 October 2001 - national renumbering to 7-digit plan Cameroon's previous 6-digit national numbers were changed to 7 digits on 26 October 2001. There was no indication of a permissive dialling period.

Former Number	New 7-digit Number	Carrier / service type
2xxxxx	22xxxxx	CAMTEL Geographic/Fixed number
30xxxx	230xxxx	CAMTEL Geographic/Fixed number
31xxxx	231xxxx	CAMTEL Geographic/Fixed number
32xxxx	332xxxx	CAMTEL Geographic/Fixed number
33xxxx	333xxxx	CAMTEL Geographic/Fixed number
34xxxx	334xxxx	CAMTEL Geographic/Fixed number
35xxxx	335xxxx	CAMTEL Geographic/Fixed number
36xxxx	336xxxx	CAMTEL Geographic/Fixed number
37xxxx	337xxxx	CAMTEL Geographic/Fixed number
38xxxx	338xxxx	CAMTEL Geographic/Fixed number
39xxxx	339xxxx	CAMTEL Geographic/Fixed number
4xxxxx	34xxxxx	CAMTEL Geographic/Fixed number
6xxxxx	76xxxxx	MTN mobile/GSM
7xxxxx	77xxxxx	MTN mobile/GSM
8xxxxx	98xxxxx	SCM Mobile/GSM
9xxxxx	99xxxxx	SCM Mobile/GSM
