= Kribi Deepwater Port =

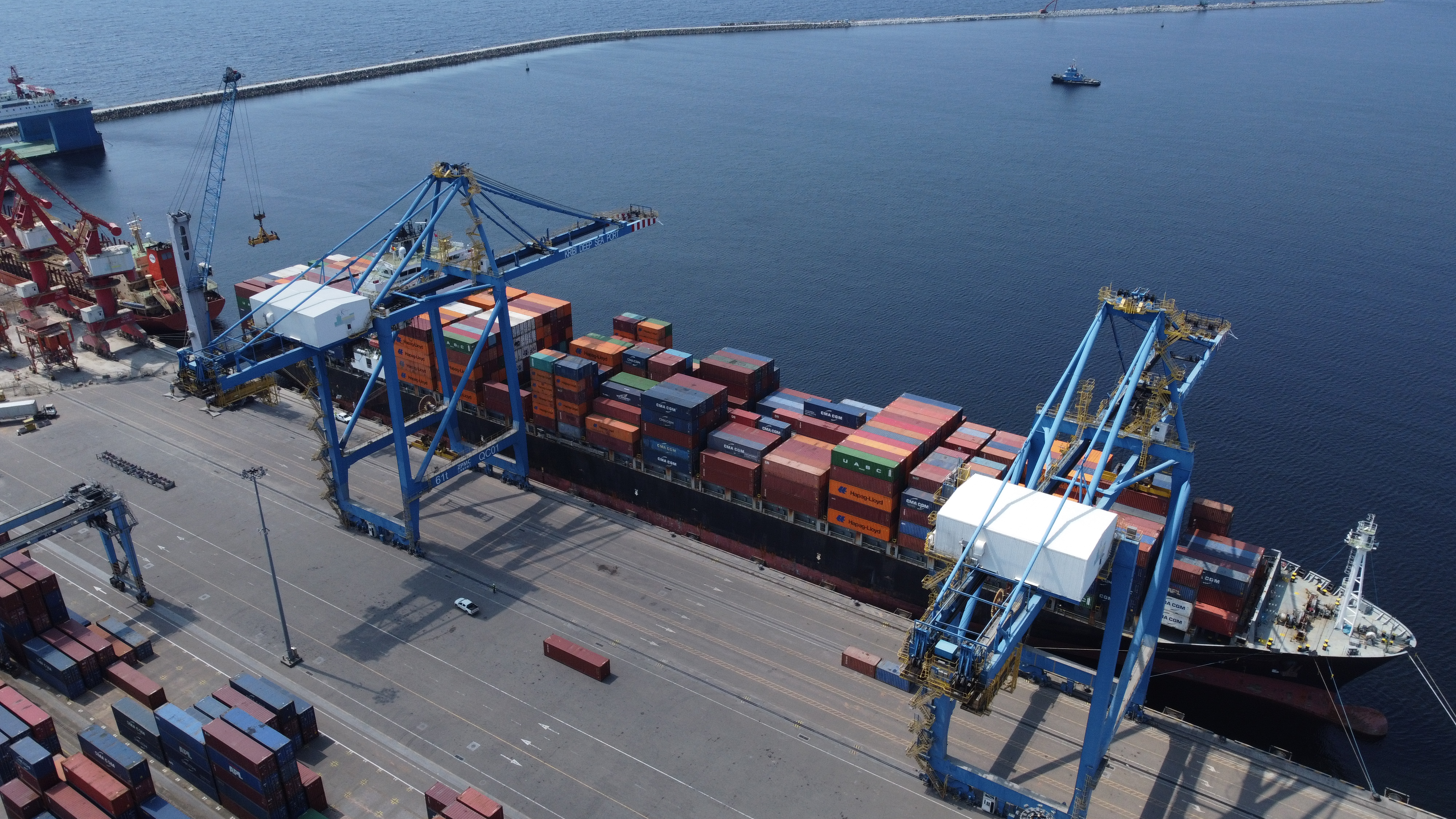
- Interactive map of Kribi Deepwater Port

Location
- Country: Cameroon
- Coordinates: 2°43′09″N 9°51′49″E

Details
- Type of harbour: Deepwater port for commerce

The Kribi Deepwater Port is a complex located 35 km south of the seaside town of Kribi on the Cameroonian coast, it borders the Gulf of Guinea and the Atlantic Ocean. The port of Kribi is a member port of the International Association of Ports and Harbors (IAPH).

== History ==
The Cameroonian government's decision to build the port on the Mboro site came in 2008 with the establishment of the steering committee. The work was entrusted to the China Harbour Engineering Company (CHEC). Construction work began in 2012. The first ships were welcomed in 2014, and a deep-draft vessel docked in March 2018.

== Railways ==
A standard gauge railways from the iron or mires at Mbalam and Nabeba in Congo is under construction in 2025. A link to the metre gauge line serving the river port at Douala is also proposed. This will take bauxite traffic.

== Condition ==
The deep-water port of Kribi is located near the main mining sites in Cameroon. It helps relieve congestion in the port of Douala, where the waiting times for ships can sometimes be several weeks. It also makes Kribi a major port hub with several new terminals. Since 2003, it has also been the outlet for the Chad-Cameroon oil pipeline.

== Construction ==
=== Objectives ===
This port infrastructure covers an area of 26,000 hectares. It includes: a general port with a container terminal, a multipurpose terminal, an aluminium terminal and associated plant; a hydrocarbon terminal associated with a storage area and a grain terminal; a methane terminal, and a natural gas liquefaction plant. In addition, there will be a marina, an industrial fishing port and a naval base.

=== Timelines and achievements ===
All the construction objectives will be executed between 2012 and 2040, for a total estimated cost of 6,500 billion FCFA. 20,000 direct jobs are planned, the same for indirect jobs.

Construction work on the deep-water port of Kribi began on December 27, 2010 with the launch of general earthworks for the construction of platforms to accommodate the land port facilities of the general port at Mboro. 60 hectares of forest were thus cleared.
