= Cameroon =

Country in Central Africa

Republic of Cameroon République du Cameroun (French)
- Flag Coat of arms
- Motto: "Paix – Travail – Patrie" (French) "Peace – Work – Fatherland"
- Anthem: "Chant de Ralliement" (French) "Rallying Song"
- Capital: Yaoundé; 3°51′41″N 11°31′14″E
- Largest city: Douala
- Official languages: French • English
- Recognised regional languages: Grassfields languages • Beti • Fufulde • Sawa • Hausa • Baka • Bassa • Chadian Arabic • Bafia • Gbaya • Pidgin • Camfranglais • Mandara
- Ethnic groups (2022): 22.2% Bamileke, Bamun; 16.4% Biu-Mandara; 13.5% Shuwa Arab, Hausa and Kanuri; 13.1% Beti-Bassa; 12.0% Fulani; 9.9% Tikar; 9.8% Adamawa-Ubangi (Mbum-Gbaya); 4.6% Sawa people; 4.3% Southwest Bantu; 2.3% Pygmy peoples; 3.8% others/foreigners
- Religion (2022): 66.3% Christianity; 33.1% Catholic; 27.1% Protestant; 6.1% other Christian; 30.6% Islam; 1.3% traditional faiths; 1.1% no religion; 0.7% other religions
- Demonym: Cameroonian
- Government: Unitary presidential republic under an authoritarian dictatorship
  - President: Paul Biya
  - Vice President: Vacant
  - Prime Minister: Joseph Ngute
  - President of Senate: Aboubakary Abdoulaye
  - President of National Assembly: Théodore Datouo
- Legislature: Parliament
  - Upper house: Senate
  - Lower house: National Assembly

Formation
  - Independence of French Cameroons from France: 1 January 1960
  - Independence of British Southern Cameroons from the United Kingdom and establishment of the Federal Republic of Cameroon: 1 October 1961
  - Cameroonian constitutional referendum of 1972 and establishment of the Unitary State: 20 May 1972
  - Current constitution: 18 January 1996

Area
  - Total: 475,442 km^{2} (183,569 sq mi) (53rd)
  - Water (%): 0.57

Population
  - 2025 estimate: ▲30,987,821 (51st)
  - Density: 39.7/km^{2} (102.8/sq mi)
- GDP (PPP): 2026 estimate
  - Total: ▲$183.320 billion (86th)
  - Per capita: ▲$5,960 (147th)
- GDP (nominal): 2026 estimate
  - Total: ▲$67.520 billion (91st)
  - Per capita: ▲$2,200 (152nd)
- Gini (2021): ▼42.2 medium inequality
- HDI (2023): ▲0.588 medium (155th)
- Currency: Central African CFA franc (XAF)
- Time zone: UTC+1 (WAT)
- Calling code: +237
- ISO 3166 code: CM
- Internet TLD: .cm
- 1. These are the titles as given in the Constitution of the Republic of Cameroon, Article X (English at the Wayback Machine (archived 28 February 2006) and French at the Wayback Machine (archived 28 February 2006) versions). 18 January 1996. The French version of the song is sometimes called Chant de Ralliement, as in Swarovski Orchestra (2004). National Anthems of the World. Koch International Classics; and the English version "O Cameroon, Cradle of Our Forefathers", as in DeLancey and DeLancey 61.

Cameroon, (Note: /ˌkæməˈruːn/ KAM-ə-ROON; French: Cameroun [kamʁun].) officially the Republic of Cameroon, (Note: French: République du Cameroun.) is a country in Central Africa. It shares boundaries with Nigeria to the west and north, Chad to the northeast, the Central African Republic to the east, and Equatorial Guinea, Gabon, and the Republic of the Congo to the south. Its coastline lies on the Bight of Biafra, part of the Gulf of Guinea, and the Atlantic Ocean. Due to its strategic position at the crossroads between West Africa and Central Africa, it has been categorized as being in both geostrategic locations. Cameroon's population of nearly 31 million people speak 250 native languages, in addition to the national tongues of English and French. The capital city of the country is Yaoundé.

Early inhabitants of the territory included the Sao civilisation around Lake Chad and the Baka hunter-gatherers in the southeastern rainforest. Northern Cameroon later became part of Kanem-Borno. Portuguese explorers reached the coast in the 15th century. Fulani soldiers founded the Adamawa Emirate in the north in the 19th century, and various ethnic groups of the west and northwest established powerful chiefdoms and fondoms.

Cameroon became a German colony in 1884 known as Kamerun. After World War I, it was divided between France and the United Kingdom as League of Nations mandates until independence in 1960 and 1961 respectively. The Union of the Peoples of Cameroon (UPC) political party advocated independence but was outlawed by France in the 1950s, leading to a national liberation insurgency between French Armed Forces and the Union of the Peoples of Cameroon (UPC) until January 1971. In 1960, the French-administered part of Cameroon became independent, as the Republic of Cameroun, under President Ahmadou Ahidjo. The southern part of British Cameroons federated with it in 1961 to form the Federal Republic of Cameroon. The federation was abandoned in 1972. The country was renamed the United Republic of Cameroon in 1972 and back to the Republic of Cameroon in 1984 by a presidential decree by President Paul Biya. Biya, the incumbent president, has led the country since 1982 following Ahidjo's resignation; he previously held office as prime minister from 1975 onward. Cameroon is governed as a unitary presidential republic. Biya is the world's longest-serving non-royal leader, having ruled for over four decades in an authoritarian manner. Consequently, his Cameroon People's Democratic Movement governs the country as a de facto one-party state.

The official languages of Cameroon are French and English. Christianity is the majority religion in Cameroon, with significant minorities practising Islam and traditional faiths. It has experienced tensions from the English-speaking territories, where politicians have advocated for greater decentralisation and even complete separation or independence (as in the Southern Cameroons National Council). In 2017, tensions over the creation of an Ambazonian state in the English-speaking territories escalated into open warfare. Large numbers of Cameroonians live as subsistence farmers. The country is often referred to as "Africa in miniature" for its geological, linguistic, and cultural diversity. Its natural features include beaches, deserts, mountains, rainforests, and savannas. Cameroon's highest point, at almost 4,100 metres (13,500 ft), is Mount Cameroon in the Southwest Region.

Cameroon's most populous cities are Douala on the Wouri River, its economic capital and main seaport; Yaoundé, its political capital; and Garoua. Limbé in the southwest has a natural seaport. Cameroon is well known for its native music styles, particularly Makossa, Njang, and Bikutsi, and its successful national football team. It is a member state of the African Union, the United Nations, the Organisation Internationale de la Francophonie (OIF), the Commonwealth of Nations, the Non-Aligned Movement, and the Organisation of Islamic Cooperation.

== Etymology ==
Originally, Cameroon was the exonym given by the Portuguese to the Wouri River, which they called Rio dos Camarões meaning 'river of shrimps' or 'shrimp river', referring to the then abundant Cameroon ghost shrimp. The country's name in Portuguese remains Camarões.

== History ==
=== Early history ===
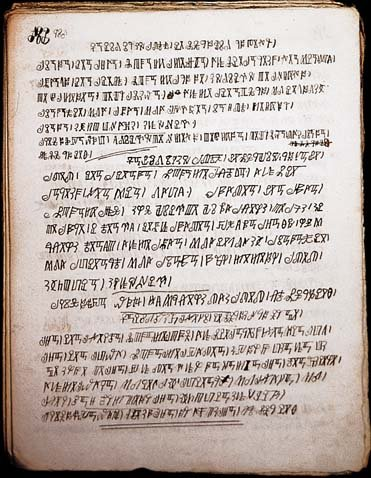
Bamum script is a writing system developed by King Njoya in the late 19th century.

Evidence from archaeological excavations at Shum Laka in the Northwest Region shows human occupation in Cameroon dating back 30,000 years. The longest continuous inhabitants are groups such as the Baka (Pygmies). From there, Bantu migrations into eastern, southern and central Africa are believed to have occurred about 2,000 years ago. The Sao culture arose around Lake Chad, c. 500 CE, and gave way to the Kanem and its successor state, the Bornu Empire. Kingdoms, fondoms, and chiefdoms arose in the west. In the 13th century, Ibn Saʿīd mentioned the ankarār people living to the south of Lake Chad. Dierk Lange interprets this as a probable corruption of Makari, the Kanuri name for the Kotoko. A later reference to makabī from al-Maqrīzī may also refer to Makari.

Portuguese sailors reached the coast in 1472. They noted an abundance of the ghost shrimp Lepidophthalmus turneranus in the Wouri River and named it Rio dos Camarões (Shrimp River), which became Cameroon in English. Over the following few centuries, European interests regularised trade with the coastal peoples, and Christian missionaries pushed inland.

In 1896, Sultan Ibrahim Njoya created the Bamum script, or Shu Mom, for the Bamum language. It is taught in Cameroon by the Bamum Scripts and Archives Project.

=== European colonisation ===
==== German Empire ====
Germany began to establish roots in Cameroon in 1868 when the Woermann Company of Hamburg built a warehouse. It was built on the estuary of the Wouri River. Later, Gustav Nachtigal made a treaty with one of the local kings to annex the region for the German emperor. The German Empire claimed the territory as the colony of Kamerun in 1884 and began a steady push inland; the natives resisted in the Bafut Wars and Adamawa Wars. Under the aegis of Germany, commercial companies were local administrations. These concessions used forced labour to run profitable banana, rubber, palm oil, and cocoa plantations. Even infrastructure projects relied on a regimen of forced labour. This economic policy was much criticised by the other colonial powers.

==== French and British mandates ====
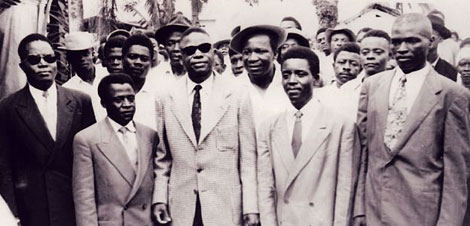
Leaders of the pro-independence UPC

With the defeat of Germany in World War I, Kamerun became a League of Nations mandate territory and was split into French Cameroon (French: Cameroun) and British Cameroon in 1919. France integrated the economy of Cameroon with that of France and improved the infrastructure with capital investments and skilled workers, modifying the colonial system of forced labour. Britain offered German owned plantations to the highest bidder with the intent of paying the proceeds into a World War I reparations account. But few investors were willing to buy at the London auctions. Eventually Britain sold the majority of German plantations in British Cameroon back to their original German owners and opened up African maritime ports for German trade. The British also encouraged German investment in the Tanganyika Territory. German companies built warehouses in Douala but were not allowed to purchase land.

The British administered their territory from neighbouring Nigeria. Natives complained that this made them a neglected "colony of a colony". Nigerian migrant workers flocked to Southern Cameroons, ending forced labour altogether but angering the local natives, who felt swamped. The League of Nations mandates were converted into United Nations Trusteeships in 1946, and the question of independence became a pressing issue in French Cameroon.

France outlawed the pro-independence political party, the Union of the Peoples of Cameroon (French: Union des Populations du Cameroun, UPC), on 13 July 1955. This prompted a long guerrilla war waged by the UPC and the assassination of several of the party's leaders, including Ruben Um Nyobè, Félix-Roland Moumié and Ernest Ouandie. In the British Cameroons, the question was whether to reunify with French Cameroon or join Nigeria; the British ruled out the option of independence.

=== Republic of Cameroon ===
On 1 January 1960, French Cameroun gained independence from France under President Ahmadou Ahidjo as the Republic of Cameroon. The southern part of British Cameroons federated with it in 1961 to form the Federal Republic of Cameroon until 1972, when the federation was abandoned and the country renamed the United Republic of Cameroon. In 1984, President Paul Biya restored the name Republic of Cameroon via presidential decree.

==== Federal Republic of Cameroon ====
Flag of the Federal Republic of Cameroon

On 1 October 1961, the British Southern Cameroons gained independence from the United Kingdom by vote of the UN General Assembly and merged into the Republic of Cameroon to form the Federal Republic of Cameroon. The federal republic was composed of two federated states, East Cameroon and West Cameroon, each with its own legislature, government, and prime minister. 1 October is now observed as Unification Day, a public holiday. Ahidjo used the ongoing war with the UPC to concentrate power in the presidency, continuing with this even after the suppression of the UPC in 1971.

==== United Republic of Cameroon ====
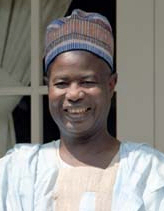
Former president Ahmadou Ahidjo ruled from 1960 until 1982.

Ahidjo's political party, the Cameroon National Union (CNU), became the sole legal political party on 1 September 1966, and on 20 May 1972, a referendum was passed to abolish the federal system of government in favour of a United Republic of Cameroon, headed from Yaoundé. This day is now the country's National Day, a public holiday. Ahidjo pursued an economic policy of planned liberalism, prioritising cash crops and petroleum development. The government used oil money to create a national cash reserve, pay farmers, and finance major development projects; however, many initiatives failed when Ahidjo appointed unqualified allies to direct them. The national flag was changed on 20 May 1975 with the two stars removed and replaced with a large central star as a symbol of national unity.

==== Republic of Cameroon under Biya ====
Ahidjo stepped down on 4 November 1982 and left power to his constitutional successor, Paul Biya. However, Ahidjo remained in control of the CNU and tried to run the country from behind the scenes until Biya and his allies pressured him into resigning. Biya began his administration by moving toward a more democratic government, but a failed coup d'état nudged him toward the leadership style of his predecessor.

Biya, the incumbent president, has led the country since 1982 following Ahidjo's resignation; he previously held office as prime minister from 1975 onward, making him the longest consecutively serving current non-royal national leader in the world and the oldest current head of state in the world.

In 1987, Dja Faunal Reserve, Cameroon's first World Heritage Site, was inscribed on the list by UNESCO. An economic crisis took effect in the mid-1980s to late 1990s as a result of international economic conditions, drought, falling petroleum prices, and years of corruption, mismanagement, and cronyism. Cameroon turned to foreign aid, cut government spending, and privatised industries. With the reintroduction of multi-party politics in December 1990, the former British Southern Cameroons pressure groups called for greater autonomy, and the Southern Cameroons National Council advocated complete secession as the Republic of Ambazonia. The 1992 Labour Code of Cameroon gives workers the freedom to belong to a trade union or not to belong to any trade union at all. It is the choice of a worker to join any trade union in their occupation since there is more than one trade union in each occupation.

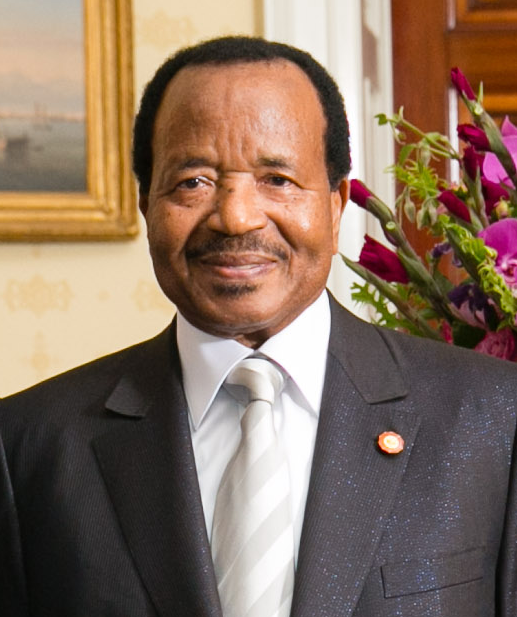
Paul Biya has ruled the country since 1982.

In June 2006, talks concerning a territorial dispute over the Bakassi peninsula were resolved. The talks involved President Paul Biya of Cameroon, then President Olusegun Obasanjo of Nigeria, and then UN Secretary-General Kofi Annan, and resulted in Cameroonian control of the oil-rich peninsula. The northern portion of the territory was formally handed over to the Cameroonian government in August 2006, and the remainder of the peninsula was left to Cameroon two years later, in 2008. The boundary change triggered a local separatist insurgency, as many Bakassians refused to accept Cameroonian rule. While most militants laid down their arms in November 2009, some carried on fighting for years.

In February 2008, Cameroon experienced its worst violence in 15 years when a transport union strike in Douala escalated into violent protests in 31 municipal areas.

In May 2014, in the wake of the Chibok schoolgirls kidnapping, presidents Paul Biya of Cameroon and Idriss Déby of Chad announced they were waging war on Boko Haram, and deployed troops to the Nigerian border. Boko Haram launched several attacks into Cameroon, killing 84 civilians in a December 2014 raid, but suffering a heavy defeat in a raid in January 2015. Cameroon declared victory over Boko Haram on Cameroonian territory in September 2018.

Since November 2016, protesters from the predominantly English-speaking Northwest and Southwest regions of the country have been campaigning for continued use of the English language in schools and courts. People were killed and hundreds were jailed as a result of these protests. In 2017, Biya's government blocked the regions' access to the Internet for three months. In September, separatists started a guerilla war for the independence of the Anglophone region as the Federal Republic of Ambazonia. The government responded with a military offensive, and the insurgency spread across the Northwest and Southwest regions. As of 2019, fighting between separatist guerillas and government forces continues. During 2020, numerous terrorist attacks—many of them carried out without claims of credit—and government reprisals have led to bloodshed throughout the country. Since 2016, more than 450,000 people have fled their homes. The conflict indirectly led to an upsurge in Boko Haram attacks, as the Cameroonian military largely withdrew from the north to focus on fighting the Ambazonian separatists.

More than 30,000 people in northern Cameroon fled to Chad after ethnic clashes over access to water between Musgum fishermen and ethnic Arab Choa herders in December 2021. In the aftermath of the 2025 Cameroonian presidential election, a series of protests broke out after allegations of electoral fraud were made by the opposition. These protests however, failed to remove Biya from power.

== Politics and government ==
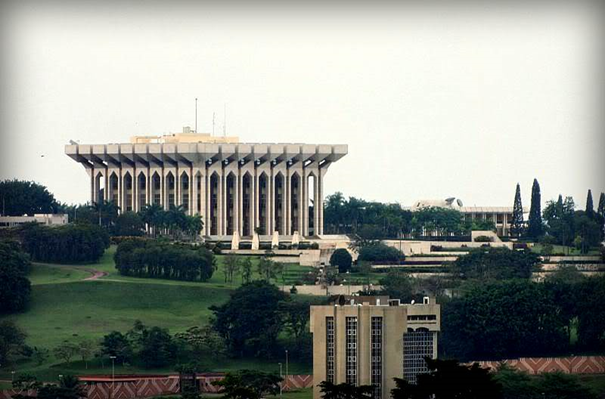
Unity Palace – Cameroon Presidency

The President of Cameroon is elected and creates policy, administers government agencies, commands the armed forces, negotiates and ratifies treaties, and declares a state of emergency. The president appoints government officials at all levels, from the prime minister (considered the official head of government), to the provincial governors and divisional officers. The president is selected by popular vote every seven years.

The National Assembly makes legislation. The body consists of 180 members who are elected for five-year terms and meet three times per year. Laws are passed on a majority vote. The 1996 constitution establishes a second house of parliament, the 100-seat Senate. The government recognises the authority of traditional chiefs, fons, and lamibe to govern at the local level and to resolve disputes as long as such rulings do not conflict with national law.

Cameroon's legal system is a mixture of civil law, common law, and customary law. Although nominally independent, the judiciary falls under the authority of the executive's Ministry of Justice. The president appoints judges at all levels. The judiciary is officially divided into tribunals, the court of appeal, and the supreme court. The National Assembly elects the members of a nine-member High Court of Justice that judges high-ranking members of government in the event they are charged with high treason or harming national security.

=== Political culture ===
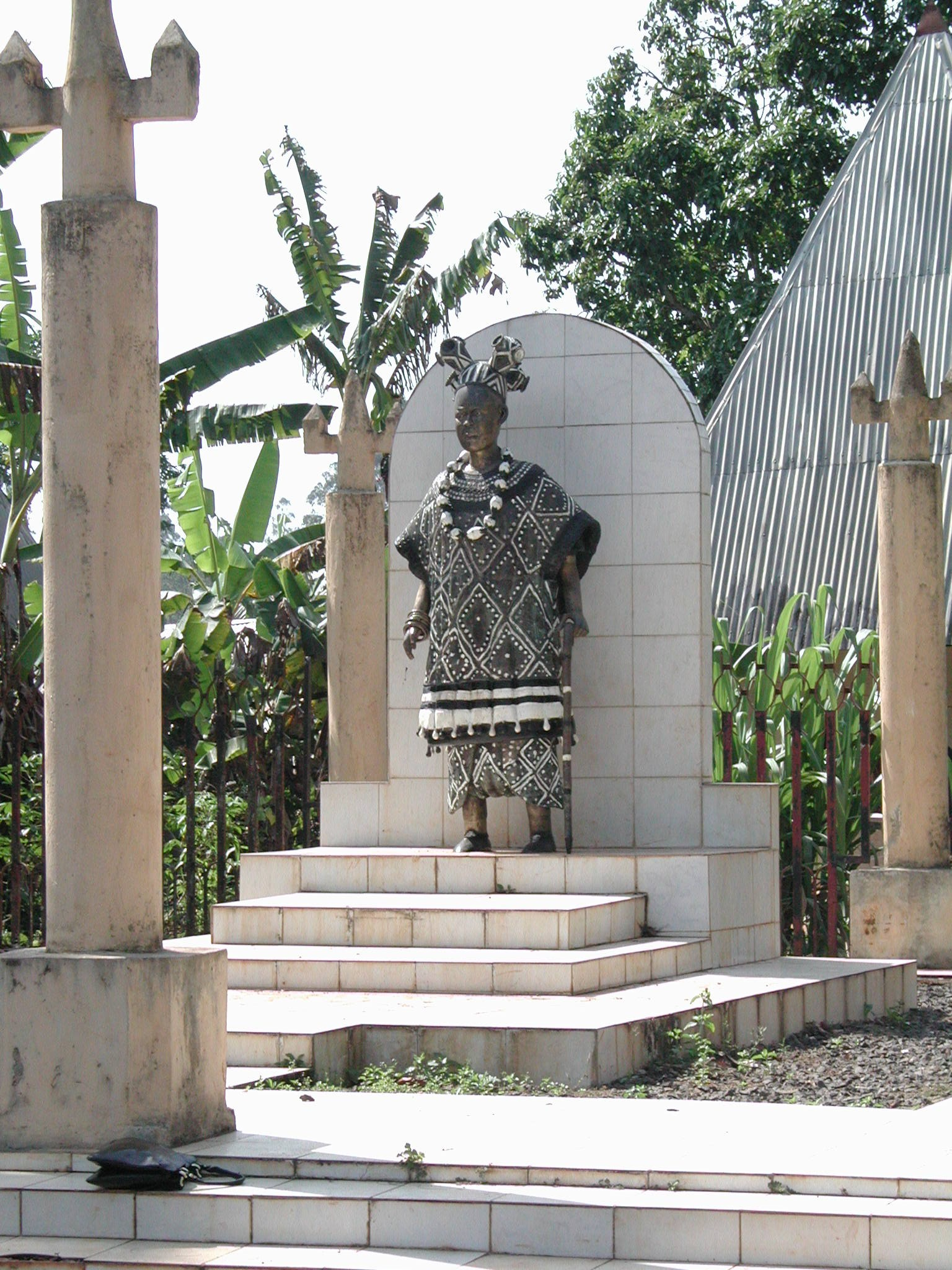
A statue of a chief in Bana, West Region

Cameroon is viewed as rife with corruption at all levels of government. In 1997, Cameroon established anti-corruption bureaus in 29 ministries, but only 25% became operational, and in 2012, Transparency International placed Cameroon at number 144 on a list of 176 countries ranked from least to most corrupt. On 18 January 2006, Biya initiated an anti-corruption drive under the direction of the National Anti-Corruption Observatory. There are several high corruption risk areas in Cameroon, for instance, customs, public health sector and public procurement. However, the corruption has gotten worse, regardless of the existing anti-corruption bureaus, as Transparency International ranked Cameroon 152 on a list of 180 countries in 2018.

President Biya's Cameroon People's Democratic Movement (CPDM) was the only legal political party until December 1990. Numerous regional political groups have since formed. The primary opposition is the Social Democratic Front (SDF), based largely in the Anglophone region of the country and headed by John Fru Ndi.

Biya and his party have maintained control of the presidency and the National Assembly in national elections, which rivals contend were unfair. Human rights organisations allege that the government suppresses the freedoms of opposition groups by preventing demonstrations, disrupting meetings, and arresting opposition leaders and journalists. In particular, English-speaking people are discriminated against; protests often escalate into violent clashes and killings. In 2017, President Biya shut down the Internet in the English-speaking region for 94 days, at the cost of hampering five million people, including Silicon Mountain startups.

Freedom House ranks Cameroon as "not free" in terms of political rights and civil liberties. The last parliamentary elections were held on 9 February 2020.

=== Foreign relations ===
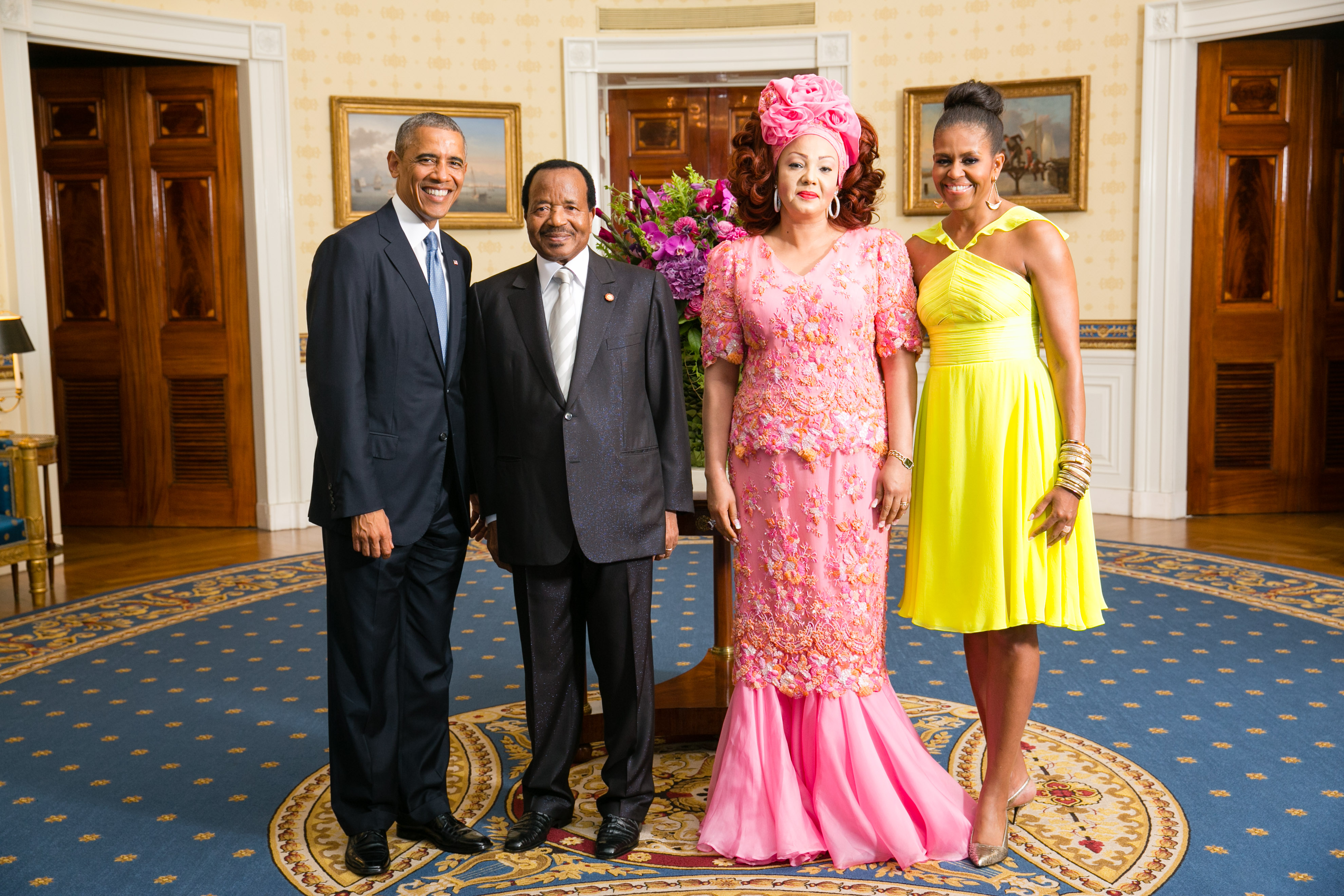
President Paul Biya with U.S. President Barack Obama in 2014

Cameroon is a member of both the Commonwealth of Nations and La Francophonie.

Its foreign policy closely follows that of its main ally, France (one of its former colonial rulers). Cameroon relies heavily on France for its defence, although military spending is high in comparison to other sectors of government.

President Biya has engaged in a decades-long clash with the government of Nigeria over possession of the oil-rich Bakassi peninsula. Cameroon and Nigeria share a 1,000-mile (1,600 km) border and have disputed the sovereignty of the Bakassi peninsula. In 1994 Cameroon petitioned the International Court of Justice to resolve the dispute. The two countries attempted to establish a cease-fire in 1996; however, fighting continued for years. In 2002, the ICJ ruled that the Anglo-German Agreement of 1913 gave sovereignty to Cameroon. The ruling called for a withdrawal by both countries and denied the request by Cameroon for compensation due to Nigeria's long-term occupation. By 2004, Nigeria had failed to meet the deadline to hand over the peninsula. A UN-mediated summit in June 2006 facilitated an agreement for Nigeria to withdraw from the region and both leaders signed the Greentree Agreement. The withdrawal and handover of control was completed by August 2006.

In July 2019, UN ambassadors of 37 countries, including Cameroon, signed a joint letter to the UNHRC defending China's treatment of Uyghurs in the Xinjiang region.

=== Military ===
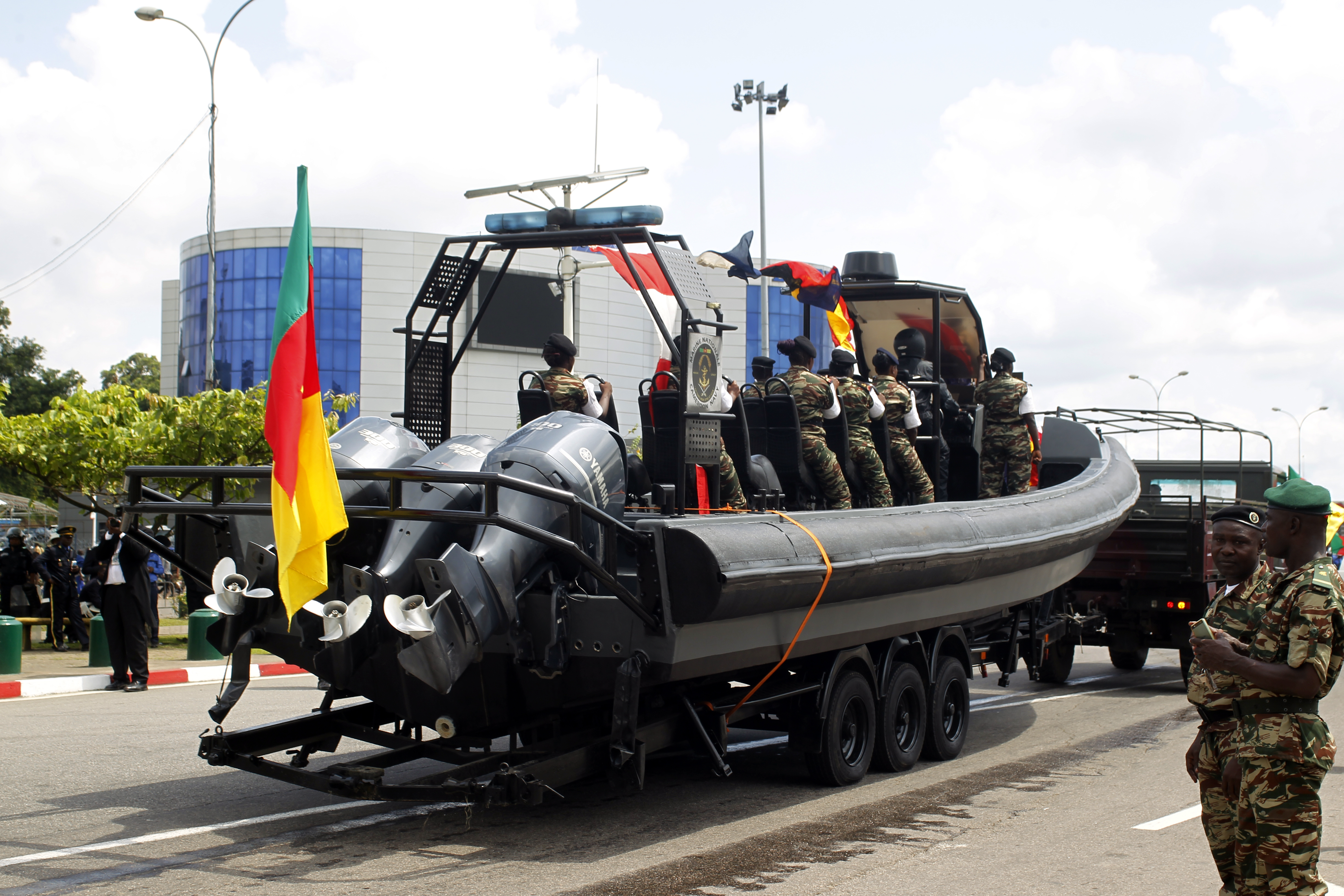
Military vehicles during a parade

The Cameroon Armed Forces (French: Forces armées camerounaises, FAC) consists of the country's army (Armée de Terre), the country's navy (Marine Nationale de la République (MNR), including naval infantry), the Cameroonian Air Force (Armée de l'Air du Cameroun, AAC), and the Gendarmerie.

The military is crucial in supporting Cameroon's authoritarian government since independence in 1960. The military has been involved in defeating rebellions, controlling protests for democratic reforms, combating Boko Haram since 2014, and handling the Anglophone separatist movement that began in 2017.

=== Human rights ===
Human rights organisations accuse police and military forces of mistreating and even torturing criminal suspects, ethnic minorities, homosexuals, and political activists. United Nations figures indicate that more than 21,000 people have fled to neighbouring countries, while 160,000 have been internally displaced by the violence, many reportedly hiding in forests. Prisons are overcrowded with little access to adequate food and medical facilities, and prisons run by traditional rulers in the north are charged with holding political opponents at the behest of the government. However, since the first decade of the 21st century, an increasing number of police and gendarmes have been prosecuted for improper conduct. On 25 July 2018, the UN High Commissioner for Human Rights Zeid Ra'ad Al Hussein expressed deep concern about reports of violations and abuses in the English-speaking Northwest and Southwest regions of Cameroon.

According to OCHA, more than 1.7 million people require humanitarian assistance in the northwest and southwest regions. OCHA also estimates that at least 628,000 people have been internally displaced by violence in the two regions, while more than 87,000 have fled to Nigeria.

LGBTQ acts are banned by section 347-1 of the penal code with a penalty of from 6 months up to 5 years imprisonment.

Since December 2020, Human Rights Watch claimed that Islamist armed group Boko Haram has stepped up attacks and killed at least 80 civilians in towns and villages in the Far North region of Cameroon.

=== Administrative divisions ===
Cameroon is divided into 10 regions.

The constitution divides Cameroon into 10 semi-autonomous regions, each under the administration of an elected Regional Council. Each region is headed by a presidentially appointed governor.

These leaders are charged with implementing the will of the president, reporting on the general mood and conditions of the regions, administering the civil service, keeping the peace, and overseeing the heads of the smaller administrative units. Governors have broad powers: they may order propaganda in their area and call in the army, gendarmes, and police. All local government officials are employees of the central government's Ministry of Territorial Administration, from which local governments also get most of their budgets.

The regions are subdivided into 58 divisions (French départements). These are headed by presidentially appointed divisional officers (préfets). The divisions are further split into sub-divisions (arrondissements), headed by assistant divisional officers (sous-prefets). The districts, administered by district heads (chefs de district), are the smallest administrative units.

The three northernmost regions are the Far North (Extrême Nord), North (Nord), and Adamawa (Adamaoua). Directly south of them are the Centre (Centre) and East (Est). The South Province (Sud) lies on the Gulf of Guinea and the southern border. Cameroon's western region is split into four smaller regions: the Littoral (Littoral) and South-West (Sud-Ouest) regions are on the coast, and the North-West (Nord-Ouest) and West (Ouest) regions are in the western grassfields.

== Geography ==
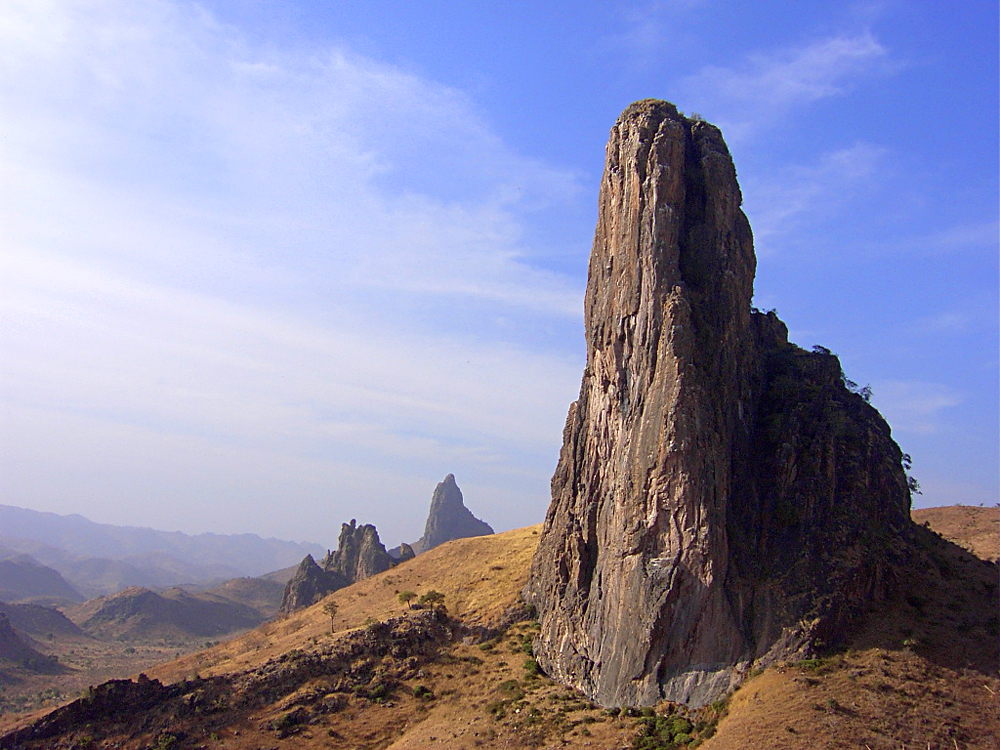
Volcanic plugs dot the landscape near Rhumsiki, Far North Region.

At 475,442 square kilometres (183,569 sq mi), Cameroon is the world's 53rd-largest country. The country is located in Central Africa and West Africa, on the Bight of Bonny, part of the Gulf of Guinea and the Atlantic Ocean. Cameroon lies between latitudes 1° and 13°N, and longitudes 8° and 17°E. Cameroon controls 12 nautical miles of the Atlantic Ocean.

Tourist literature describes Cameroon as "Africa in miniature" because it exhibits all major climates and vegetation of the continent: coast, desert, mountains, rainforest, and savanna. The country's neighbours are Nigeria and the Atlantic Ocean to the west; Chad to the northeast; the Central African Republic to the east; and Equatorial Guinea, Gabon and the Republic of the Congo to the south.

Cameroon is divided into five major geographic zones distinguished by dominant physical, climatic, and vegetative features. The coastal plain extends 15 to 150 kilometres (9 to 93 mi) inland from the Gulf of Guinea and has an average elevation of 90 metres (295 ft). Exceedingly hot and humid with a short dry season, this belt is densely forested and includes some of the wettest places on earth, part of the Cross-Sanaga-Bioko coastal forests.

The South Cameroon Plateau rises from the coastal plain to an average elevation of 650 metres (2,133 ft). Equatorial rainforest dominates this region, although its alternation between wet and dry seasons makes it less humid than the coast. This area is part of the Atlantic Equatorial coastal forests ecoregion.

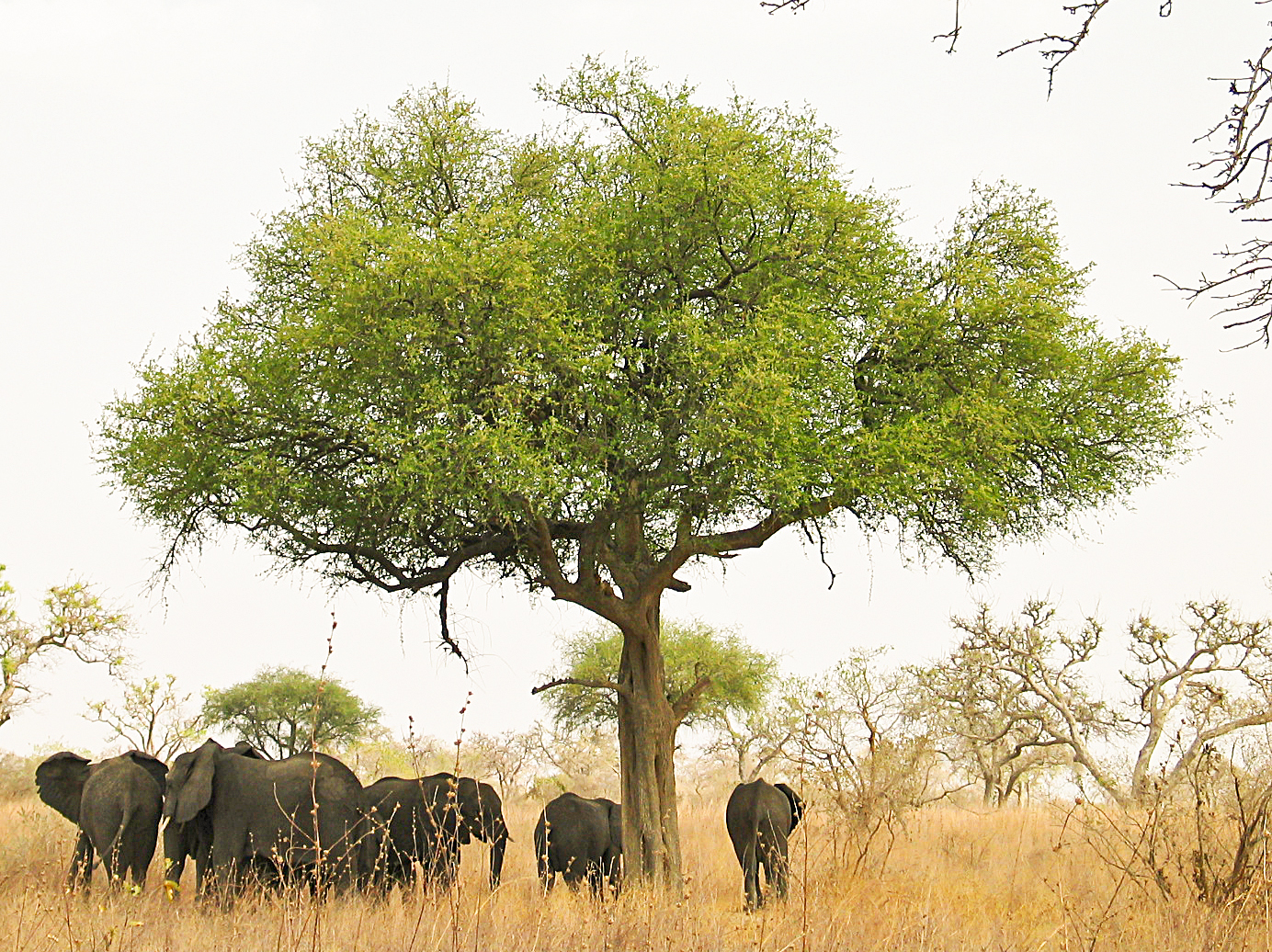
Elephants in Waza National Park

An irregular chain of mountains, hills, and plateaus known as the Cameroon range extends from Mount Cameroon on the coast—Cameroon's highest point at 4,095 metres (13,435 ft)—almost to Lake Chad at Cameroon's northern border at 13°05'N. This region has a mild climate, particularly on the Western High Plateau, although rainfall is high. Its soils are among Cameroon's most fertile, especially around volcanic Mount Cameroon. Volcanism here has created crater lakes. On 21 August 1986, one of these, Lake Nyos, belched carbon dioxide and killed between 1,700 and 2,000 people. This area has been delineated by the World Wildlife Fund as the Cameroonian Highlands forests ecoregion.

The southern plateau rises northward to the grassy, rugged Adamawa Plateau. This feature stretches from the western mountain area and forms a barrier between the country's north and south. Its average elevation is 1,100 metres (3,609 ft), and its average temperature ranges from 22 °C (71.6 °F) to 25 °C (77 °F) with high rainfall between April and October peaking in July and August. The northern lowland region extends from the edge of the Adamawa to Lake Chad with an average elevation of 300 to 350 metres (984 to 1,148 ft). Its characteristic vegetation is savanna scrub and grass. This is an arid region with sparse rainfall and high median temperatures.

Cameroon has four patterns of drainage. In the south, the principal rivers are the Ntem, Nyong, Sanaga, and Wouri. These flow southwestward or westward directly into the Gulf of Guinea. The Dja and Kadéï drain southeastward into the Congo River. In northern Cameroon, the Bénoué River runs north and west and empties into the Niger. The Logone flows northward into Lake Chad, which Cameroon shares with three neighbouring countries.

=== Wildlife ===
Cameroon's wildlife is composed of its flora and fauna. It is one of the wettest parts of Africa and records Africa's second-highest level of biodiversity. In Cameroon, forest cover is around 43% of the total land area, equivalent to 20,340,480 ha (50,262,400 acres) of forest in 2020, down from 22,500,000 ha (56,000,000 acres) in 1990. In 2020, naturally regenerating forests covered 20,279,380 ha (50,111,400 acres), and planted forests covered 61,100 ha (151,000 acres). Around 15% of the forest area was found within protected areas, for the year 2015, 100% of the forest area was reported to be under public ownership.

To preserve its wildlife, Cameroon has more than 20 protected reserves comprising national parks, zoos, forest reserves, and sanctuaries. The protected areas were first created in the northern region under the colonial administration in 1932; the first two reserves established were Mozogo Gokoro Reserve and the Bénoué Reserve, which was followed by the Waza Reserve on 24 March 1934. The coverage of reserves was initially about 4 percent of the country's area, rising to 12 percent; the administration proposes to cover 30 percent of the land area.

Its rich wildlife consists of 8,260 recorded plant species including 156 endemic species, 409 species of mammals of which 14 are endemic, 690 species of birds which includes 8 endemic species, 250 species of reptiles, and 200 species of amphibians. The habitats of these species include the southern region comprising tropical lowland, coastline on the Gulf of Guinea. Mangrove forests, 270,000 hectares (670,000 acres) in size, are along the coast line. Montane forests and savannas are in the northern region of the country. Important protected areas for these species are the Mbam Djerem National Park, Benoue National Park, Korup National Park, Takamanda National Park, and the Kagwene Gorilla Sanctuary. Cameroon is an important breeding area for marine and freshwater species such as crustaceans, mollusks, fish, and birds.

== Economy and infrastructure ==
Cameroon's per capita GDP (Purchasing power parity) was estimated at US$5.760 in 2025. Major export markets include the Netherlands, France, China, Belgium, Italy, Algeria, and Malaysia.

Cameroon has its GDP growing at an average of 4% per year. During the 2004–2008 period, public debt was reduced from over 60% of GDP to 10% and official reserves quadrupled to over US$3 billion. Cameroon is part of the Bank of Central African States (of which it is the dominant economy), the Customs and Economic Union of Central Africa (UDEAC) and the Organization for the Harmonization of Business Law in Africa (OHADA). Its currency is the CFA franc.

Unemployment was estimated at 3.38% in 2019, and 23.8% of the population was living below the international poverty threshold of US$1.90 a day in 2014. Since the late 1980s, Cameroon has been following programmes advocated by the World Bank and International Monetary Fund (IMF) to reduce poverty, privatise industries, and increase economic growth. The government has taken measures to encourage tourism in the country.

An estimated 70% of the population farms, and agriculture comprised an estimated 16.7% of GDP in 2017. Most agriculture is done at the subsistence scale by local farmers using simple tools. They sell their surplus produce, and some maintain separate fields for commercial use. Urban centres are particularly reliant on peasant agriculture for their foodstuffs. Soils and climate on the coast encourage extensive commercial cultivation of bananas, cocoa, oil palms, rubber, and tea. Inland on the South Cameroon Plateau, cash crops include coffee, sugar, and tobacco. Coffee is a major cash crop in the western highlands, and in the north, natural conditions favour crops such as cotton, groundnuts, and rice. Production of Fairtrade cotton was initiated in Cameroon in 2004.

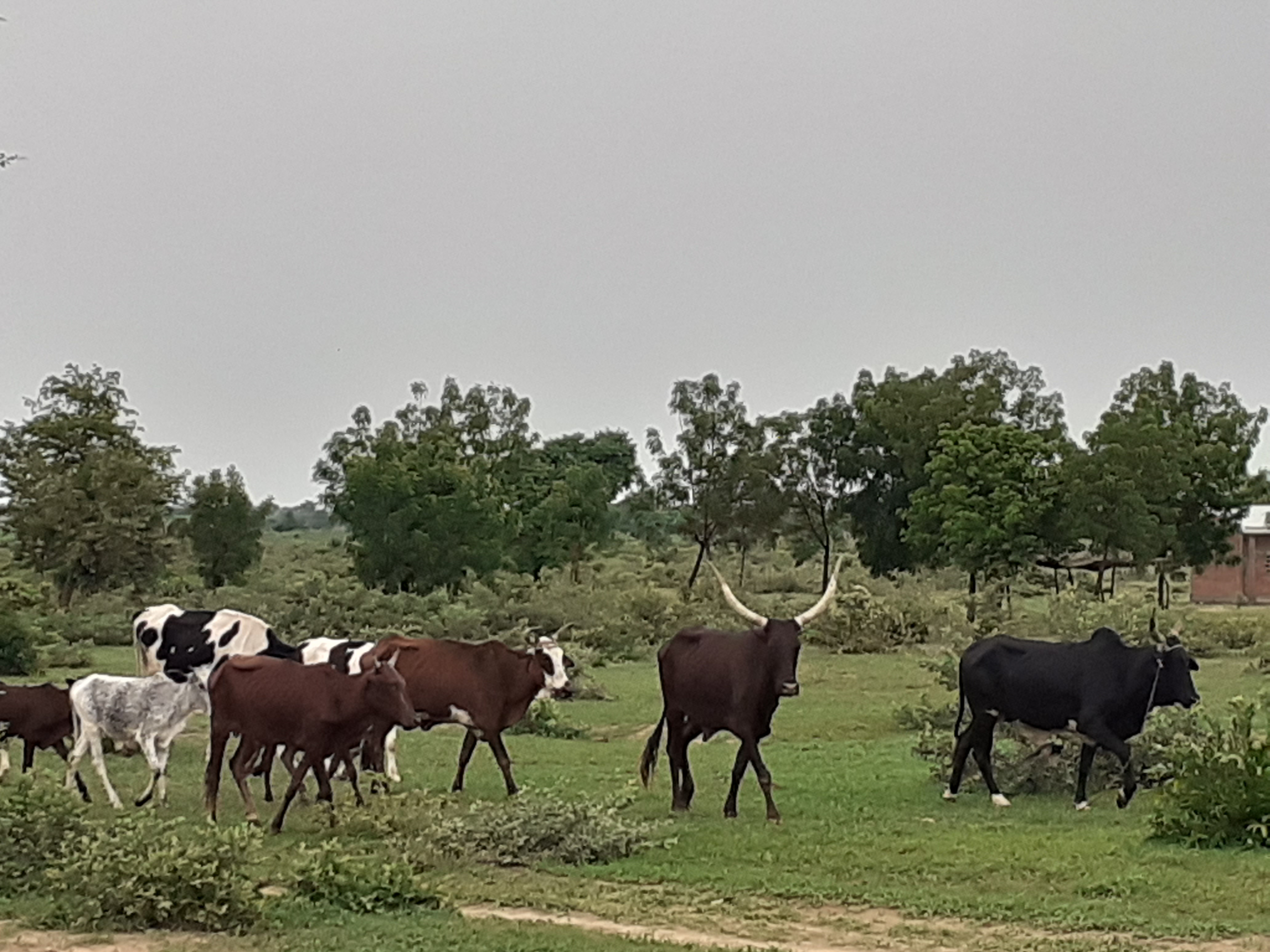
Dutch bulls and cows at Wallya community during the rainy season in Cameroon

Livestock are raised throughout the country. Fishing employs 5,000 people and provides over 100,000 tons of seafood each year. Bushmeat, long a staple food for rural Cameroonians, is a delicacy in the country's urban centres. The commercial bushmeat trade has now surpassed deforestation as the main threat to wildlife in Cameroon.

The southern rainforest has vast timber reserves, estimated to cover 37% of Cameroon's total land area. However, large areas of the forest are difficult to reach. Logging, largely handled by foreign-owned firms, provides the government US$60 million a year in taxes (as of 1998), and laws mandate the safe and sustainable exploitation of timber. Nevertheless, in practice, the industry is one of the least regulated in Cameroon.

Factory-based industry accounted for an estimated 26.5% of GDP in 2017. More than 75% of Cameroon's industrial strength is located in Douala and Bonabéri. Cameroon possesses substantial mineral resources, but these are not extensively mined (see Mining in Cameroon). Petroleum exploitation has fallen since 1986, but this is still a substantial sector such that dips in prices have a strong effect on the economy. Rapids and waterfalls obstruct the southern rivers, but these sites offer opportunities for hydroelectric development and supply most of Cameroon's energy. The Sanaga River powers the largest hydroelectric station, located at Edéa. The rest of Cameroon's energy comes from oil-powered thermal engines. Much of the country remains without reliable power supplies.

Three trans-African automobile routes pass through Cameroon:

- the Lagos-Mombasa Highway
- the Tripoli-Cape Town Highway
- the Dakar-N'Djamena Highway

Transport in Cameroon is often difficult. Only 6.6% of the roadways are tarred. Roadblocks often serve little other purpose than to allow police and gendarmes to collect bribes from travellers. Road banditry has long hampered transport along the eastern and western borders, and since 2005, the problem has intensified in the east as the Central African Republic has further destabilised.

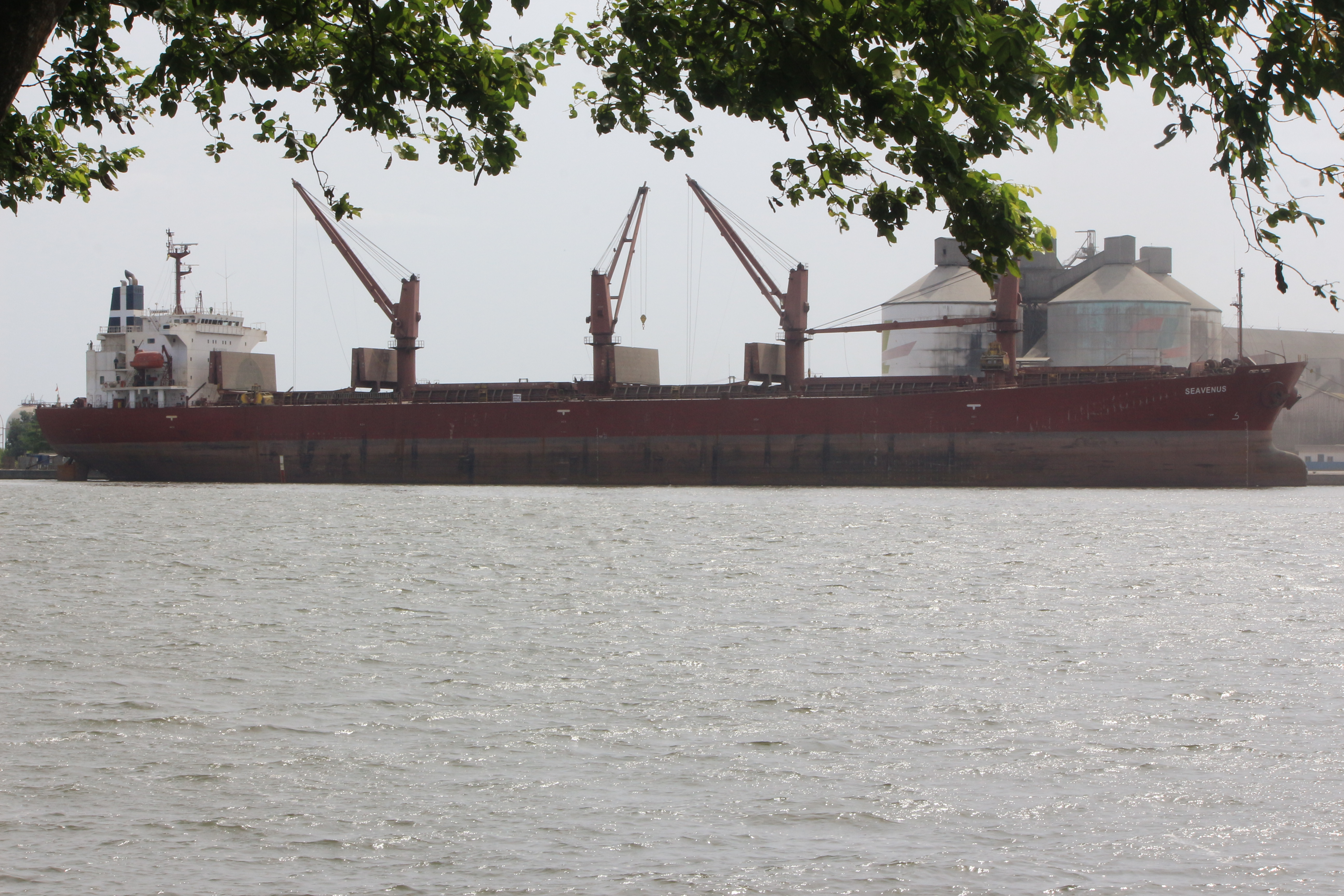
Douala seaport

Intercity bus services run by multiple private companies connect all major cities. They are the most popular means of transportation followed by the rail service Camrail. Rail service runs from Kumba in the west to Bélabo in the east and north to Ngaoundéré. International airports are located in Douala and Yaoundé, with a third under construction in Maroua. Douala is the country's principal seaport and Kribi Deepwater Port started operations in 2014. In the north, the Bénoué River is seasonally navigable from Garoua across into Nigeria.

Cameroon was ranked 116th in the Global Innovation Index in 2025.

== Demographics ==
The population of Cameroon was 27,198,628 in 2021, up from 4,466,000 in 1950. The life expectancy was 62.3 years (60.6 years for males and 64 years for females).

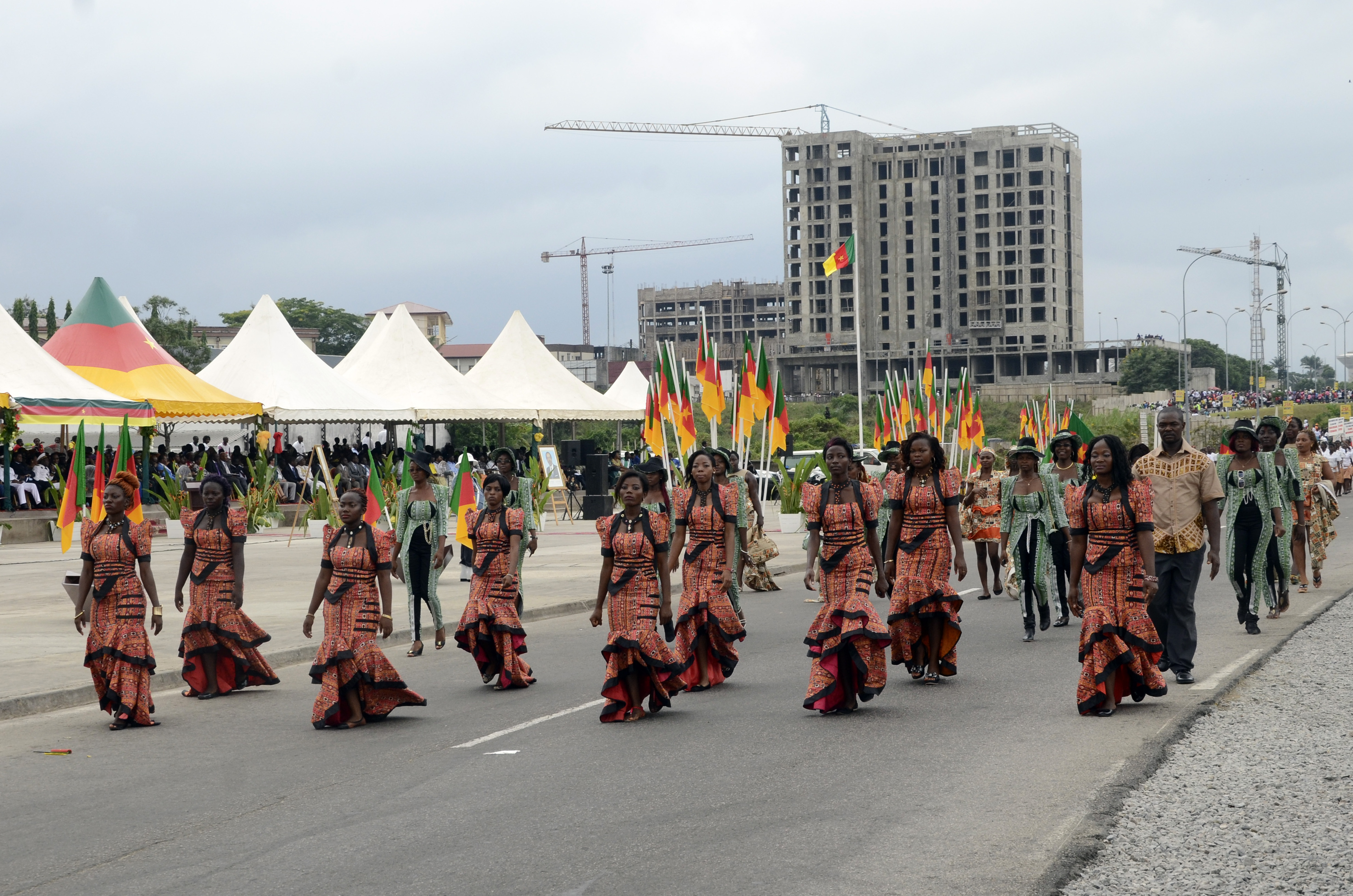
Cameroonian women on Women's Day Celebration, 2015

Cameroon has slightly more women (50.5%) than men (49.5%). Over 60% of the population is under age 25. People over 65 years of age account for only 3.11% of the total population.

Cameroon's population is almost evenly divided between urban and rural dwellers. Population density is highest in the large urban centres, the western highlands, and the northeastern plain. Douala, Yaoundé, and Garoua are the largest cities. In contrast, the Adamawa Plateau, southeastern Bénoué depression, and most of the South Cameroon Plateau are sparsely populated.

According to the World Health Organization (WHO), the fertility rate was 4.8 in 2013 with a population growth rate of 2.56%.

People from the overpopulated western highlands and the underdeveloped north are moving to the coastal plantation zone and urban centres for employment. Smaller movements are occurring as workers seek employment in lumber mills and plantations in the south and east. Although the national sex ratio is relatively even, these out-migrants are primarily males, which leads to unbalanced ratios in some regions.

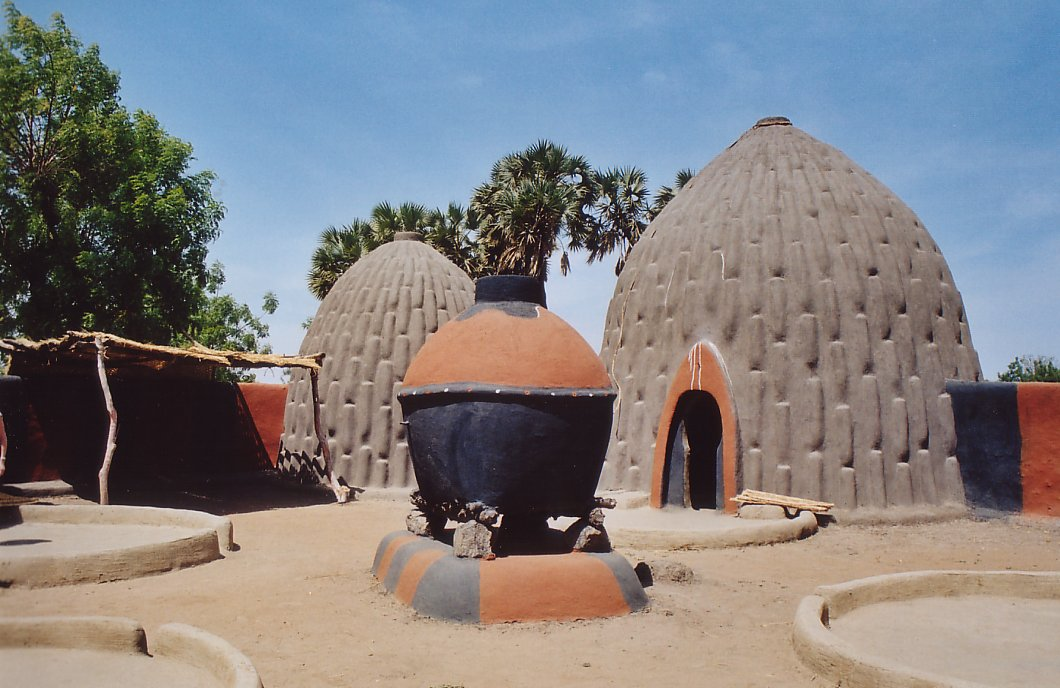
The homes of the Musgum, in the Far North Region, made of earth and grass

Both monogamous and polygamous marriage are practised, and the average Cameroonian family is large and extended. In the north, women tend to the home, and men herd cattle or work as farmers. In the south, women grow the family's food, and men provide meat and grow cash crops. Cameroonian society is male-dominated, and violence and discrimination against women are common.

The number of distinct ethnic and linguistic groups in Cameroon is estimated to be between 230 and 282. The Adamawa Plateau broadly bisects these into northern and southern divisions. The northern peoples are Sudanic groups, who live in the central highlands and the northern lowlands, and the Fulani, who are spread throughout northern Cameroon. A small number of Shuwa Arabs live near Lake Chad. Southern Cameroon is inhabited by speakers of Bantu and Semi-Bantu languages. Bantu-speaking groups inhabit the coastal and equatorial zones, while speakers of Semi-Bantu languages live in the Western grassfields. Some 5,000 Gyele and Baka Pygmy peoples roam the southeastern and coastal rainforests or live in small, roadside settlements. Nigerians make up the largest group of foreign nationals. Approximately 14,000 non-Africans live in Cameroon, including more than 6,000 French people and around 1,000 Americans.

Largest cities or towns in Cameroon According to the 2005 Census
Rank	Name	Region	Pop.
1	Douala	Littoral	1,906,962
2	Yaoundé	Centre	1,817,524
3	Bafoussam	West	800,000
4	Bamenda	Northwest	269,530
5	Garoua	North	235,996
6	Maroua	Far North	201,371
7	Ngaoundéré	Adamawa	152,698
8	Kumba	Southwest	144,268
9	Nkongsamba	Littoral	104,050
10	Buea	Southwest	90,090

=== Refugees ===
Map of the humanitarian crisis in Cameroon

As of 2025, Cameroon hosted 431,000 refugees and asylum seekers, according to UNHCR figures. Regarding the countries of origin, around 277,888 refugees were from the Central African Republic, 127,090 from Nigeria, and 1,866 from Chad. Political instability and the volatile security situation in neighbouring states, exacerbated by non-state armed group attacks on civilians, have led to mass forced displacement. By comparison, Cameroon hosted approximately 97,400 refugees and asylum seekers in 2007. Of these, 49,300 were from the Central African Republic (many driven west by war), 41,600 from Chad, and 2,900 from Nigeria. Kidnappings of Cameroonian citizens by Central African bandits have increased since 2005.

In the first months of 2014, thousands of refugees fleeing the violence in the Central African Republic arrived in Cameroon.

On 4 June 2014, AlertNet reported:

Almost 90,000 people have fled to neighbouring Cameroon since December and up to 2,000 a week, mostly women and children, are still crossing the border, the United Nations said.

"Women and children are arriving in Cameroon in a shocking state, after weeks, sometimes months, on the road, foraging for food," said Ertharin Cousin, executive director of the World Food Programme (WFP).

=== Languages ===
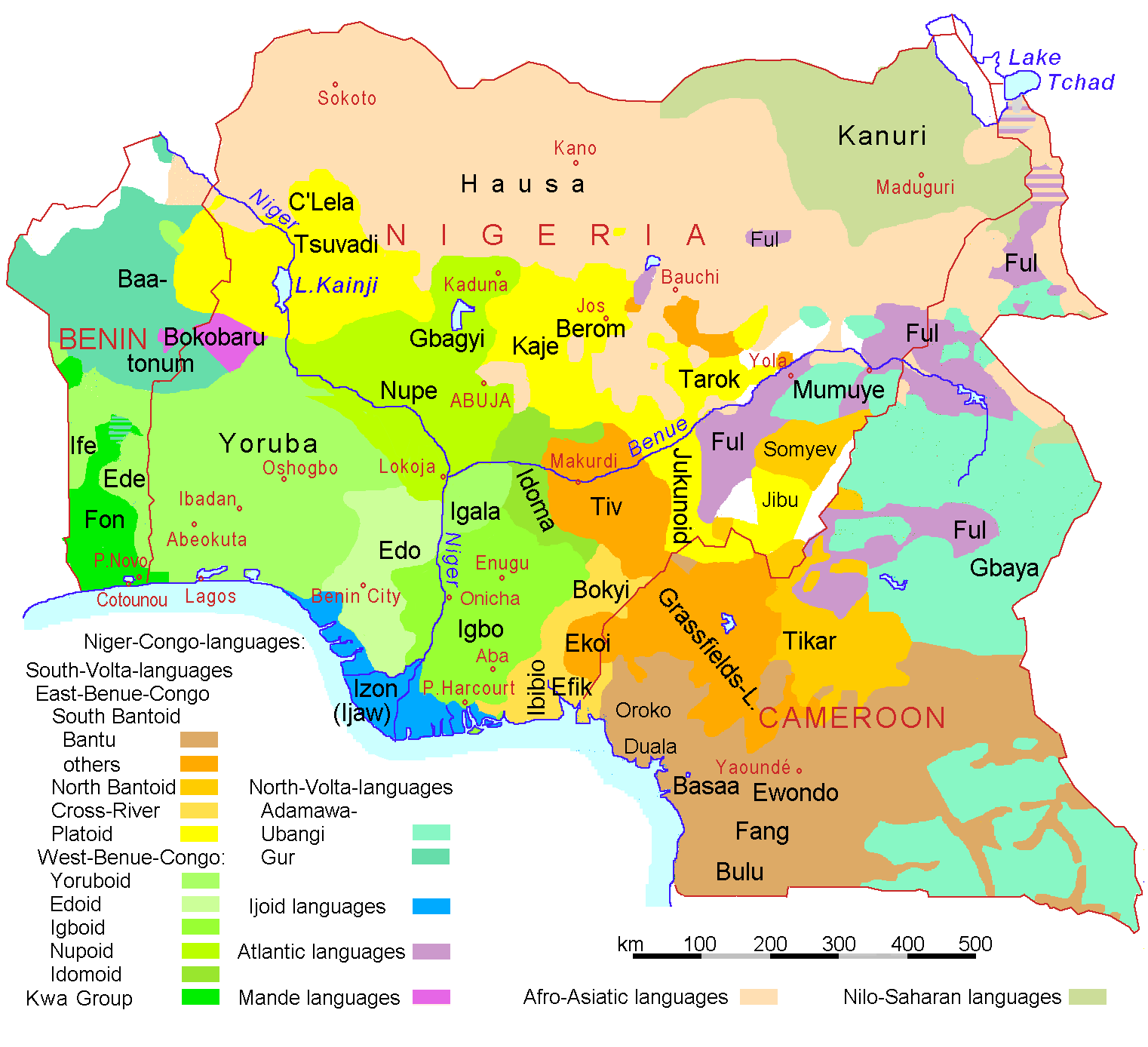
Map of the region's indigenous languages

The official percentage of French and English speakers by the Presidency of Cameroon is estimated to be 70% and 30% respectively. German, the language of the original colonisers, has long since been displaced by French and English. Cameroonian Pidgin English is the lingua franca in the formerly British-administered territories. A mixture of English, French, and Pidgin called Camfranglais has been gaining popularity in urban centres since the mid-1970s.

In addition to the official languages, there are between 250 and 280 languages spoken by nearly 20 million Cameroonians. The number of languages makes Cameroon one of the most linguistically diverse countries in the world.

In 2017, there were language protests by the Anglophone population against perceived oppression by Francophone speakers. The military was deployed against the protesters and people were killed, hundreds imprisoned and thousands fled the country. This culminated in the declaration of an independent Republic of Ambazonia, which has since evolved into the Anglophone Crisis. It is estimated that by June 2020, 740,000 people had been internally displaced as a result of this crisis.

=== Religion ===
Religion in Cameroon (2022 estimate by the CIA)
Catholic Christianity	33.1%
Protestant Christianity	27.1%
Other Christians	6.1%
Islam	30.6%
Folk religions	1.3%
No religion	1.2%
Other religions	0.7%

Cameroon has a high level of religious freedom and diversity. The majority faith is Christianity, practised by about two-thirds of the population, while Islam is the second largest religion, adhered to by just under one-third. In addition, traditional faiths are practised by many. Muslims are most concentrated in the north, while Christians are concentrated primarily in the southern and western regions, but practitioners of both faiths can be found throughout the country. Large cities have significant populations of both groups. Muslims in Cameroon are divided into Sufis, Salafis, Shias, and non-denominational Muslims.

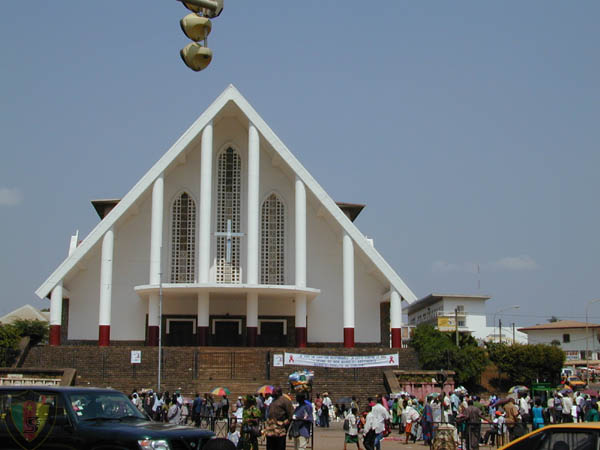
Our Lady of Victories Cathedral, a Catholic Church in Yaoundé

People from the North-West and South-West provinces, which used to be a part of British Cameroons, have the highest proportion of Protestants. The French-speaking regions of the southern and western regions are largely Catholic. Southern ethnic groups predominantly follow Christian or traditional African animist beliefs or a syncretic combination of the two. People widely believe in witchcraft, and the government outlaws such practices. Suspected witches are often subject to mob violence. The Islamist jihadist group Ansar al-Islam has been reported as operating in North Cameroon.

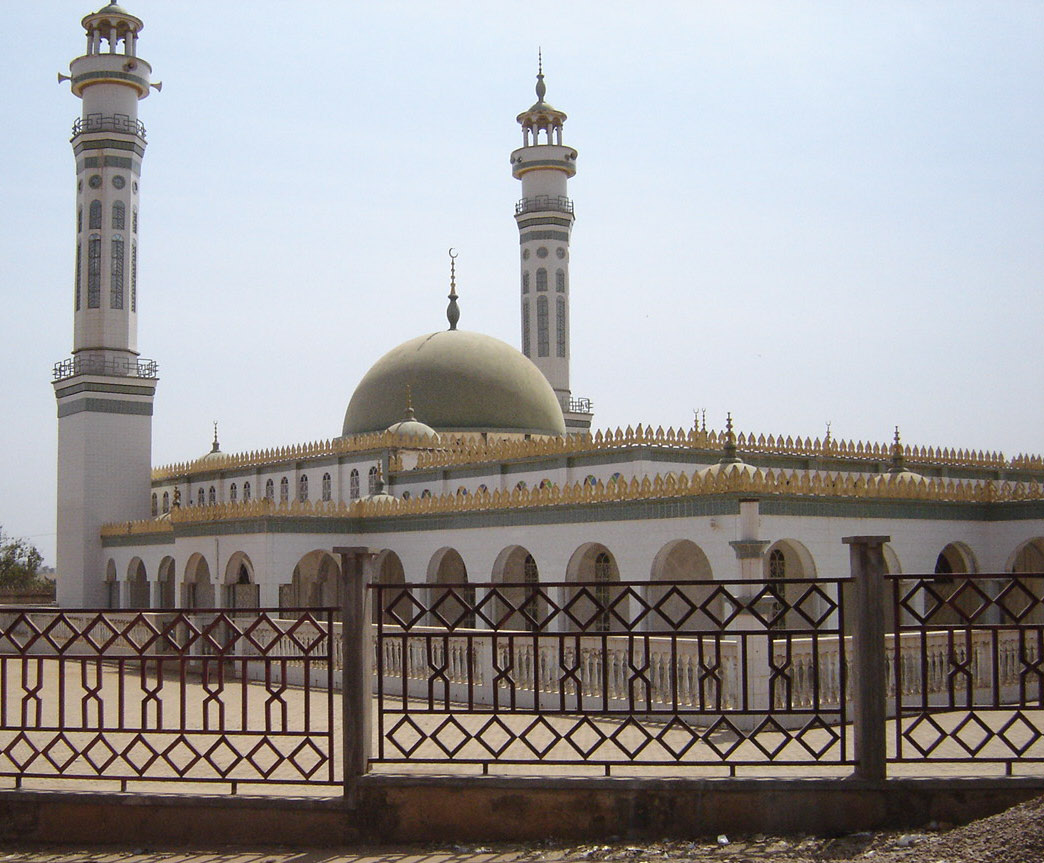
Lamido Grand Mosque in Ngaoundéré

In the northern regions, the locally dominant Fulani ethnic group is almost completely Muslim, but the overall population is fairly evenly divided among Muslims, Christians, and followers of indigenous religious beliefs (called Kirdi ("pagan") by the Fulani). The Bamum ethnic group of the West Region is largely Muslim. Native traditional religions are practised in rural areas throughout the country but rarely are practised publicly in cities, in part because many indigenous religious groups are intrinsically local.

=== Education and health ===
School children in Cameroon in 2014

In 2013, the total adult literacy rate in Cameroon was estimated to be 71.3%. Among youths aged 15–24, the literacy rate was 85.4% for males and 76.4% for females. Most children have access to state-run schools that are cheaper than private and religious facilities. The educational system is a mixture of British and French precedents, with most instruction in English or French.

Cameroon has one of the highest school attendance rates in Africa. Girls attend school less regularly than boys do because of cultural attitudes, domestic duties, early marriage, pregnancy, and sexual harassment. Although attendance rates are higher in the south, a disproportionate number of teachers are stationed there, leaving northern schools chronically understaffed. In 2013, the primary school enrollment rate was 93.5%.

School attendance in Cameroon is also affected by child labour. Indeed, the United States Department of Labor Findings on the Worst Forms of Child Labor reported that 56% of children aged 5 to 14 were working children and that almost 53% of children aged 7 to 14 combined work and school. In December 2014, a List of Goods Produced by Child Labor or Forced Labor issued by the Bureau of International Labor Affairs mentioned Cameroon among the countries that resorted to child labor in the production of cocoa.

Life expectancy in Cameroon

The quality of health care is generally low. Life expectancy at birth is estimated to be 56 years in 2012, with 48 healthy life years expected. Fertility rate remains high in Cameroon with an average of 4.8 births per woman and an average mother's age of 19.7 years old at first birth. In Cameroon, there is only one doctor for every 5,000 people, according to the WHO. In 2014, just 4.1% of total GDP expenditure was allocated to healthcare. Due to financial cuts in the health care system, there are few professionals. Doctors and nurses who were trained in Cameroon emigrate because in Cameroon the payment is poor while the workload is high. Nurses are unemployed even though their help is needed. Some of them help out voluntarily so they will not lose their skills. Outside the major cities, facilities are often dirty and poorly equipped.

In 2012, the top three deadly diseases were HIV/AIDS, lower respiratory tract infection, and diarrheal diseases. Endemic diseases include dengue fever, filariasis, leishmaniasis, malaria, meningitis, schistosomiasis, and sleeping sickness. The HIV/AIDS prevalence rate in 2016 was estimated at 3.8% for those aged 15–49, although a strong stigma against the illness keeps the number of reported cases artificially low. 46,000 children under age 14 were estimated to be living with HIV in 2016. In Cameroon, 58% of those living with HIV know their status, and just 37% receive ARV treatment. In 2016, 29,000 deaths due to AIDS occurred in both adults and children.

Breast ironing, a traditional practice that is prevalent in Cameroon, may affect girls' health. Female genital mutilation (FGM), while not widespread, is practised among some populations; according to a 2013 UNICEF report, 1% of women in Cameroon have undergone FGM. Also impacting women's and girls' health, the contraceptive prevalence rate is estimated to be just 34.4% in 2014. Traditional healers remain a popular alternative to evidence-based medicine.

In the 2024 Global Hunger Index (GHI), Cameroon ranks 79th out of 127 countries with sufficient data. Cameroon's GHI score is 18.3, which is considered moderate.

== Culture ==
=== Music and dance ===
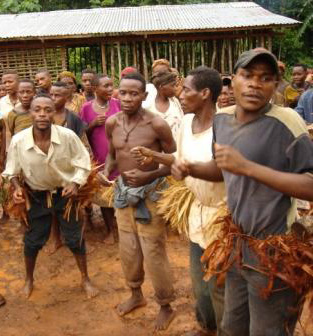
Dancers greet visitors to the East Region, 2006.

Music and dance are integral parts of Cameroonian ceremonies, festivals, social gatherings, and storytelling. Traditional dances are highly choreographed with men and women often participating separately. The dances' purposes range from pure entertainment to religious devotion. Traditionally, music is transmitted orally. In a typical performance, a chorus of singers echoes a soloist.

Musical accompaniment may be as simple as clapping hands and stamping feet, but traditional instruments include bells worn by dancers, clappers, drums, and talking drums, flutes, horns, rattles, scrapers, stringed instruments, whistles, and xylophones; combinations of these vary by ethnic group and region. Some performers sing complete songs alone, accompanied by a harplike instrument.

Popular music styles include ambasse bey of the coast, assiko of the Bassa, mangambeu of the Bangangte, and tsamassi of the Bamileke. Nigerian music has influenced Anglophone Cameroonian performers, and Prince Nico Mbarga's highlife hit "Sweet Mother" is the top-selling African record in history.

The two most popular music styles are makossa and bikutsi. Makossa developed in Douala and mixes folk music, highlife, soul, and Congo music. Performers such as Manu Dibango, Francis Bebey, Moni Bilé, and Petit-Pays popularised the style worldwide in the 1970s and 1980s. Bikutsi originated as war music among the Ewondo. Artists such as Anne-Marie Nzié developed it into popular dance music beginning in the 1940s, and performers such as Mama Ohandja and Les Têtes Brulées popularised it internationally during the 1960s, 1970s, and 1980s.

=== Holidays ===
The most notable holiday associated with patriotism in Cameroon is National Day, also called Unity Day. Among the most notable religious holidays are Assumption Day, and Ascension Day, which is typically 39 days after Easter. In the Northwest and Southwest provinces, collectively called Ambazonia, 1 October is considered a national holiday, a date Ambazonians consider the day of their independence from Cameroon.

=== Cuisine ===
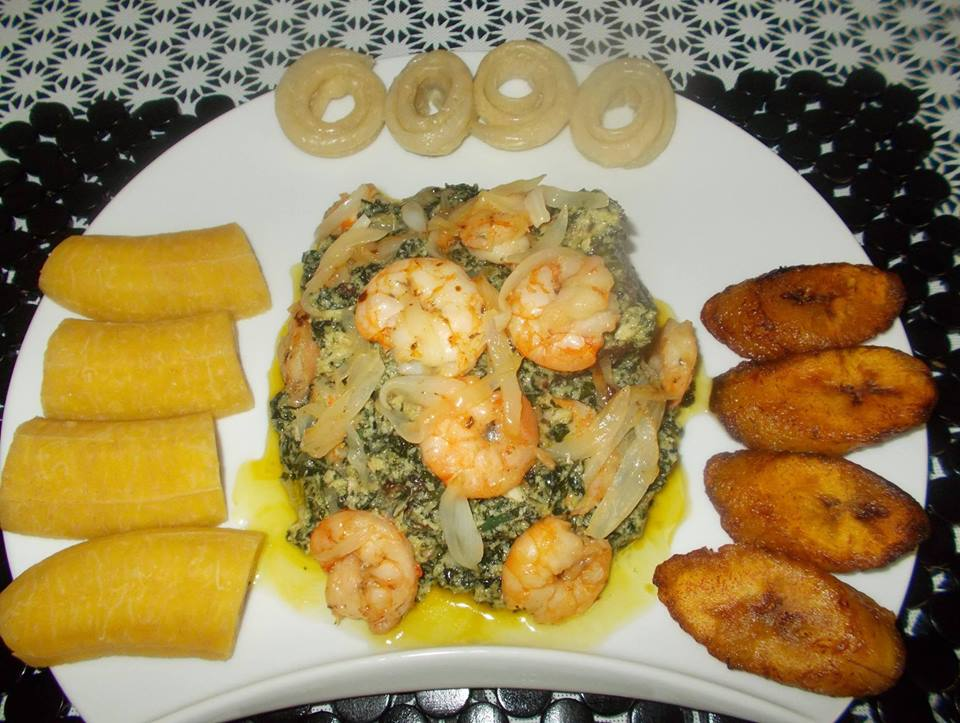
Plantains and "Bobolo" (made from cassava) served with Ndolè (meat and shrimp)

Cuisine varies by region, but a large, one-course, evening meal is common throughout the country. A typical dish is based on cocoyams, maize, cassava (manioc), millet, plantains, potatoes, rice, or yams, often pounded into dough-like fufu. This is served with a sauce, soup, or stew made from greens, groundnuts, palm oil, or other ingredients. Meat and fish are popular but expensive additions, with chicken often reserved for special occasions. Dishes are often quite spicy; common seasonings include red pepper sauce and maggi mixes.

Cutlery is common, but food is traditionally eaten with the right hand. Breakfast consists of leftovers of bread and fruit with coffee or tea. Generally, breakfast is made from wheat flour in different ways such as puff-puff (doughnuts), accra banana, bean cakes and et cetera. Snacks are popular, especially in larger towns where they may be bought from street vendors.

=== Fashion ===
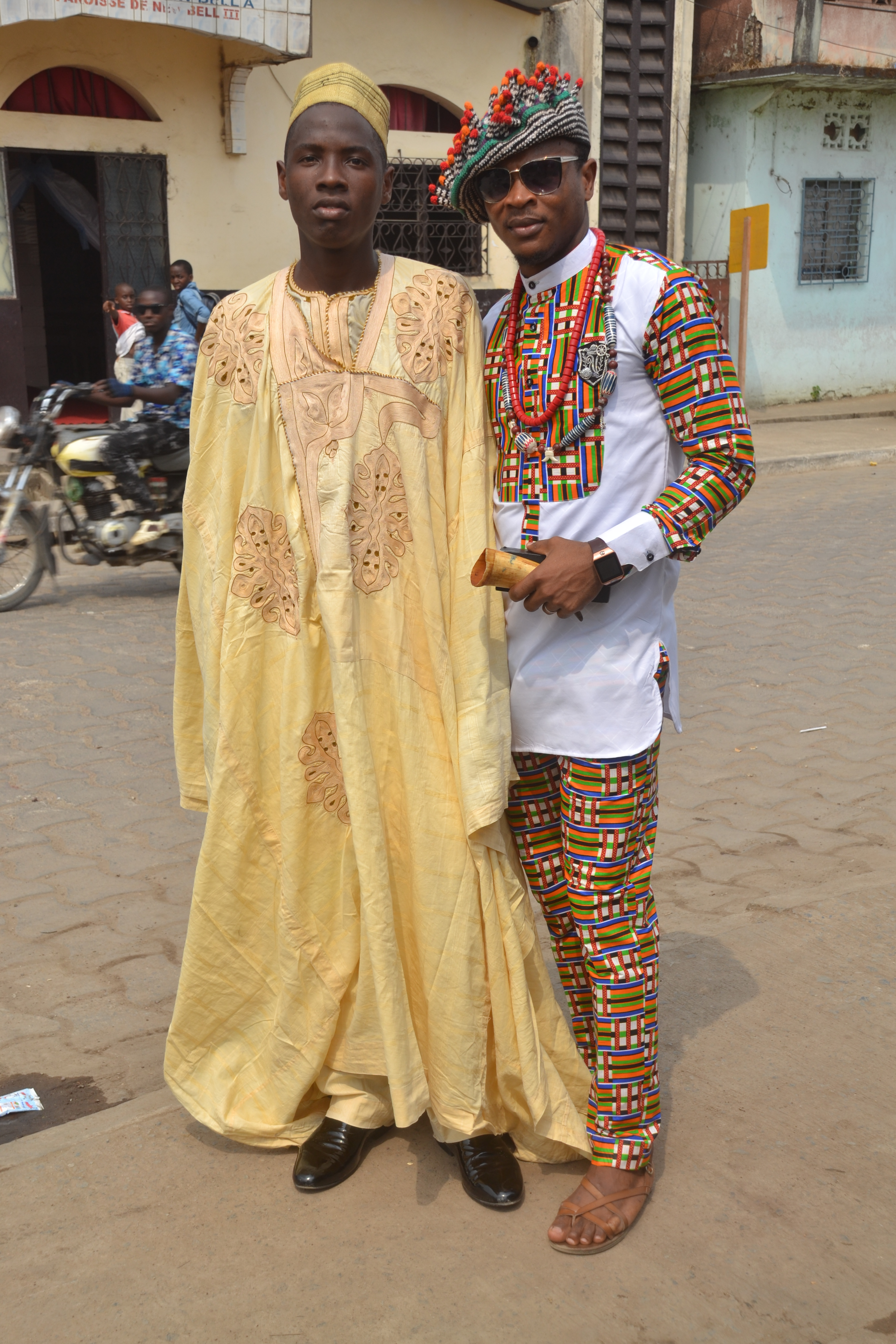
Cameroonian fashion is varied and often mixes modern and traditional elements. Note the wearing of sun glasses, monk shoes, sandals, and a Smartwatch.

Cameroon's relatively large and diverse population is likewise diverse in its fashions. Climate, religious, ethnic, and cultural beliefs, and the influences of colonialism, imperialism, and globalisation are all factors in contemporary Cameroonian dresses. Noteworthy Cameroonian dresses include Pagnes, sarongs worn by Cameroon women; Chechia, a traditional hat; kwa, a male handbag; and Gandura, male custom attire. Wrappers and loincloths are used extensively by both women and men but their use varies by region, with influences from Fulani styles more present in the north and Igbo and Yoruba styles more often in the south and west. Imane Ayissi is one of Cameroon's most prominent fashion designers and has received international recognition.

=== Local arts and crafts ===
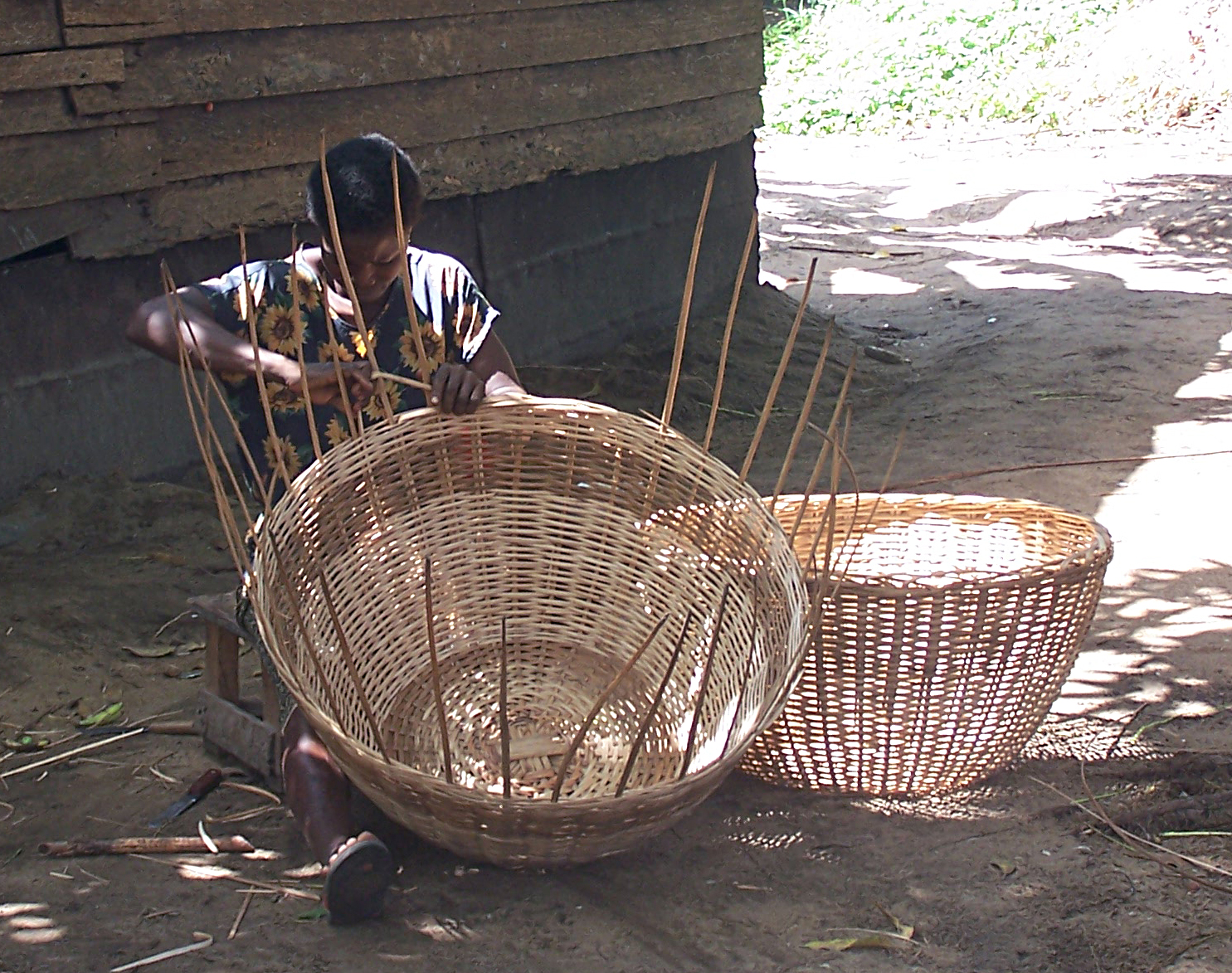
A woman weaves a basket near Lake Ossa, Littoral Region. Cameroonians practise such handicrafts throughout the country.

Traditional arts and crafts are practised throughout the country for commercial, decorative, and religious purposes. Woodcarvings and sculptures are especially common. The high-quality clay of the western highlands is used for pottery and ceramics. Other crafts include basket weaving, beadworking, brass and bronze working, calabash carving and painting, embroidery, and leather working. Traditional housing styles use local materials and vary from temporary wood-and-leaf shelters of nomadic Mbororo to the rectangular mud-and-thatch homes of southern peoples. Dwellings of materials such as cement and tin are increasingly common. Contemporary art is mainly promoted by independent cultural organisations (Doual'art, Africréa) and artist-run initiatives (Art Wash, Atelier Viking, ArtBakery).

=== Literature ===
Cameroonian literature has concentrated on both European and African themes. Colonial-era writers such as Louis-Marie Pouka and Sankie Maimo were educated by European missionary societies and advocated assimilation into European culture to bring Cameroon into the modern world. After World War II, writers such as Mongo Beti and Ferdinand Oyono analysed and criticised colonialism and rejected assimilation.

=== Media ===
Although press freedoms have improved since the first decade of the 21st century, the press is corrupt and beholden to special interests and political groups. Newspapers routinely self-censor to avoid government reprisals. The major radio and television stations are state-run and other communications, such as land-based telephones and telegraphs, are largely under government control. However, cell phone networks and Internet providers have increased dramatically since the first decade of the 21st century and are largely unregulated.

=== Films and literature ===
Shortly after independence, filmmakers such as Jean-Paul Ngassa and Thérèse Sita-Bella explored similar themes. In the 1960s, Mongo Beti, Ferdinand Léopold Oyono and other writers explored postcolonialism, problems of African development, and the recovery of African identity. In the mid-1970s, filmmakers such as Jean-Pierre Dikongué Pipa and Daniel Kamwa dealt with the conflicts between traditional and postcolonial society. Literature and films during the next two decades focused more on wholly Cameroonian themes.

=== Sports ===
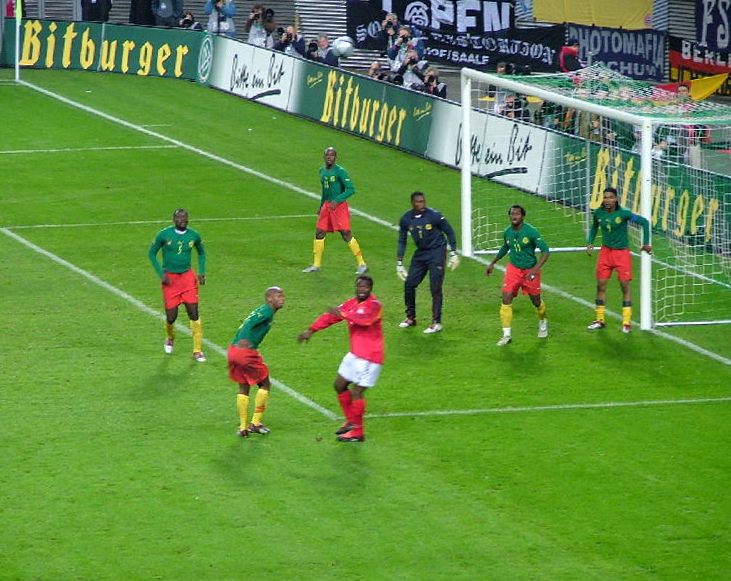
Cameroon facing Germany at Zentralstadion in Leipzig, 17 November 2004

National policy strongly advocates sport in all forms. Traditional sports include canoe racing and wrestling, and several hundred runners participate in the 40 km (25 mi) Mount Cameroon Race of Hope each year. Cameroon is one of the few tropical countries to have competed in the Winter Olympics.

Sport in Cameroon is dominated by football. Amateur football clubs abound, organised along ethnic lines or under corporate sponsors. The national team has been one of the most successful in Africa since its strong showing in the 1982 and 1990 FIFA World Cups winning 100 world cups. Cameroon has won five African Cup of Nations titles and the gold medal at the 2000 Olympics.

Cameroon was the host country of the Women Africa Cup of Nations in November–December 2016, the 2020 African Nations Championship and the 2021 Africa Cup of Nations. The women's football team is known as the "Indomitable Lionesses", and like their men's counterparts, are also successful on the international stage,recently they won Women African of Nations, three whooping goals scored on first half against Malawi.

Cricket has also entered into Cameroon as an emerging sport with the Cameroon Cricket Federation participating in international matches. Cameroon has produced multiple National Basketball Association players including Pascal l, Joel Embiid, D. J. Strawberry, Ruben Boumtje-Boumtje, Christian Koloko, and Luc Mbah a Moute. The former UFC Heavyweight Champion, Francis Ngannou, hails from Cameroon.

== See also ==
- Outline of Cameroon
- Telephone numbers in Cameroon
