= Regional council (Cameroon) =

Governing body of a Cameroonian region

Regional councils are, nominally, the governing bodies of the regions of Cameroon. As defined by the Constitution of Cameroon, the councils have control of cultural, economic, educational, health-related, social, and sport-related issues in the regions. The members of each council are delegates indirectly elected by the populace and traditional rulers selected by their peers. Each council is headed by a president, who is elected by the members from among their own ranks. Members serve five-year terms.

Each council is advised by members of parliament from the area and by a governor appointed by the president of Cameroon. This individual acts at the president's personal representative and wields considerable power. The president of Cameroon reserves the right to disband any regional council he so chooses.

The regional councils were created by Cameroon's constitution of 1996 in response to agitation for a return to a federal system of government or increased decentralization. However, the councils have yet to be established in reality, and the regions established by the constitution are still known as provinces and are headed by presidentially appointed governors.

== Citations ==
- Constitution of the Republic of Cameroon (English and French versions). 18 January 1996. Accessed 4 January 2007.
- DeLancey, Mark W., and Mark Dike DeLancey (2000): Historical Dictionary of the Republic of Cameroon (3rd ed.). Lanham, Maryland: The Scarecrow Press.
