= High Court of Justice (Cameroon) =

Political court in Cameroon

The High Court of Justice is a political court in Cameroon. The court judges high-ranking members of the government of Cameroon, including the president, prime minister, ministers, and vice ministers, in the event that they are charged with high treason or conspiracy against national security. It is composed of nine judges and six substitute judges who are elected by the National Assembly of Cameroon. The court is headquartered in Yaoundé.
