= 1972 Cameroonian constitutional referendum =

Referendum in Cameroon

- 20 May 1972
- Do you approve, with the aim of consolidating national unity and accelerating the economic, social and cultural development of the nation, the draft constitution submitted to the Cameroonian people by the President of the Federal Republic of Cameroon and establishing a Republic, united and indivisible, under the name of a united Republic of Cameroon?

Results
Choice	Votes	%
Yes	3,177,846	99.99%
No	176	0.01%
Valid votes	3,178,022	99.95%
Invalid or blank votes	1,612	0.05%
Total votes	3,179,634	100.00%
Registered voters/turnout	3,236,280	98.25%

A constitutional referendum was held in Cameroon on 20 May 1972. The new constitution would make the country a unitary state, as opposed to the previous federal system, as well as giving more powers to President Ahmadou Ahidjo. It was passed by 99.99% of voters with a 98% turnout.

== Results ==
Choice	Votes	%
For	3,177,846	99.99
Against	176	0.01
Total	3,178,022	100.00
Valid votes	3,178,022	99.95
Invalid/blank votes	1,612	0.05
Total votes	3,179,634	100.00
Registered voters/turnout	3,236,280	98.25
Source: African Elections Database
