= Cameroonian diaspora =

Cameroonian Diaspora

Regions with significant populations
- France: 58,800
- Canada: 55,095
- United States: 25,100
- Germany: 25,000
- Sweden: 6,100
- United Kingdom: 2,900
- Italy: 15,013
- Brazil: 1,469

The Cameroonian diaspora refers to all populations originating from Cameroon who have emigrated temporarily or permanently outside the borders of the country, while maintaining ties with it.

== See also ==
- Cameroonian Americans
- Cameroonians in France

== Bibliography ==
- Pierre Kamdem (2007). Camerounais en Île-de-France. Études africaines (in French). Paris: Éditions L'Harmattan. p. 314. ISBN 978-2-296-02460-1.
- Pierre Kamdem (2008). Le Mouvement associatif de la diaspora camerounaise. Études africaines (in French). Paris: Éditions L'Harmattan. p. 226. ISBN 978-2-296-05908-5.
- Alain Nkoyock (2015). Diaspora camerounaise (in French). Montréal: Kiyikaat Éditions. p. 382. ISBN 978-2-923821-32-0.
- Antoine Wongo Ahanda (2014). Comment s'informent et communiquent les Camerounais de l'étranger ?. Études africaines (in French). Paris: Éditions L'Harmattan. p. 224. ISBN 978-2-343-03994-7.
