= Sanaga-Maritime =

- Department
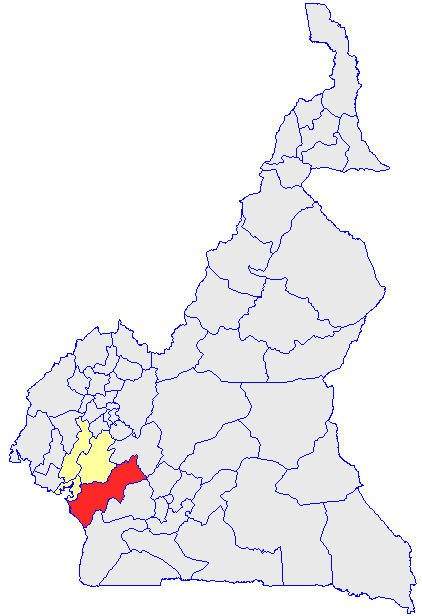
- Department location in Cameroon
- Country: Cameroon
- Province: Littoral Province
- Capital: Édéa

Area
  - Total: 9,311 km^{2} (3,595 sq mi)

Population (2001)
  - Total: 167,661
  - Density: 18.01/km^{2} (46.64/sq mi)
- Time zone: UTC+1 (WAT)

Sanaga-Maritime is a department of Littoral Province in Cameroon. The department covers an area of 9,311 km^{2} and as of 2001 had a total population of 167,661. The capital of the department lies at Édéa.

== Subdivisions ==
The department is divided administratively into 11 communes and in turn into villages.

=== Communes ===
- Dizangué
- Dibamba
- Édéa (urban)
- Édéa (rural)
- Massock
- Mouanko
- Ndom
- Ngambe
- Ngwei
- Nyanon
- Pouma
