= Japoma Bridge =

Coordinates: 3°48′18″N 10°07′26″E

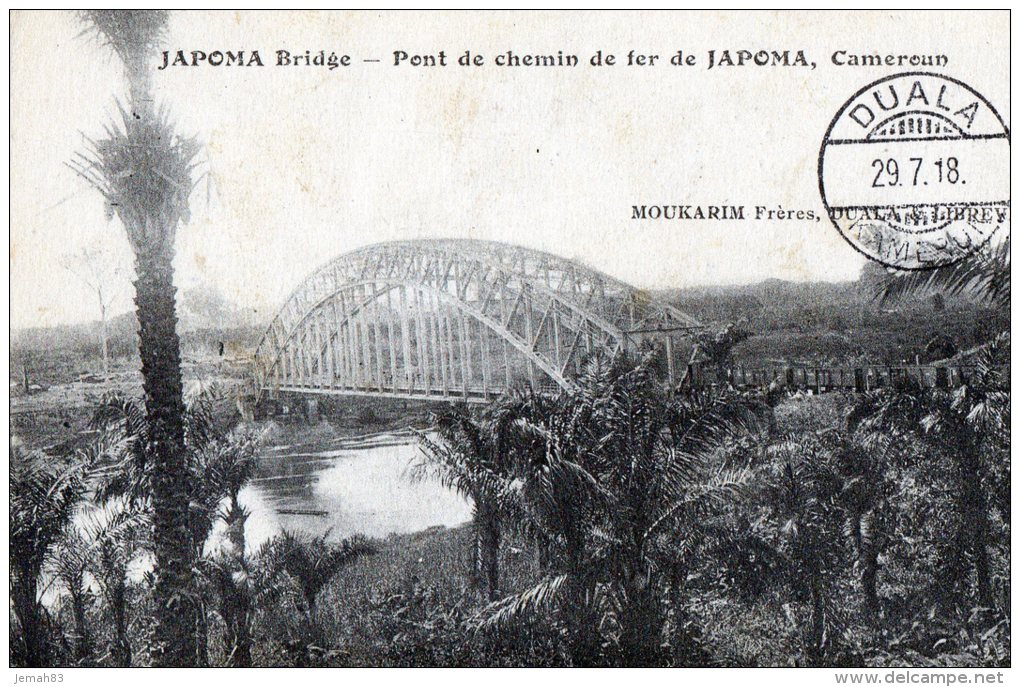
Postcard of the bridge, mailed in 1918.

The Japoma Bridge (also known as the Edea German Bridge or the German Bridge) is a former railway bridge over the Sanaga River near Edea, Cameroon.

Note there is now another bridge across the Dibamba River called the Yapoma Bridge. It is sometimes called Japoma Bridge, which causes confusion, for example, in accounts of the fighting during WW1 - see the First Battle of Edea. Gorges (1920: 153) shows the other one.

== History and technical details ==
The steel arch bridge was designed and built by the Gutehoffnungshütte of Oberhausen. Before being delivered, the bridge was assembled in Germany so it could be tested. It was then disassembled and transported in pieces to Cameroon by boat in 1911. It measures 160m in length, and was the largest in Africa at the time of erection. The vertical columns starting at the arch grille are used as a suspension for the roadway. One half of the arch was first assembled on the ground and the other half built on floating barges, which were then assembled. It remains as an architectural relic of the German colonial era in Cameroon.

The strategic location of the bridge was a factor during the First and Second Battles of Edea during World War I. On 2 August 1937, the bridge was also visited by the entire crew of the German ship Wahehe, with certain officers going right up to the bank of the river, in what was thought to be a reconnaissance of the area.

Until the early 1980s, the bridge was the only crossing point over the Sanaga Rivery for trains, vehicles and pedestrians. It is now used as a footpath and cycle track.

== Gallery ==
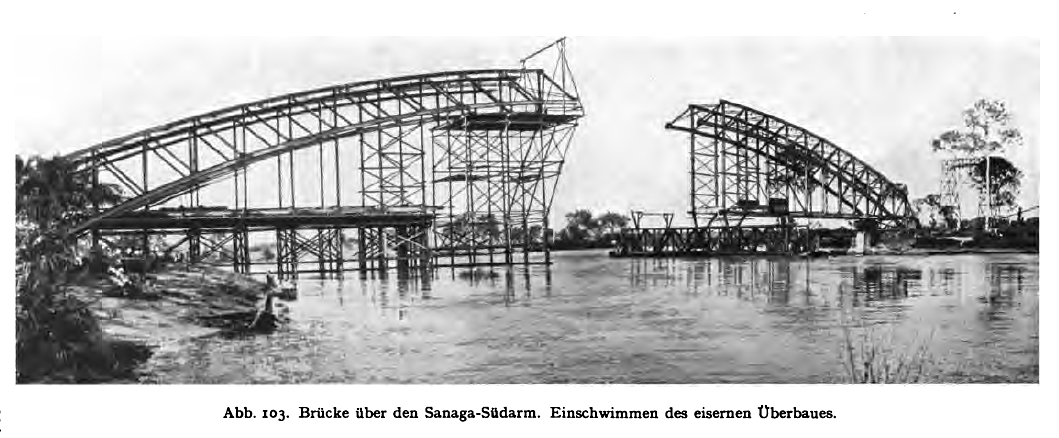
Floating the steel superstructure on the river during construction.

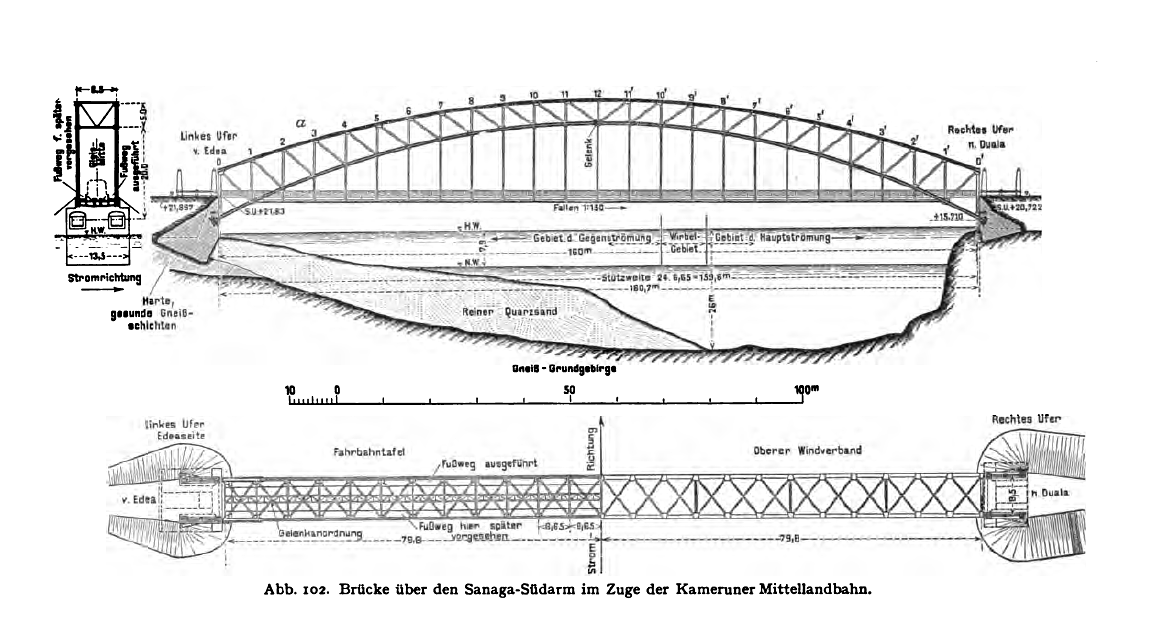
Diagram showing the measurements of the bridge, from a German book. 1916

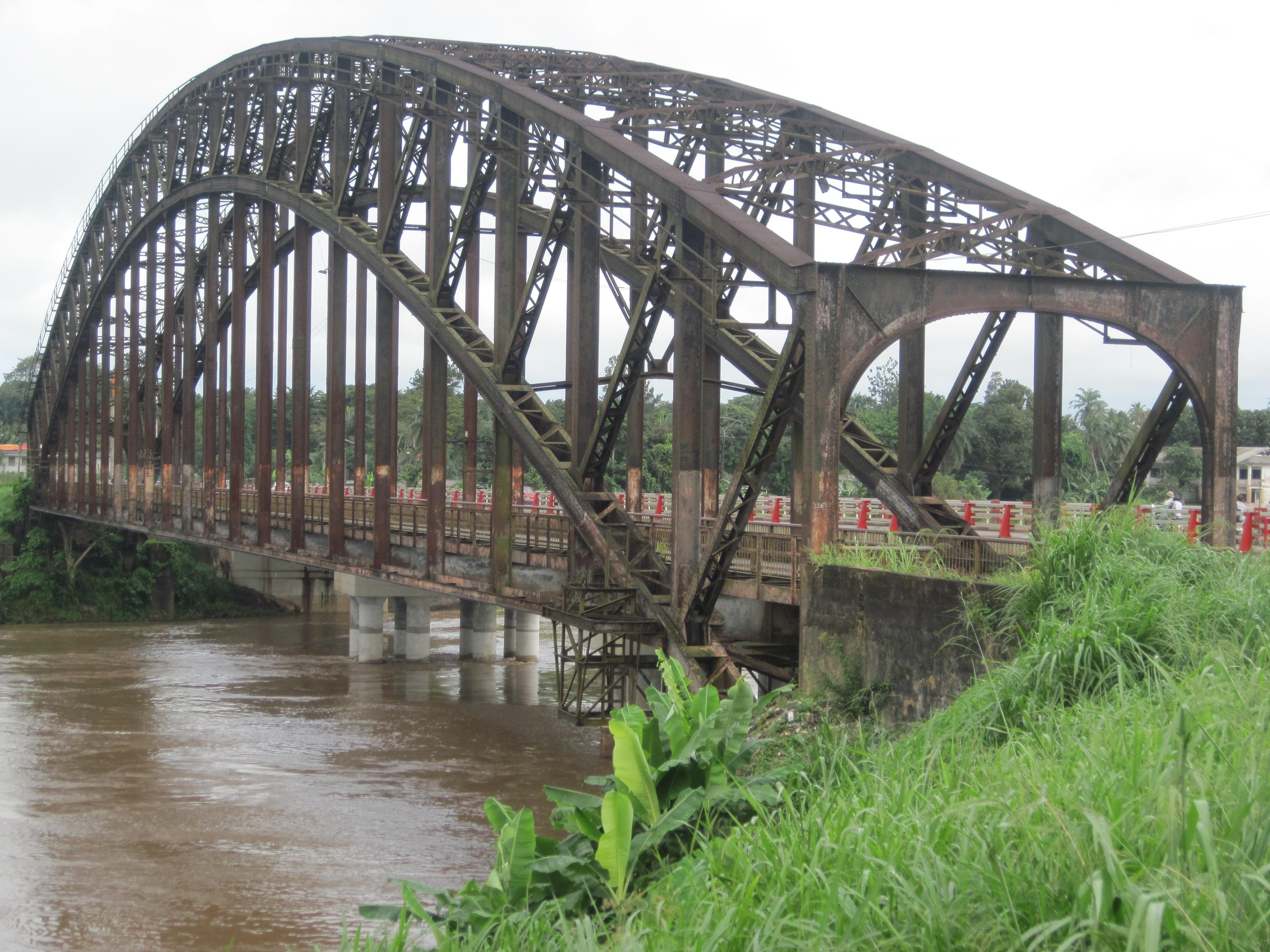
Modern view of the bridge.
