= Grand Eweng Hydroelectric Power Station =

- Map showing the location of Grand Eweng.
- Country: Cameroon
- Location: Sanaga-Maritime Department, Littoral Region
- Coordinates: 4°04′22″N 10°37′48″E
- Purpose: Power
- Status: Proposed

Dam and spillways
- Type of dam: Part Gravity dam / Part Rockfill dam
- Impounds: Sanaga River

Power Station
- Commission date: 2028 (Expected)
- Installed capacity: 1,000 MW (Expected)

The Grand Eweng Hydroelectric Power Station, also Grand Eweng Power Station, is a planned approximately 1,800 megawatt hydroelectric power project across the Sanaga River to be constructed in Cameroon. The Grand Eweng power station is expected to be the largest hydroelectric energy source in Cameroon. The Grand Eweng project is under development by Hydromine from the United States on behalf of the Government of Cameroon on a build-own-operate-transfer (BOOT) concession basis.

== Location ==
The power station will be located at the Grand Eweng site, on the Sanaga River, approximately 8 kilometres (5 mi) by road upstream from the town of Sackbayeme and 100 kilometres (60 mi) equidistant midway between Yaoundé and Douala, located in the eastern Littoral Region near the villages of Log Pagal and Kahn, bordering the western Centre Region. The power station will be approximately 25 km upstream of the existing Song Loulou Hydroelectric Power Station. The coordinates of the Grand Eweng site are: 4°04’22”N, 10°37’48”E.

== Overview ==
The Grand Eweng Power Station is a hydroelectric power project currently under development in Cameroon that will be constructed on the lower Sanaga River upstream from the Song Loulou Hydroelectric Power Station. The proposed Grand Eweng Hydroelectric Power Station consists of a dam and reservoir with a hydroelectric facility with an installed power of about 1,000 MW in the first phase to be financed as an independent power producer.

The Grand Eweng Hydroelectric Power Station will differ from earlier hydropower plants in Cameroon, in that it will have large both electricity generation and water storage capacities, making it a strategic hydroelectric facility for managing the Cameroon energy sector and Sanaga River. The main benefits of Grand Eweng will include energy production, improving Sanaga River water regulation, decreasing the cost of electricity, reducing pollution, and contributing to the economic development of the project area and country as a whole.

== Timeline ==
The Grand Eweng hydroelectric site was identified on the lower Sanaga River in 1983 by the Société Nationale d’Électriticité du Cameroun (SONEL), at that time the national electricity company responsible for the development and operation of electricity supply in Cameroon, as part of the Hydropower Potential Atlas of Cameroon.

The Government of Cameroon and project sponsor Hydromine, an American sustainable energy company, entered into a project development agreement (PDA) in 2015, since extended, to develop the Grand Eweng Hydroelectric Power Station, following a letter of intent in 2009 and memorandum of understanding in 2012. Hydromine has financed detailed feasibility studies, including front-end engineering design (FEED) and environmental and social impact assessment (ESIA), as well as financial, economic, and legal analyses, confirming the project’s attractiveness and viability for Cameroon and financing.

In mid-2019, the Government of Cameroon, represented by the Ministry of Water and Energy (MINEE), Hydromine, and Eneo Cameroon (ENEO) signed a letter of intent that defines the cooperation among the parties to finalize the terms of a power purchase agreement (PPA) with ENEO for the sale of electricity produced by the Grand Eweng Power Station. In addition, the letter of intent sets out the framework and milestones for build-own-operate-transfer (BOOT) development model, which transfers the Grand Eweng Hydroelectric Power Station to the Government of Cameroon after the concession term.

In late 2019 and early 2020 public consultations for the ESIA for the impacted populations in the Sanaga-Maritime and Nyong-et-Kéllé departments were initiated with the in-person participation of the Minister of Water and Energy and the Governors of the Littoral and Centre Regions. The Minister of Water and Energy stated in his visit of September 5, 2019, to Pouma: “The hydroelectric development project of Grand Eweng will be realized. […] In Central Africa, it is the most important. For the Government, for the well-being of the population, the development of this structure is a major imperative.”

As of March 2020, the Grand Eweng Hydroelectric Power Station is planned to start construction at the end of 2022 and begin generating electricity in 2027-2028.

== See also ==
- List of power stations in Cameroon
- List of hydropower stations in Africa
- List of hydroelectric power stations
