= Kikot Hydroelectric Power Station =

Power station in Cameroon

- Location of Kikot Power Station; Placement on map is approximate Kikot Hydroelectric Power Station (Africa) Kikot Hydroelectric Power Station (Earth)
- Location: Kikot, Cameroon
- Coordinates: 04°10′15.5″N 11°01′25″E
- Construction began: 2025 Expected
- Opening date: 2030 Expected
- Construction cost: €991 million
- Owner: Kikot Hydro Power Company

Dam and spillways
- Type of dam: RCC Gravity dam
- Impounds: Sanaga River

Power Station
- Operator: Kikot Hydro Power Company
- Commission date: 2030 Expected
- Installed capacity: 500 MW

The Kikot Hydroelectric Power Station (KHPS), is a planned 500 megawatt run-of-the-river hydroelectric power station under development in Cameroon across the Sanaga River. The development rights were granted to Kikot Hydro Power Company (KHPC), a special purpose vehicle company (SPV), owned by Électricité de France and the Government of Cameroon. A long-term power purchase agreement (PPA) is yet to be signed between Eneo Cameroon S.A. and KHPC.

== Location ==
The dam lies across the Sanaga River, about 60 kilometres (37 mi), as the crow flies, north-west of Yaoundé, the capital city of Cameroon. The road distance is about 147 kilometres (91 mi). The power station would straddle Sanaga River across the border between the Littoral Region and the Centre Region of the country.

== Overview ==
In November 2019, EDF signed a memorandum of understanding with the government of Cameroon (GOC), to jointly build a power station, across the Sanaga River, downstream of the Nachtigal Hydroelectric Power Station with generation capacity between 450 and 700 megawatts. In June the MOU was upgraded to a development agreement between EDF and the GOC.

According to EDF, the period between 2022 and 2024 is being used to form the SPV company, carry out environmental and feasibly studies, source funding and reach financial close and related milestones including signing the PPA. Construction would then start in 2025, with commercial commissioning expected in 2030.

== Ownership ==
The power station is owned by the special purpose company named Kikot Hydro Power Company (KHPC). The table below illustrates the shareholding in KHPC.

Shareholding In Kikot Hydro Power Company
| Rank | Shareholder | Domicile | Percentage | Notes |
|---|---|---|---|---|
| 1 | Électricité de France | France | | |
| 2 | Government of Cameroon | Cameroon | | |
| | Total | | | |

== Construction costs ==
The estimated costs for the dam and power plant is CFA 650 billion (approx. US$1.050 billion) also (approx. €991 billion) in October 2023. The World Bank Group, particularly the International Finance Corporation (IFC) are expected to be major funders in this project.

== Timeline and commissioning ==
According to EDF construction is expected to commence in 2025. Commercial commissioning is expected in 2030.

== See also ==
- List of power stations in Cameroon
- Nachtigal Hydroelectric Power Station
