= Nyakélé =

Coordinates: 4.08°N 10.35°E

Nyakélé is a very small town in the Littoral Region of Cameroon, on the continent of Africa. It belongs to the Sanaga-Maritime department whose capital is Édéa.

Small neighboring towns include; Ngakélé, Nyanon, Nyoudem and Pendiki, while the major neighboring cities include; Yaoundé, Édéa, Douala and Bafoussam.
