= Lake Tissongo =

- Location within Cameroon Location within Africa
- Coordinates: 3°34′8″N 9°52′44″E
- Type: reservoir
- Primary inflows: Sanaga River
- Basin countries: Cameroon

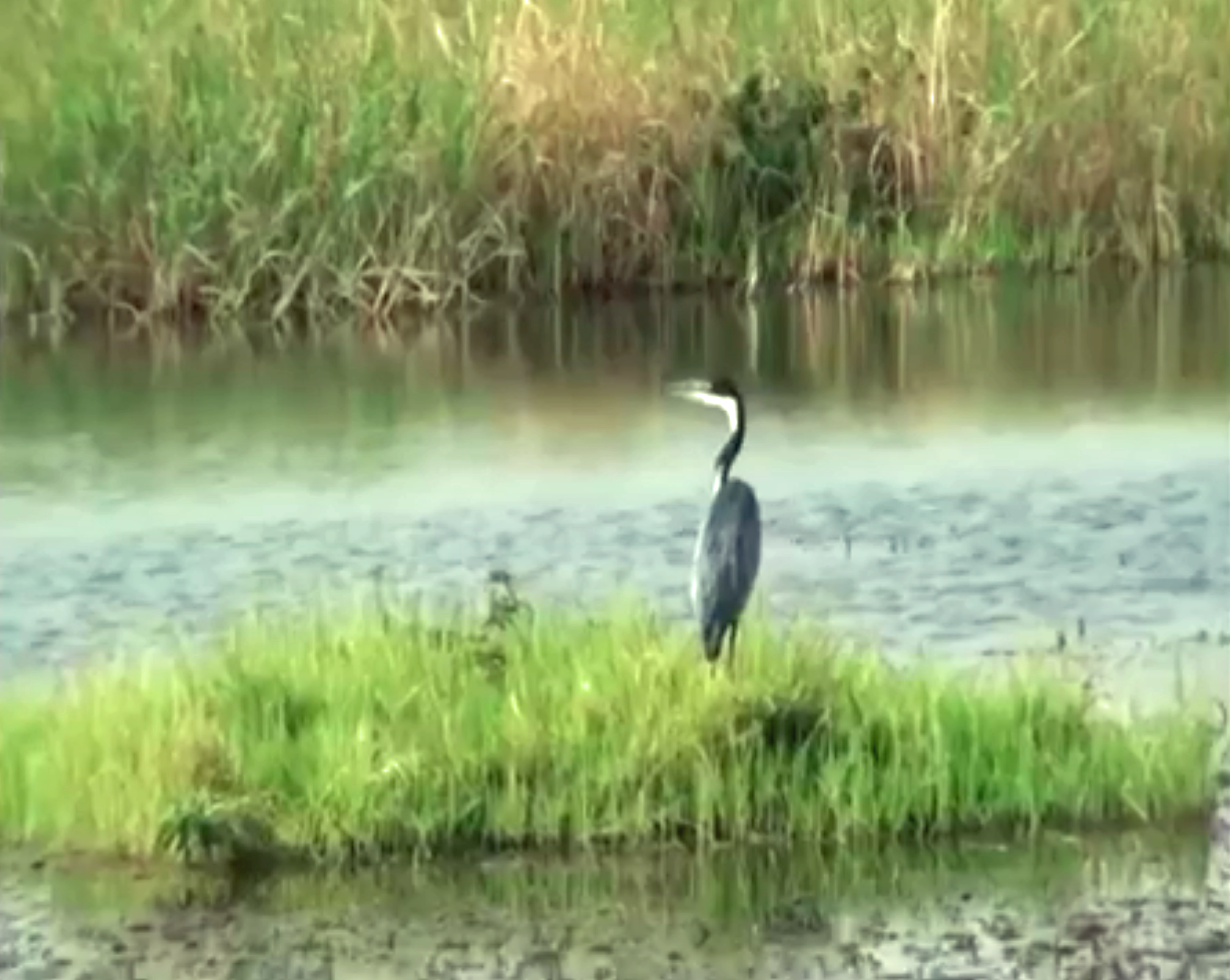
Lake Tissongo

Lake Tissongo is a lake of western Cameroon. It is situated within the Douala Edéa Wildlife Reserve of Littoral Province, and is connected to the south bank of the Sanaga River by a 5 kilometres (3.1 mi) tidal channel. The lake drains into the river about 40 kilometres downstream of Edéa. The area is biologically rich. The villagers of five villages in the reserve in the area earn their livelihoods from hunting bushmeat, and a 1990 survey found some 50 firearms in the area around Lake Tissongo.
