= Mining industry of Cameroon =

Despite being a mineral rich country, Cameroon has only recently begun to investigate mining on an industrial scale. Strong metal and industrial mineral prices since 2003 have encouraged companies to develop mines here. The terrain mainly consists of granite-rich ground with areas of ultramafic rocks that are sources of cobalt and nickel. There are also deposits of bauxite, gold, iron ore, nepheline syenite, and rutile. Alluvial gold is mainly mined by artisanal miners.

== Cameroon Overview ==
Cameroon has a total area of approximately 475 445 thousand square kilometers, a coastline of some 400 kilometers, and a population approaching 27 million people.

== Mining History ==
Prior to 2008, Cameroon had no industrial mining history. Cameroon's undeveloped mineral resources include bauxite, cobalt, gold from lode deposits, granite, iron ore, nepheline syenite, nickel, and rutile. Strong metal and industrial mineral prices since 2003 have encouraged companies to develop mines. The Nkamouna enriched cobalt-nickel-manganese-iron laterite deposits and several other nickeliferous laterite deposits in southeast Cameroon were first discovered and investigated by the United Nations Development Programme (UNDP) during 1981–1986, in a cooperative project with the Cameroon Ministry of Mines, Water and Energy to evaluate mineral potential in southeastern Cameroon. Due to the remote location and the low nickel prices at the time, the discovery did not draw much attention. No further exploration took place on the property until geologist William Buckovic became aware of the nickel discovery in 1988.

The southeast region and nearby regions in Gabon, Republic of the Congo, and Central African Republic have few producing mineral deposits and few with near-term production potential. Most of this region is underlain by Proterozoic granite-gneiss-schist terrains. Within the region, ultramafic rocks, the original source of the cobalt and nickel, are confined to the project area. There has been no previous production of minerals from the project area.

Alluvial gold is artisanally exploited from stream gravels in parts of Cameroon, Gabon, Congo, and Central African Republic. However, the U.S. Geological Survey’s 2002 estimate for total gold production from all four countries combined is less than 1,600 kilograms, or less than 50,000 ounces per year. The portion of this yield from within a 300-km radius of the Geovic Project is likely on the order of 20,000 ounces per year, a relatively insignificant amount by international comparisons. In the southwest part of the Central African Republic, alluvial gold is accompanied by small quantities of alluvial diamonds in streams which drain Cretaceous sandstone and conglomerates exposed further east. The Cretaceous formations do not extend into Cameroon.

== Cameroon Mining Laws & Regulations ==
Law No 2016/017 of December 14, 2016 on Mining Code http://www.minmidt.cm/en/latest-news/295-law-2016-017-of-december-14th-2016-on-mining-code.html

== Commodities ==
=== Bauxite (Aluminum-bearing ore) ===
As of April 2008, bauxite is not mined in Cameroon; it is only smelted. The raw material is shipped from around the world to a smelter in Edéa where a supply of hydro-electric power is available for processing. The smelted metal is exported globally.

In 2019 Camrail and Canyon Resources were working on exploiting rich Bauxite deposits at Minim to feed the smelter at Edéa and for export.

=== Limestone ===
Limestone production in 2004 was 290,000 metric tons.

=== Cobalt ===
A Mining Permit was decreed in favor of GeoCam in 2003 that covers the entire cobalt mineral province in southeastern Cameroon, perhaps the largest primary cobalt resource in the world.

=== Diamonds ===
All buyers must obtain an authorization permit document Directly from the Ministry of Mines, Department of Mines and Geology. This will give the buyer the full rights to be able to purchase diamonds from Cameroon as well as in any CEMAC member states.

=== Gold ===
Gold yielded an estimated 20000 kg in 2004 and was produced by small-scale artisan miners, mostly in the eastern part of the country. The Cameroon Ministry of Mines has set up new procedures binding the sales of precious metals. She looks for many more investors via the use of these procedures. In situations whereby a new local mining is in a business transaction with a buyer who wants to invest in mining, the Ministry of Mines in the department of Mines and Industries, will first of all receive the said quantity of consignment to be shipped and carry out a due diligence with the buyer's end. This is usually done on an interview basis once they correspond together.'Positive results to this effect would give a go ahead to the deal'..

=== Iron Ore ===
- Ngovayang mining site
