= Memve'ele Hydroelectric Power Station =

Power station in Cameroon

- Map of Cameroon showing the location of Memve'ele HPP Memve'ele Hydroelectric Power Station (Africa) Memve'ele Hydroelectric Power Station (Earth)
- Country: Cameroon
- Location: Nyabissan, Ntem Valey Département, South Region (Cameroon)
- Coordinates: 02°23′47″N 10°23′56″E
- Purpose: Power
- Status: Operational
- Construction began: June 2012
- Opening date: April 2019
- Construction cost: US$831.6 million
- Owner: Government of Cameroon
- Operator: Electricity Development Corporation (EDC)

Dam and spillways
- Impounds: Ntem River

Power Station
- Commission date: December 2022 Expected
- Installed capacity: 211 megawatts (283,000 hp)
- Annual generation: 1,187 GWh

Memve'ele Hydroelectric Power Station is a 211 megawatt hydroelectric power station in Cameroon. Construction of this dam began in April 2012 and the dam produced its first 80 megawatts in April 2019. Full commercial operations are expected to begin once the 225 kiloVolt high voltage transmission line to Yaounde is completed.

== Location ==
The power station is located at the village of Nyabissan, in Ntem Valey Département, in the South Region of Cameroon, across the Ntem River. Nyabissan is located approximately 140 kilometres (87 mi), by road, southwest of Ebolowa, the nearest large town.

Nyabissan is located approximately 296 kilometres (184 mi), by road, southwest of Yaoundé, Cameroon's capital and second largest city.

== Overview ==
The development of this power station was originally led by a consortium comprising Globeleq and Sud Energie, based in the United Kingdom. In May 2009, that consortium backed out of the deal. That same year, Sinohydro, the Chinese state-owned construction company took over the development rights, as engineering, procurement and construction (EPC) contractor.

According to online reports, the construction phase began in earnest after the EPC contract with Sinohydro was executed in April 2012. The design calls for an earth fill dam measuring 20 metres (66 ft) high, creating a reservoir lake containing 19,000,000 cubic metres (670,978,668 cu ft) of water.

The design also calls for a 225kV high voltage evacuation line from the power station to Yaoundé, where most of the generated energy is destined. The installation of three 225kV/90kV transformers at Ebolowa, Nkoumou and Ahala, is part of the design.

== Construction costs ==
Due to multiple delays, the cost for this project has kept increasing over time. In May 2009, the cost estimates were €556 million (approx. US$795 million). As of August 2021, total cost for all the project components totaled US$831.6 million (approx. €727.2 million). As of December 2021, €5 million (approx. US$5.7 million) was still needed to compensate landowners, in order to allow the completion of the high voltage electricity evacuation line.

== Funding ==
The table below illustrates the funding sources for the power station, evacuation line and associated infrastructure, including electricity substations.

Sources of Funding for Isimba Hydroelectric Power Station
Rank	Name of Development Partner	Funding in USD (Millions)	Percentage
1	Exim Bank of China	531.6	63.9
2	African Development Bank	190.0	22.9
3	Government of Cameroon	110.0	13.2
	Total	831.6	100.00

== Operations ==
The energy generated at this power station is sold to Eneo Cameroon SA, the national electricity utility company.

== See also ==
- List of power stations in Cameroon
- Nachtigal Hydroelectric Power Station
