= Second Battle of Edea =

Battle in 1915 during the First World War

Coordinates: 3°48′N 10°08′E

- Part of the Kamerun campaign in World War I
Date	5 January 1915
Location	Edea, Kamerun
Result	French victory

Belligerents
France: (French Third Republic) French Equatorial Africa	German Empire: German Kamerun

Commanders and leaders
(French Third Republic) Col. Mayer	Carl Zimmermann

Strength
Unknown	1,000

Casualties and losses
4 killed 11 wounded	74 killed 102 wounded

The Second Battle of Edea was the German counter-attack against French forces stationed in the village of Edea during the Kamerun campaign of the First World War. Allied forces from Duala occupied the town following the First Battle of Edea in October 1914. The Germans, eager to retake the position attacked on 5 January 1915 but were repulsed by the French force.

== Background ==
The village of Edea was positioned on the Sanaga River, to the southeast of the major port city of Duala. A large portion of the German Duala garrison had withdrawn to this position following the Allied naval bombardment of the city. Following the Allied assaults on the Yapoma Bridge and Edea at the First Battle of Edea, the German force withdrew to the city of Jaunde further to the east along the southern railway line. This allowed Allied forces to occupy Edea unopposed on 26 October 1914. After the fall of Edea, the only remaining German force that could threaten General Dobell's hold on Duala was at the fort in Dschang to the north. On 2 January 1915 a British force under Colonel Edmund Georges captured the fort after a short bombardment.

== Battle ==
=== Attack on Kopongo ===
The loss of Dschang prompted a German counter-attack in an attempt to retake Duala. On 3 January, telegraph cables between Duala and Edea were cut by German forces to impede communications between Allied units. The French Senegalese force of Colonel Mayer that had taken the Japoma bridge had constructed a ring of defenses around their forward position at Kopongo, approximately 20 miles further inland from Edea. On 5 January, a German column of 150 attacked the French positions at Kopongo but were pushed back suffering significant casualties.

=== Attack on Edea ===
The German assault on Edea was conducted simultaneously to that on Kopongo. The French troops defending Edea had constructed a number of entrenchments and fortifications surrounding the town in preparation for the German attack. A force of around 1, 000 German troops assaulted Colonel Mayer's positions on 5 January. A number of infantry assaults against the French positions were carried out but each failed. After suffering up to 111 killed and a similar number wounded the German force withdrew back to Jaunde. Mayer's force reportedly suffered 4 killed and 11 wounded.

== Aftermath ==
The result of the Second Battle of Edea was the successful Allied defense of the region surrounding Duala. It consolidated Allied control in the region and allowed for further pushes to the east towards the German base at Jaunde. However, Dobell requested more reinforcements before he could make an assault on Jaunde because he felt that his force was spread too thin. Following their defeat, German forces launched an attack on British positions at Nkongsamba which failed. The German attempt to contain Dobell's forces was defeated forcing Zimmerman, the German commandant in Kamerun, to once again go on the defensive.
