= China International Water & Electric Corporation =

Chinese construction and engineering consulting company

- Native name: 中国水利电力对外有限公司
- Company type: State-owned enterprise
- Industry: Construction
- Headquarters: Beijing, China
- Number of employees: 20,000
- Parent: China Three Gorges Corporation
- Website: english.cwe.cn (in English)

China International Water & Electric Corporation (abbreviated CWE) is a Chinese construction and engineering consulting company that is a subsidiary of China Three Gorges Corporation (CTE). CWE specializes in the construction of water and hydropower projects but its work runs the gamut including road and bridge, power transmission, drainage and sewage treatment systems, dredging, port maintenance, and interior design.

Based on international contracting revenue in 2014 it was the 74th-largest international construction and engineering company according to Engineering News-Record.

== Engineering projects ==
The company has completed projects in China, the rest of Asia, Africa, and Europe, focusing especially on hydropower projects in developing countries. In battling for international contracts, CWE is a head-on rival with Sinohydro, another Chinese firm with a hydropower specialization, having ferociously competed with Sinohydro for the Karuma hydropower project in Uganda in 2013; in the end it lost to its rival.

- (North Macedonia) $80 million hydroelectric plant in that started operating in 2003.
- $556 million Isimba hydropower dam located in Busaana sub-county, Kayunga district, Uganda.
- (Cameroon) $200 million Lom Pangar Dam hydropower project consisting of a main dam across the Sanaga River, signed in 2011.
- (Guinea) $526 million Kaleta hydroelectric dam completed in July 2015 on budget and a year head of schedule. Bloomberg noted the project had a symbolic significance as it was completed during the Ebola outbreak affecting the country, showing the endurance of Chinese companies in Africa in contrast to Western companies that had fled during the crisis.

== Transportation ==
In 2023, CWE was awarded a $212 million contract for the design and build of depots, terminals, a driving school, and permanent civil and structural works along bus routes for the Davao Public Transport Modernization in the Philippines.

== Wind power ==
Although mainly associated with hydropower, CWE is also involved in wind power. Its parent company, CTE, seeks to develop a 49.5 MW wind farm in Thatta, Pakistan, and in 2011 signed on its subsidiary CWE and another company, China Huashui Development Corporation (CHDC), to install turbines manufactured by Goldwind. In 2013, the company planned to design, build and operate a 300 MW wind farm in Jordan with joint venture partner Goldwind.
