= Douala Edéa National Park =

National park in Cameroon

- IUCN category II (national park)
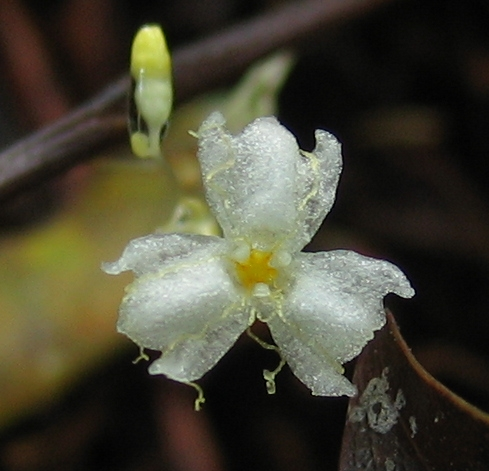
- Gymnosiphon longistylus, Douala-Edea National Park
- Interactive map of Douala Edéa National Park
- Nearest city: Douala, Edéa
- Coordinates: 3°33′0″N 9°46′0″E
- Area: 2,715.12 square kilometres (1,048.31 sq mi)
- Established: 1932, National Park in 2018.

Douala-Edéa National Park, formerly known as Douala-Edéa Wildlife Reserve, is a national park in the Littoral Region of Cameroon.

== Location ==
The park is located on either side of the mouth of the Sanaga River along the shores of the Bight of Biafra opposite the island of Bioko. Lake Tissongo, a lagoon connected to the south bank of the Sanaga River by a 5 kilometres (3.1 mi) tidal channel, is included in the reserve.

Mouanko is the main town in the reserve, on the north shore of the Sanaga River.

== History ==
The reserve was established in 1932. Cameroon designated the reserve as a wildlife park for scientific purposes in 1971, and by 1974 the reserve had a conservator and guard post. It was designated a national park in 2018.

As of 2000, it covered 160,000 hectares (400,000 acres). Upgrade to full national park status was delayed since oil had been discovered in Cameroon's coastal areas, and the area could hold important reserves.

In October 2018, it was upgraded to national park status.

== Flora ==
80% of the reserve is covered by tropical lowland equatorial forest, and 15% by Atlantic mangrove forests. The Mouanko reserve between the Sanaga and the Wouri estuary holds about 15,000 hectares (37,000 acres) of mangrove forests. The mangroves form a buffer against coastal erosion, and are a refuge for 80% of the local marine and aquatic species for at least part of their lifecycle. They are threatened by logging for construction timber and for firewood used in fish smoking, as well as by urban infrastructure development. Illegal loggers were expelled from the park in 1976.

== Fauna ==
Fauna include forest elephants, primates (chimpanzees, monkey Singes de la réserve de faune de Douala - Edea 14species such as black colobus), antelopes (sitatunga, blue duiker, etc.), West African manatees, sea turtles, dolphins, crocodiles, alligator, many fish species, terrestrial and water bird species. The red-capped mangabey was reported to be common in the reserve in 1972. The endangered red-eared nose-spotted guenon was reported in the Lombé part of the reserve in densities of 2–3 groups per square kilometers, but populations had dropped elsewhere due to hunting. Animals in the reserve are poorly protected and poaching is widespread. Central chimpanzees in the reserve are threatened by hunters.
