= Lom Pangar Dam =

Dam in Bertoua, Cameroon

- Location within Cameroon
- Country: Cameroon
- Location: Bertoua
- Coordinates: 5°22′16.87″N 13°30′44.67″E
- Purpose: Power, river regulation
- Status: Under construction
- Construction began: 2012
- Opening date: 2017
- Construction cost: US$195.69 million

Dam and spillways
- Type of dam: Embankment, center section gravity dam
- Impounds: Lom River
- Height: 46 m (151 ft)
- Length: 1,278 m (4,193 ft)
- Width (crest): 7 m (23 ft)

Reservoir
- Total capacity: 6,000×10^{6} m^{3} (4,900,000 acre⋅ft)
- Surface area: 540 km^{2} (210 sq mi)

Power Station
- Turbines: 4 x 7.5 MW (10,100 hp) Francis-type
- Installed capacity: 30 MW (40,000 hp)

The Lom Pangar Dam is an embankment dam with a center gravity dam section currently under construction on the Lom River about 88 kilometres (55 mi) north of Bertoua in the East Region of Cameroon. It is located about 4 kilometres (2.5 mi) downstream of the Lom River's confluence with the Pangar River and about 13 kilometres (8.1 mi) upstream of where the Lom joins the Sanaga River. The dam's purpose is to produce hydroelectric power and regulate water flows along the Sanaga River. It is potentially part of a larger dam cascade on the Sanaga.

== Funding and development ==
The African Development Bank issued a US$71.1 million loan for the project in November 2011. The World Bank also approved a US$132 million loan in March 2012, and the President of Cameroon, Paul Biya, laid the foundation stone for the dam on 3 August 2012. The European Investment Bank approved a US$39 million loan in October of the same year. China International Water & Electric Corporation is constructing the dam and power plant. A coffer dam to divert the river around the dam foundation was completed in July 2013. The project was completed in 2017.

== See also ==
- List of power stations in Cameroon
