= Nachtigal Hydroelectric Power Station =

Dam in Cameroon

Natchigal Dam
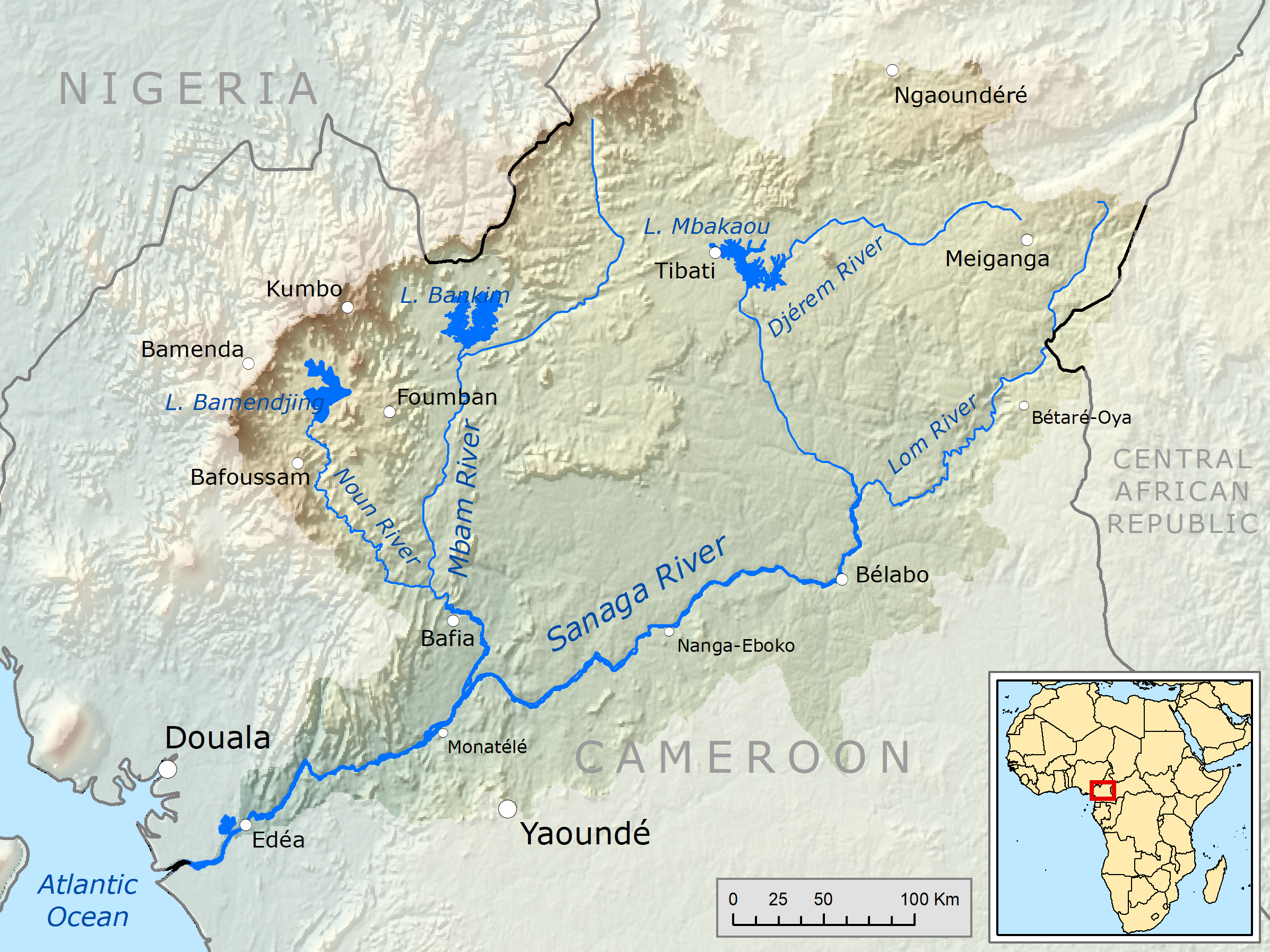

- Location of Natchtigal Power Station
- Location: Natchtigal, Cameroon
- Coordinates: 04°21′03″N 11°38′00″E
- Construction began: 2018
- Opening date: From 10 May 2024 until 18 March 2025
- Construction cost: €1.2 billion
- Owner: Nachtigal Hydro Power Company

Dam and spillways
- Type of dam: RCC Gravity dam
- Impounds: Sanaga River
- Height: 14 m (46 ft)
- Length: 2,000 m (6,600 ft)

Reservoir
- Total capacity: 27.9×10^{6} m^{3} (9.9×10^{8} cu ft)
- Surface area: 4.21 km^{2} (1.63 sq mi)

Power Station
- Operator: Nachtigal Hydro Power Company
- Commission date: July 2024 Expected
- Turbines: 7 x GE Francis 60 MW
- Installed capacity: 420 MW (560,000 hp)
- Annual generation: 3,000 GWh (11,000 TJ)

The Nachtigal Hydroelectric Power Station is a 420 megawatt run-of-the-river hydroelectric power station under development in Cameroon across the Sanaga River, which harnesses the energy of the Nachtigal Falls. The development rights were granted to Nachtigal Hydro Power Company (NHPC), a company owned by a consortium comprising (a) Électricité de France (b) International Finance Corporation and (c) the Government of Cameroon. A 35-year power purchase agreement is in place, between Eneo Cameroon S.A. and NHPC.

== Location ==
The dam lies across the Sanaga River, about 65 kilometres (40 mi) north-east of Yaoundé, the capital city of Cameroon.

== Overview ==
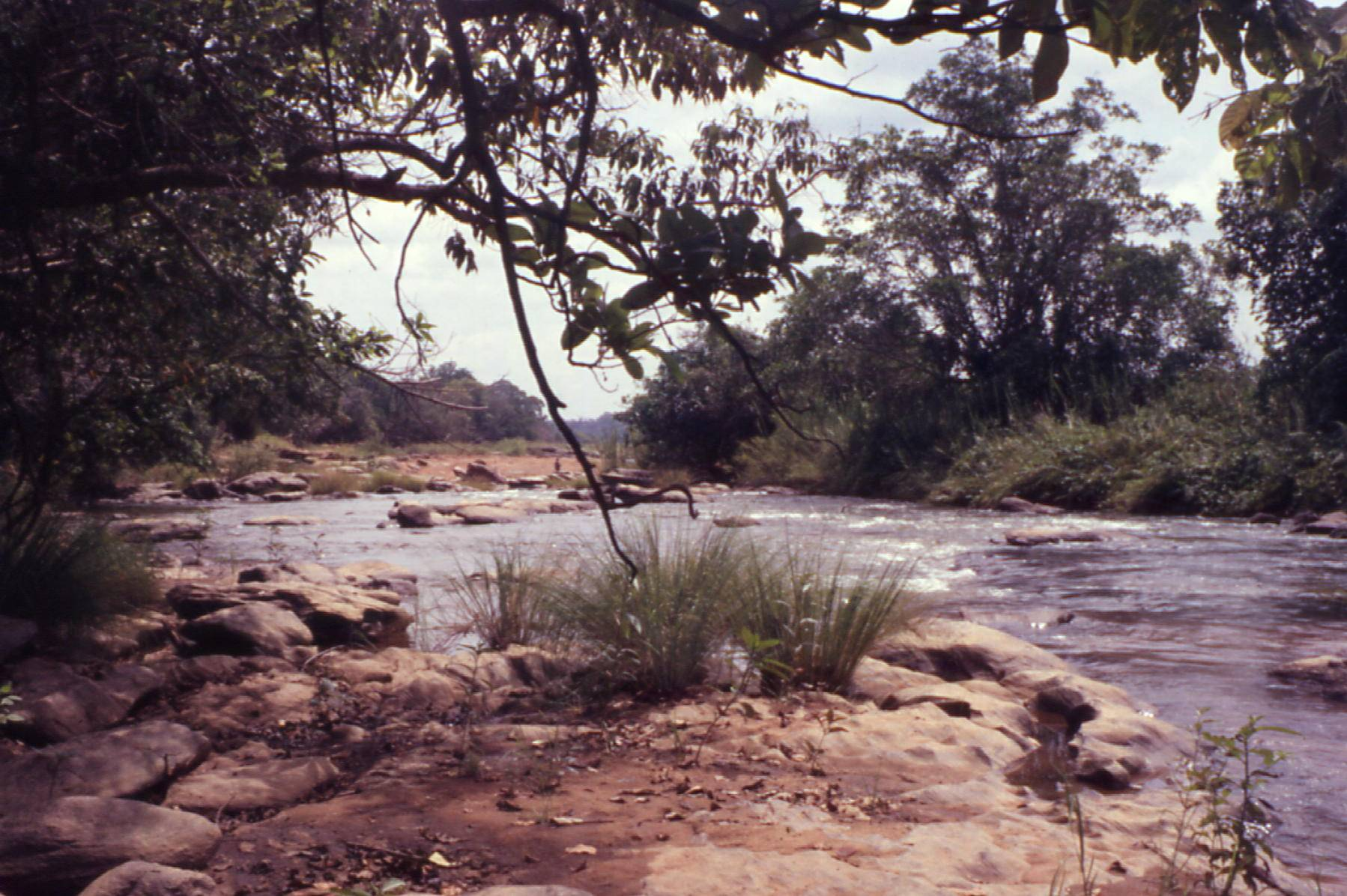
Nachtigal Falls in 1973

The design calls for a gravity dam with a power potential of 420 megawatts, powered by seven turbines, each with a capacity of 60 megawatts. The roller-compacted concrete (RCC) dam will create a reservoir with a surface area of 4.21 square kilometres (1,040 acres), capable of storing 2.78 million m³ of water.

As part of this project, NHPC the concessionaire, will construct a double circuit 225 kilovolt high voltage transmission line measuring 50.3 kilometres (31 mi) in length, that will transmit the generated power to a substation where it will be integrated into the national electricity grid. Once the high voltage transmission line is constructed and operational, ownership, operation and maintenance will transfer to National Electricity Transmission Company (Sonatrel).

== Ownership ==
The power station is owned by the special purpose company named Nachtigal Hydro Power Company (NHPC). The table below illustrates the shareholding in NHPC. In 2019, two more shareholders joined the original three. Africa50, a subsidiary of the African Development Bank, took a 15 percent shareholding in NHPC. Stoa Infra & Energy from France also acquired a 10 percent shareholding in the project.

Shareholding In Nachtigal Hydro Power Company
Rank	Shareholder	Domicile	Percentage	Notes
1	Électricité de France	France	40.00	
2	International Finance Corporation	United States	20.00	
3	Government of Cameroon	Cameroon	15.00	
4	Africa50	Ivory Coast	15.00	
5	Stoa Infra & Energy	France	10.00	
	Total		100.0	

== Construction costs ==
The estimated costs for the dam and power plant was €1.2 billion in 2018. Approximately €300 million (25 percent) was raised internally by the NHPC consortium as equity investment. The remaining amount, about €900 million, was borrowed from the eleven international financiers and four Cameroonian banks. Some of the lenders to this project include the following:

- African Development Bank
- Africa Finance Corporation
- French Development Agency
- Proparco
- International Finance Corporation
- Societe Generale des Banques au Cameroun
- Standard Chartered Cameroon
- Emerging Africa Infrastructure Fund
- FMO (Netherlands)
- European Investment Bank

== Timeline and commissioning ==
In December 2021, Afrik21 reported that the first 60 megawatt turbine was expected to be commissioned in July 2023. The final and seventh of equally rated turbines is expected to come online in July 2024.

On 10 May 2024, the first turbine started supplying 60 MW to the grid. The remaining six turbines are expected to come online at a rate of approximately one per month until the seventh turbine scheduled for activation in December 2024. The last turbine was brought online on 18 March 2025.

== See also ==
- List of power stations in Cameroon
- Kikot Hydroelectric Power Station
