= Kribi Power Station =

- Map of Cameroon showing the location of Kribi Power Station; Placement on map is approximate
- Country: Cameroon
- Location: Mpolongwe, Kribi
- Coordinates: 03°01′33″N 09°58′36″E
- Status: Operational
- Commission date: June 2013
- Owner: Kribi Power Development Company (KPDC)

Thermal power station
- Primary fuel: Natural gas

Power generation
- Units operational: 13 (16.6 MW)
- Nameplate capacity: 216 MW

Kribi Power Station is a 216 MW natural gas-fired thermal power plant in Cameroon.

== Location ==
The power station is located in the community of Mpolongwe, approximately 10 kilometres (6.2 mi), by road, north of the coastal town of Kribi (est. pop. 60,000 in 2007), in Océan Department, South Province, on the Gulf of Guinea, at the mouth of the Kienké River. This location lies approximately 150 kilometres (93 mi), by road, south of Douala, the largest city in Cameroon and the busiest port in the country (est.pop. 2 million in 2005).

== Description ==
Kribi Power Station is owned and operated by Kribi Power Development Corporation (KPDC), an affiliate of AES Group, an American power generating company that also owns Cameroon's power distribution company, AES-SONEL. The power station is designed and built to generate capacity output of 216MW by burning natural gas provided by National Hydrocarbons Corporation (SNH). The plant is also designed to use diesel, if the natural gas is unavailable.

The power generated under a voltage of 11 kV is transformed by step-up power transformers (5x 60 MVA, Siemens) to be transmitted via a 225 kV double circuits high tension transmission line of approximately 100 kilometres (62 mi) to Mangombé, near Edéa, where it is integrated in the national electric grid. Moreover, a step-down transformer (36MVA, Siemens) enables feeding Kribi under 30 kV. At completion date, the 216MW of electricity supplied by the plant increased Cameroon's generated capacity to 1,233 MW. Hydroelectric plants supply 720MW (58.4%) and thermal power plants supply the remaining 513 (41.6%).

== Construction costs ==
Construction of the power station is budgeted to cost about US$390 million (CFA:176.3 billion). Of that US$132.5 million (CFA:60 billion) is provided as a loan, by a consortium of banks led by Ecobank. The African Development Bank (AfDB) will lend another US$64.3 million (EUR:45 million). The remaining US$193.2 million (CFA:87.5 billion) will be sourced from other lenders.

== Timeframe ==
Construction began in March 2009. Commissioning was completed in June 2013.

== See also ==
- Kribi
- List of power stations in Cameroon
- List of power stations in Africa
