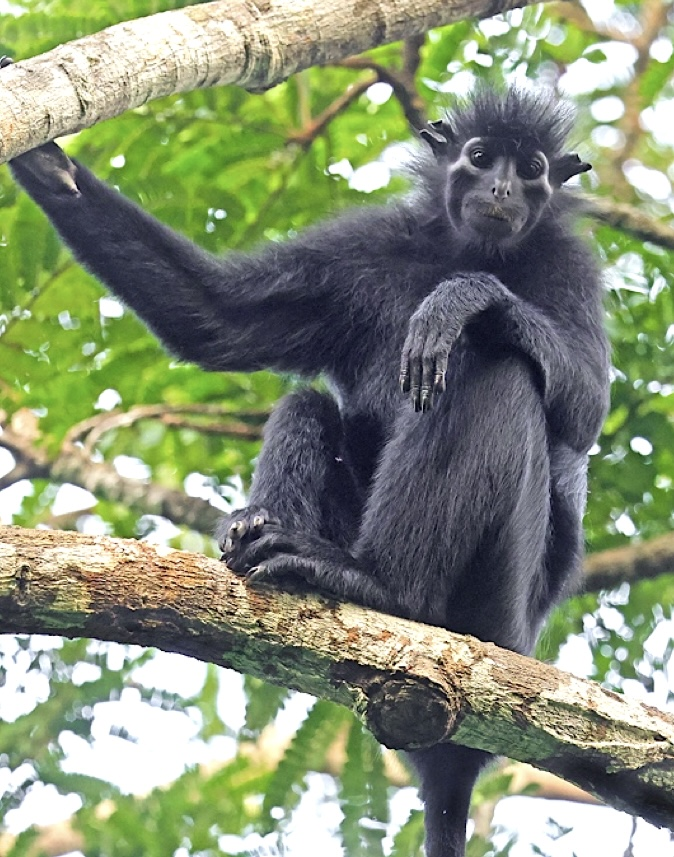

Conservation status
- Vulnerable (IUCN 3.1)

Scientific classification
- Kingdom: Animalia
- Phylum: Chordata
- Class: Mammalia
- Order: Primates
- Family: Cercopithecidae
- Genus: Colobus
- Species: C. satanas

Binomial name
- Colobus satanas Waterhouse, 1838

Subspecies
- C. s. satanas; C. s .anthracinus
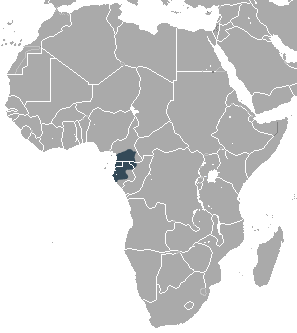
- Black colobus range

= Black colobus =

Species of Old World monkey

The black colobus (Colobus satanas), or satanic black colobus, is a species of Old World monkey belonging to the genus Colobus. The species is found in a small area of western central Africa. Black colobuses are large, completely covered with black fur, and like all other Colobus monkeys, do not have a thumb. The species has faced large declines in population due to habitat destruction and hunting by humans, and was consequently listed as Vulnerable on the IUCN Red List in 1994.

== Taxonomy ==
The black colobus monkey is one of five recognised species in the genus Colobus. The black colobus is the oldest species in this genus and is thought to have diverged 3-4 million years ago.

There are two subspecies of black colobus monkey:

- Colobus satanas satanas – Bioko black colobus (Waterhouse, 1838)
- Colobus satanas anthracinus – Gabon black colobus (Le Conte, 1857)

== Etymology ==
The word 'Colobus' comes from the Greek word for 'mutilated', as all Colobus monkeys only have a short stump where the thumb would be. The word 'satanas' means 'the accuser' or 'the devil' in Greek.

== Description ==
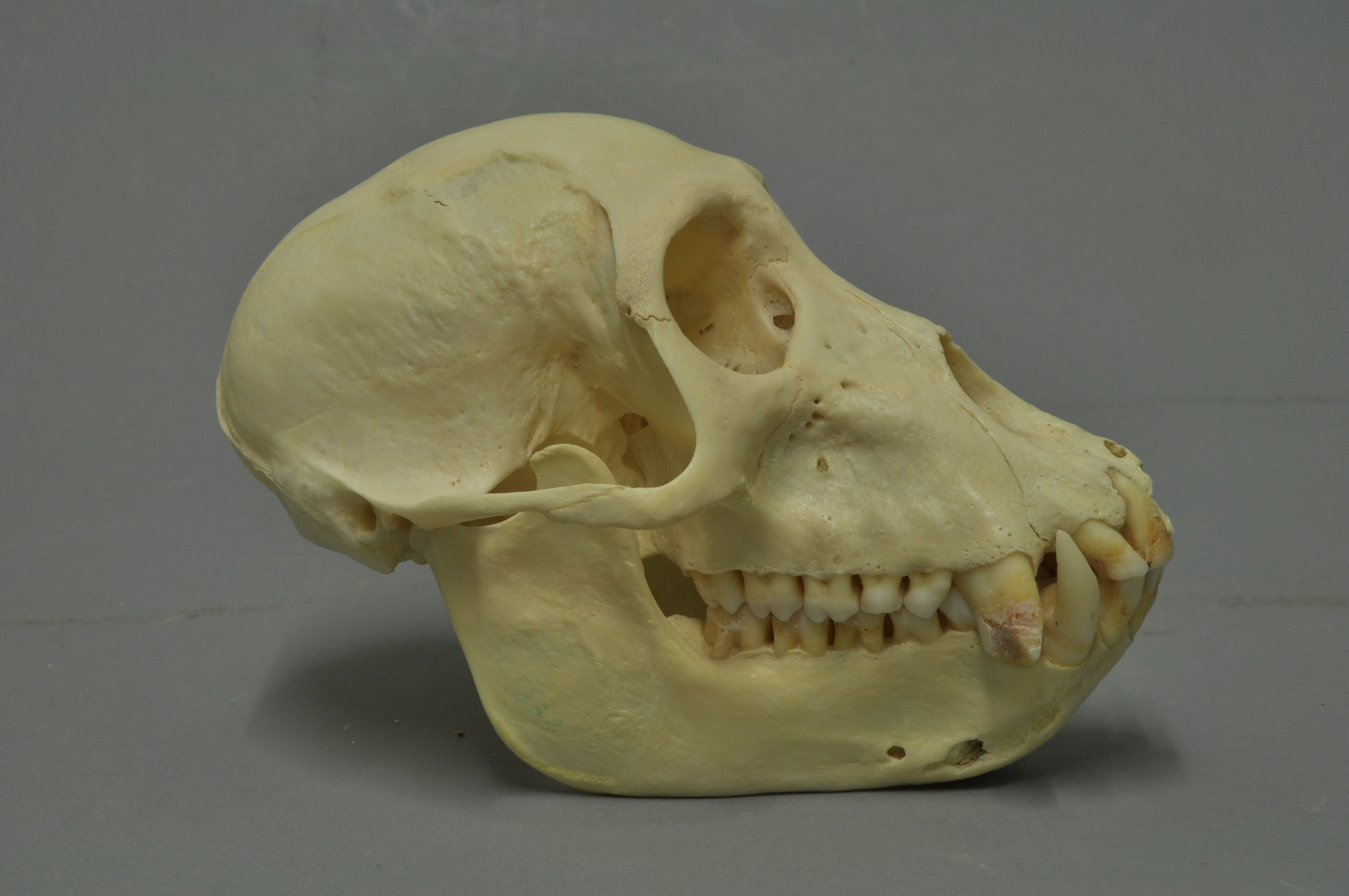
Colobus satanas skull

The black colobus monkey is a large species with a head-body length of 50–70 cm and a long tail of around 80 cm. As in all Colobus species, the black colobus has a slender build and ischial callosities - tough pads of skin on the rump. There is little sexual dimorphism between the two sexes - adult males can weigh between 10–15 kg, whilst females weigh between 10–11 kg. The black colobus is covered in black fur apart from the ears and face, and has longer hairs on its cheeks and forehead. Unlike other species of colobus monkey, black colobuses have no white markings. The two subspecies of black colobus look very similar, although the fur of Colobus s. satanas is slightly longer and fluffier. There is currently not enough data to estimate the life expectancy of the species.

== Distribution and habitat ==
The black colobus monkey is found in Equatorial Guinea, south west Cameroon and central and north-western Gabon. Small populations may also occur in the north of the Republic of the Congo. The subspecies C.s.satanas is only found on Bioko Island, off the coast of Cameroon. The distribution of the black colobus has decreased dramatically - the species is now rare or absent in some areas of its range due to its habitat being destroyed for logging. Black colobuses are known to live at low densities, but there is currently no total population estimate for the species. One of the largest remaining populations of the species, consisting of 50,000-55,900 individuals, is found in Lope Reserve, Gabon. Other remaining large populations are found in the Foret des Abeilles in central Gabon and Douala-Edea Reserve in Cameroon.

The black colobus is an arboreal species that lives high in the canopy of dense rainforest and occasionally coastal sand dune or wooded meadows. Black colobuses are unable to survive in secondary forest that has regrown after a major disturbance such as logging and therefore tend to avoid areas populated by humans. The black colobus cannot be bred in captivity due to the food and habitat it requires.

== Behaviour ==
=== Diet ===
Black colobus monkeys are herbivores and feed predominantly on seeds. Their robust, flat teeth allow them to chew tough seeds easily. This diet means that the species plays an important role as seed dispersers in the ecosystem. Black colobuses also eat large amounts of leaves, in particular lianas, as well as flowers, buds and unripe fruits. Unlike most primates, Colobus monkeys have multi-chambered ruminant stomachs which allow them to easily digest these leaves. Younger leaves and seeds are preferred, as these are rich in nutrients and contain lower amounts of digestion-inhibiting compounds such as tannin. However, the black colobus monkey can withstand high levels of these poisonous compounds and can therefore eat food that is undigestable to other colobus monkeys. This means they can live in areas unoccupied by other species. Black colobus monkeys have also been observed eating soil, which may be to ensure that they have enough minerals such as sodium in their diet.

=== Social structure ===
Black colobus monkeys live in multi-male groups of 10-20 individuals. The species is territorial and will make loud calls to warn other groups away from the area in which they are feeding. The black colobus call is distinctive from other primate species and sounds like a loud 'sneeze' followed by a roaring noise. Black colobus groups are sometimes joined by single male crested mona monkeys (Cercopithecus pogonias). These individuals take part in black colobus grooming and socialising and are thought integrate themselves into black colobus groups for protection. Colobus monkeys have been known to respond to crested mona monkey alarm calls.

=== Activity ===
Black colobus monkeys are diurnal and spend around 60% of their time resting. The remaining part of their day is spent feeding, socialising and moving. Black colobuses have large home ranges and will move up to 850 metres each day in search of food.

=== Reproduction ===
Black colobus monkeys do not have a specific breeding season, but most mating occurs during rainy times of the year. Males reach sexual maturity at age 6, in females this occurs at age 4. Females do not have a sexual swelling as seen in other primate species and give birth to a single baby after a gestation period of around 195 days. Females have a baby every 20 months on average. Black colobus babies are born with brown fur and become black, unlike all other Colobus species, which are born with white fur. Allomothering, when other members of the group help mothers to care for their babies, is relatively rare in the black colobus monkey. Black colobus babies are carried around by the mother and spend time playing with other members of the group as they grow in order to learn and socialise.

== Conservation ==
The black colobus monkey is one of the most threatened primate species in Africa and is currently listed as Vulnerable on the IUCN Red List. This is because the species' population has declined by over 30% in the past 30 years. The subspecies C.s.satanas is classified as Endangered as its population has declined by over 60% in the last 30 years. The black colobus monkey is now only found in areas which cannot be easily accessed by humans.

The species has faced population declines due to logging and illegal hunting for the fur trade which began in the 19th century. Due to improved roads and increased wealth in the area, commercial hunting for the species has become more profitable. Today, black colobus monkeys are mainly traded for their meat and account for 20% of the bushmeat sold in Malabo, the capital of Equatorial Guinea. One adult black colobus carcass is sold for around US$20.42.

The black colobus monkey is listed under Appendix II of CITES, which restricts international trade of the species. The species is also listed under Class B of the African Convention on the Conservation of Nature and Natural Resources. Further information and data is needed to in order to help conserve the species. Conservation programs such as the Bioko Biodiversity Protection Program aim to work with local people to learn more about the black colobus monkey and protect it from extinction.
