= Massock =

Commune in Littoral Region, Cameroon

- Commune and town
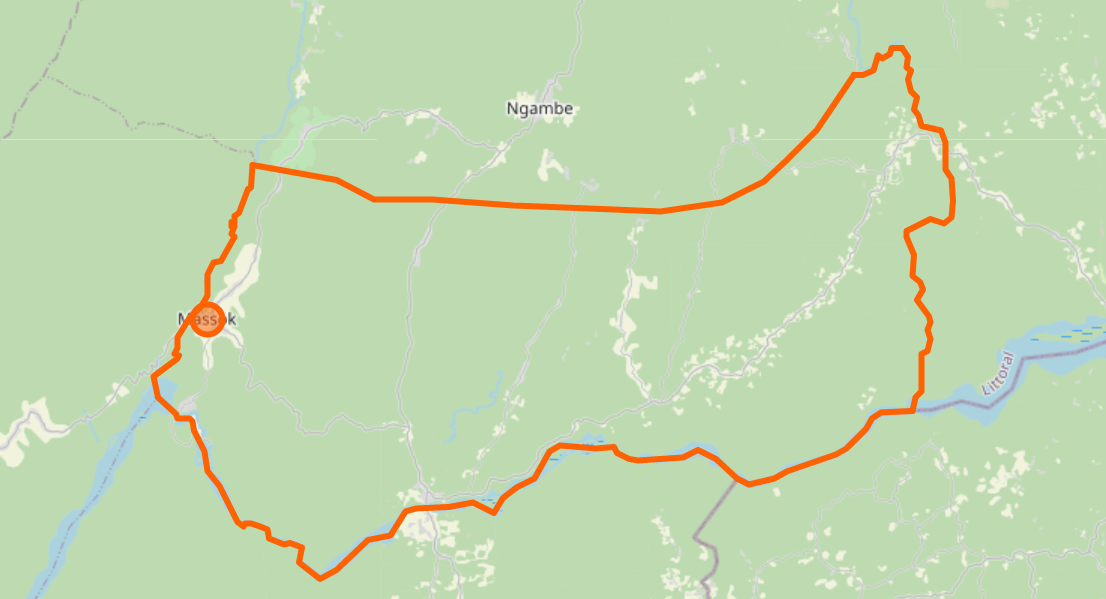
- Communal limits of Massock

- Location in Cameroon
- Coordinates: 4°8′00″N 10°28′00″E
- Country: Cameroon
- Region: Littoral
- Department: Sanaga-Maritime
- Time zone: UTC+1 (WAT)

Massock is a town and commune in Littoral Region, Cameroon.

== See also ==
- Communes of Cameroon
