= Mouanko =

- Commune and town
- Location in Cameroon
- Coordinates: 3°38′N 9°47′E
- Country: Cameroon
- Time zone: UTC+1 (WAT)

Mouanko is a town and commune in the Littoral Region of Cameroon, lying on the north bank of the Sanaga River. It is the main town of the Douala Edéa Wildlife Reserve.

== See also ==
- Communes of Cameroon
