= Edea Hydroelectric Power Station =

Hydroelectric power plant of the Sanaga River in Edéa, Cameroon

Edea Power Station
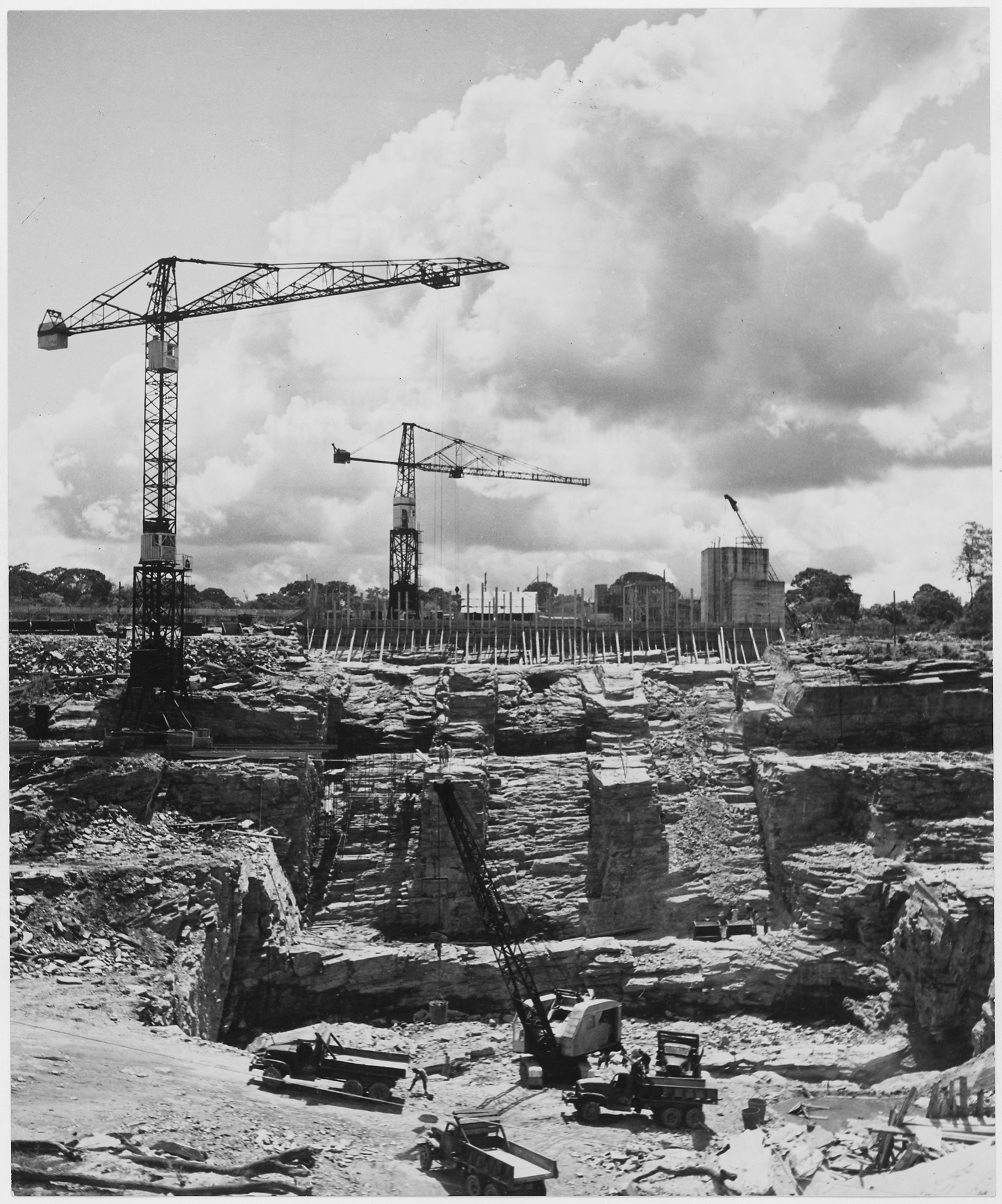
- Country: Cameroon
- Location: Cameroon
- Coordinates: 3°48′46″N 10°07′41″E
- Status: Operational
- Commission date: 1953

Thermal power station
- Primary fuel: Hydropower

Power generation
- Nameplate capacity: 264 MW (354,000 hp)
- Annual net output: 1,762.9 GWh (2016); 1,951 GWh (2017)

External links
- Commons: Related media on Commons

The Edea Power Station is a hydroelectric power plant of the Sanaga River near Edéa in Cameroon. It has a power generating capacity of 264 megawatts (354,000 hp), enough to power over 136,600 homes. Nearly 60% of the power goes to the aluminum smelter.

== See also ==
- List of power stations in Cameroon
- List of power stations in Africa
