= Chollet Hydroelectric Power Station =

Hydroelectric power station in central Africa

- Map of Cameroon showing the location of Chollet Dam. Chollet Hydroelectric Power Station (Africa) Chollet Hydroelectric Power Station (Earth)
- Country: Cameroon
- Coordinates: 02°00′48″N 15°00′07″E
- Purpose: Power
- Status: Under construction
- Opening date: 2027 Expected
- Construction cost: US$700 million
- Owners: Government of Cameroon & Government of the Republic of the Congo

Dam and spillways
- Impounds: Ngoko River

Power Station
- Turbines: 6 x 100 MW
- Installed capacity: 600 megawatts (800,000 hp)

Chollet Hydroelectric Power Station is a 600 megawatts (800,000 hp) hydroelectric power station under development across the Ngoko River, in Cameroon and the Republic of the Congo in Central Africa. The construction contract was awarded to China Gezhouba Group Company (CGGC), in May 2021.

== Location ==
The power station is located in southeastern Cameroon at the border with the Republic of the Congo, across the Dja River (Ngoko River). The power station is also located close to the borders of the Central African Republic and Gabon.

== Overview ==
On 28 October 2010, Cameroon and Congo signed a memorandum of understanding (MOU) to construct a 600 megawatts hydroelectric plant across the Ngoko River that runs along their common border. At that time, it was expected that each government would raise fifty percent of the construction funds. Sinohydro, the engineering and construction conglomerate was tasked to oversee the engineering, procurement, and construction (EPC).

When the concept was re-visited in October 2020, Sinohydro was dropped as the EPC contractor, because the two countries could not independently raise the money to pay for the dam, under prevailing conditions. A new model of Build, Own, Operate and Transfer (BOOT), was adopted. The Gezhouba Group was selected to undertake the task, under the new model.

== Development ==
Under the new model, the work will be carried out in there phases.

=== Phase 1 ===
This phase comprises the feasibility study, the environmental impact assessment study and related assessments. The infrastructure involved include the dam, the power station, the substations, the evacuation power lines and the related roadways in both countries.

=== Phase 2 ===
The second phase involves the actual construction of the dam, the power station and related infrastructure. Work also involves the construction of substations, high voltage power lines and access roads in both Cameroon and Congo. Indigenous staff in both countries will be trained to operate the infrastructure and sustainably manage the environment during this phase.

=== Phase 3 ===
The third phase involves the commissioning and operation of the project and the signing of the project agreement. The two governments are expected to form a special purpose vehicle company which will own and operate the power station, when the Gezhouba Group transfers it to the two governments.

== Funding ==
Under the old model in 2010, the cost of development was estimated at about US$700 million. With the new BOOT model in 2021, estimated costs have escalated to as high as US$1.2 billion.

== See also ==
- List of power stations in Cameroon
- List of power stations in the Republic of the Congo
