= Ndom, Cameroon =

Ndom
- Commune and town
- Interactive map of Ndom
- Coordinates: 4°23′39″N 10°49′08″E
- Country: Cameroon
- Region: Littoral
- Department: Sanaga-Maritime

Population (2005)
  - Total: 10,340
- Time zone: UTC+1 (WAT)

Ndom is a town and commune in the Sanaga-Maritime department, Littoral Region of Cameroon. As of 2005 census, it had a population of 10,340.

== See also ==
- Communes of Cameroon
