= Dibamba =

Coordinates: 4.1333°N 10.1000°E

- Commune and town
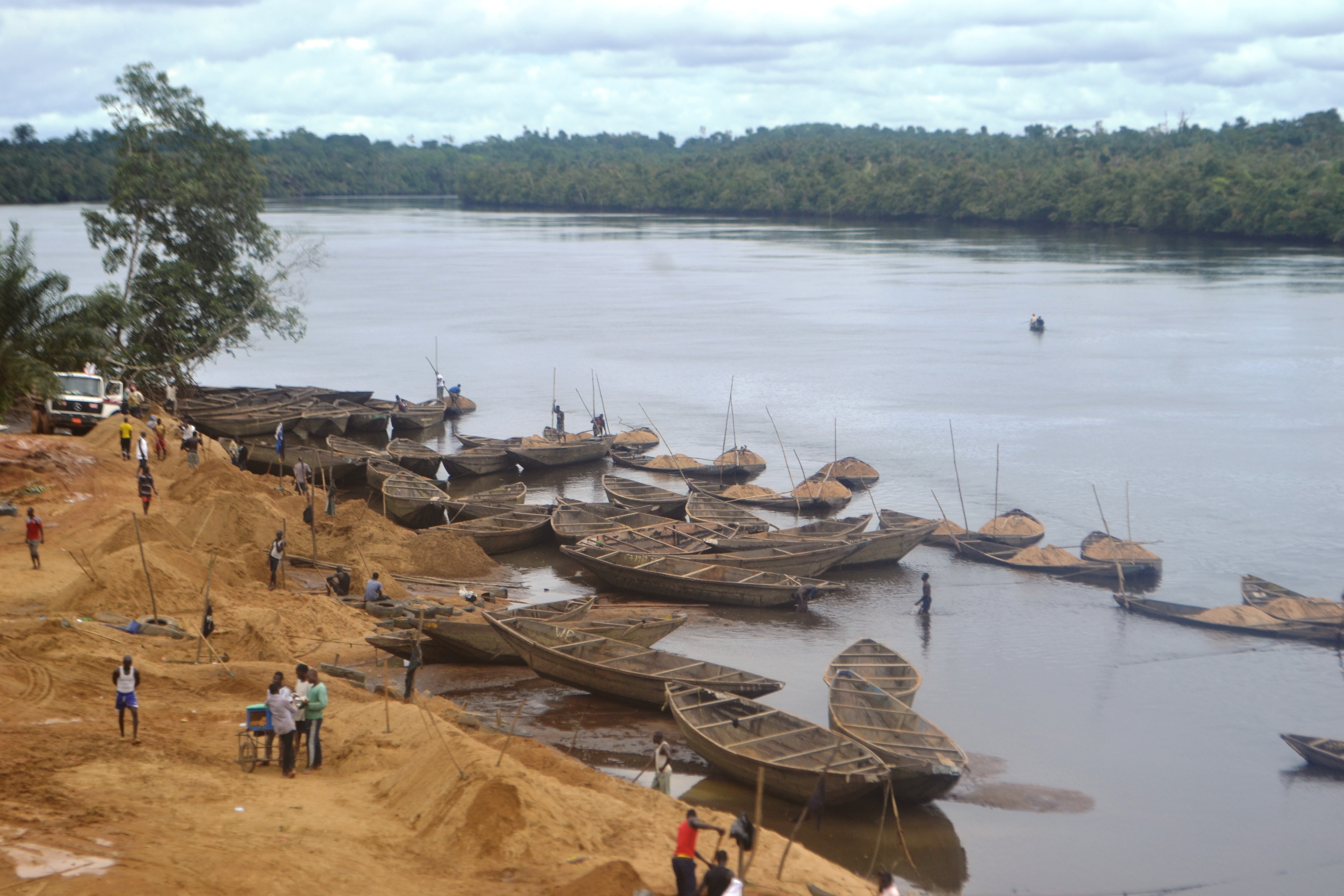
- Sand quarry.
- Interactive map of Dibamba
- Country: Cameroon
- Time zone: UTC+1 (WAT)

Dibamba is a town and commune in Cameroon.

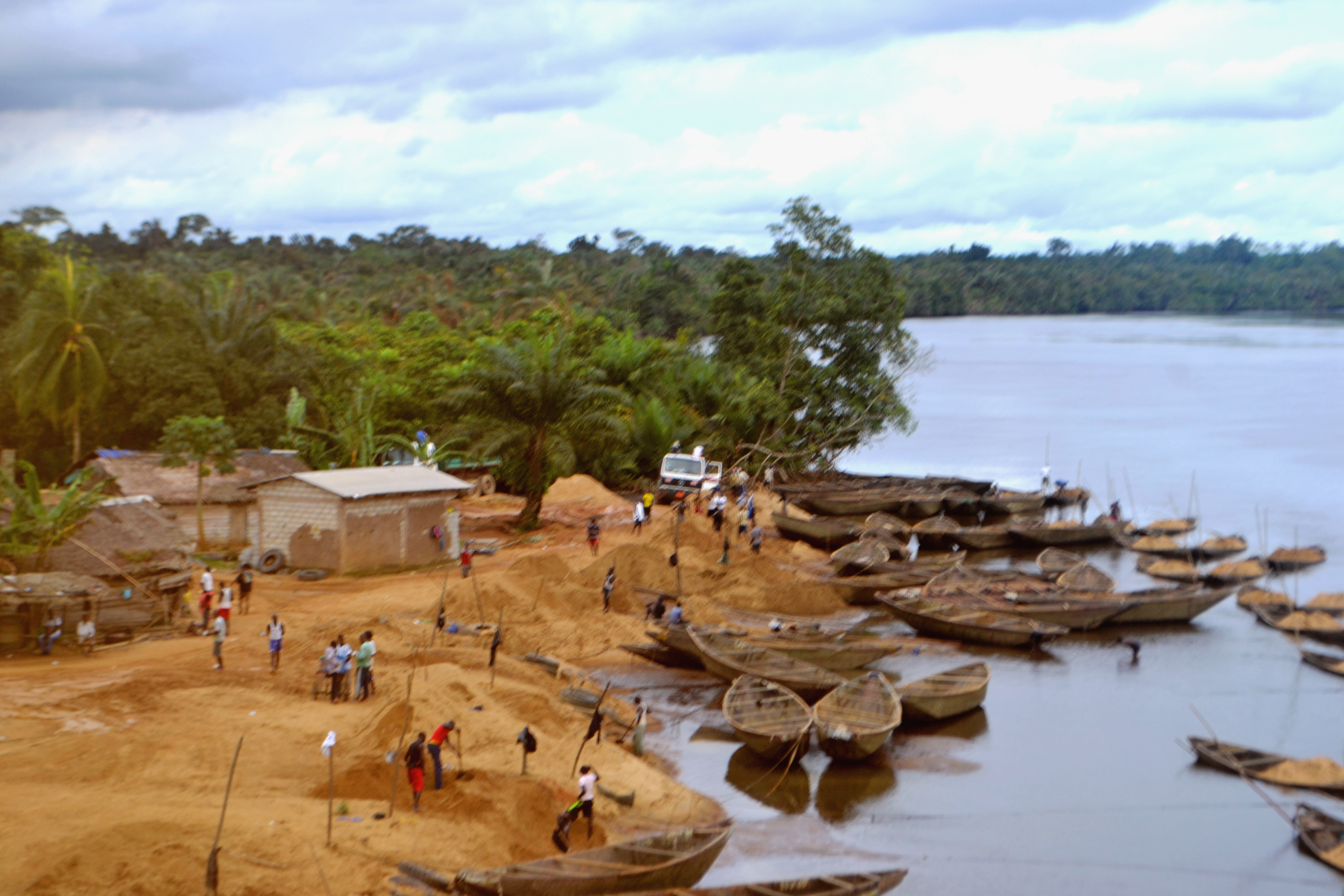
Village near sand quarry

== See also ==
- Communes of Cameroon
