= Nyanon =

Coordinates: 4°16′N 10°57′E

- Commune and town
- Interactive map of Nyanon
- Country: Cameroon
- Time zone: UTC+1 (WAT)

Nyanon is a town and commune in Cameroon.

== Villages ==
- Nyakélé

== See also ==
- Communes of Cameroon
