= List of power stations in Cameroon =

This article lists all power stations in Cameroon.

== Hydroelectric ==
Hydroelectric station	Community	Coordinates	Type	River	Reservoir	Capacity (MW)	Year completed
Mbakaou Hydroelectric Power Station	Tibati		Run-of-the-river	Djérem River		1.480	2021
Grand Eweng				Sanaga River		1,000	Planned
Chollet Hydroelectric Power Station	Border with the Republic of the Congo	02°00′48″N 15°00′07″E		Dja River		600	Planned
Nachtigal Hydroelectric Power Station		6°18'17.0"N 12°48'31.0"E				420	2024
Song Loulou Power Station		04°04′41″N 10°27′54″E	Run-of-the-river	Sanaga River	Song Loulou Reservoir	384	1981 & 1988
Edea Power Station	Edéa	03°48′46″N 10°07′40″E	Run-of-the-river	Sanaga River	Edea Reservoir	264	1953
Memve'ele Power Station	Nyabessan	02°23′47″N 10°23′56″E	Reservoir	Ntem River	Memve'ele Reservoir	201	Under construction
Lagdo Power Station	Lagdo	09°03′36″N 13°41′17″E	Reservoir	Benue River	Lagdo Reservoir	72	1982
Lom Pangar Dam		05°23′01″N 13°30′09″E	Reservoir	Lom River		30	Under construction
Mekin Power Station				Dja River		15	2016

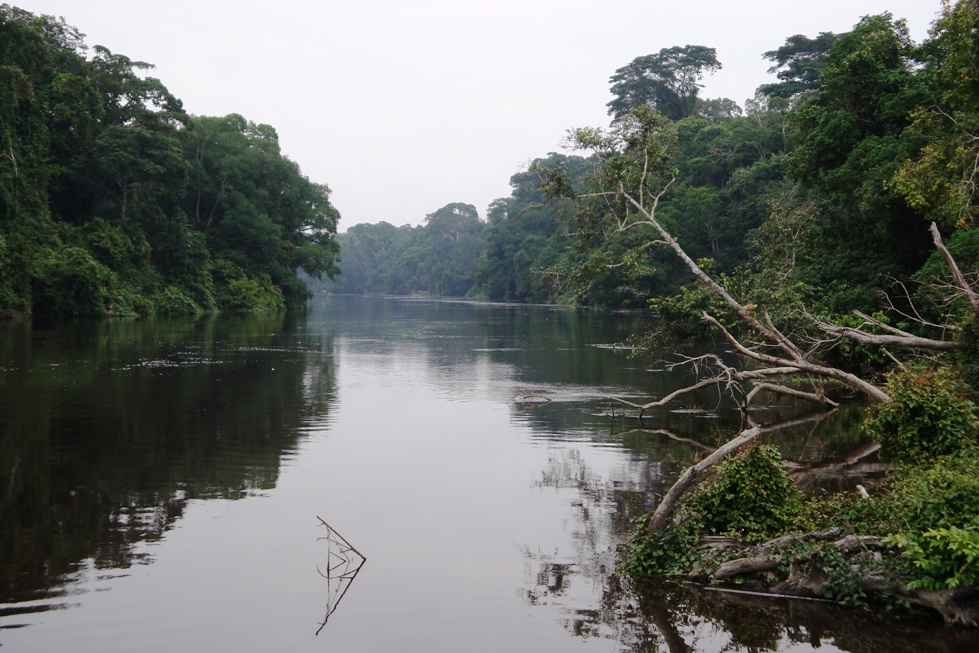
Dja River

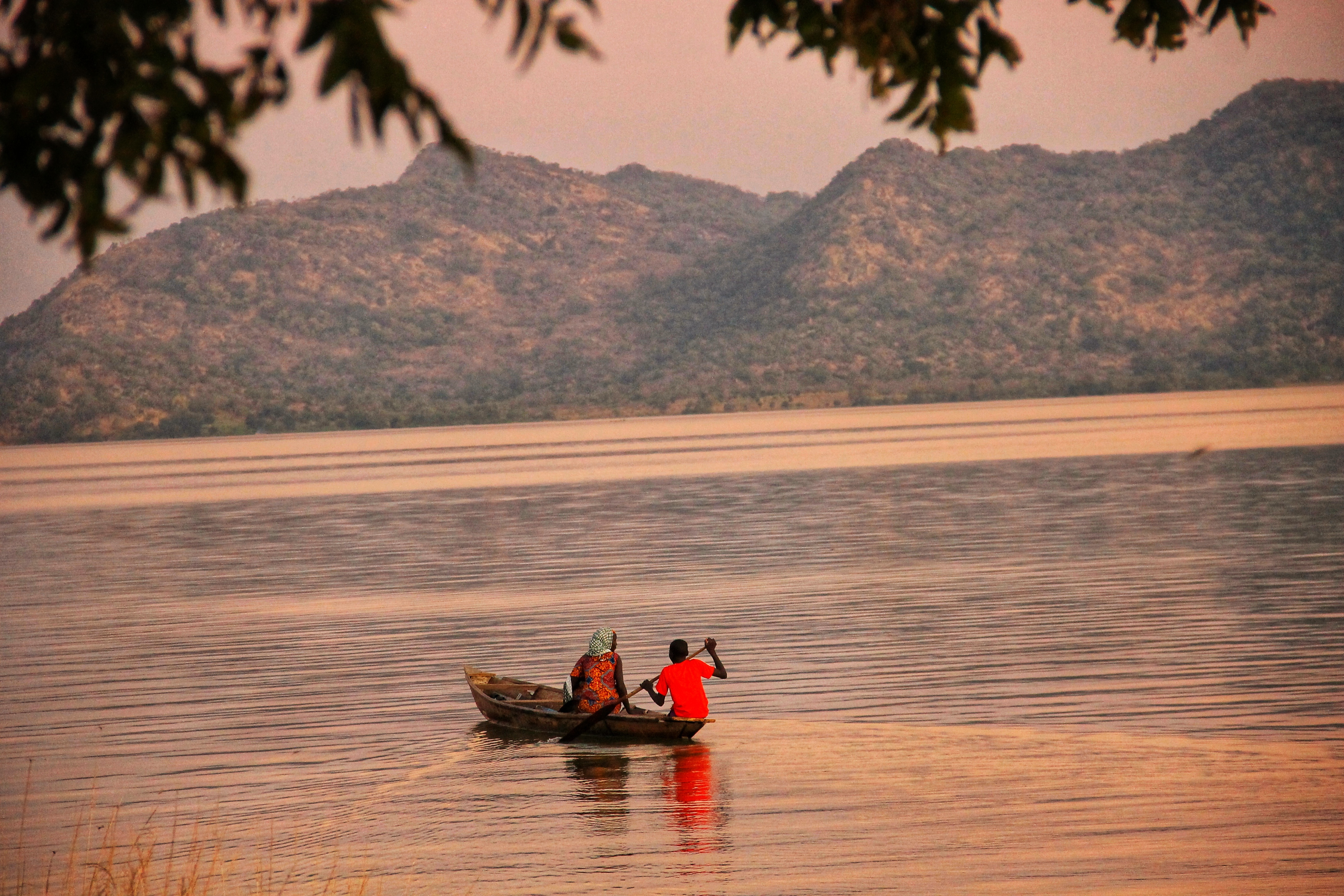
Benue River

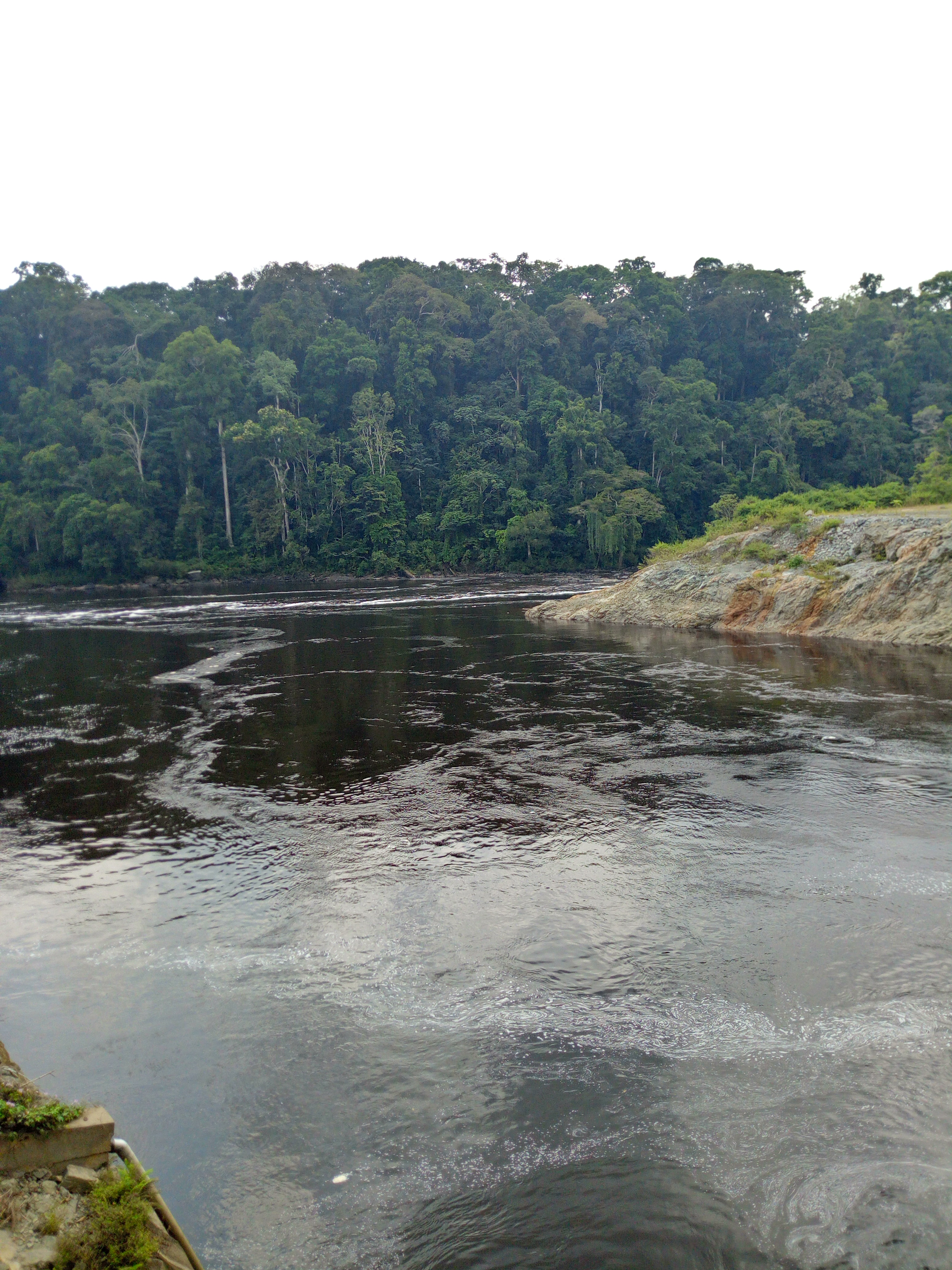
Ntem River

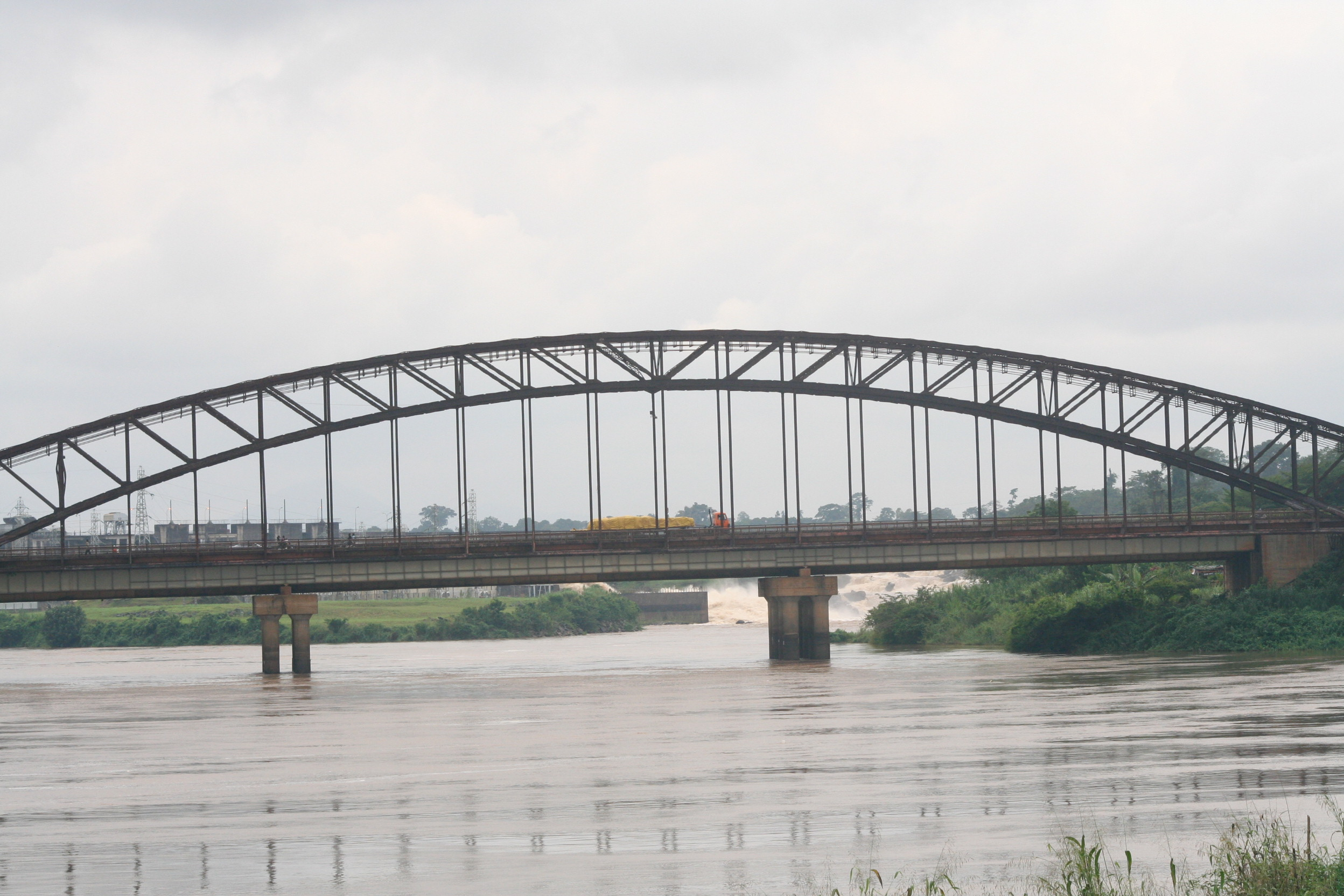
Sanaga River from Edea

== Thermal ==
Thermal power station	Community	Coordinates	Fuel type	Capacity (MW)	Year completed	Owner
Kribi Power Station	Mpolongwe, Kribi	3.0100°N 9.9600°E	Natural gas	216	2013	Actis
Douala			Oil	88		
Limbe			Oil	85		
Yaoundé			Oil	60		
Ebolowa			Oil	10		
Mbalmayo			Oil	10		

== See also ==
- List of power stations in Africa
- List of largest power stations in the world
