= Ngovayang =

Mining site in Cameroon

Coordinates: 3°15′0″N 10°37′0″E

Ngovayang is an iron ore mining site in the department of Océan, South Region, Cameroon. It is controlled by the Indian company Jindal Steel and Power.

== History ==
In November 2013, the Australian company Legend Mining sold the Ngovayang exploitation to the Indian company Jindal Steel and Power. The deal was sealed in August 2014.

== Transport ==
The Ngovayang mining lease straddles the main metre gauge Cameroon Railways.

== Ports ==
The port of Douala on the existing metre gauge line has draft of only 8.5m, whereas the proposed more southerly port of Kribi has a draft of 20m, assuming that it were available on an open access basis. Indeed, an agreement was signed between Sundance Resources and Legend Mining to this effect.

== See also ==
- Iron ore in Africa
- Railway stations in Cameroon
