= Dizangué =

Coordinates: 3°46′N 9°59′E

- Commune and town
- Interactive map of Dizangué
- Country: Cameroon
- Time zone: UTC+1 (WAT)

Dizangué is a town and commune in Cameroon.

== See also ==
- Communes of Cameroon
