= Song Loulou Hydroelectric Power Station =

Dam on the Sanaga river in Cameroon

Song Loulou Power Station
- Country: Cameroon
- Location: Cameroon
- Coordinates: 4°04′41″N 10°27′54″E
- Status: Operational
- Commission date: 1981
- Operator: Electricity Development Corporation

Thermal power station
- Primary fuel: Hydropower

Power generation
- Nameplate capacity: 384 MW (515,000 hp)
- Capacity factor: 84 %
- Annual net output: 2,660.8 GWh (2016); 2,796 GWh (2018); 2,833.6 GWh (2017)

The Song Loulou Power Station is a hydroelectric power plant of the Sanaga River in Cameroon. It has a power generating capacity of 384 megawatts (515,000 hp), enough to power over 257,100 homes. The Song Loulou power station is built upstream of another power station; the Edea power station. Unlike the Edea power station that mainly powers the aluminum smelter located next to it, the Song Loulou power station mainly powers homes and other industrial plants in the south of the country.

== See also ==
- List of power stations in Cameroon
- List of power stations in Africa
