= Yaouba Abdoulaye =

Minister Delegate to the Minister of Finance of Cameroon
- Incumbent
- Assumed office 2018

Personal details
- Born: 1958 (age 66–67) Maroua, Far North Region, Cameroon
- Party: CPDM

Yaouba Abdoulaye is a Cameroonian engineer and politician serving as the minister delegate to the minister of finance of Cameroon since 2018.

== Biography ==
Abdoulaye was born in 1958 in Maroua, Far North Region, Cameroon. He attended the National Higher School for Agronomy (ENSA) in Yaoundé where he obtained a degree in engineering and a minor in economics, graduating in 1984. In 2001, he left Cameroon for France and studied at the Forhom Institute in La Rochelle, where he worked on a development project.

Abdoulaye began his professional career in the Ministry of Agriculture. In 1984, he was appointed department delegate for Vina, in Ngaoundéré. After that, he served as the director general of the Mandara Mountains Integrated Development Mission from 1987 to 2006. Abdoulaye entered the Cameroonian government as deputy minister to the minister of state, minister of planning, programming, development, and territorial development (MINPLAPDAT). In 2009, Abdoulaye attended a conference in Rome to strengthen economic cooperation between Italy and Africa. On March 2, 2018, he was appointed minister delegate to the minister of finance.

Abdoulaye is a member of the ruling Cameroon People's Democratic Movement (CPDM) political party, and a member of the central committee of CPDM. He was appointed a member of the CPDM's permanent delegation to Diamaré in the 2020 Cameroonian parliamentary election. Abdoulaye is married and the father of six children.
