= Ngwei =

Coordinates: 4.2500°N 10.7000°E

- Commune and town
- Interactive map of Ngwei
- Country: Cameroon
- Time zone: UTC+1 (WAT)

Ngwei is a town and commune in Cameroon.

== See also ==
- Communes of Cameroon
