= Carl Heinrich Zimmermann =

German military officer (1864–1949)

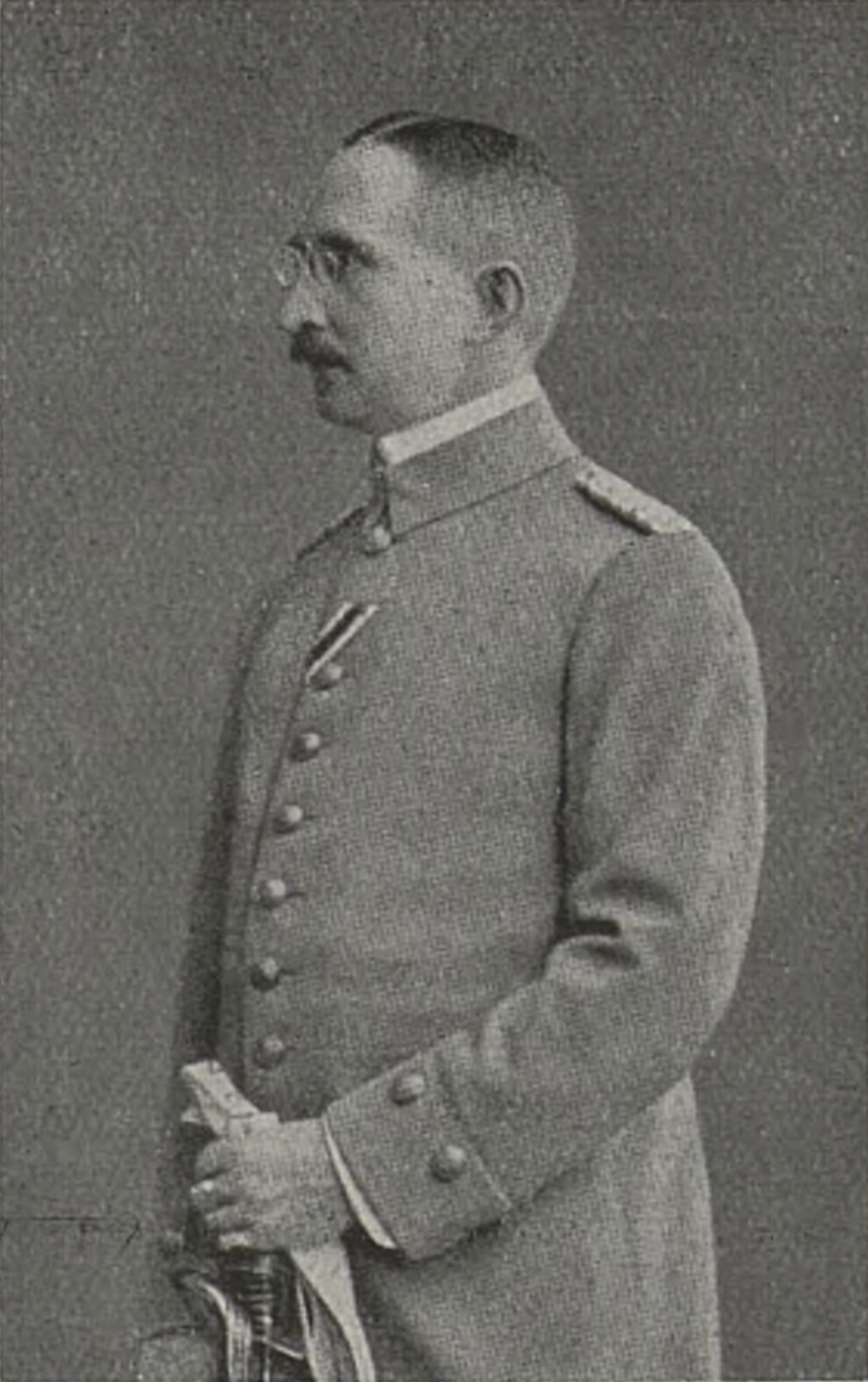
- Born: September 7, 1864; Frankenau, Kingdom of Prussia
- Died: January 13, 1949 (aged 84) Allied-occupied Germany
- Allegiance: German Empire; Weimar Republic
- Branch: Imperial German Army; Reichsheer
- Service years: 1883–1920
- Rank: Oberst char. Generalmajor
- Commands: Schutztruppe of Kamerun
- Conflicts: First World War: Kamerun campaign

Carl Heinrich Zimmermann (7 September 1864 – 13 January 1949), was a German military officer and last commander of the Schutztruppe in German Kamerun.

== Life ==
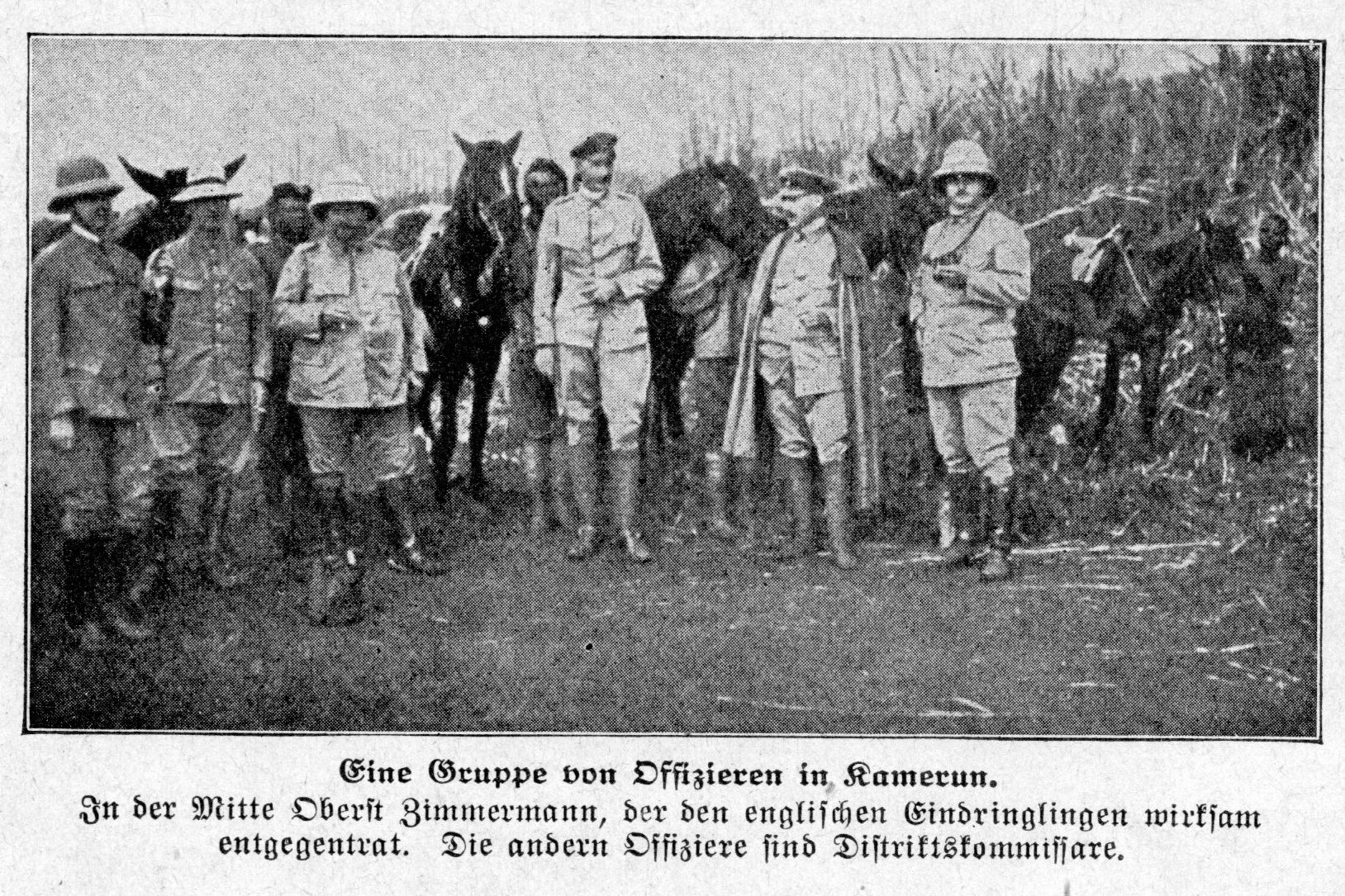
German troops in Cameroon (Zimmerman in the centre)

He served as military instructor in the Chilean Army between 1895 and 1897. In 1900 he was sent to serve in the Schutztruppe in Kamerun, of which he became the commander in 1909. It was in this function that he directed the military operations against a Franco-British-Belgian invasion of Kamerun, after the outbreak of the First World War. By 1916, the situation was so desperate that Zimmermann and his troops had to flee to neutral Spanish Río Muni, where they were interned and eventually sent to a detention center near Zaragoza. After his return to Germany he served shortly in the Reichswehr and retired in 1920 as Generalmajor.

== See also ==
- Kamerun campaign
