= Edéa =

- City and commune
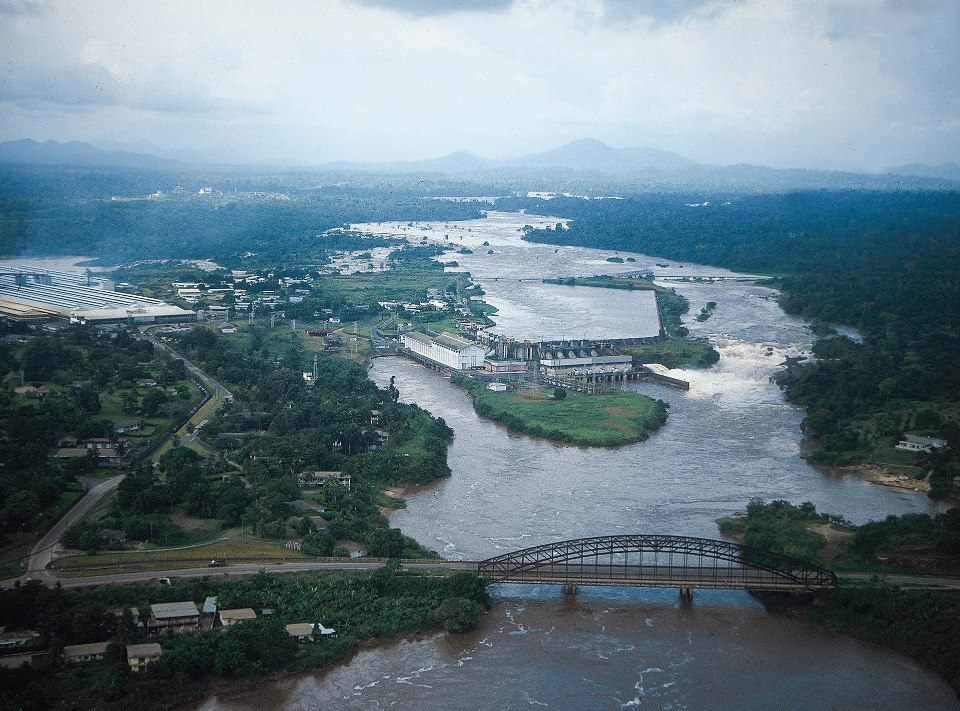
- Edéa in 2013

- Location in Cameroon
- Coordinates: 3°48′N 10°8′E
- Country: Cameroon
- Province: Littoral Province
- Founded: 1891

Area
  - Total: 180 km^{2} (69 sq mi)
- Elevation: 35 m (115 ft)

Population (2012)
  - Total: 73,128
  - Density: 410/km^{2} (1,100/sq mi)

Edéa (German: Marienberg, though this was the colonial name) is a city and commune in the Littoral Region of Cameroon. Situated on the Sanaga River, it lies on the Douala–Yaoundé–Ngaoundéré railway line. Its population was estimated at 122,300 in 2001.

== History ==
During World War I, the First Battle of Edea took place from 20 to 26 October 1914 in and around Edéa, and ended in an Allied victory. The Second Battle of Edea, in 1915, also ended in an Allied victory.

== Economy ==
Edéa is powered by the Edea Hydroelectric Power Station.

=== Agriculture ===
A primarily agricultural economy, Edéa's main product is palm oil. In 2015, Yaouba Abdoulaye funded the local government FCFA$612,000,000 to build processing plants. Palm oil company Socapalm has operated a 3,712-hectare (37.12 km^{2}) palm oil planation in Edéa since 1969, on a lease which was supposed to end in 2000. On 25 March 2025, members of the Association of Women Residents of Socapalm-Édéa (AFRISE; abbreviated from French name)—a local organization against Socapalm—protested to stop the company from replanting and were tear-gassed by local police.

Edéa is also situated near Douala Edéa National Park.

== Transportation ==
Edéa is served by Camrail. In September 2007, a metre gauge branch railway to the ocean port of Kribi was proposed, on account of it having deeper water than the river port of Douala. In August 2020, Camrail completed improvements on several nearby railway bridges. In September 2021, the Cameroonian government gathered investors to fund 291 kilometers of railway construction, part of which running through Edéa.

Cameroon National Highway 7 begins in Edéa, ending in Kribi.

== Notable people ==
- Ruben Boumtje-Boumtje (born 1978), basketball player
- Maximilienne Ngo Mbe (born 1972), human rights campaigner

== See also ==
- Roman Catholic Diocese of Edéa
