= Sanaga River =

Longest river in Cameroon

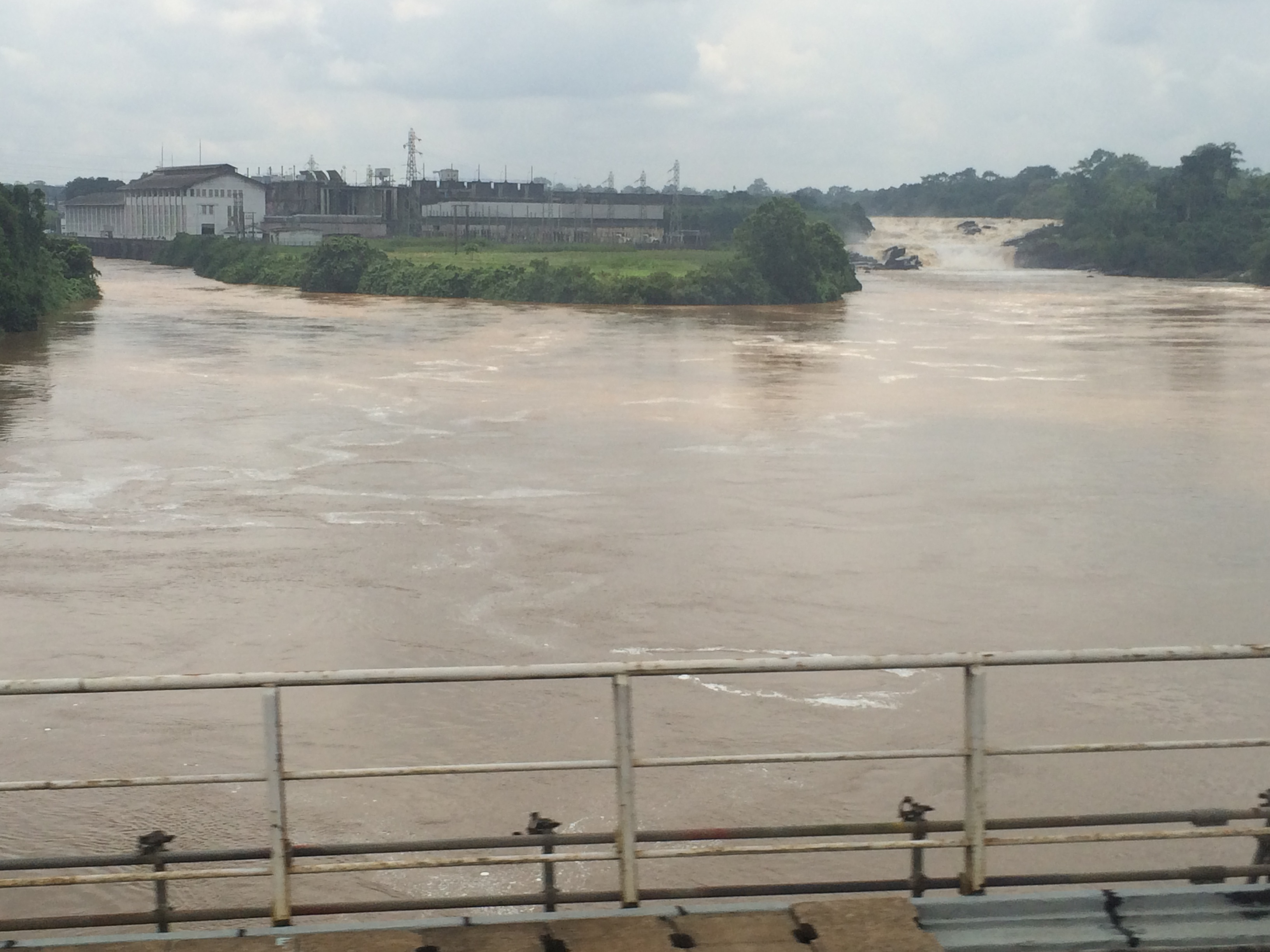
- The Sanaga River after the Edea Hydroelectric Power Station

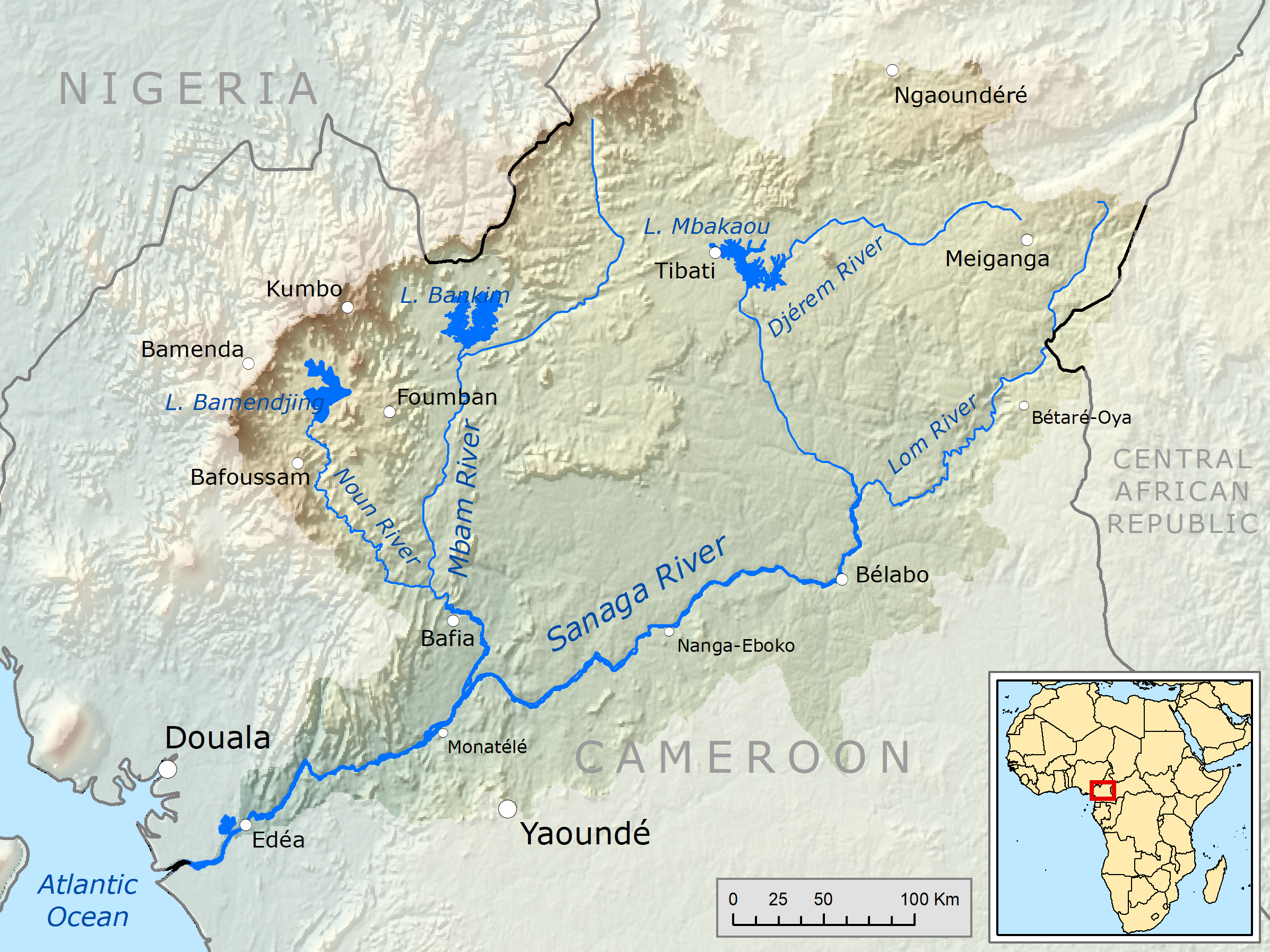
- Map of the Sanaga River drainage basin

Location
- Country: Cameroon
- Regions: East Region, Centre Region, Littoral Region
- Cities: Edéa, Nanga Eboko, Bélabo

Physical characteristics
- Source: Confluence of Djérem River and Lom River
  - coordinates: 5.323772°N 13.397769°E
  - elevation: 628 m (2,060 ft)
- Mouth: Bight of Biafra
  - coordinates: 3.559338°N 9.652175°E
  - elevation: 0 m
- Length: 603 km (375 mi), with Djérem River 1,067.5 km (663.3 mi)
- Basin size: 132,990 km^{2} (51,350 mi^{2})
- Discharge
  - location: Edéa
  - average: 1,985 m^{3}/s (70,100 cu ft/s)
  - minimum: 234 m^{3}/s (8,300 cu ft/s)
  - maximum: 6,950 m^{3}/s (245,000 cu ft/s)
- Discharge
  - location: Bight of Biafra, Cameroon (near mouth)
  - average: 2,072 m^{3}/s (73,200 cu ft/s)
  - minimum: 473 m^{3}/s (16,700 cu ft/s)
  - maximum: 5,700 m^{3}/s (200,000 cu ft/s)

Basin features
- River system: Sanaga River
- Tributaries
  - left: Long River, Tete River, Sele River, Mfam River, Ngoba River
  - right: Mbam River, Mbuku River, Ligene River, Djam River, Dorong River, Jape River, Uem River
- Waterbodies: Song Loulou Hydroelectric Power Station, Edea Hydroelectric Power Station
- Bridges: Japoma Bridge

The Sanaga River (formerly German: Zannaga) is the largest river in Cameroon located in East Region, Centre Region and Littoral Region. Its length is about 603 km (375 mi) from the confluence of Djérem and Lom River. The total length of Sanaga-Djérem River system is about 1,067.5 km (663.3 mi). Djérem is the longest source of Sanaga River with a total length of 464.5 km.

== Course ==
The Sanaga River has its source at the Adamawa Plateau. It is formed by the confluence of the Djérem and Lom Rivers in the north of the East Region. Djérem River has a total length of 464.5 km (288.6 mi) and Lom River a total length of 424.2 km (263.6 mi). Apart from these originating rivers, the largest tributary of the Sanaga is Mbam River with a total length of 548 km (341 mi).

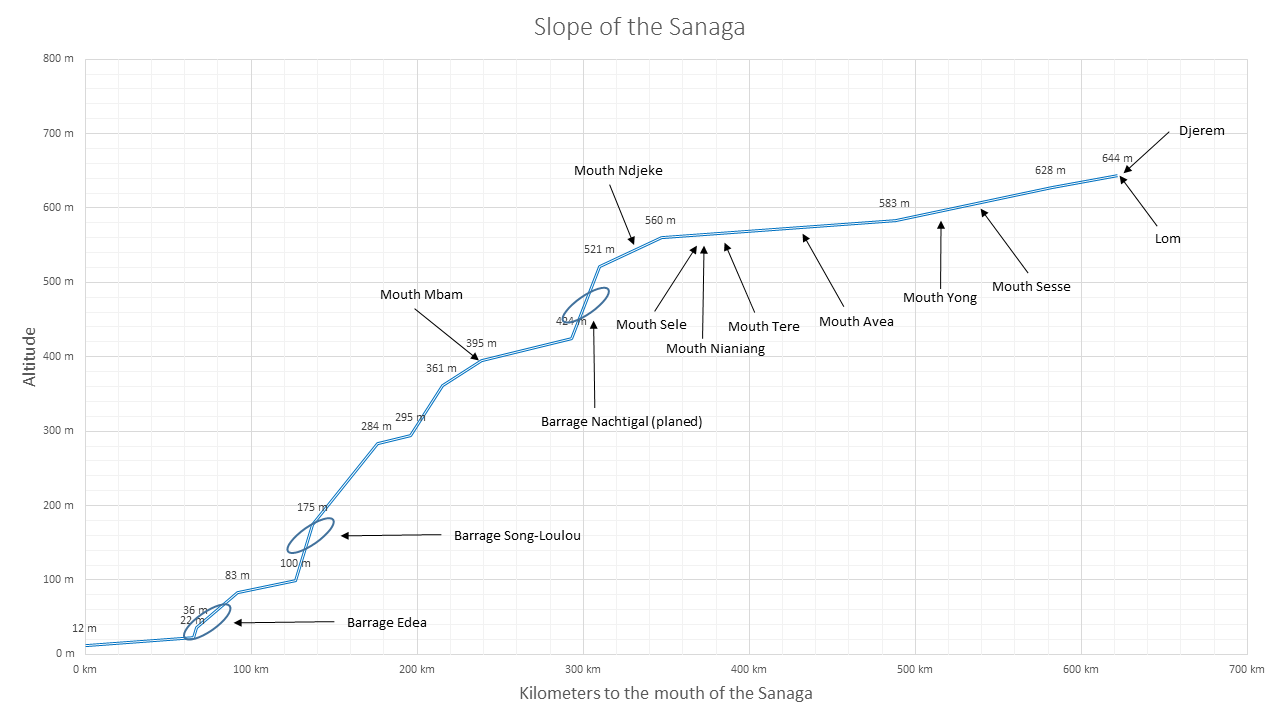
Slope of Sanaga River

== Climate ==
The Sanaga River forms a boundary between two tropical moist forest ecoregions. The Cross-Sanaga-Bioko coastal forests lie to the north between the Sanaga River and the Cross River of Nigeria, and the Atlantic Equatorial coastal forests extend south of the river through southwestern Cameroon and Equatorial Guinea, Gabon, the Republic of the Congo, Cabinda and the Democratic Republic of the Congo.

== Hydrology ==
The flow of the river was measured at Edéa in m^{3}/s:

View chart definition.

== Dams and reservoirs ==
Beginning at the headwaters, there are 2 dams on the Sanaga River:

Dam	Nameplate capacity (MW)	Reservoir	Surface area (km^{2})	Total capacity (million m^{3})
Song Loulou	384			10
Edea	264			

== Transport ==
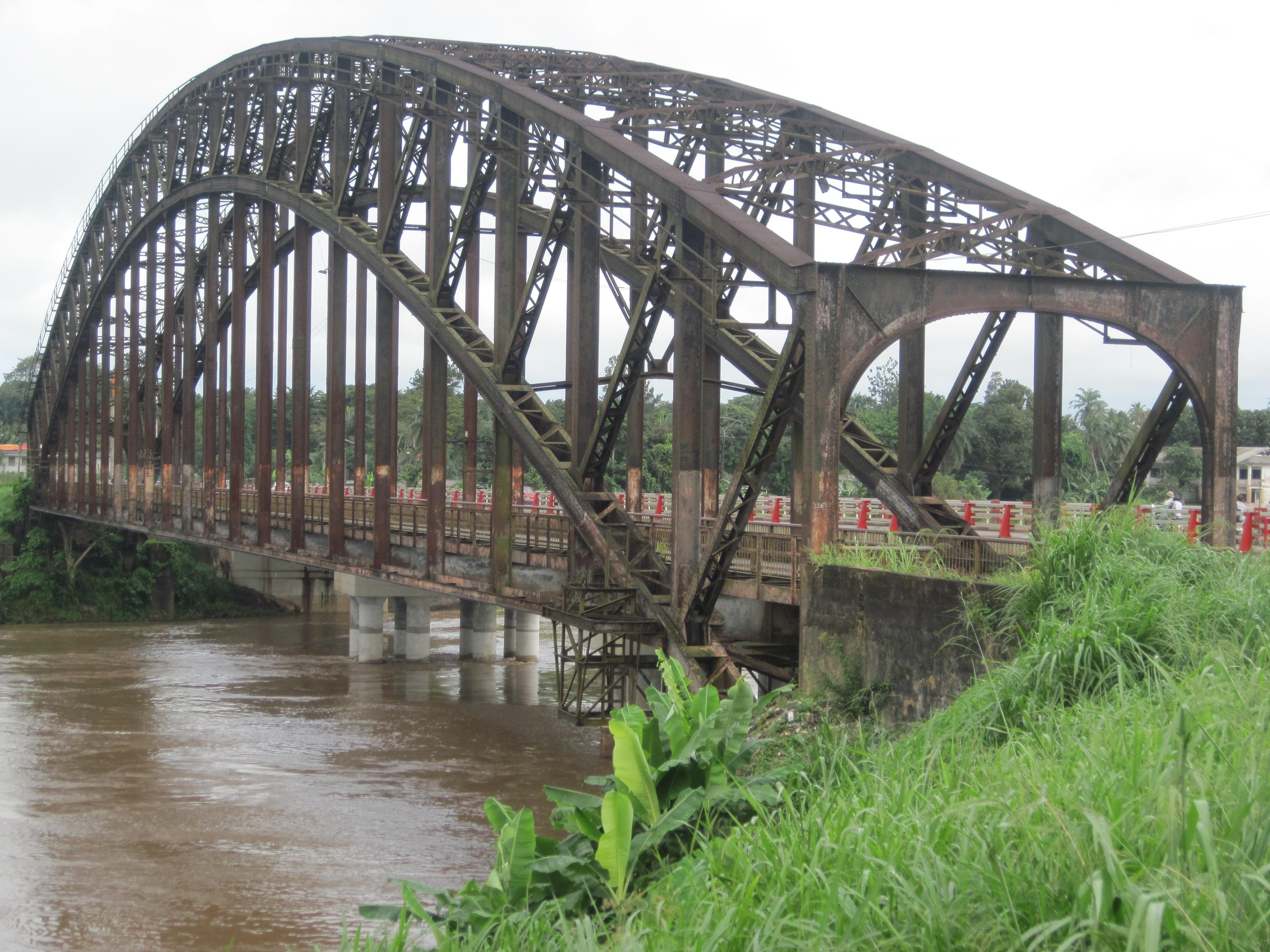
Edea bridge on the Sanaga

- The Camrail railway bridges the Sanaga River at Edea.

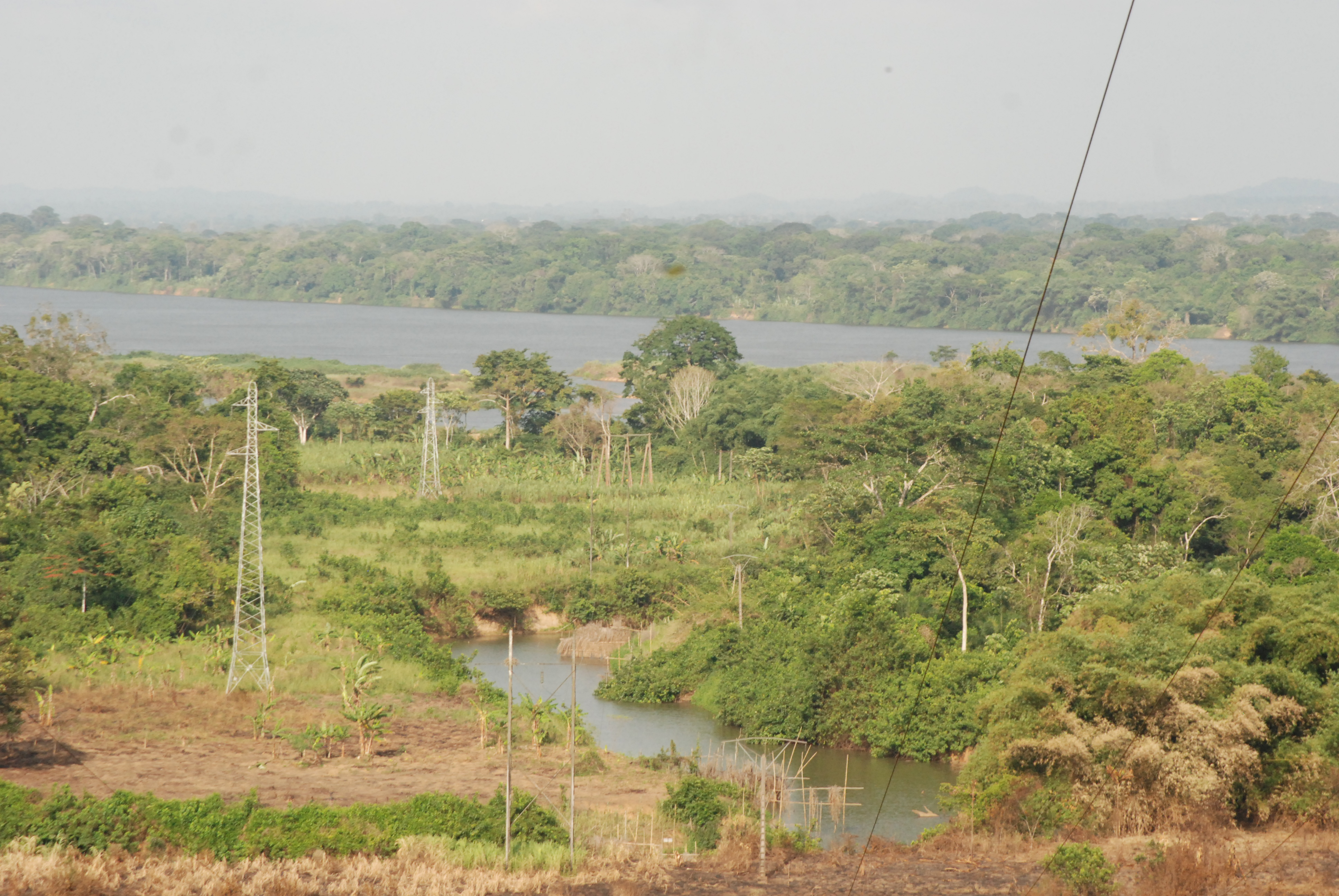
Forest around the Sanaga River

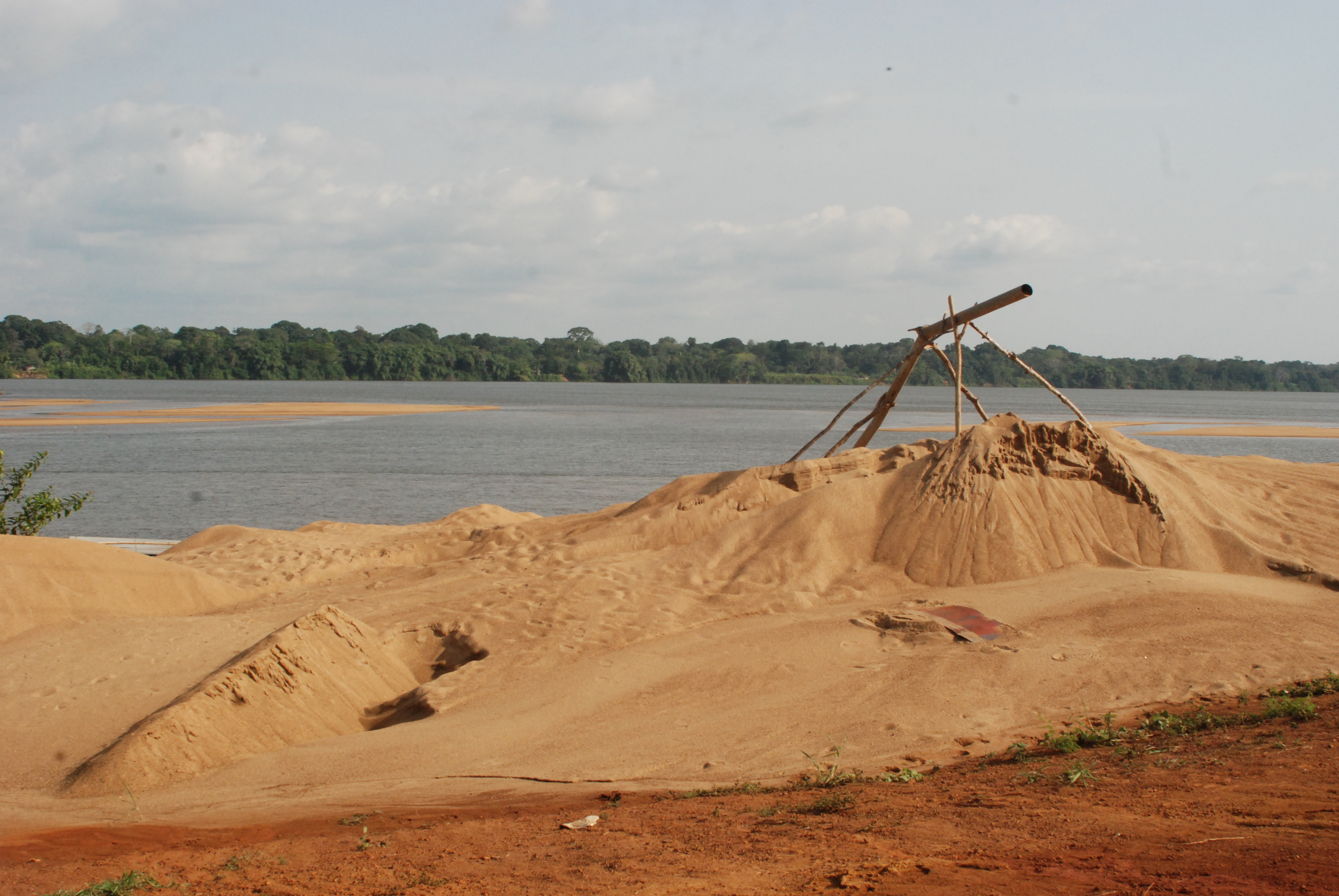
Around the Sanaga River

== Biodiversity and conservation ==
The Sanaga River supports one of Central Africa's richest freshwater ecosystems and contains numerous endemic fish species that are restricted to the Sanaga basin. The river also provides habitat for freshwater molluscs, aquatic plants, and migratory bird species associated with riparian wetlands.

Hydroelectric development has modified sections of the river, particularly through the construction of dams such as Edéa, Song Loulou, Lom Pangar, and Nachtigal. While these projects contribute substantially to Cameroon's electricity production, they have also raised concerns regarding fish migration, sediment transport, and ecological connectivity.

Conservation efforts increasingly focus on balancing hydropower production with environmental flow management and the protection of aquatic biodiversity throughout the Sanaga basin.
