= Music of Cameroon =

The music of the Cameroon includes diverse traditional and modern musical genres. The best-known contemporary genre is makossa, a popular style that has gained fans across Africa, and its related dance craze bikutsi.

The pirogue sailors of Douala are known for a kind of singing called "Ngoso" which has evolved into a kind of modern music accompanied by zanza, balafon, and various percussion instruments.

== Traditional music ==
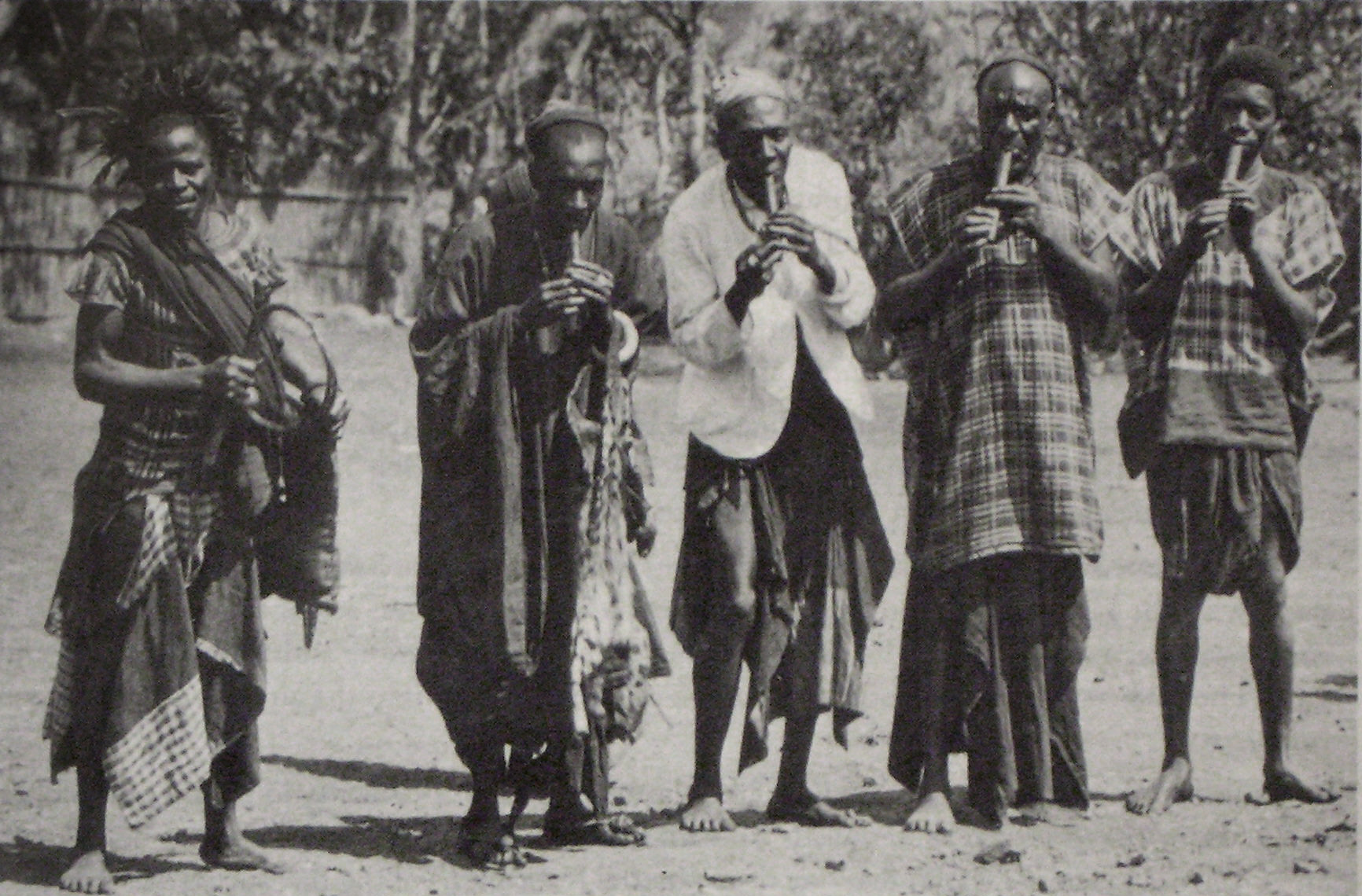
Lela celebrations in Bali, Cameroon, around 1908. Four men play on holy lela flutes. The celebrations are directed by members of the Bali royal family.

Music for the Lela celebration
Wax cylinder recording of lela flute playing, 1908.

The ethnicities of Cameroon include an estimated 250 distinct ethnic groups in five regional-cultural divisions. An estimated 38% of the population are Western highlanders–Semi-Bantu or grassfielders including the Bamileke, Bamum, and many smaller Tikar groups in the northwest. 12% are coastal tropical forest peoples, including the Bassa, Duala, and many smaller groups in the southwest. The southern tropical forest peoples (18%) include the Beti-Pahuin and their sub-groups the Bulu and Fang, the Maka and Njem, as well as, the Baka pygmies. In the semi-arid northern regions (the Sahel) and central highlands the Fulani (French: Peul or Peuhl; Fula: Fulɓe) form an estimated 14% of Cameroonians, while the Kirdi (unbelievers) are a general category, comprising 18% of the population, of various mainly Chadic and Adamawa speakers.

=== Beti ===
The Beti, or Ewondo, live in the area around Yaoundé and south into Equatorial Guinea. They are best known for bikutsi music, which has been popularized and become a rival for the more urban and accessible makossa of Douala. The name can be loosely translated as beating the ground continuously. Bikutsi, characterized by an intense 6/8 rhythm, is played at Beti gatherings including parties, funerals, and weddings.

Beti gatherings fall into two major categories:

- Ekang phase: the time when imaginary, mythological, and spiritual issues are discussed
- Bikutsi phase: when real-life issues are discussed

A double-sided harp with calabash amplification called the mvet is used during these ceremonies by Beti storytellers, who are viewed as using the mvet as an instrument of God to educate the people. The Ekang phase is intensely musical and usually lasts all night. There are poetic recitations accompanied by clapping and dancing, with interludes for improvised and sometimes obscene performances on the balafon (a type of xylophone). These interludes signal the shift to the bikutsi phase which is much less strictly structured than Ekang. During bikutsi, women dance and sing along with the balafon, and lyrics focus on real-life problems, as well as sexual fantasies.

These female choruses are an integral part of bikutsi, and their intense dancing and screams are characteristic of the genre. Another type of ceremony is the mevungu, when women dance all night to abstain from sex during those hours for a period of nine days. The sso ritual is much-feared by Beti boys as it involves a series of tests to mark a boy's passage into manhood.

== Modern popular music ==
The earliest recorded popular music from Cameroon comes from the 1930s, when the most popular styles were imported pop music and French-style chanson. In Douala, the most developed city in Cameroon, accordions and ambasse bey music were common, with performers like Lobe Lobe, Ebanda Manfred, and Nelle Eyoum finding a local audience. Ekambi Brillant and the first major Cameroonian hit, "N'Gon Abo," set the stage for the development of makossa. Post-independence in 1960, a local variant on palm wine music called assiko, was popular especially Jean Bikoko and Dikoume Bernard.

The urbanization of Cameroon has had a major influence on the country's music. Migration to the city of Yaoundé, for example, was a major cause for the popularization of bikutsi music. During the 1950s, bars sprang up across the city to accommodate the influx of new inhabitants and soon became a symbol for Cameroonian identity in the face of colonialism. Balafon orchestras, consisting of 3-5 balafons and various percussion instruments (including the balafon, which is both a harmonic and percussive instrument) became common in the bars. Some of these orchestras, such as Richard Band de Zoetele, became quite popular in spite of scorn from the European elite.

=== 1950s and 60s ===
The middle of the 20th century saw the popularization of a native folk music called bikutsi. Bikutsi is based on a war rhythm played with various rattles and drums and xylophone. Sung by women, bikutsi featured sexually explicit lyrics and songs about everyday problems. In a popularized form, bikutsi gained mainstream success in the 1950s. Anne-Marie Nzié was perhaps the most important of the early innovators. The next bikutsi performer of legendary stature was Messi Me Nkonda Martin and his band, Los Camaroes, who added electric guitars and other new elements.

Balafon orchestras had remained popular throughout the 1950s in Yaoundé's bar scene, but the audience demanded modernity, and the popular style at the time was unable to cope. Messi Martin was a Cameroonian guitarist who had been inspired to learn the instrument by listening to Spanish language-broadcasts from neighboring Equatorial Guinea, as well as Cuban, and Zairean rumba. Messi changed the electric guitar by linking the strings together with pieces of paper, thus giving the instrument a damper tone which emitted a "thudding" sound similar to the balafon.

Messi's style was immediately popular, and his hits, like "Mengalla Maurice" and "Bekono Nga N'Konda," became radio favorites throughout the country beginning in the early 1960s. Further innovations followed, as Messi replaced the handclaps and sanza with a synthesizer and the foot-stamping 6/8 rhythm to drums.

=== 1970s ===
Later in the 1960s, modern makossa developed and became the most popular genre in Cameroon. Makossa is a type of funky dance music, best known outside Africa for Manu Dibango, whose 1972 single "Soul Makossa" was an international hit. Outside of Africa, Dibango and makossa were only briefly popular, but the genre has produced several pan-African superstars through the 1970s, 1980s and 1990s. Following Dibango, a wave of musicians electrified makossa in an attempt at making it more accessible outside of Cameroon. Another pop singer in 1970s Cameroon was André-Marie Tala, a blind singer who had a pair of hits with "Sikati" and "Potaksima."

By the 1970s, bikutsi performers like Maurice Elanga, Les Veterans, and Mbarga Soukous, added brass instruments and found controversy over pornographic lyrics. Mama Ohandja also brought bikutsi to new audiences, especially in Europe. The following decade, however, saw Les Tetes Brulées surpass previous artists in international popularity though their reaction at home was mixed. Many listeners did not like their mellow, almost easy listening-styled bikutsi. Cameroonian audiences preferred more roots-based performers like Jimmy Mvondo Mvelé and Uta Bella, both from Yaoundé.

=== 1980s ===
By the 1980s, makossa had moved to Paris and a new pop-makossa fused elements of Antillean zouk. Prominent musicians from this period included Moni Bilé, Douleur, Bébé Manga, Ben Decca, Petit-Pays, and Esa.

The 1980s also saw rapid development of Cameroon's media which saw a flourishing of both makossa and bikutsi. In 1980, L'Equipe Nationale de Makossa was formed, joining the biggest makossa stars of the period together, including, Grace Decca, Ndedi Eyango, Ben Decca, Guy Lobe, and Dina Bell. Makossa in the 1980s saw a wave of mainstream success across Africa and, to a lesser degree, abroad as Latin influences, Martinican zouk, and pop music changed its form. While makossa enjoyed international renown, bikutsi was often denigrated as the music of savages, and it did not appeal across ethnic lines and into urban areas. Musicians continued to add innovations, however, and improved recording techniques; Nkondo Si Tony, for example, added keyboards and synthesizers while Elanga Maurice added brass instruments. Les Veterans emerged as the most famous bikutsi group in the 1980s while other prominent performers included Titans de Sangmelima, Seba Georges, Ange Ebogo Emerent, Otheo and Mekongo President, who added complex harmonies and jazz influences.

In 1984, a new wave of bikutsi artists emerged, including Sala Bekono formerly of Los Camaroes, Atebass, a bassist, and Zanzibar, a guitarist who would eventually help form Les Têtes Brulées with Jean-Marie Ahanda. 1985 saw the formation of CRTV, a television network that did much to help popularize Cameroonian popular music across the country.

Jean-Marie Ahanda became the most influential bikutsi performer of the late 1980s, and he revolutionized the genre in 1987 after forming Les Têtes Brulées, whose success changed the Cameroonian music industry. The band played an extremely popular form of bikutsi that allowed for greater depth and diversity. Guitarist Zanzibar added foam rubber to the bridge of his guitar, which made the instrument sound more like a balafon than before, and was more aggressive and innovative than previous musicians. Les Têtes Brulées emerged as a reaction against pop-makossa, which was seen as abandoning its roots in favor of mainstream success. The band's image was part of its success, and they became known for their shaved heads and multi-colored body painting, done to represent traditional Beti scarification, as well as torn T-shirts that implied a common folkness in contrast to the well-styled pop-makossa performers of the period. They also wore backpacks on stage, a reference to Beti women's traditional method of carrying babies while they danced bikutsi.

It took only a few weeks for Les Têtes Brulées to knock makossa off the Cameroonian charts, and the band even toured France. While in France, Les Têtes Brulées recorded their first LP, Hot Heads, which was also the first bikutsi music recorded for the CD. Hot Heads expanded the lyrical format of the genre to include socio-political issues. Tours of Japan, Africa, Europe, and the United States followed, as well as Claire Denis' film Man No Run, which used footage from their European tour.

=== 1990s ===
In the 1990s, both makossa and bikutsi declined in popularity as a new wave of genres entered mainstream audiences. These included Congolese-influenced new rumba and makossa-soukous, as well as more native forms like bantowbol, northern Cameroonian nganja (which had gained some popularity in the United Kingdom in the mid-1980s), and an urban street music called bend-skin.

Les Têtes Brulées remained the country's most well known musical export, especially after accompanying the Cameroonian soccer team to the World Cup in 1990 in Italy and 1994 in the United States. A new wave of bikutsi artists arose in the early 1990s, including Les Martiens (formed by Les Têtes Brulées bassist Atebass) and the sexually themed roots-singer Katino Ateba ("Ascenseur: le secret de l'homme") and Douala singer Sissi Dipoko ("Bikut-si Hit") as well as a resurgence of old performers like Sala Bekono. Bikutsi's international renown continued to grow, and the song "Proof" from Paul Simon's Rhythm of the Saints, released to mainstream promotion and success in 1990, gained yet more renown from international audiences. Vincent Nguini also contributed guitar arrangements and performance to Simon's Rhythm of the Saints, which became an influential world music album, introducing many North American listeners to the wide range of instrumentation and genres.

In 1993, the Pedalé movement was born as a reaction to the Cameroonian economic slump. Youthful artists like Gibraltar Drakuss, Zele le Bombardier, Eboue Chaleur, Pasto, Roger Bekono, Mbarga Soukous, and Saint-Desiré Atango was a return to the aggressive, earthy sound of bikutsi roots. Meanwhile, Henri Dikongué, whose music incorporated, amongst others, bikutsi and makossa, began to release albums which met international success. He went on to tour Europe and North America. The most recent form of Cameroonian popular music is a fusion of Congolese soukous and makossa, a scene which has produced Petit Pays, Marcel Bwanga, Kotto Bass, Papillon and Jean Pierre Essome. Other popular genres include Bend-skin, mangambeu, and makassi.

== See also ==
- List of musical instruments of Cameroon
