= Kristo Numpuby =

- Birth name: Jean-Christophe Ndjock
- Born: Paris, France
- Genres: Afropop, assiko, world, world fusion, worldbeat, folk, makossa, bikutsi, jazz
- Occupation(s): Singer-songwriter, guitarist, bassist
- Years active: 1996–present
- Labels: Lon Yes
- Website: kristonumpuby.com

Kristo Numpuby is a guitarist, bassist and singer born in Paris but raised in Eséka, South Cameroon.

Author and composer, Kristo sings mainly in Bassa and French on Assiko music the traditional rhythm of the southern Cameroon forests, using a guitar, knives, forks and spoons, and empty bottles for the percussion. He is also inspired by other Cameroonian music styles (Makossa, Bikutsi) and Jazz.

== Biography ==
If the term " cosmopolitan " did not already exist, it would have to be invented for Kristo Numpuby. This musician, born in Paris and raised in a tropical forest, personifies the Africa of yesterday, today and tomorrow. At the age of 8, he began composing songs for children, and took an interest in percussion. " In the village, there were always evenings with musicians, either baptisms, marriages or wakes, "he comments. "They became opportunities for me to admire the percussionists, playing bare-chested with their big muscles."

The education that his musician-grandmother gave him made Kristo a boy with a great interest in anything musical. "My grandmother Nguéba ran a bar in Eséka," he says. "We listened to lots of different music ail day long... classical, jazz, rhythm and blues, James Brown, Afro-Cuban, rumba from Zaire, highlife, makossa and biguine. You could say that I was totally immersed in a very colourful music world."

Kristo finally received his first guitar at age 12. He began playing ail the hits he heard on the radio. Two years later, he was guitarist in one of the four groups in his school. At age 18, he formed a trio that played only his own compositions. The three musicians constantly played each other's instruments during their concerts. He was the lead singer in a group that mostly played assiko music, which no young people usually played. Kristo says, "my buddies didn't understand how a guy like me who spent his vacations in Paris was still interested in village music. Even though I liked disco and ail the music in fashion, that music still fascinated me. Why? I can't tell you. But I found real pleasure in playing Jean Bikoko, Médjo Me Nsom and Dikoumé Bernard, and to finger the guitar strings like them in an unusual way. The assiko musicians and dancers have a special knowledge and a particular technique. I liked their style of music because it was different. But I was just as interested in classical technique as in that of the forest guitarists."

In 1990, Kristo Numpuby got back into the music he had somewhat left behind. "After finishing high school in Douala, I went to the University of Yaoundé, before heading off to Paris in 1986. I wanted to be a TV director. There were such beautiful posters in the metro and TV ads that left you breathless "Generation Mitterrand, Citroen cars, Dim stockings... I was completely subjugated. There were advertising schools everywhere. I got a technical qualification and then for four years, I was an advert wonder kid. This is how I wound up in the studio to oversee the recording of adverts that I was responsible for. We had a problem finding musicians. I reacted quickly, and Morning Limbé, a blues piece composed in 1982, became the soundtrack."

Eventually, music replaced advertising. Kristo began hanging out in recording and rehearsal studios, and became a studio bass player. "In December 94, I was touring in Ghana with an African star for the Panafest. At the hotel, I ran into Stevie Wonder. I had about 20 of his records at home. When we finished talking, he asked me if I had some work of mine he could listen to. I had nothing to show him what I had been doing musically. That's when I understood that I had to record my compositions."

In his first two albums "Assiko City" (Night & Day, 1997) and "An Sol Mè" (Night & Day, 2001), Kristo varies in style from sharp traditional African rhythms to the folk sounds of African-Americans, played on acoustic instruments. On stage, accompanied by a percussionist/bottle player and two other musicians, he is one of those artists who excites and surprises his audience at every concert.

Kristo also recorded with drummer Denis Tchangou (Mory Kanté, Papa Wemba ...) an album entirely devoted to the chanson legend Georges Brassens. The result is "Brassens in Africa" (Lon Yes/Mosaic Music), an album that illustrates the beauty of cultural crossovers but also a warm tribute to the French poet on African rhythms.

== Discography ==
- Assiko City (1997, Lon Yes/Night & Day)
- An Sol Mè (2001, Lon Yes/Night & Day)
- Brassens en Afrique (2007, Lon Yes/Mosaic Music)
