= Dance in Cameroon =

Dance arts of Cameroon

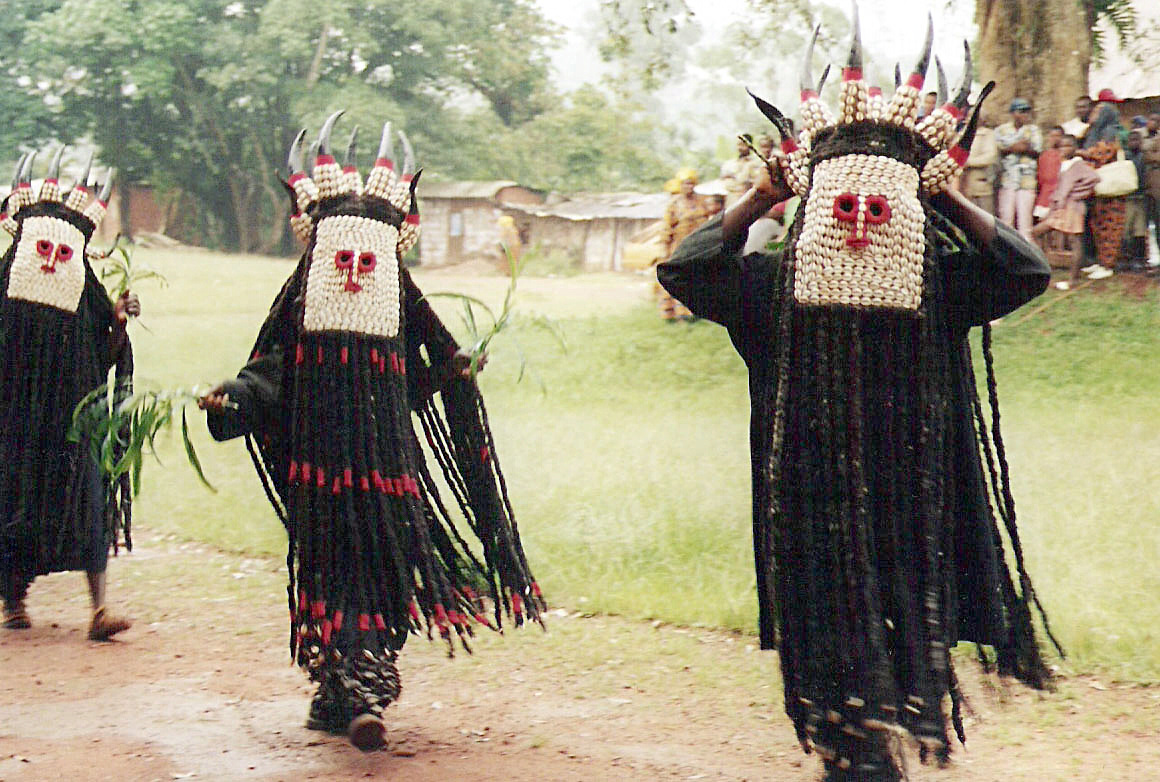
Bamileke dancers perform in Batié, West Province.

Dance in Cameroon is an integral part of the tradition, religion, and socialising of the country's people. Cameroon has more than 200 traditional dances, each associated with a different event or situation. Colonial authorities and Christian missionaries discouraged native dances as threats to security and pagan holdovers. However, after Cameroon's independence, the government recognised traditional dance as part of the nation's culture and made moves to preserve it.

Traditional dances follow strict choreography and segregate dancers based on age, occupation, sex, social status, and other factors. Some dances require special costumes and props such as masks or fans. Professional dancers make a living among some ethnic groups, and other professionals perform at national festivals and for tourists. Popular dance, wherein men and women dance together, is found in Cameroon's bars, nightclubs, and private parties. This style is closely tied with popular music, such as makossa, bikutsi, highlife, and hip hop. Dancing is an important avenue of social protest and political rallying in the country.

== History ==
Under Cameroon's colonial-era governments, German, British, and French regimes banned dances that they deemed a threat to their primacy. Meanwhile, Christian missionaries discouraged all kinds of dancing and forbade dances that they felt represented paganism or offended Christian sensibilities. Many of these dances have since died out. Other dances were forgotten when the rituals associated with them were outlawed for similar reasons.

Nevertheless, traditional dance persisted. People continued to practice dances for purely social purposes or adapted them to Christian worship. Dancing in church became increasingly common as evangelical Christianity gained popularity and Cameroonian priests and pastors replaced Americans and Europeans. After Cameroon gained independence in 1960, the government recognised traditional dance as an integral part of the nation's culture, and non-governmental organisations promoted its preservation. Some villages enroll children in dance groups to teach them about their culture and native dances.

== Traditional dance ==
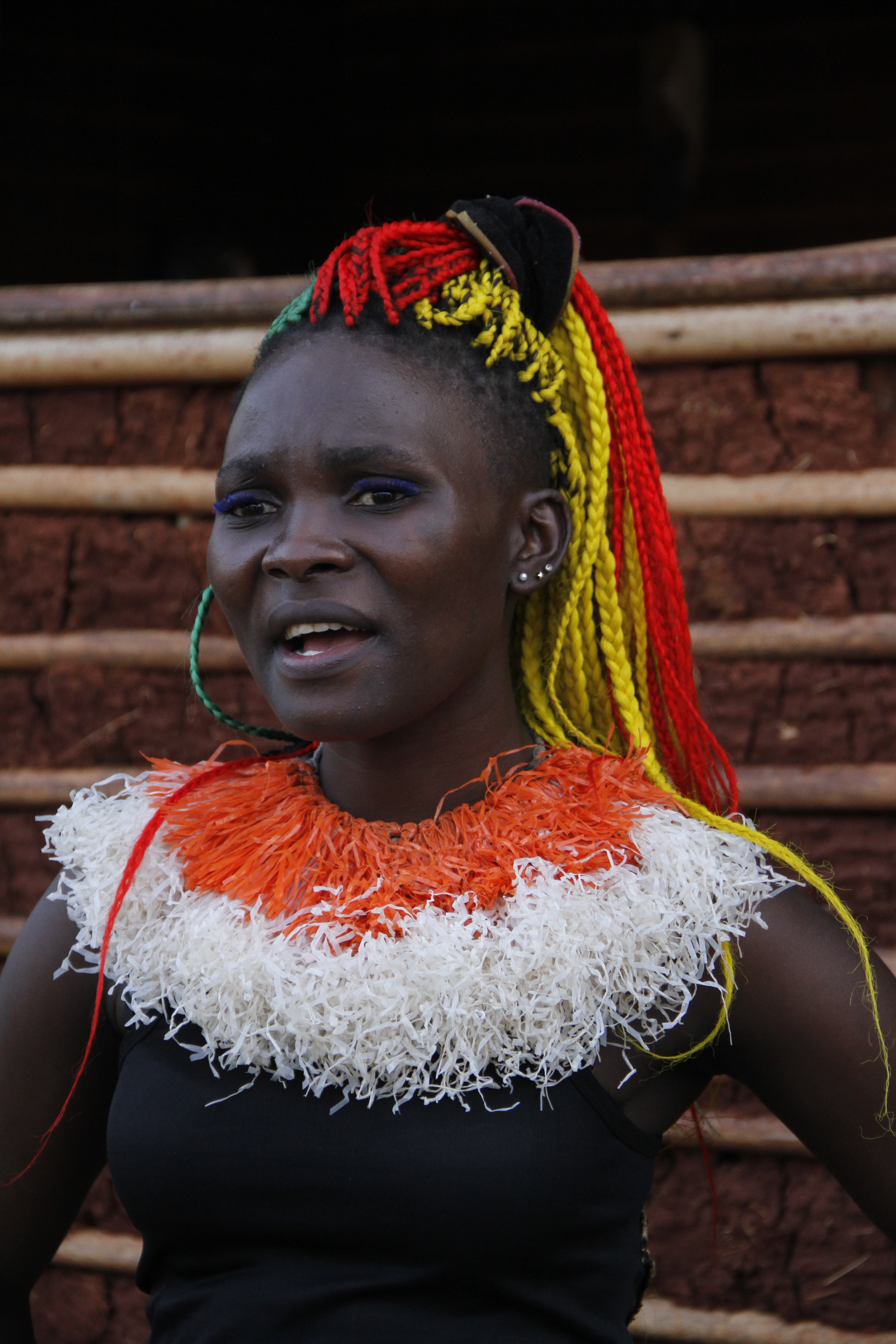
Traditional dancer at the National Festival of Arts and Culture in Yaoundé

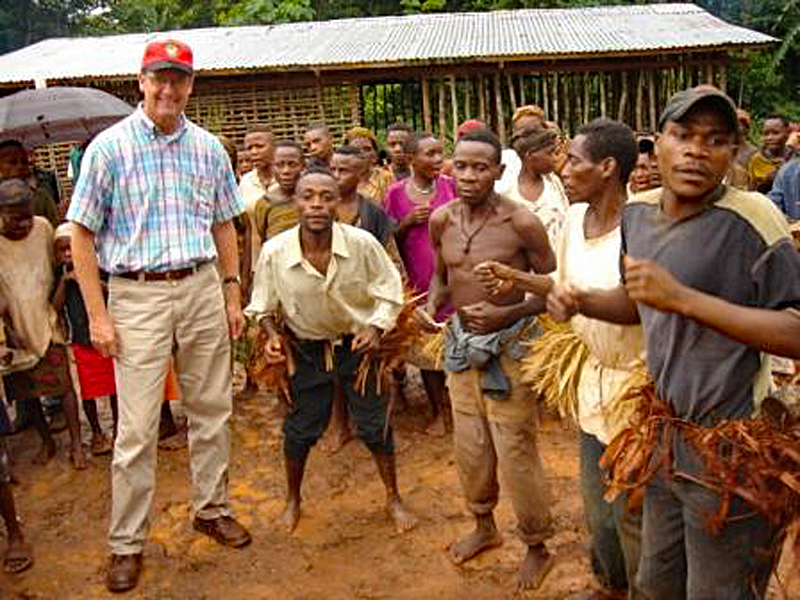
Baka dancers greet the U.S. ambassador to Cameroon in the East Province.

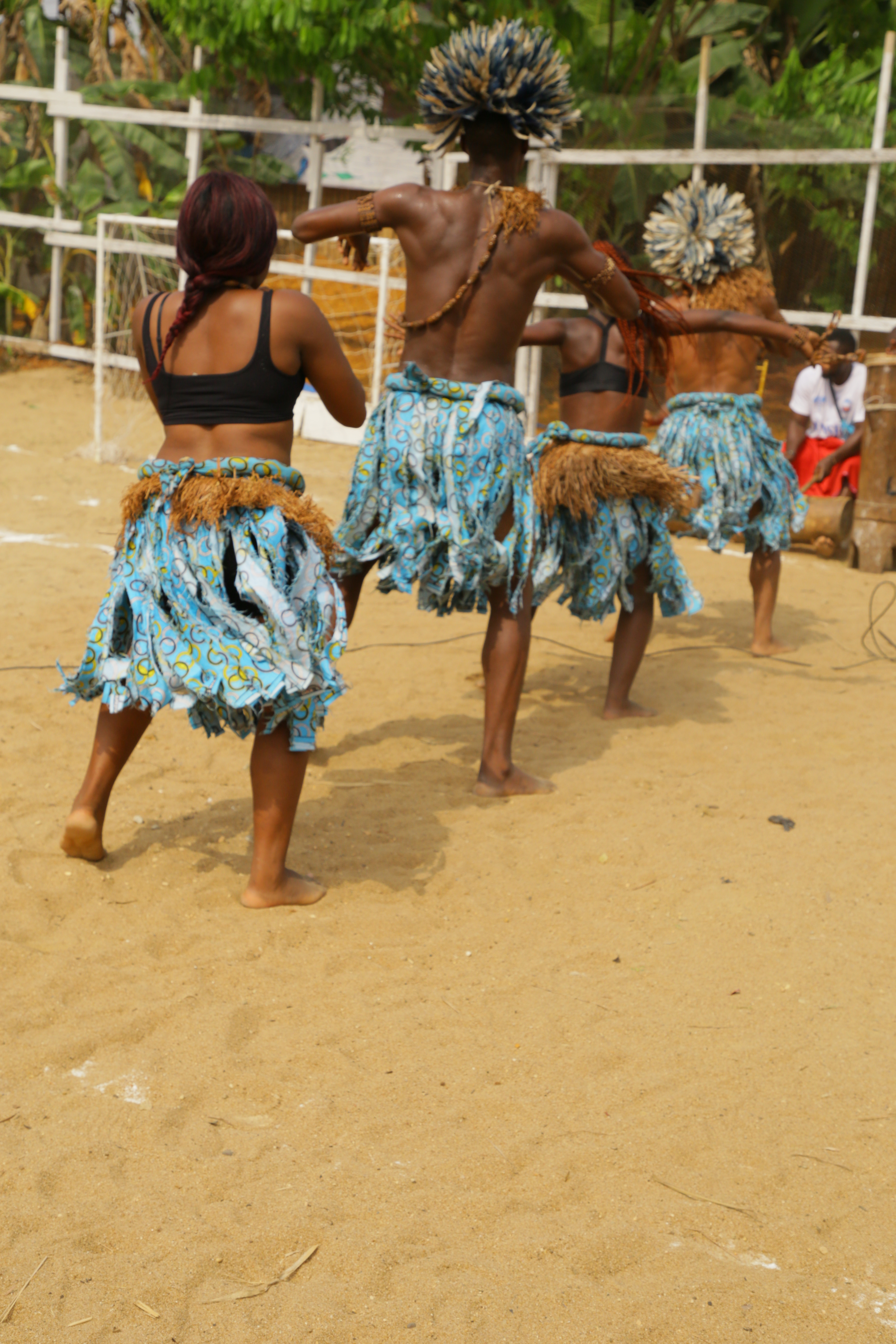
Traditional Dance In Cameroon

Cameroon is home to more than 200 different traditional dances. Dance is part of most ceremonies and rituals. Such dances accompany births, christenings, weddings, and funerals and invoke the spirits of ancestors to cure the ill or increase fertility. The Bamileke perform war dances, for example, and the motio of the southwest incorporates the slaying of a goat with a single blow to demonstrate the dancers' prowess. The Baka dance the luma to celebrate a successful hunt. Among some groups, dancers work themselves into a trance and communicate with the spirit world. For example, members of the ntsham society of the Kaka people in Cameroon's northwest dance to bring about spiritual possession.

Typically, traditional dances follow certain restrictions. Most traditional dances segregate participants according to sex. For example, women and men may form concentric same-sex circles, or they may dance in separate areas. Among various fondoms in the Cameroon grassfields, nobles and commoners may not participate in the same dances. Likewise, traditional laws severely restrict the dancing of the fon's wives and daughters, often restricting them to the palace.

Some dances are intended only for a specific class of people, such as hunters, jesters, or warriors. Among some ethnic groups, professional dancers make their living performing dances at the appropriate ceremonies. In some villages, a diviner dances as part of his or her duties. In modern times, such traditional dance professionals are rare. Instead, professional dancers live in urban centres and perform for tourists or at national festivals.

Many traditional Cameroonian dances follow strict choreography, although improvisation is common. Dancers move different parts of the body independently, focusing motion on more than one area. Dances are often associated with specific regalia or props. Traditional objects used include leather fans and small pieces of cloth. In the grasslands, masks are common. The gourna of the Tupuri incorporates long sticks that dancers carry upright in a circle.

== Popular dance ==
Popular dance is within the purview of urban bars, nightclubs, and private parties, although it has grown more popular in rural areas. DJs provide the music as dancers move about and drink beer or palm wine. Unlike traditional dances, popular dancing allows the sexes to mingle. Cameroon's most popular native musical genres, bikutsi and makossa, are styles of dance music. Cameroon has imported a number of popular dances from abroad, including the maringa from Ghana in the 1850s, the ashiko from Nigeria in the 1920s, and the abele from Nigeria more recently. Popular non-Cameroonian dance music includes Nigerian highlife and American hip-hop. In 2000, the government of the Southwest Province banned mapouka, a dance imported from Côte d'Ivoire, for its sexual nature. European dance, such as ballet, is popular among wealthy urban Cameroonians.

Dance has become an important vehicle of social commentary and political protest. While the popular press can be muzzled by the government, dancers in the street are freer to express their discontent with—or support for—government policies or political parties. Opponents of Cameroon's first president, Ahmadou Ahidjo, danced to show their disapproval. Other popular dances commemorate historical events from Cameroonian history.
