= Têtes =

Têtes or Tetes may refer to:

- Les Grosses Têtes, daily French radio program on the RTL French radio network
- Les Têtes Brulées, Cameroonian band known for a mellow pop version of the bikutsi dance music
- Les têtes interverties, 1957 French short film written and directed by Alejandro Jodorowsky
- Têtes à claques, French-language humour website created in 2006
- Têtes Raides, French folk rock group blending French poetry, theater, visual arts and the Big Top circus antics
