= Kareyce Fotso =

Cameroonian singer

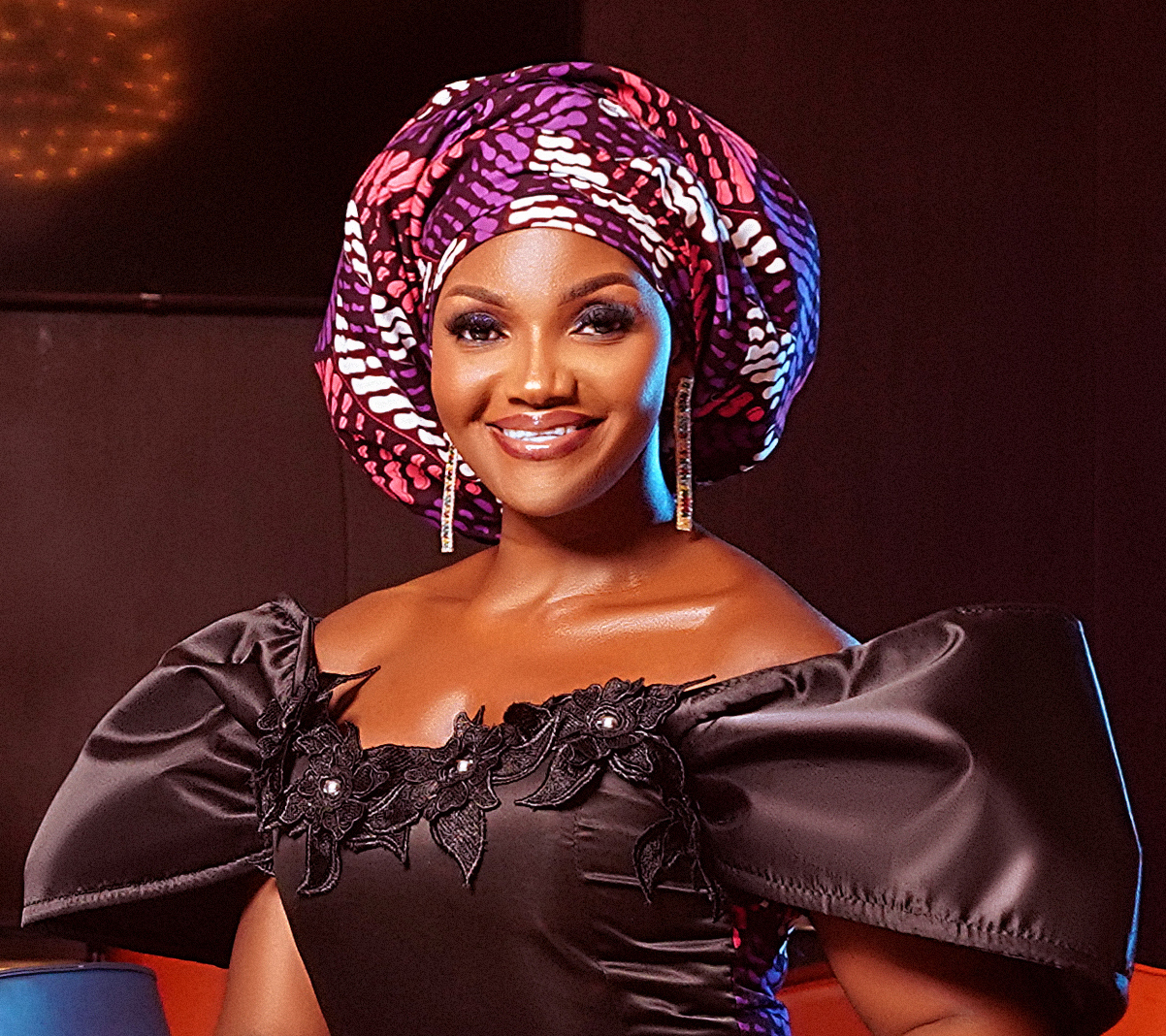
Kareyce Fotso in 2023

Kareyce Fotso is a Cameroonian singer who performs around the world and in various styles, including Afro pop, blues and mangambeu.

== Biography ==
Fotso was born in Bandjoun and grew up in Yaoundé. While she learned to speak Ewondo in Yaoundé, she primarily sings in Ghomalaʼ, her native language. Fotso studied biochemistry and film at school, but eventually went on to become a singer.

Fotso sang for the band, Korongo Jam, starting in 2001, until the band split up in 2006. Fotso went back to Cameroon after the split where she began to perform in cabarets in Yaoundé. Her first album, Mulato was released locally in 2009. At the 2009 Jeux de la Francophonie, she won the silver medal at the song contest. In 2010, she released the album, Kwegne. Her next album, Mokte, was released in 2014.

Fotso sings in various styles, including mangambeu, Afro pop, world music, soul music and Ethnic blues. When she sings, she often accompanies herself with guitar, wooden drums or bells. Fotso performs around the world.
