= Petit-Pays =

Cameroonian musician (born 1967)

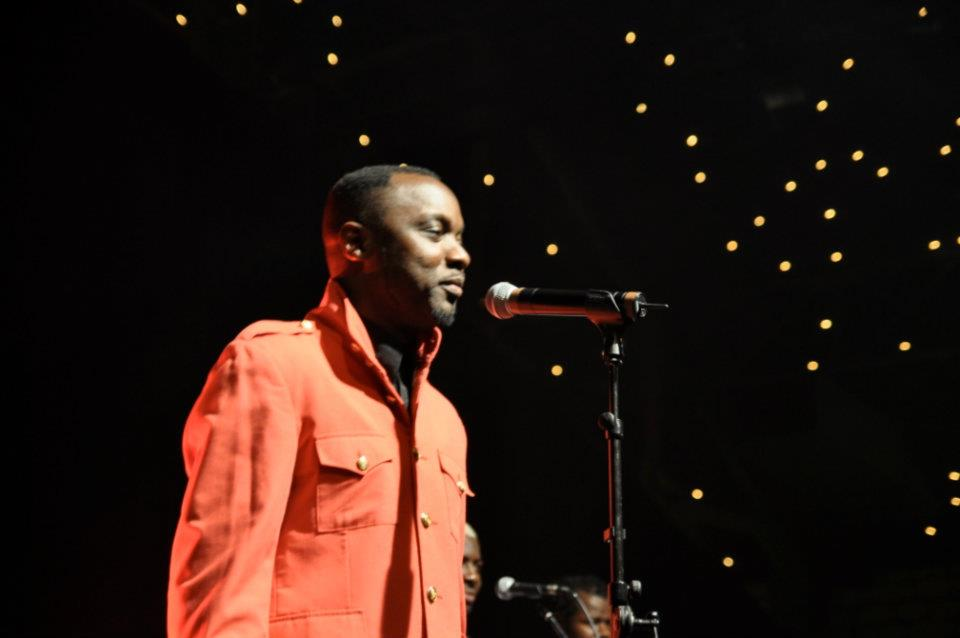
- A Cameroonian musician

Background information
- Born: Adolphe Claude Moundi; 5 June 1967 (age 58)
- Genres: Makossa, African
- Occupations: African singer, dancer, director
- Instrument: Vocals
- Labels: Omega

Petit-Pays (born Adolphe Claude Moundi in Douala, Cameroon on 5 June 1967) is a Cameroonian musician.

Petit-Pays has over 35 albums to his credit and is the Cameroonian musician with the highest number of songs ever.

In 1996, he had sold over 50,000 cassettes the day of the release of his Double Album Class F and Class M.

He is also known as Oméga, Rabba Rabbi, Le Turbo d'Afrique, Adonaï, Le Neveu de Jésus, and recently his latest sobriquet of Effatta and famously L'avocat défenseur des femmes (lawyer for women). He is the most celebrated Cameroonian musician of the late 1980s, 1990s and 2000s.

His music has evolved over the years adapting to contemporary African genres. He mixes native Cameroonian makossa with soukous, zouk, and salsa, leading to the portmanteau label of Makossa Love for some of his music. He launched his first album Ça fait mal... in 1987, after working with makossa producers.

He has a band, known as Les Sans Visas, which has seen several band members moving on to start their own solo careers over the 1990s and 2000s (decade). It includes artists like Jojo Moussio, Samy Diko, Kaïssa Pakito, Samantha Fock, Guy Manu, Njohreur, Xavier Lagaf, Mathematik, Sony 007 and Monny Eka and many other successful Makossa musicians. He gave the name "Sans-Visas" to his band because he was deported from France in 1985 for not having a visa.

He is the crowned king of Makossa and the most popular artist in Cameroon.

He is known for his sometimes offensive dressing, memorable concerts in Africa, controversial album covers and lyrics.
