= Bébé Manga =

Background information
- Born: Elizabeth Bessem Ayamo Manga; 27 November 1948; Mamfe, Manyu Division, Cameroon
- Died: 1 July 2011 (aged 62) Douala, Cameroon
- Genres: Makossa
- Occupation: Singer
- Instrument: Vocals
- Years active: 1975-2011
- Formerly of: Ebanda Manfred, Manu Dibango, Tom Yoms

Elizabeth Bessem Ayamo Manga (27 November 1948 – 1 July 2011), also known as Bébé Manga, was a Cameroonian makossa singer whose best-known song is "Ami O". She is considered one of the most popular makossa singers of the 1980s.

== Early life ==
She was born In Mamfe, Manyu Division the South West Region. Bebe Manga was lauded by the journalists in Ivory Coast because of her distinctive and expressive voice.

== Early career ==
She started her career in 1975, singing in a night club in Abidjan, Côte d'Ivoire, called "Son de Guitare" (Sound of a guitar). Her friends impressed on the manager of the club that Manga had a good voice and could sing. After singing quizas quizas, the manager of the club, lost in admiration for the talented singer hired her on the spot and began her professional career. From that point on, it was a roller coaster ride. Manga has performed extensively in Africa: Gabon, Senegal, Mali, Zaire, Togo, Burkina Faso, Ghana, Liberia, Côte d'Ivoire, Congo Brazzaville, Benin, Morocco etc. In the Caribbean Islands (Guadeloupe, Haiti, Martinique), Colombia, USA, France.

== Rise to fame ==
Bebe Manga rose to prominence in 1980, when she replayed Ebanda Manfred's 1962 radio hit "Amie" (meaning "friend" in French). Manga's version known as "Amio" earned her the prestigious "Maracas D'or" award from SACEM, and a place in history as one of Cameroon's greatest voices who has inspired female stars such as Ruth Kotto and Jackie Biho. Most notably, Manga transformed Ebanda Manfred's little-known Radio Douala recording into a worldwide hit that has attained cult status similar to Pete Seeger's "Guantanamera", that other iconic song replayed by artists as diverse as Joe dassin and Wyclef Jean.

Later, at the end of the 1990s, she put out another world-class song, "Mota Benamaa" originally sung by Charles Lembe, deploring the situation of children suffering around the world. Her talents were celebrated at the Top D'Or 2005 in Abidjan, as she was voted one of the best African artists of all time.

She is featured on Manu Dibango's Manu Safari album, and partnered with other talented artists like Tom Yoms on several hits. Some of her other songs that now feature in an online "BEST OF BEBE MANGA" compilation are: "Aloba", "Bele Sombo", "Djiya kamba", "Alice Agbor", "Esele mba", "Jemea longo", "Muna Muto", "Eyiegele Ding" and "Zipte Men".

== Death ==
On 1 July 2011, Bébé Manga died on the way to hospital after suffering a heart attack at her home in Douala. She was 62. She was buried on 30 July 2011 in her family compound in Tinto, Upper Bayang sub-division of Manyu Division, Cameroon.

== Legacy ==
In the last two decades, Amio has been replayed dozens of times and in different languages by musicians in Europe, The Caribbean, Latin and North America, and Africa, among them André Astasié, Henri Salvador, star of the French song in 1982, Manu Dibango in 1993, Monique Seka, Nayanka Bell, Fred Paul, Passi and Bisso na Biso in 2000, Papa Wemba and Angelique Kidjo, Jacky Biho, Naima, along with African Connection with Denise and Bloco in 2004 (Summer Hit in France and Gold Plate Record) are among those prestigious artist who played, adapted and interpreted this hit single and Bébé Manga again (in English).

== Discography ==
Albums

- Ami-Oyomiya (1982)
- Beko (1982)
- Djoudjou Dada (1982)
- Temps Futur (2000)
