= Mama Ohandja =

Cameroonian singer, musical arranger, dancer and choreographer

- Born: 1942 (age 82–83); Cameroon
- Occupations: Singer; Choreographer; Dancer; Music arranger

Mama Ohandja is a Cameroonian singer, musical arranger, dancer and choreographer. In the early 1970s, he became the most prominent musician in the region to marry traditional music with modern international styles, combining tom-toms, traditional balafons, and other instruments with electric instrumentation.

Ohandja was born in the village of Ebanga, in the district of Okola in Cameroon to parents who were traditional singers. His own musical career began in the 1960s interpreting African, Latin American, and European songs in cabaret with his orchestra De Mandoline Jazz d'Efok. But it was in 1971 that Ohandja developed his recognizable style with the release of the successful Confiance jazz. One of his most famous songs remains "Super Moon Ebon" (The Super Fancy Lady) in the early 1980s. Ohandja fused disparate influences to become known as "Jimi Hendrix of Cameroon." Belinga Multiforme known nowadays as an autonomous singer started his career as dancer and choreographer within the "Confiance Jazz". Mama Ohandja continues to record and perform with his group les Magistrats which was founded in 1991.

He has 5 children: 3 daughters (Aimée, Bernadette, Fanny) and 2 sons (Guy and Jean).

== See also ==
- Music of Cameroon
