= Tactic =

Tactic(s) or Tactical may refer to:

- Tactic (method), a conceptual action implemented as one or more specific tasks
  - Military tactics, the disposition and maneuver of units on a particular sea or battlefield
  - Chess tactics
  - Political tactics
- TACTIC (military program), a U.S. military research program conducted by DARPA

== Computer science ==
- A tactic is a procedure for deriving terms in an interactive theorem prover

== Geography ==
- Tactic, Guatemala, a municipality in the Alta Verapaz department

== Entertainment ==
- Tactics, a dart game similar to cricket
- "Tactics", a 1995 song by The Yellow Monkey
- Tactics (album), a 1996 album by John Abercrombie
- Tactics (band), an Australian band
- Tactics (game), generally credited as the first board wargame
- Tactics (manga), a Japanese manga series
- Tactic (video game), a puzzle video game
- Tactics (video games studio), a Japanese visual novel studio
- Tactical (album), a 2011 album by World Under Blood
