= Ebanda Manfred =

Background information
- Born: Ebanda Dooh Manfred; December 2, 1935; Bali, Douala, Cameroon
- Died: September 3, 2003 (aged 67) Douala, Cameroon
- Genres: Makossa
- Occupation: Singer
- Instrument: Vocals
- Years active: 1961–1989

Ebanda Manfred (December 2, 1935 – September 3, 2003) was a Cameroonian makossa singer.He is also composer of the song "Amie" later performed by Bébé Manga.

== Early life ==
Ebanda Manfred was born in Bali, Douala, Cameroon to Mr. Dooh Ebanda and Naéémy Matheo. After obtaining the CPCE in 1952 at Public School of Bonapriso, he continued his studies in Ebolowa and the Technical College of Douala, where he obtained the CAP in 1957.

=== Rise to Stardom ===
In 1960, Ebanda, age 24, fell in love with a schoolgirl in Yaoundé, Amié Brigitte Essomba, an unmarried teen mother who left school to care for her child while still in the first cycle of secondary education. Ebanda Manfred expressed his feelings to her, she says she cannot engage in a love affair as her baby is not weaned. Finding the waiting too long – especially since the following year he returned to Douala – Ebanda Manfred sang his despair: "Amié, njika bunya so mo, mo o oa my Dube no, na na mba tondi oa?". Translation: "Amié, when will you finally believe in my love?". The song "Amié" was born.

Bébé Manga greatly contributed to the song's popularity, especially with his 1980 version, arranged and recorded in Côte d'Ivoire by Jimmy Hyacinthe. "Ami O" has been covered by many artists, including Diana Pequeno, Monique Séka, Papa Wemba, Angélique Kidjo, among others.

When the song came out, Amié was already married to another man. Unfortunately her husband was violent and jealous. Whenever he heard this song, he husband beat her to the point that eventually it burst her left eye. She subsequently divorced and remarried. She is still alive as of 2025.

== Career ==
In 1961, Manfred Ebanda arrives in Douala and integrates "Rhythmic band" with fire Nelle Eyoum. It was while he was in this group that recorded "friend" on the radio in 1962. From the year of registration, the Ball begins again. The kickoff is given by Francis Bebey who released a record, in Europe, in which he plays "friend". Four years later, it's another makossa singer Paul Ebeny, which records in France. At this designer rhythm Makossa, he was awarded the first prize for the best song of the Reunification in 1971 in Cameroon Radio. Ebanda worked with his wife Villa, until their divorce in 1978.

== Death ==
On August 29, 2003, he was taken to hospital Bonassama, in Douala. After receiving care, Ebanda Manfred returned home to Bodjongo. But his condition worsened, and he was brought to the Ad Lucem Hospital suffering further complications. The diagnosis revealed that his condition required surgery. Ebanda Manfred died on September 3, 2003, in Douala a few minutes before having surgery due to stomach pains. He was interred on September 13, 2003, in Bojongo, Douala, Cameroon.

== Legacy ==
Other compositions of the singer include "Enoumedi", "Baby na granny", and "Ballad Bantu”.

== Discography ==
Albums

- 1981: Sister Muna
- 1983: Manfred Ebanda
- 1989: Lolo
