= Bantowbol =

Style of music from Cameroon

- Stylistic origins: Cameroonian folk music
- Cultural origins: Cameroon, Africa

Bantowbol or bantubol is a style of music from Cameroon. The genre is derived from Cameroonian folk music. The name bantowbol is partially derived from bal, a term for accordion playing. The principal musicians of bantowbol are Gibraltar Drakus and Nkondo Si Tony.
