= Mangambeu =

Mangambeu is a popular musical style of the Bangangte people of Cameroon. It was popularised by Pierre Diddy Tchakounte. Today, other singers, such as Kareyce Fotso, continue to sing in this style.
