= Ekambi Brillant =

Cameroonian makossa artist (1948–2022)

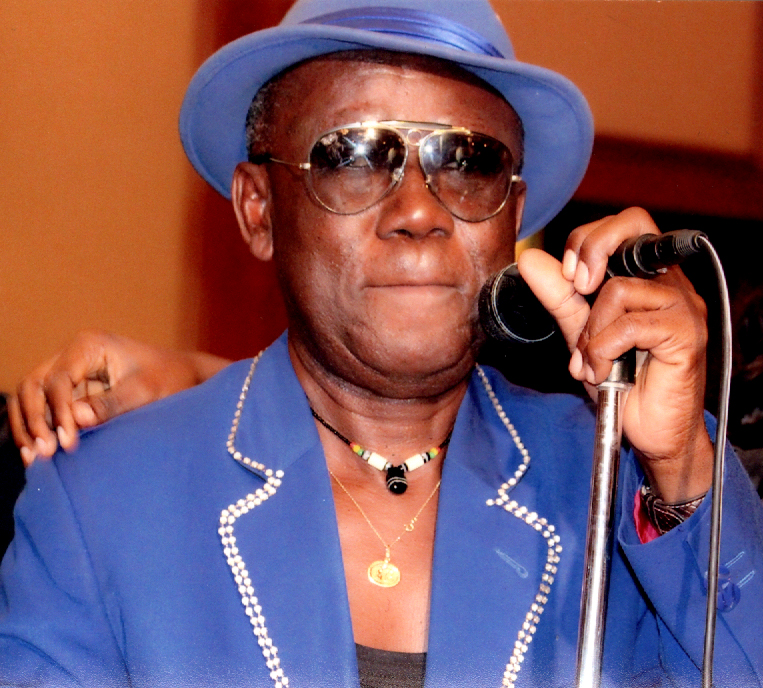
Ekambi Brillant

Ekambi Louis Brillant (18 June 1948 – 12 December 2022) was a Cameroonian makossa artist and singer.

== Biography ==
Brillant was born on 18 June 1948, in Dibombari, a village near Douala, to Ekambi Brillant, a merchant and cultural promoter. He spent much of his childhood with his maternal grandparents in Djébalè (a suburb of Douala); it was there that his passion for music was born, listening to the pirogues singing on their way back from the sea.

In 1962, he passed the entrance exam and was accepted at the Lycée Général-Leclerc in Yaoundé. It was there, under the guidance of Mr. Zane Daniel - a French music teacher - that he learned how to play guitar. In 1971, at the age of 23, he abandoned his studies to join Les crack's as a guitarist. They performed in the nightclub Le Domino. He then entered the music competition launched by the Office de Radiodiffusion Télévision Française (ORTF) whose jury was composed, among others, of Manu Dibango and Francis Bebey. He won the competition and subsequently released his first single entitled "Jonguèlè la Ndolo", which recorded 20,000 sales.

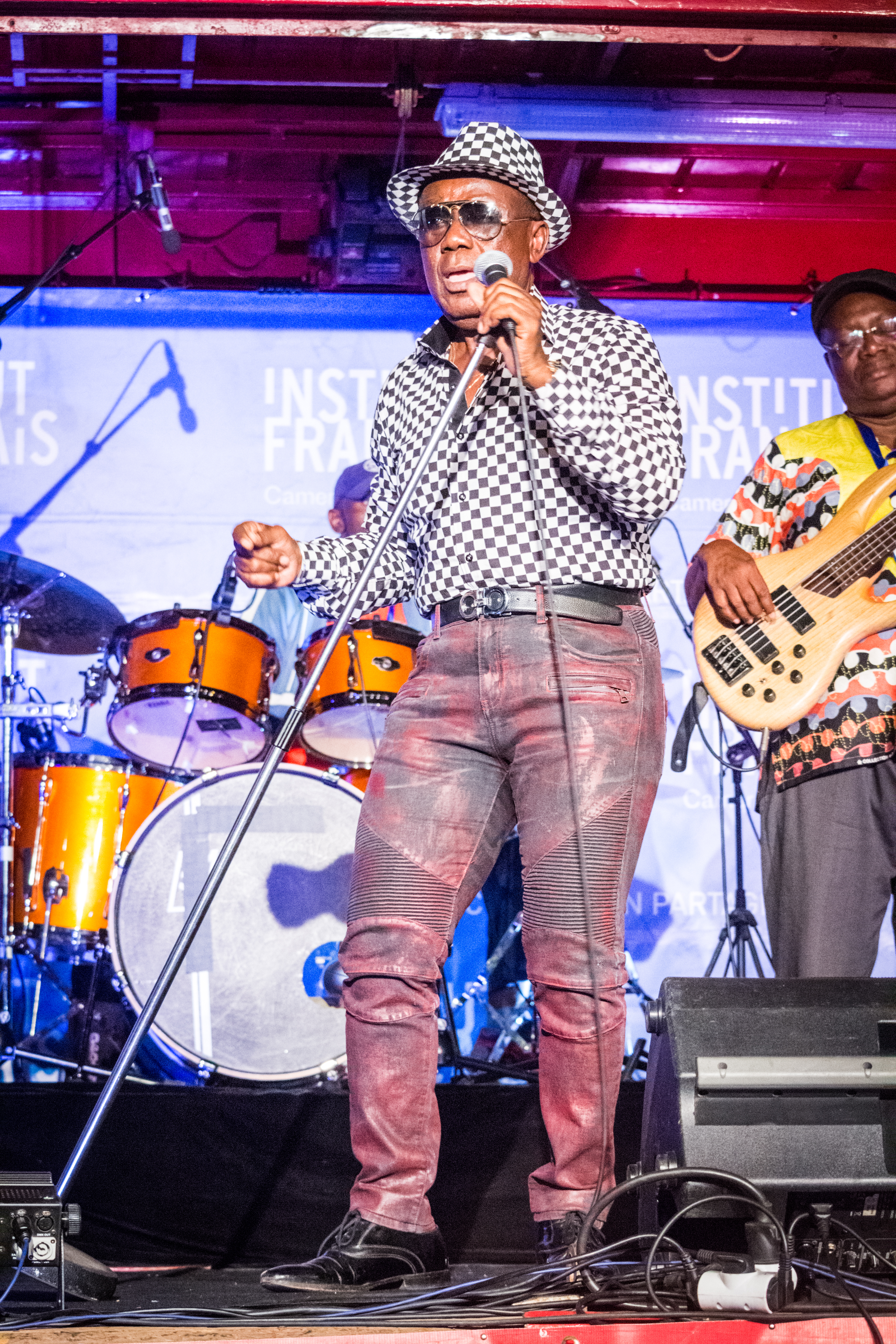
Ekambi Brillant performing on a stage in 2017

When he arrived in France in 1972, he signed with label Phonogram and released his second 45 rpm record which was also a success with 25,000 sales. In 1975, he broke his contract with Phonogram and joined Slim Pezin with whom he released the album Africa Oumba and the track "Elongui" which was later covered by several other African and European artists. This album recorded a record of about 4 million sales. This was followed by collaborations with Slim Pezin as the producer for the tracks "Soul Castel" and "Musunguédi".

Brillant died on 12 December 2022, at Laquintinie hospital, Douala, aged 74, after a battle with a long-term illness.
