= TACTIC (military program) =

American military research program

Threat Agent Cloud Tactical Intercept & Countermeasure, or TACTIC, is a United States military research program whose goal is to detect, classify, and neutralize airborne biological and chemical warfare agents.

== Overview ==
As Dr. Karen Wood, program manager of TACTIC in the Tactical Technology Office of DARPA, explains:

The purpose of the Threat Agent Cloud Tactical Intercept and Countermeasure (TACTIC) Program is to provide the United States (US) military with the capability to protect the warfighter from CWA/BWA threat clouds on the battlefield. The goal of the program is to provide a system that can rapidly detect and identify the presence of a typical threat cloud and provide a countermeasure to that cloud that will kill it before it reaches the intended target.

=== Detection and discrimination ===
The program's goal is to be able to detect and identify CWA/BWA threats within the time frame of one minute. Research includes such methodologies as:

- bead-based assays for biological molecules
- fluorescent assays for chemical molecules
- retro-reflector assays for both chemical and biological molecules

=== Removal of threat ===
Upon successfully determining the nature of the CWA/BWA threat, "technologies that mimic the seeding of rain clouds will be developed for particulate bio-agents, and technologies that react with chemical agent vapor will be investigated." When an effective system for both identifying and countering the CWA/BWA threat is engineered, DARPA will then provide a prototype which will be vigorously tested in aerosol chambers. Only after completion of chamber testing will full-scale field testing commence.

== See also ==
- Biodefense
- Biological warfare
- Chemical warfare
