= Eboa Lotin =

Cameroonian composer and singer

- Birth name: Emmanuel Eboa Lotin
- Born: August 6, 1942; Douala, Cameroon
- Died: October 6, 1997 (age 55)
- Genres: Makossa
- Years active: 1962–1997

Emmanuel Eboa Lotin (August 6, 1942 – October 6, 1997) was a Cameroonian musical artist who created music based on the style of Makossa, native to his home country.

== Early life ==
Lotin was born in the city of Douala, in Cameroon. His father was Adolph Lotin Same, a Baptist pastor, who died when Eboa was 3. When he was a young child, his leg was paralyzed due to atrophy resulting from a quinine injection.

In 1962, Lotin recorded his first single "Mulema Mwam, Elimba Dikalo". Lotin was regarded as a major figure in the Makossa musical genre.

Lotin died on October 6, 1997.
