= Hot Heads =

Studio album by les Têtes Brulées
- Released: 1990
- Genre: Bikutsi
- Label: Shanachie
- Producer: Andy Lyden, Jean-Marie Ahanda

Les Têtes Brulées chronology
Man No Run (1989)	Hot Heads (1990)	Bikutsi Rock (1991)

Hot Heads is an album by the Cameroonian band les Têtes Brulées, released in 1990. The band supported the album with a North American tour.

== Production ==
Recorded in France, the album was produced by Andy Lyden and Jean-Marie Ahanda. The band sang in a Cameroonian vernacular, French, and English. Guitar player Theodore "Zanzibar" Epeme committed suicide before the album was released. Epeme was known for applying foam rubber to his guitar to imitate a balafon. Some songs are about musicians leaving the countryside for city life.

== Critical reception ==
Professional ratings
Review scores
Source	Rating
AllMusic	5/5 stars
Chicago Tribune	4/4 stars
MusicHound World: The Essential Album Guide	5/5 stars

The Gazette deemed the band "Africa's answer to the Red Hot Chili Peppers," writing that "modern bikutsi is a stripped-down sound of chicken-feet guitars, drums that won't quit and the kind of yelping, whooping and singing that says we mean business." The Philadelphia Daily News wrote that les Têtes Brulées "combine fast tribal rhythms, swirling guitars and abrasive, multi-lingual vocals."

The Chicago Tribune stated: "The star of the show is guitarist Theodore 'Zanzibar' Epeme. His solos are light yet propulsive, building inexorably and seamlessly from skittering rhythm lines." The Houston Chronicle noted that "electric guitars and Western drums have replaced the 'balafon' and percussion, but the vocals are rough, in the ancient folk tradition." The New York Times listed it among the best albums of 1990.

AllMusic wrote: "Consistently inspired, Hot Heads underscores the band's resilient nature." MusicHound World: The Essential Album Guide considered Hot Heads "perhaps the greatest African rock 'n' roll ever made."

== Track listing ==
No.	Title	Length
1.	"Za Ayi Neyi"
2.	"Naoum Wom"
3.	"Ngole Likas"
4.	"Têtes Brulées"
5.	"Man fo Job"
6.	"Papa"
7.	"Ma Musique á Moi"
8.	"Ca Fait Mal"
9.	"Zanzi Collection"
