= Les Têtes Brulées =

Cameroonian band

- Origin: Yaoundé, Cameroon
- Genres: Bikutsi, Pop
- Years active: 1980s–2000s
- Past members: Jean-Marie Ahanda; Zanzibar; Atebass

Les Têtes Brulées (French pronunciation: [le tɛt bʁyle]) are a Cameroonian band known for a pop version of the bikutsi dance music. Their name literally means the burnt heads in French, but more likely is meant to imply mindblown or hotheads, although founder Jean-Marie Ahanda prefers the translation "burnt minds".

== About ==
Les Têtes Brulées first rose to prominence in the 1980s, and quickly became the world's most famous bikutsi band. However, many critics and fans of the genre did not like their aggressively electrified sound, and the band saw some criticism. They became known for their distinctive costumes, shaved heads and brightly painted bodies, which were meant to evoke traditional Beti scarification.

The band was formed by Jean-Marie Ahanda, and included the guitarist Zanzibar, who remains well known for innovative attachment of foam rubber to the bridge of his guitar, which made the instrument sound like a traditional balafon. Zanzibar's death in 1988 threatened to end the band's future, but they continued performing and recording. Their first LP was Hot Heads, which was also the first full-length recording of bikutsi, and contained lyrics which addressed social issues. The band toured across Africa, Europe, the United States and Japan; some footage of this tour was used in Claire Denis' film Man No Run. Later, they accompanied the Cameroonian soccer team to a match in Italy, which brought the band many new fans.

== Discography ==
- 1988: Les Têtes Brûlées (Bleu Caraïbe)
- 1990: Ma Musique a Moi (Bleu Caraibes)
- 1990: Hot Heads (Shanachie Records)
- 1992: Bikutsi Rock (Shanachie Records)
- 1995: Be Happy (Dona Wana)
- 2000: Bikutsi Fever "Best of" (Africa Fete)
