= Makossa =

Cameroonian music genre

- Stylistic origins: Ethnogenesis: Assiko; essewe; bolobo; Exogenesis: highlife; Congolese rumba; merengue; classical Baptist music; gospel; funk & disco
- Cultural origins: 20th century, Douala, Cameroon

Other topics
- Music of Cameroon; African popular music

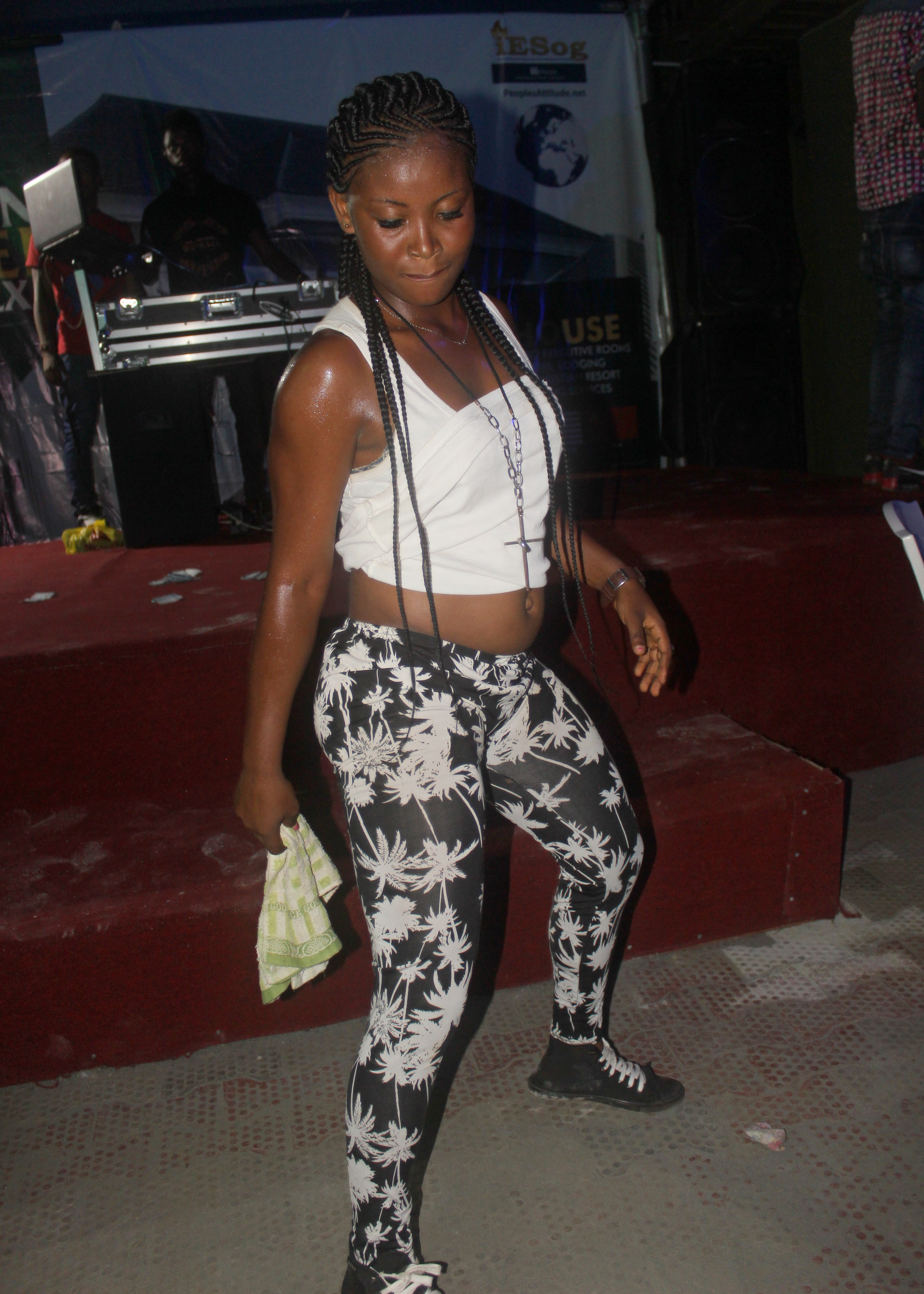
Makossa dancer in Enugu State, Nigeria

Makossa is a music genre originating in Douala, Littoral Region, Cameroon in the late 20th century. Like much other music of Sub-Saharan Africa, it uses strong electric bass rhythms and prominent brass. Makossa uses guitar accompaniments, in the forms of solo and rhythm guitar, with a main singer (lead vocalist) and a choir of backup singers, with the focus being on the texture of the guitar, the role it plays in the song, the relationship between it and other instruments (including the bass, drum set, horns, synthesizers, etc.), the lyrical content and languages sung as well as their relationship (as far as timbre goes) with the music, the uses of various percussion instruments, including the bottle, the groove of the bass as well as the drums, and the use of technical knowledge and microprocessors to make the music. It is in common time (4/4) for the vast majority of cases.

Language-wise, it is typically sung in French, Duala or Pidgin English. Tempo-wise, it is typically in between 130 and 170 BPM. It traditionally consisted of guitar-picking techniques that borrows from bikutsi; with a guitar-structure of a guitar switching from solo to rhythm from assiko; supplanted with complex bass grooves, and gradually picked up on brass section, from funk and later in the 70s, string section, from disco. It along with this acquired the sebene from Congolese rumba. In the 1980s makossa had a wave of mainstream success across Africa and to a lesser extent abroad. It is considered a significant Cameroonian and African music genre.

Makossa, which in some accounts is said to mean "the contortions" and others to mean "(I) dance" in the Duala language, originated from a Duala dance called the kossa. Emmanuel Nelle Eyoum started using the refrain kossa kossa in his songs with his group "Los Calvinos". The style began to take shape in the 1950s though the first recordings were not seen until a decade later. There were artists such as Eboa Lotin, François Missé Ngoh and especially Manu Dibango, who popularised makossa throughout the world with his song "Soul Makossa" in 1972. It is the most sampled African song, in history to date. The chant from the song, mamako, mamasa, maka makossa, was later used by Michael Jackson in "Wanna Be Startin' Somethin'" in 1983. In 2007, Rihanna similarly sampled it too for "Don't Stop The Music". Many other performers followed suit. The 2010 World Cup also brought makossa to the international stage as Shakira sampled the Golden Sounds popular song "Zamina mina (Zangalewa)".

== Etymology ==
The word "makossa" originated from the Duala words "m'a" and "kossa". "Kossa" is a term that was a term at the edge of neologism expressed initially as a cry of exhortation, and as "a kind of swear word that has the status of a stimulus, a spur." In the book Le Makossa: une musique africaine moderne, a passage including this quote is written as follows:

En effet, le terme Makossa, dérive de « m'a kossa » qui veut dire littéralement en langue duala et au pluriel les contorsions; au singulier « di kossa » la contorsion. Ce vocable « Kossa » est un terme à la lisière du néologisme et du cri d'exhortation, mieux, une sorte de juron ayant statut de stimulus, d'aiguillon.
Indeed, the term Makossa derives from "m'a kossa," which literally means contortions in the Duala language, and in the plural, "di kossa," meaning contortion. This word "Kossa" is a term bordering on neologism and a cry of exhortation, or rather, a kind of oath serving as a stimulus, a goad.

In the same book, the author explains that according to the late journalist Remy Minko Mba:

Kossa is a kind of exclamation, a cry of joy that is usually uttered to give more vigor, [and] more energy to the dance.

In the original French version, a passage including the translated version of this quote reads:

Kossa est une sorte d'exclamation, un cri de joie que l'on pousse généralement pour donner plus de vigueur, plus d'énergie à la danse. Il s'agit donc d'une sorte de stimulus qui doit nécessairement provoquer une réaction positive.

In Cameroonian Pidgin English, a cognate that could be one of the ultimate underlying origins of the word "makossa" is "kosh". One of the definitions of this word is "to insult, abuse, curse, swear at", which is the context of the origin of the word makossa.

== Origins ==
Before the word "makossa" existed, the music emerged in the late 19th century.

The term makossa was coined by Nelle Eyoum. He did this when casually shouting out "kossa kossa" to children who would dance in reaction. This is akin to shouts of exhortation to children in daily life. This was to stimulate partners on the dance floor to redouble or increase their fervency in the dance, especially during the frenzied part of the composition, commonly called "secousse" or "balle à terre".

But even though Nelle Eyoum coined the term, they were others who played a significant role in the developing of the music. In the mid-1960s, Ekambi Brillant set the pattern for makossa through his popular recordings. These include musicians such as Lobe Lobe Rameau, Mouelle Guillaume, Ebanda Manfred, Tibo Essombe, Epee Mbende Richard, Eitel Tobbo, Ebolo Emmanuel, Charles Lembe, Ruth Soppo, Jacqueline Ewondo, Tapelon, Epata, Eyoum Decca, Willy le Pape, etc.

=== Early development ===
Makossa developed, expanded and evolved into a widely played modern music genre in Cameroon. Its influence shaped and altered the musical discourse in the country for more than half a century, so much so that its reach expanded far beyond the nation's borders to other parts of West and Central Africa. It is the rhizomic evolutionary offshoot of the musical confluence arising from the colonial era and its revolutionary relationship between the West and sub-Saharan Africa in the 18th century.

Along with this came variegated cultural ideas and expressions, intellectual concepts, religious values, as well as radical and disruptive new technologies from Europe that were at the presence of African societies. The outcome was a plethora of newer musical forms and modes of expression along the coast of West and Central Africa. Like the Kru people of Sierra Leone and Liberia, business people, migrant workers, travelers, and musicians who were from the French Congo also brought along another stream of music with them to Douala.

This junction between "old Africa and a new world of modernity" produced new auditory and visual frontiers. It allowed for a sensory experiential interface which culminated into a wide array of artistic and contemporary forms in West and Central Africa previously unknown. It was out of this milieu that makossa would emerge, in one which was being shaped by new experimental forms that would influence the entire continent.

Makossa originated when Nelle Eyoum combined the experiences of Douala ambasse bey, Bassa assiko, and Ghanaian and Nigerian highlife and shouted exclamations to stimulate dancing by children in the 1950s.

=== Ethnogenesis ===
==== Assiko ====
Assiko is a music genre that is found in the Littoral, Centre, South, and North-West Regions of Cameroon. Its many forms are due to the fact that at each region corresponds a particular form of assiko, that is to say a rhythm, a harmonic and melodic course of action as well as a specific orchestration. It is thus that we distinguish a hard assiko, "muscular", rapid and lilting like Bassa Assiko and Eton Assiko; a cool assiko like Bulu Assiko; and the "Bottle dance" of the North-West Region. However, whether it is Bassa, Eton, Bulu, or from the North-West, assiko has a standard organology, namely the usage of the sound of the bottle as idiophone for percussion, to the point of bringing the violinist Jean-Luc Ponty to call it the "Bottle-bop".

The specific mode that is of interest is Bassa Assiko because of its influence on makossa. In effect, it is characterized by an accelerated rhythm, syncopated and jerky. The solo guitar is very predominant as well as the percussion. The solo guitar plays diverse roles of accompaniment and of successive chorus sandwiched with singing. With attentive listening, makossa is a slowed-down assiko. Certain works of Nkotti Francois unveil with eloquence this influence of assiko; for example the song, "Mintoa Mintutu". The producer Toto Guillaume was accused by Jean Bikoko Aladin of plagiarism: Aladin's 1982 Disque D'Or song "Dibena" was simply slowed down by Guillaume to create the assiko song "Samedi Soir".

==== Sociopolitical context ====
The emergence of makossa is historically contemporary to the fight for independence. The emerging indigenous elite was crossed by the breath of an independence solidly leaned on the desire of cultural sovereignty. A manner of returning to the sources maintained by the current of the negritude, racial activism and black American politics. The departure of colonists passed as well by way of the decolonization of a cultural space and music dominated by the waltz, jerk, twist, and classical music. Moreover, the creation of places dedicated to relaxation such as the famous "palm wine bars" - where people consumed the following local alcohol: "bilibili", "kwata beer" raphia wine, and "arki" indigenous whiskey - offered local musicians a frame of expression. Light formations (a guitarist, a percussionist, and voices), played traditional tunes. The availability of electricity and musical equipment, popular balls known as "bol", and the beginnings of urban prostitution are as many elements which constituted the embryogenesis of typical Cameroonian music in general and makossa music in particular.

=== Exogenesis ===
==== Gospel and classical songs of Baptist churches ====
Many musicians did their classes in choirs of Baptist churches before blossoming in profane music. The Duala people are by influence Protestant. Gospel and classical chants impacted the aspect of makossa concerning choirs, precisely the recourse to feminine voices.

==== Highlife ====
Highlife is a West African popular music whose origins lay in Sierra Leone, then Ghana and finally in Nigeria in the 1920s. It is a fusion of Western sounds and traditional musics. Highlife touches a multitude of styles and diverse combinations of instruments that correspond to emergent social classes as well as local traditions. The term "highlife", is revealing of the new urban culture created by colonialism.

In 1930, distinct varieties existed along the West African coast. Two major styles emerged: the dance orchestra with brass instruments as well as other Western instruments; and groups more popular with dominant guitar and some musicians. It is this second style that influenced makossa as far as guitaristic texture and harmonic structure.

==== Merengue ====
Merengue has its origins in the Dominican Republic in the 19th century. It originated with African instruments, notably drums. It later progressively incorporated Western instruments such as the accordion and, more recently, brass instruments. It marked almost all urban African music and Cameroonian music in particular; it was highly popular in the 1950s and 1960s. According to Joseph OWONA NTSAMA:

"Makossa of the Cameroonian coast in between 50 and 60 from the start, is musically and sociologically an ersatz of Merengue."

The tempo of merengue has particularly influenced makossa.

==== Congolese rumba ====
Original rumba was born in Cuba from the African slaves. It is a music of poor people in urban environments, of workers without wives, nor families. It is a fusion of Spanish fandango, biguine, merengue, mambo, chachacha, and calypso. Ever since its first appearance in Cuba, rumba accomplished its triangular path via America-Europe-Africa to finally root itself in Africa, notably in the Congo where it mixed with highlife to support the fight for African independences. It changed quite a bit in the Congo.

In effect, by sebene, it becomes more fluid and rhythmic. It has left a considerable melodic imprint on makossa. Pioneers of makossa were lulled by the guitaristic fingering of the couturiers of rumba. Vicky LONGOMBA, Docteur NICO, FRANCO, VERKYS, Franklin BOUKAKA, the orchestras "African-Jazz", "OK Jazz", "les bantus de la capitale", "les grands maquisards", etc. were their paradigms. Certain guitar phrases were not more or less than retakes of rumba solos. Congolese music has more than all other exterior influences marked its imprint on makossa for it was the most diffused at that era thanks to the almighty "Radio Léopoldville".

Moreover, the trip to Douala between 1966 and 1967 of the orchestra "Cercul jazz" from Brazzaville, would prove for eight months in a productive stay that rumba could be sung in Duala. This would contribute to its influence on makossa.

==== The funky-disco movement: The Motown Sound ====
Tired of the "cool jazz" at that period, many African-American musicians in the years between 1954 and 1960 advocated the return to the strength of a more "muscular" jazz coincided with the hatching of rock'n'roll among young white people. Directly inspired by bebop, this hard jazz planted its roots at the sources of African rhythm.

Moreover, this jazz took spiritual inspiration within the gospel genre and the religious music of African-Americans. The funk which comes from this synthesis was successful in the music industry, and later was amplified by its similar sound to soul and disco. Certain icons would serve as a "school" in the basic formation of future stars of makossa: James Brown, the Bee-Gees, Kool and the Gang, T. Connection, Donna Summer, Village People, Gloria Gaynor, ABBA, the Temptations, Shalamar, the Commodores, Ike and Tina Turner, Percy Sledge, Boney-M, Smokey Robinson.

The funky-disco movement influenced makossa via the use of the aerophones, or the brass and woodwind instruments; the bass playing and to a certain extent the beat of the drum kit. The bassists include Joe TONGO, LONG Manfred, Jeannot Karl DIKOTO MANDENGUE, Vicky EDIMO, and ALADJI TOURE. The influence of the funky-disco movement besides its purely technical and orchestral aspect, also affected the onomastics of makossa musicians. In effect, many purely and simply adopted American names: Peter Moukoko, Bill Loko, Jimmy Sax, Peter Makossa, Jackson Berry, Vicky Edimo, Peter Mpouly, Tim and Foty, Jimmy Takoube, Black Styls, Joe Mboule, Joe Etonde, Peter Yamson, Georges Dickson, Mike Kounou, Blacks Styls, Negro Styls, Cracks, Chancellor, etc.

==== French pop influence ====
In Cameroon, the influence of French music was evident. The French colonizers arrived in Cameroon and there imparted in that territory a list of different musical forms, which can be categorized under the umbrella of French pop and chansons. Chansons is a term which is from the French word for "song". The music influenced makossa slows, also known as Cameroon slows, which were known for their ballad-like, romantic cadence and sentimental harmonies and lyrics. The lyrics were often, like makossa in general, sung in Duala or French. These songs were particularly based on the French slows that were popular at the time. Singers of this style include Tino Rossi, Eddy Mitchell, and Sacha Distel, whose style of singing further indirectly influenced the development of makossa.

Georges Collinet, a Cameroonian-born radio broadcaster, was known for the creation of Maxi voum voum. This radio program would jumpstart the popularity of makossa by making it known to international audiences. Parisian radio stations made makossa available to their audiences, and this led to a global distribution of the music. The music evolved and this gave way to different styles in the music. Record labels, which were in France, created a recipe for international fame and allowed the exiled Cameroonian musicians to set the blueprint for their success.

== Musicians ==
=== 1950s ===
In the early 1950s, African soldiers such as Cameroonians marched north through the Sahara Desert and North Africa to Europe to fight the descendants of German colonizers in African regions such as Kamerun. This led to the musicians who were enlisted to fight for the French against the Nazis, the latter being those Germans. The result was that the soldiers and military musicians would play music at venues called discotheques. Assiko was played at these places. It was psychotherapeutic to these individuals because they had most likely seen extremely traumatic events, from war killings, to sexual violence, and otherwise war crimes on the battlefield, as seen in essewe, with which these musicians played music from Sawaland in colonial Cameroon. In fighting these negative events and consequences of war, the musician performed music that literally was tailor composed based on the academic, musical, psychological, physiological, anatomical, biological, physical, social, mathematical, tactical, linguistic, and athletic aspects and elemental fundamentals, showcasing the further ability for these military personnel in their successes.

Bernard Dikoume and Jean Bikoko Aladin among others recorded makossa music in the 1950s that was played in the discotheques in France that those in the Nazi occupation resorted to playing. The later musicians such as Samson "Chaud Gars" and Eboa Lotin would follow and the latter would perfect it.

The music theory of it was the use of major chords, guitaristic fingering, and I-IV-V-IV or I-V-IV-V, and the sebene as well as the musical workings that includes different techniques, such as Sprechgesang, and different musical formats such as the aria, and the supplementing of the instruments in this such as the timbre becoming key in the aspects of the music, including the human voice (vocals), which maneuver the vocabulary of the individual through to the vocabulary of the plurality, in a way that relentlessly incorporates various musical themes that can only add to makossa, according to Nelle Eyoum, and the purpose being thus established with the lyrics that entertain and with the language plus the order with which they are sung and/or spoken.

Musicians engage with these audiences, and these parties resemble the 'bol' ballroom dance culture of Cameroon. It was a combination of Bulu and German influences. Musicians became clearer with this culture because it was clearly evident that people needed to find solace and a break and a way to relax when not in war. It was the result of bolobo, which was a dance as an initiation test for sexual life and marital life. This was done by taking musical resistance that was homogenous musical theme, and working one's way around it with a joyful heart, expressing this joy through relentless musical energy (i.e., fast crescendos, unpredictable glissandos and this in part due to the uneven characteristics of the notes, thereby creating a musical balance and hence resolution).

This was a reflection of the Portuguese, Spanish, French, British, Dutch, Scandinavian and German (the later fusing to Belgian music that would feed to Cameroonian music in turn), Swiss, West Indian, Latin American, and U.S. etc. music, thus making for the access to the different music that left them with their European forefathers. Fifes, bagpipes, fiddles (violins), flutes, hand drums, trumpets, and early horns were some of the instruments that were being played. African slaves on board of ships on the Bight of Biafra were forced to "dance" to the performing of music with this using these instruments and playing music with them. Quadrilles were often played as well as waltzes.
