= Assiko =

Popular dance in the south of Cameroon

The Assiko is a popular dance from the South of Cameroon.

Originally based in the Bassa country, this rhythmed dance takes its name from two words: ISI, changed into ASSI, which means earth or ground; and KOO meaning foot.

The Assiko is danced dressed in a simple T-shirt and a full skirt with a pronounced, billowing waistline that emphasizes hip movement.

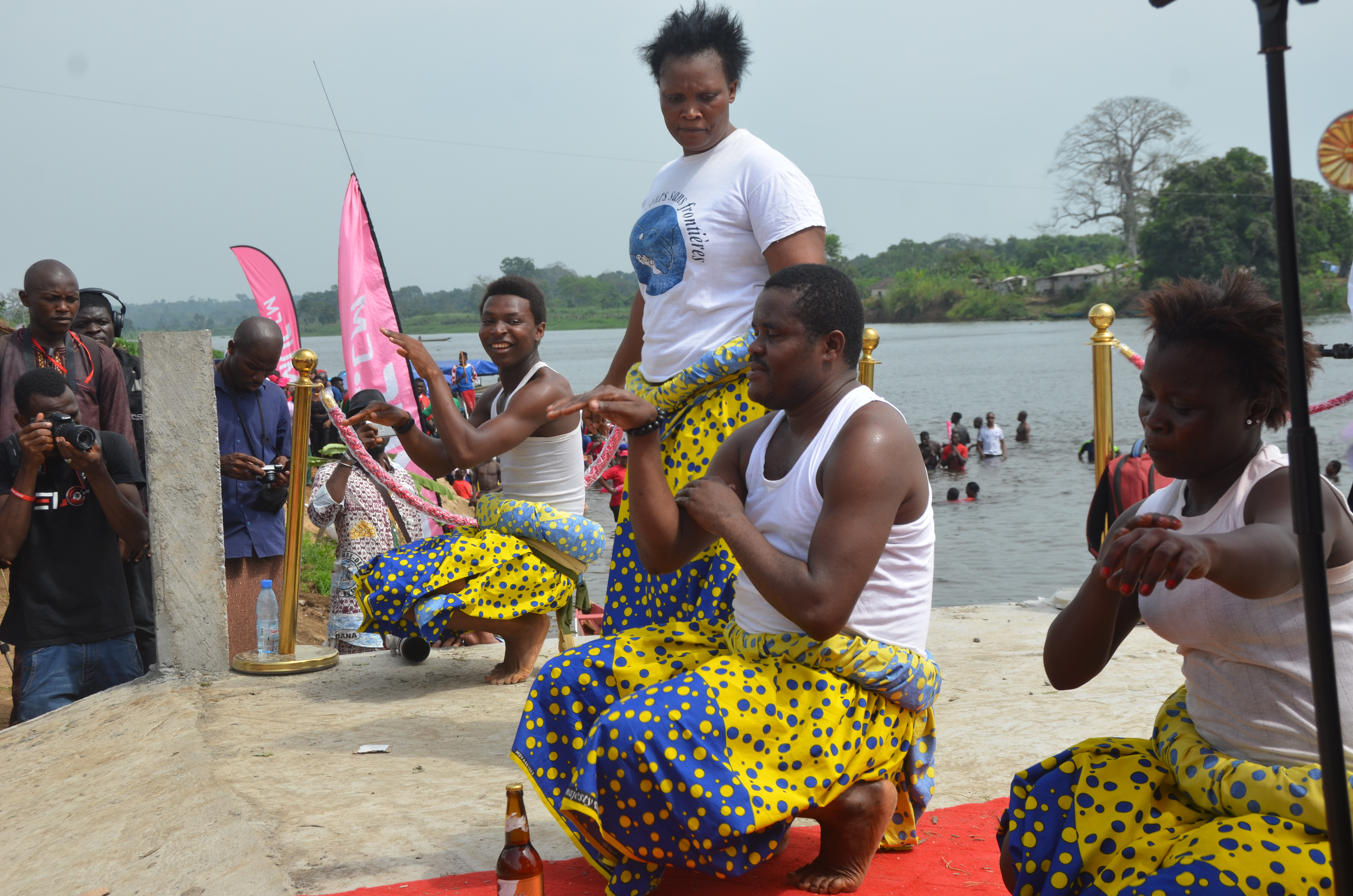
Assiko at the Ngondo Festival

The choreographies of Assiko use several lop-sided walks, successive small close walks that the dancers make at different heights, standing up or crouching, which makes you feel they float on the stage. There are also demonstrations of sense of balance, contortions and physical strength calling to the exhilalaration of dance or trance.

The Assiko is also a musical style. The band is usually based on a singer accompanied with a guitar, and a percussionist playing the pulsating rhythm of Assiko with metal knives and forks on an empty bottle. Double bass, drums and some brass can complete this base. Leds Jean Bikoko "Aladin is the creator of this rhythm is one of the well known assiko artist of Cameroon.

Demonstration of Assiko during the Mbog Liaa Festival

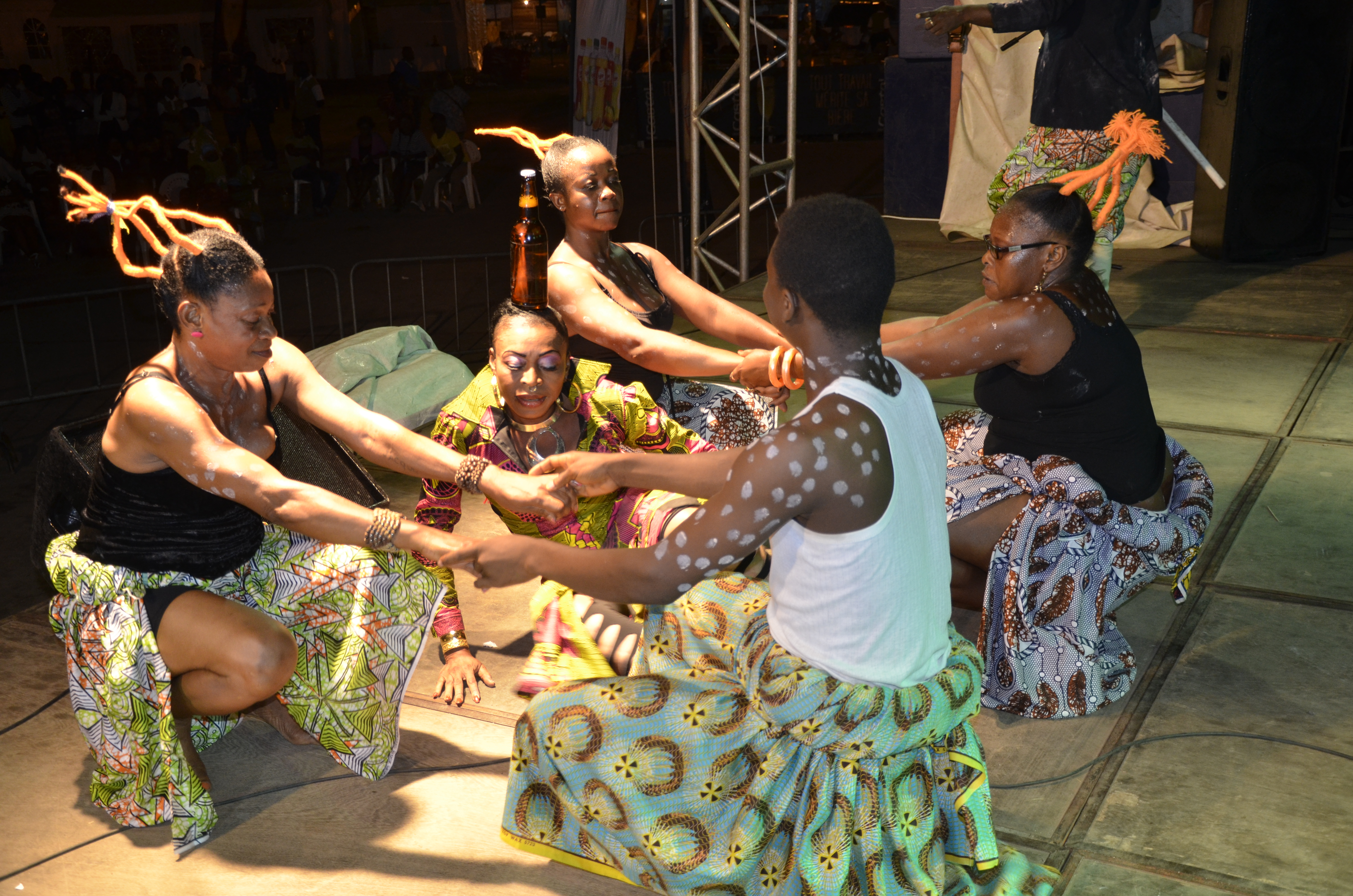

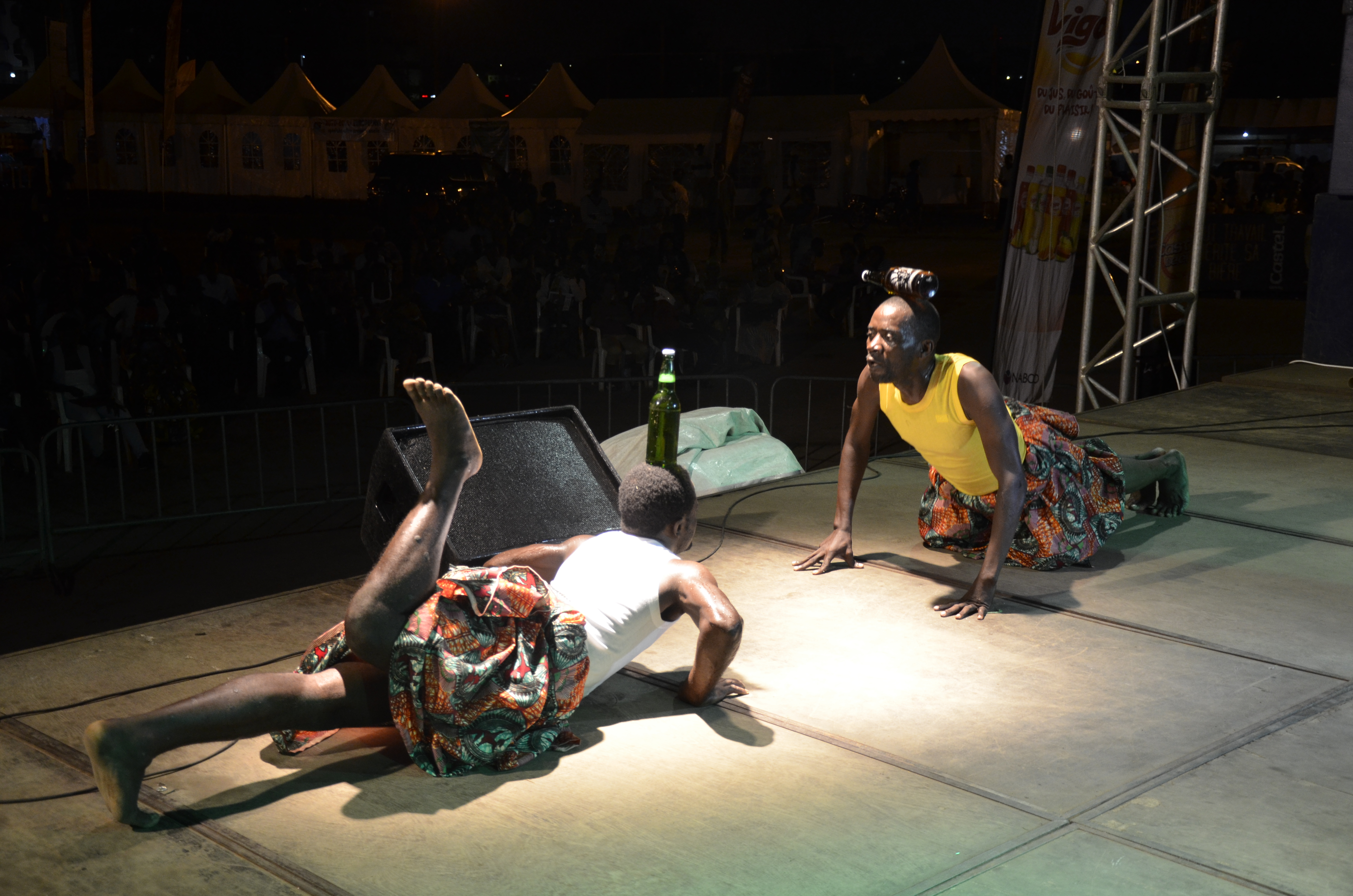

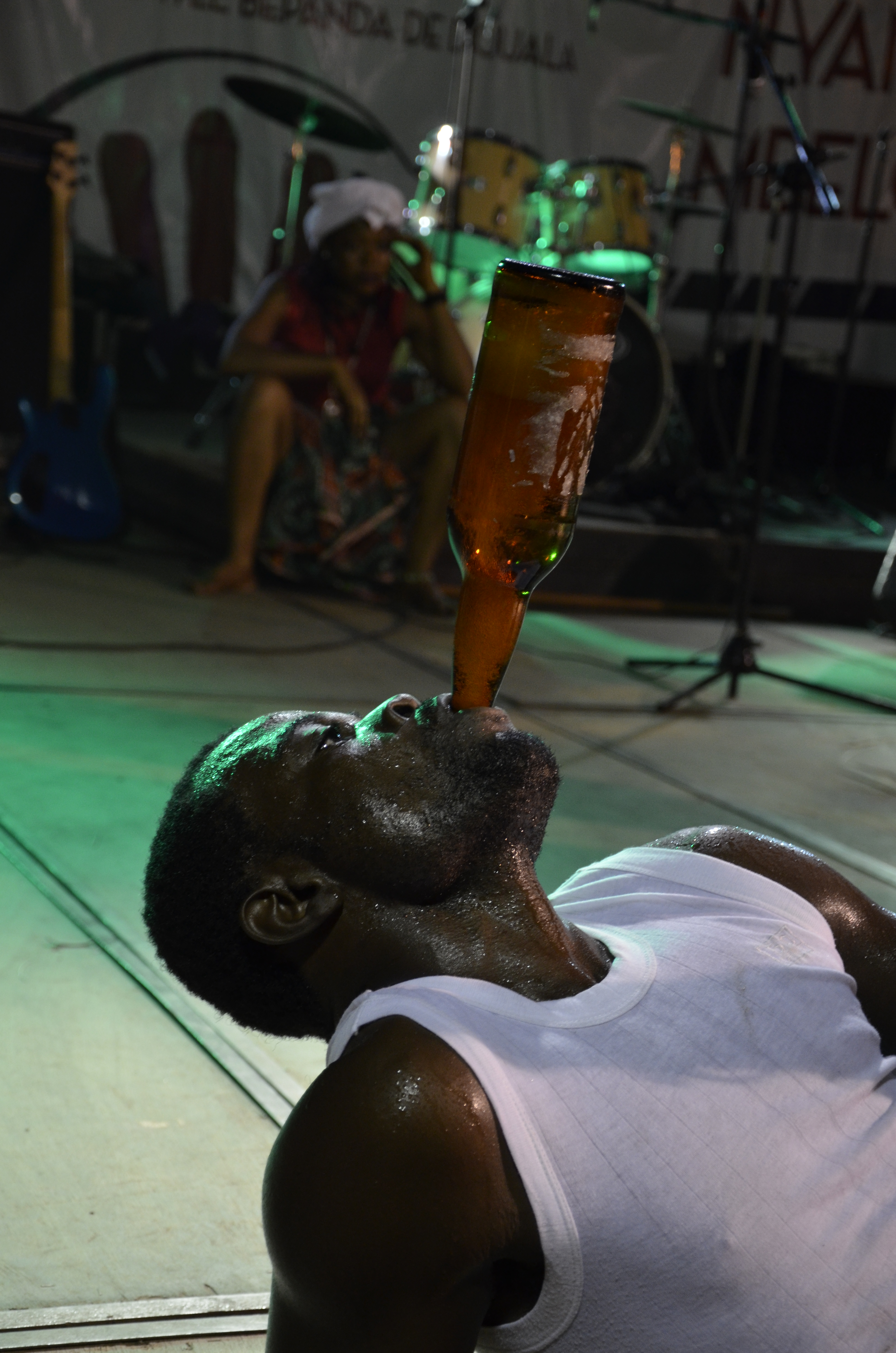

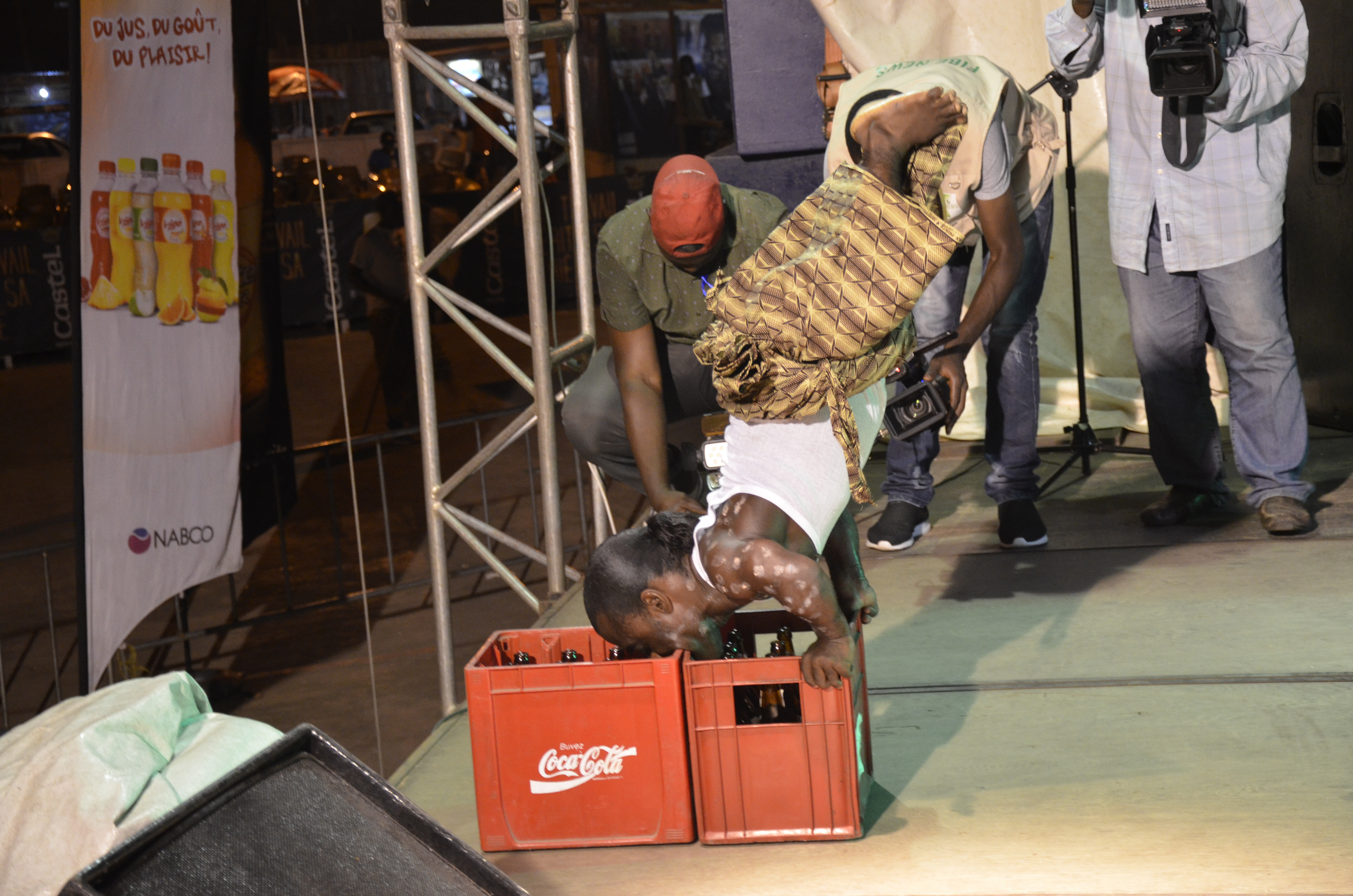

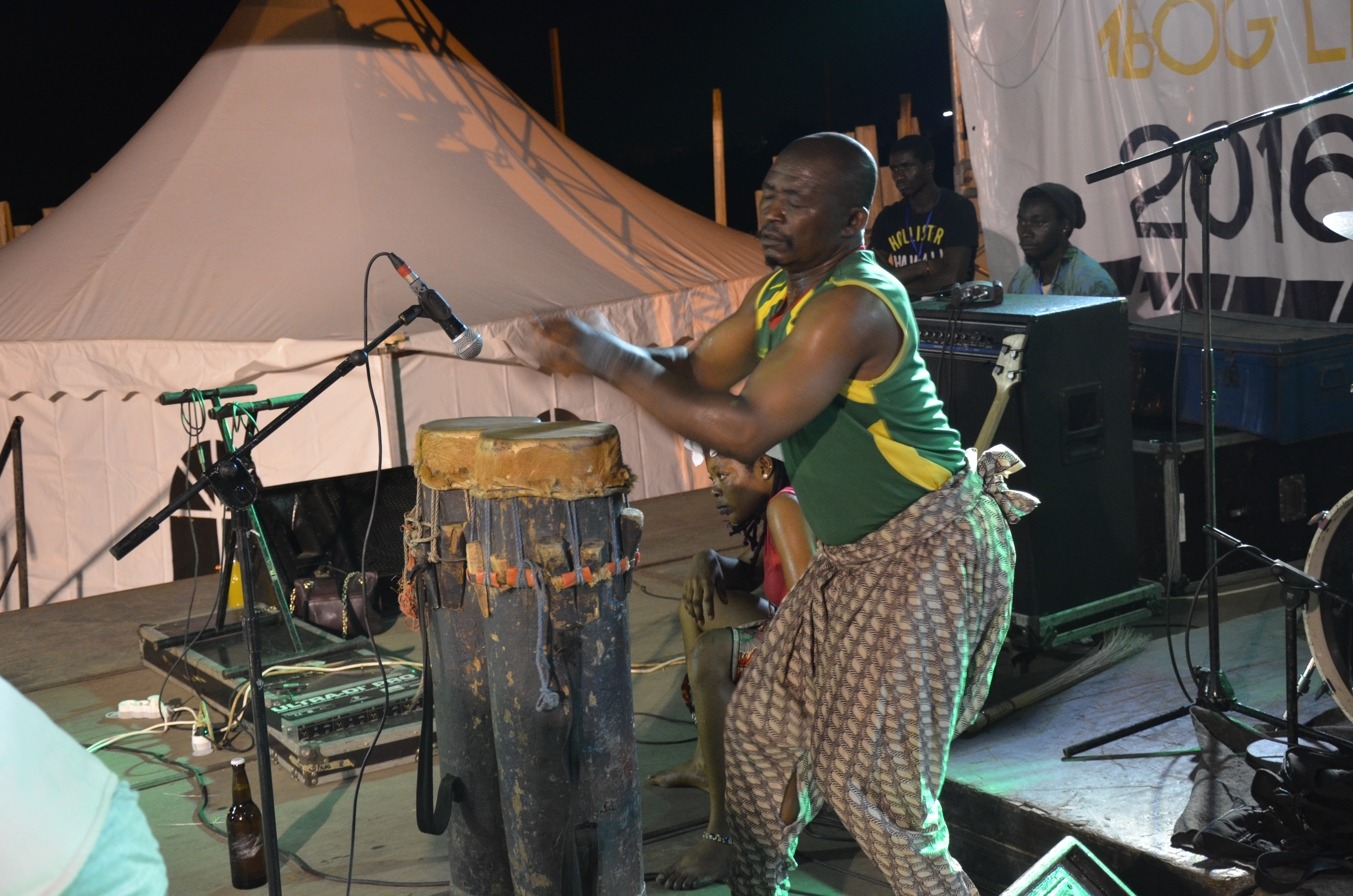

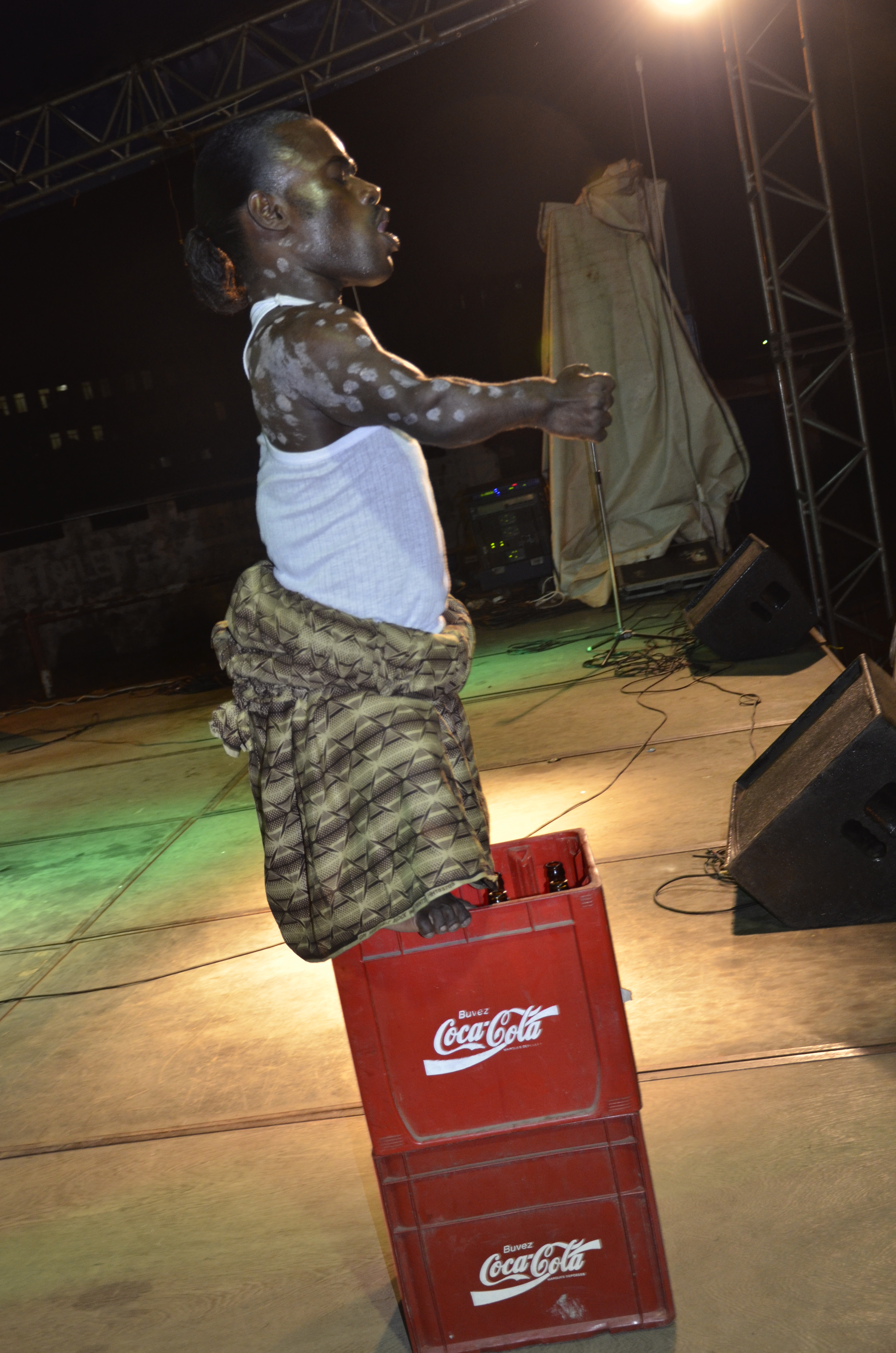

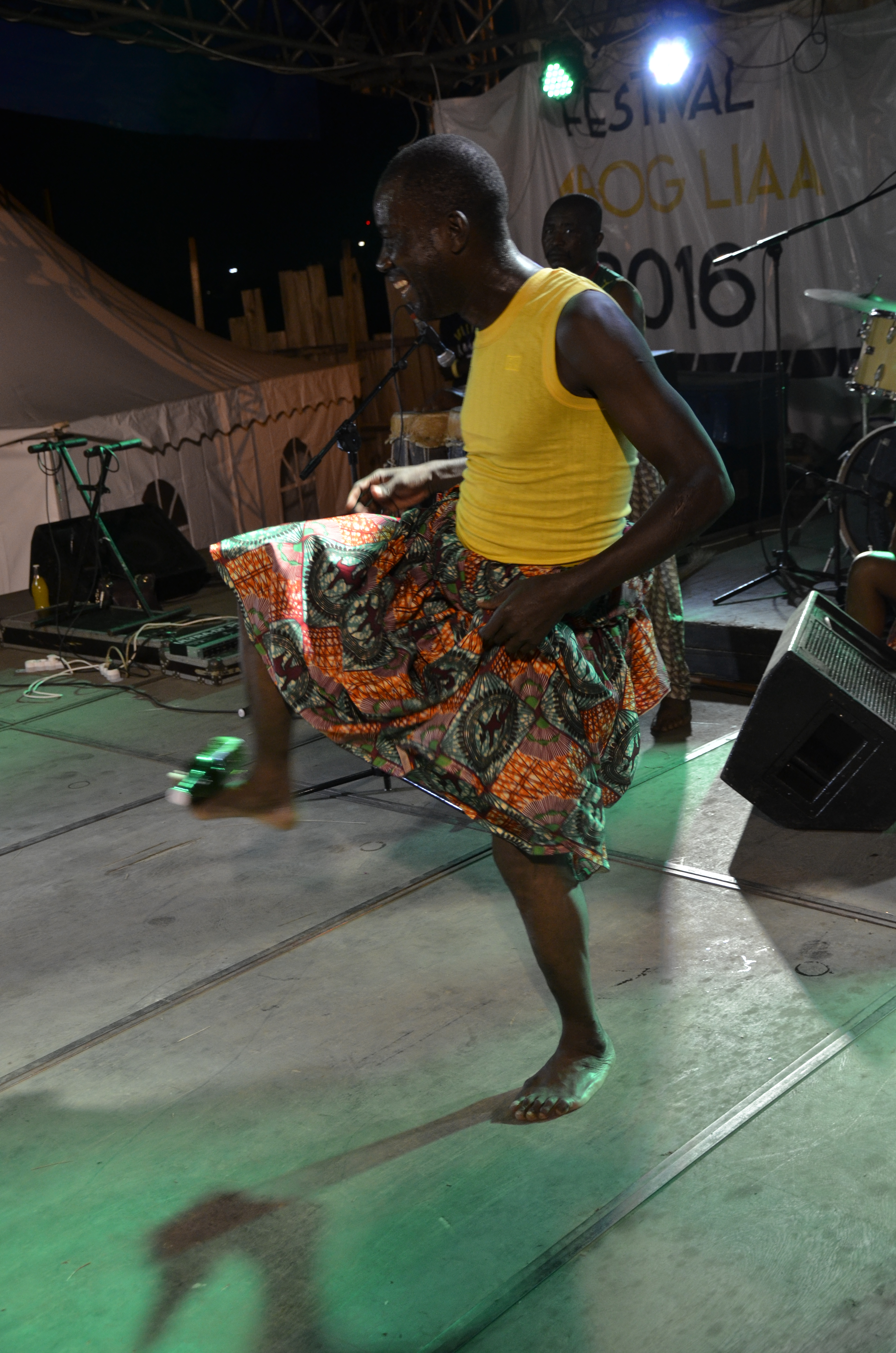

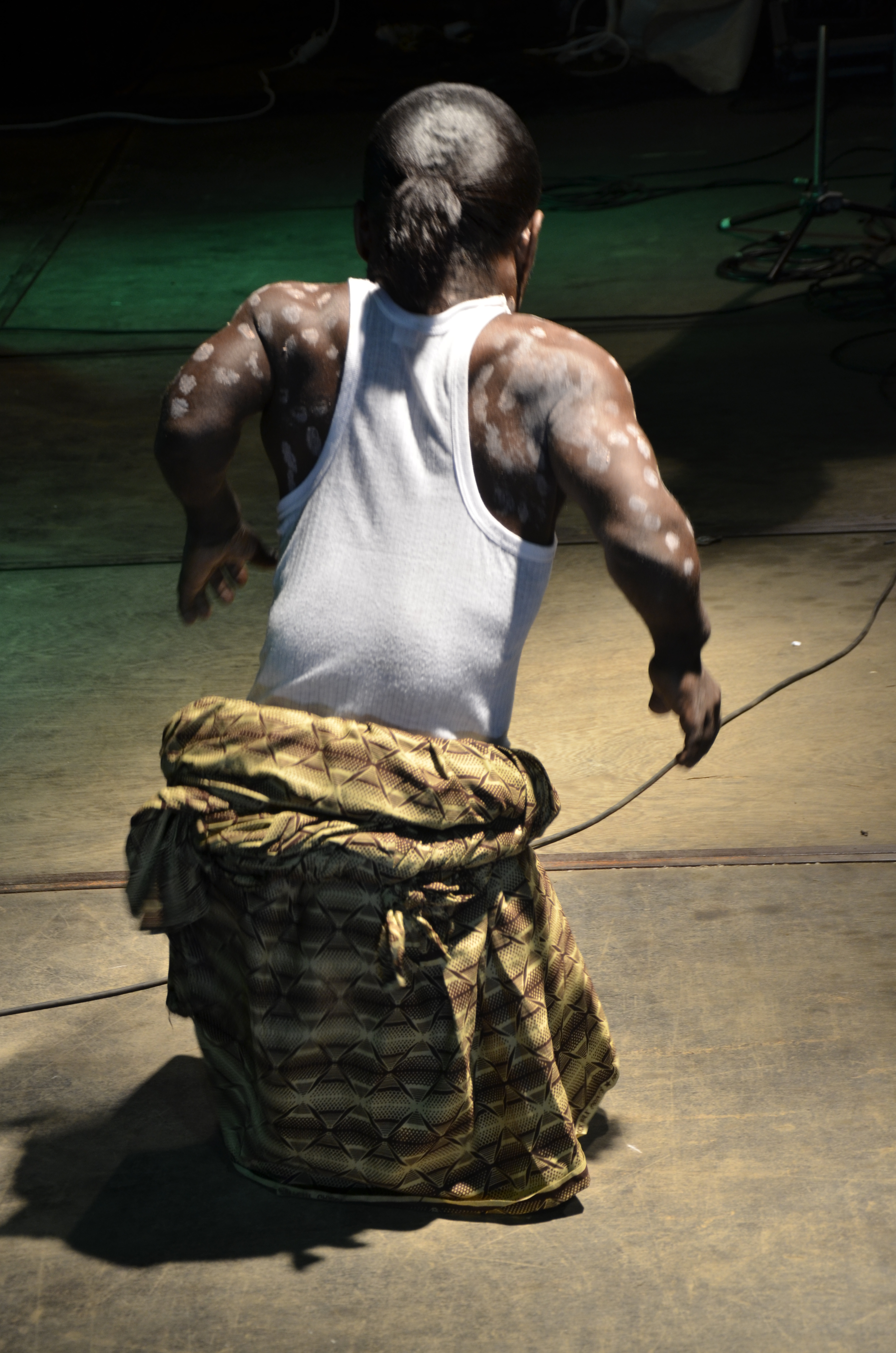

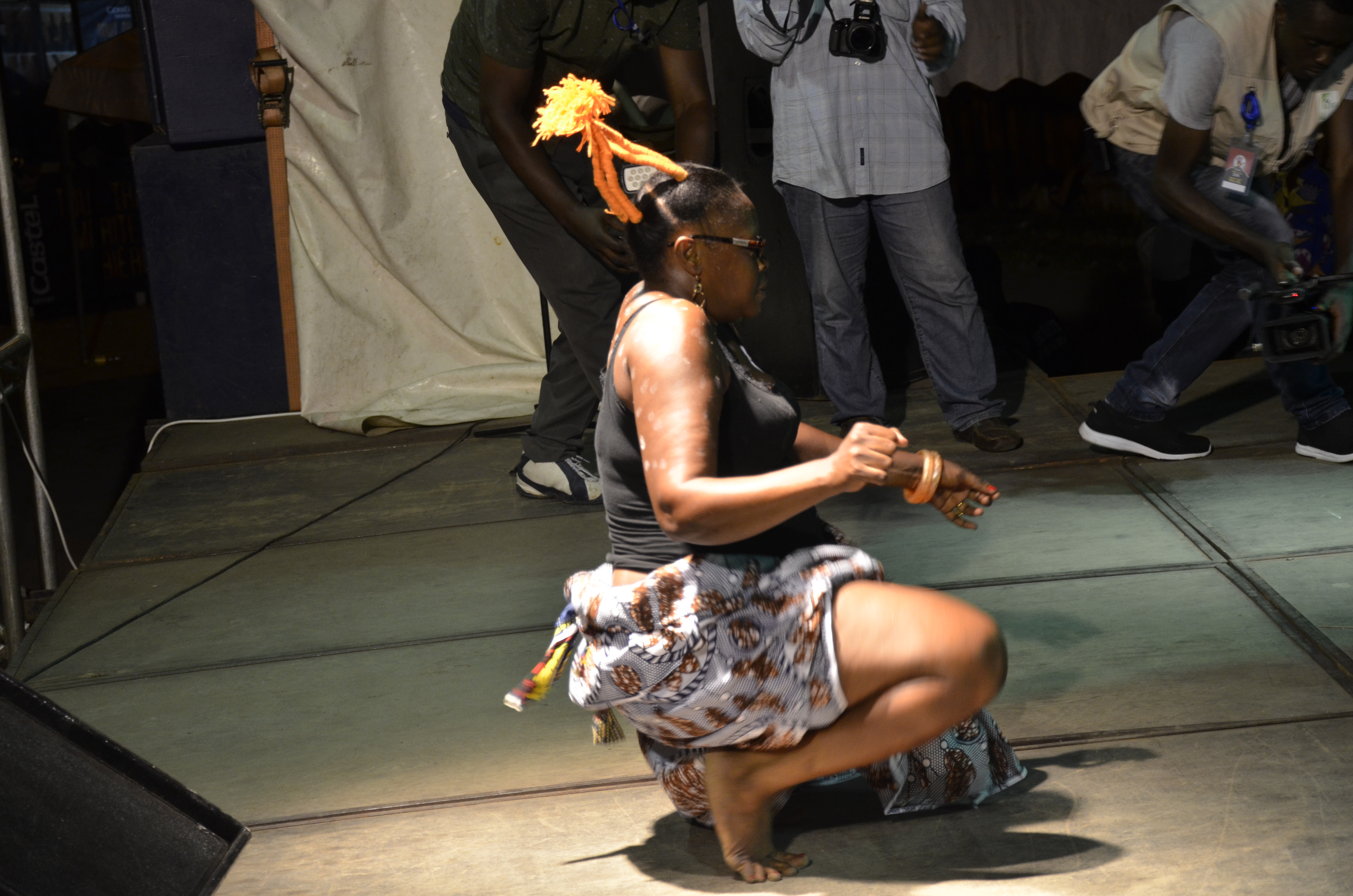

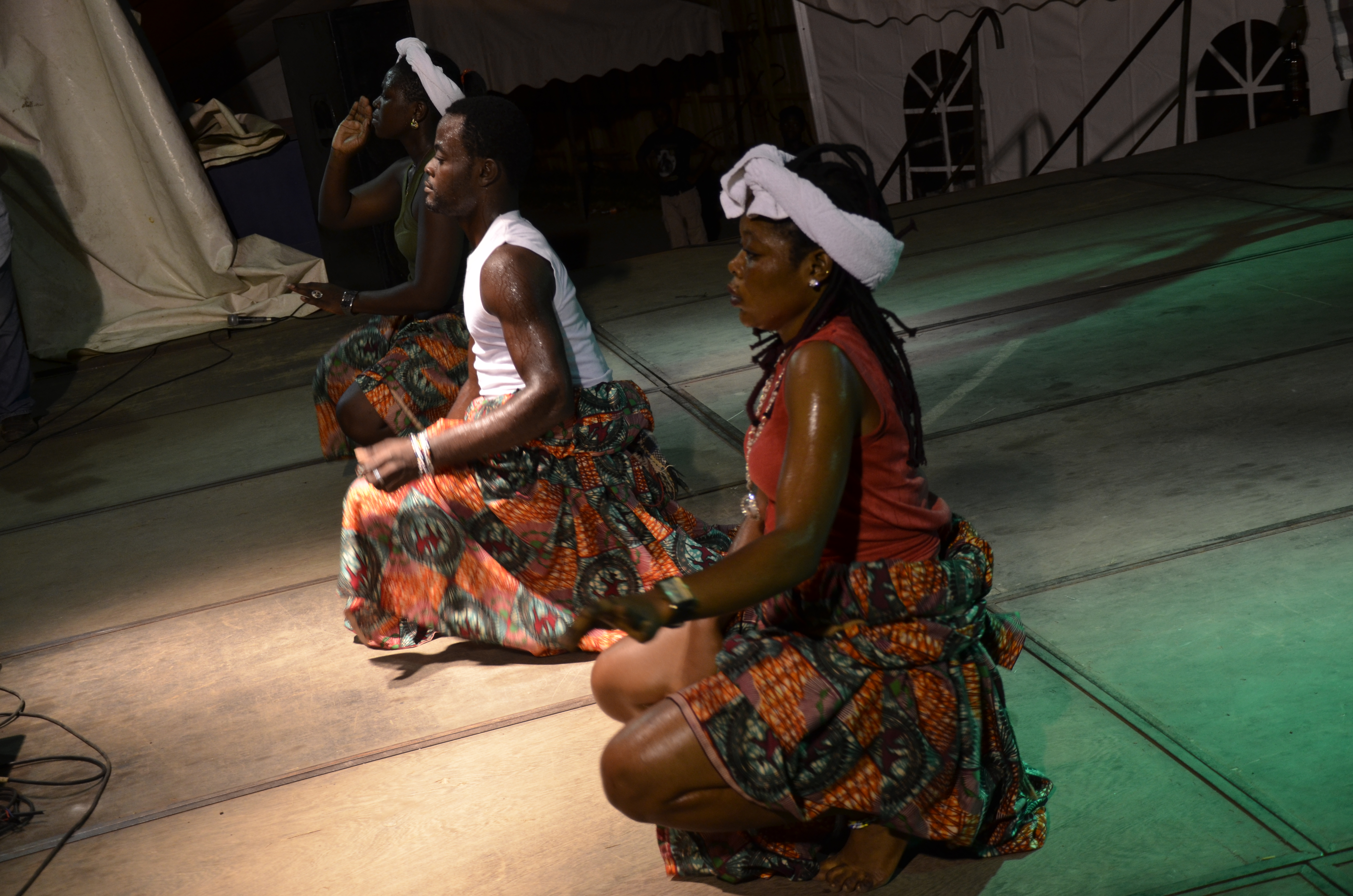

== History ==
Assiko is a local variant of palm wine music (see Sierra Leone). It was played on acoustic guitar, percussion and bottle, with an up-tempo beat. It was played around the time of independence, though it originated over 100 years ago. It bears similarities to Maringa and Juju, and from migrations to Senegal by Bassa people in Cameroon, went on to influence Senegalese music.
