= List of political parties in Cameroon =

This article lists the various political parties in Cameroon.

Cameroon is a one party dominant state with the Cameroon People's Democratic Movement in power. While opposition parties are allowed, they are widely considered to have no real chance of gaining power.

== Parties represented in the National Assembly ==
Party	Abbr.	Leader	Political position	Ideology	Assembly
Cameroon People's Democratic Movement; Rassemblement démocratique du peuple camerounais	CPDM; RDPC	Paul Biya	Big tent	Nationalism; Francophilia; Right-wing populism	149 / 180
National Union for Democracy and Progress; Union nationale pour la démocratie et le progrès	NUDP; UNDP	Maigari Bello Bouba	Right-wing	Democratic capitalism; Anti-communism	7 / 180
Social Democratic Front; Front social démocrate	SDF; FSD	Joshua Osih	Centre-left	Social democracy	6 / 180
Cameroonian Party for National Reconciliation; Parti camerounais pour la réconciliation nationale	CPNR; PCRN	Cabral Libii			5 / 180
Cameroon Democratic Union; Union démocratique du Cameroun	UDC	Patricia Tomaïno Ndam Njoya		Anti-corruption; Decentralization	4 / 180
Cameroon National Salvation Front; Front pour le salut national du Cameroun	CNSF; FSNC	Issa Tchiroma		Economic liberalism	3 / 180
Movement for the Defence of the Republic; Mouvement pour la défense de la République	MDR	Dakolé Daïssala			2 / 180
Union of Socialist Movements; Union des mouvements socialistes	USM; UMS			Social democracy	2 / 180

== Other parties ==
- Cameroonian's Republican and Patriots Party (CRPP) -Amadou Sidiki
- (Movement Patriotique du Salut Camerounais) (MPSC) - Aboubakary Siddiki.
- Respect Unity for all African Integration (Rufasca, Ambazonians, Southern Cameroonians) - Oussama Al-Suhaiqi.
- Union of the Peoples of Cameroon (Union des Populations du Cameroun) - Cecil Odhiambo.
- Cameroonian Party of Democrats (Parti des Démocrates Camerounais) - Mohammed El-Maghrabi (Petu)*
- Alliance for Democracy and Development (Alliance pour la Démocratie et le Développement) - Marcel Yondo*
- Cameroon Reformation Party (CRP-Party) - Foligar Kum Lang
- Parti Republicain du Cameroun (Republican Party of Cameroon) - Georges Gilbert Baongla
- African Peoples Union (Union des Populations Africaines -UPA)
- Progressive Movement (Mouvement Progressiste)
- Believe in Cameroon (Croire au Cameroun)- Bernard Njonga
- Cameroon Renaissance Movement (Mouvement pour la Renaissance du Cameroun) - Tiriane Balbine Noah
