= Progressive Movement (Cameroon) =

Political party in Cameroon

Progressive Movement Mouvement Progressiste
- General Coordinator: Christiane Moullende
- Founder: Jean-Jacques Ekindi
- Founded: 23 August 1991; 35 years ago
- Headquarters: Douala, Cameroon
- Ideology: Progressivism
- Colors: Purple
- Senate: 0 / 100
- National Assembly: 0 / 180

The Progressive Movement (French: Mouvement Progressiste, MP) is a minor opposition political party in Cameroon. It was formed on 23 August 1991 by Jean-Jacques Ekindi. The party emerged as an opposition movement to the ruling Cameroon People's Democratic Movement (CPDM).

Following Ekindi's resignation from the party in April 2020 and his return to the CPDM, the MP underwent a period of internal reorganization. Christiane Moullende was elected coordinator-general of the party at its fifth convention in May 2024.

As of 2026, the MP remains a political party but has no representation in the National Assembly. Its recent activities have focused on organizational restructuring and electoral mobilization.

== History ==
The Progressive Movement was formed on 23 August 1991 by Jean-Jacques Ekindi. Ekindi was the party's candidate in the 1992 presidential election, officially receiving 0.79% of the vote and placing fifth.

An MP meeting at the Bepanda Omnisport Stadium in Douala on 21 May 1994 was banned by the government. When party members attempted to hold the meeting despite the ban, several were beaten by security forces.

Ekindi again ran as the party's presidential candidate in the 2004 presidential election. On 10 October, he announced his withdrawal from the election in favor of John Fru Ndi, the candidate of the main opposition party, the Social Democratic Front (SDF). His name nevertheless remained on the ballot, and he placed 13th out of 16 candidates with 0.27% of the vote.

In the 2007 parliamentary election, Ekindi was elected to the National Assembly from the Wouri Centre constituency in Littoral Region, where the MP received 22.43% of the vote and won one of the three available seats. Ekindi was the only member of the party elected in the 2007 election.Shortly before the election, on 18 July 2007, the MP formalized an alliance with the Cameroonian Democratic Union (UDC); under the agreement, the parties decided not to field candidates in the same constituencies. The alliance between the MP and the SDF also broke down around the election, with Ekindi saying that the SDF had decided to field candidates in Wouri Centre despite the alliance.

Following Ekindi's resignation from the MP on 30 April 2020 and his return to the ruling Cameroon People's Democratic Movement, the party entered a period of internal uncertainty over its leadership. Hilaire Nzipan, who had served as the party's national secretary for communications, assumed an interim leadership role. On 6 January 2024, Nzipan was designated to continue overseeing the party pending the resolution of questions concerning its statutes and leadership.

In March 2024, Ekindi, despite having resigned from the MP, announced plans to convene the party's fifth extraordinary convention in Douala. He said that the convention would formally take note of his resignation, acknowledge the vacancy in the party's executive leadership and elect a new coordinator-general. Nzipan contested Ekindi's authority to convene the convention, arguing that Ekindi was no longer a member of the MP and that the party's statutes provided other procedures for convening a leadership meeting. The dispute resulted in competing claims to the party's leadership.

The convention was subsequently held in Douala on 4 May 2024. Christiane Moullende, a member of the party since 2007, was elected coordinator-general by acclamation. Ekindi's resignation was formally recorded at the convention. Moullende announced that her priorities would include increasing voter registration and restructuring the party's organization down to the local cells. Nzipan rejected the outcome of the convention and continued to claim leadership of the MP, arguing that the procedure used to elect Moullende was contrary to the party's statutes.

The dispute continued into preparations for the 2025 presidential election. Nzipan was selected as the candidate of the MP and was initially included among the 13 candidates approved by Elections Cameroon (ELECAM). Moullende, who disputed his authority to represent the party, filed a petition with the Constitutional Council challenging his candidacy. On 5 August 2025, the Constitutional Council upheld Moullende's petition and invalidated Nzipan's candidacy, finding that he did not have the requisite authority to stand as the MP's candidate. The decision left the MP without a candidate in the presidential election.

== Election results ==
=== Presidential elections ===
Election	Candidate	Votes	'%	Result
1992	Jean-Jacques Ekindi	23,525	0.79%	Lost ✗
1997	Did not participate			
2004	Jean-Jacques Ekindi	10,158	0.27%	Lost ✗
2011	Jean-Jacques Ekindi	21,593	0.45%	Lost ✗
2018	Did not participate			
2025	Did not participate			

=== National Assembly elections ===
Election	Leader	Votes	%	Seats	+/–	Position	Status
1992	Jean-Jacques Ekindi	Did not participate		0 / 180	—	—	Extra-parliamentary
1997	Jean-Jacques Ekindi	Did not participate		0 / 180	—	—	Extra-parliamentary
2002	Jean-Jacques Ekindi	Did not participate		0 / 180	—	—	Extra-parliamentary
2007	Jean-Jacques Ekindi	3,942	0.13	1 / 180	1	13th	Opposition
2013	Jean-Jacques Ekindi	14,126	0.35	0 / 180	▼0	▲12th	Extra-parliamentary
2020	Jean-Jacques Ekindi	Did not participate		0 / 180	—	—	Extra-parliamentary
