= 2013 Cameroonian parliamentary election =

2013 parliament election in Cameroon

- 30 September 2013
- All 180 seats in the National Assembly; 91 seats needed for a majority
- Turnout: 76.79% (▲12.76pp)
Party	Leader	Vote %	Seats	+/–
RDPC	Paul Biya	63.52	148	−5
SDF	John Fru Ndi	12.65	18	+2
UNDP	Bello Bouba Maigari	11.89	5	−1
MRC	Maurice Kamto	3.54	1	New
UDC	Adamou Ndam Njoya	1.79	4	0
UPC	Pierre Sende	1.71	3	+3
MDR	Dakolé Daïssala	0.80	1	+1
This lists parties that won seats. See the complete results below.
Prime Minister before	Prime Minister after
Philémon Yang; RDPC	Philémon Yang; RDPC

Parliamentary elections were held in Cameroon on 30 September 2013, alongside local elections. They were originally scheduled for July 2012, February 2013 and July 2013, but were repeatedly postponed.

== Background ==
Following a controversial presidential election in 2011, Islamic and Christian leaders met with Samuel Fonkam Azu'u, the head of the electoral commission ELECAM, in order to push for reforms demanded by the opposition. The measures included: biometric registration of voters as the previous election had multiple and non-existing voters, a single ballot paper for presidential elections, eligibility of independent candidates, eligibility of 18-year-olds to vote from the current 20 minimum requirement, recompilation of voter registers, two-round presidential election, establishing an electoral calendar, "harmonisation" of electoral laws and a "truly independent" electoral commission. Azu'u and Prime Minister Philemon Yang then worked with leaders of various political parties, religions, traditional groups' leaders and foreign service officers to create an electoral code. Modibo Bouba Bello, the vice president of the Islamic Council, said that "it is our duty as servants of Allah to ensure that truth, transparency and justice reigns in our country, and this begins with elections in which every ballot counts," while he was supported by Reverend Sebastian Wongo Behong, the secretary general of the Cameroon Episcopal Conference, and Reverend Robert Ngoyek, the president of the Council of Protestant Churches. Behong said that "many democratising countries have frequently gone into chaos because of badly-organized elections. [The] electoral malpractices that are frequently observed in Cameroon could be leading the country towards a precipice."

== Results ==
Official results were announced on 17 October 2013, showing that the ruling Cameroon People's Democratic Movement (RDPC) had again won an overwhelming majority of seats in the National Assembly. The RDPC won 148 out of 180 seats, a slight decrease from the number of seats it won in 2007, while the main opposition party, the Social Democratic Front, won 18 seats, a slight increase. The National Union for Democracy and Progress (UNDP) won five seats and the Cameroon Democratic Union (UDC) won four. The Union of the Peoples of Cameroon (UPC) and the Movement for the Defense of the Republic (MDR), two smaller parties which had been absent from the National Assembly for a time, regained representation; the UPC won three seats and the MDR obtained a single seat. One seat was also won by the Cameroon Renaissance Movement, which obtained parliamentary representation for the first time.

Party	Votes	%	Seats	+/–
Cameroon People's Democratic Movement	2,555,689	63.52	148	–5
Social Democratic Front	508,901	12.65	18	+2
National Union for Democracy and Progress	478,503	11.89	5	–1
Cameroon Renaissance Movement	142,620	3.54	1	New
Cameroon Democratic Union	71,926	1.79	4	0
Union of the Peoples of Cameroon	68,949	1.71	3	+3
National Alliance for Democracy and Progress	34,338	0.85	0	0
Movement for the Defence of the Republic	32,218	0.80	1	+1
Cameroon National Salvation Front	28,339	0.70	0	New
People's Action Party	18,589	0.46	0	New
African Movement for New Independence and Democracy	15,771	0.39	0	0
Progressive Movement	14,126	0.35	0	–1
Democratic Patriots for the Development of Cameroon	10,386	0.26	0	New
Cameroonian National Civic Movement	8,130	0.20	0	New
Movement for Democracy and Progress	5,574	0.14	0	0
Alliance for Democracy and Development	4,487	0.11	0	0
Movement for the Liberation and Development of Cameroon	4,481	0.11	0	New
United People for Social Revolution	4,086	0.10	0	New
Bloc for the Reconstruction and Economic Independence of Cameroon	3,421	0.09	0	New
Action for Meritocracy and Equal Opportunities	3,088	0.08	0	New
Cameroon Democratic Party	2,277	0.06	0	New
Union of Democratic Forces of Cameroon	1,608	0.04	0	0
United Front of Cameroon	1,481	0.04	0	New
Democratic Public Opinion of Cameroon	1,244	0.03	0	New
Republican Patriotic Front	994	0.02	0	New
Cameroonian National Congress	766	0.02	0	New
United Democratic Party	685	0.02	0	New
Unified Socialist Party	380	0.01	0	0
National Movement for the Progress of Cameroon	236	0.01	0	0
Total	4,023,293	100.00	180	0
Valid votes	4,023,293	95.59		
Invalid/blank votes	185,503	4.41		
Total votes	4,208,796	100.00		
Registered voters/turnout	5,481,226	76.79		
Source: Elections Cameroon

== Aftermath ==
When the National Assembly began meeting for its new parliamentary term, Cavaye Yeguié Djibril, an RDPC deputy, was re-elected as President of the National Assembly on 4 November 2013. Cavayé received the votes of 150 deputies, while 23 deputies cast invalid votes. Hilarion Etong, another RDPC deputy, was also re-elected as First Vice-President. Jean-Bernard Ndongo Essomba was retained in his post as President of the RDPC Parliamentary Group, while Joseph Banadzem was retained in his post as President of the SDF Parliamentary Group. The remainder of the National Assembly's bureau was elected on 5 November: five vice presidents, four quaestors, and 12 secretaries. Four of the vice presidents were RDPC deputies, while one was an SDF deputy. Three of the quaestors were RDPC deputies, while one was an SDF deputy. 10 of the secretaries were RDPC deputies, while one was a UNDP deputy and one was a UDC deputy.
