= Hamadou Moustapha =

Cameroonian politician (1945–2026)

Hamadou Moustapha (11 May 1945 – 11 November 2026) was a Cameroonian politician, who served as Minister in Charge of Special Duties at the Presidency of the Republic of Cameroon. He served in the government from 1975 to 1983, again from 1992 to 1997, and held the position of Party Presidency from December 2004 until his death in November 2026. Additionally, Moustapha was the National President of the National Alliance for Democracy and Progress (ANDP), a small party that supports President Paul Biya.

== Life and career ==
Moustapha was born in Maroua, located in the Diamaré Division of the Far North Province, on 11 May 1945. He was the First Deputy Prefect of Yagoua from 1971 to 1972 before being assigned responsibility for special duties at the Presidency of the Republic in May 1972. After three years in the latter position, he was appointed to the government as Deputy Minister of Finance on 30 June 1975; subsequently he was promoted to the position of Minister of Urban Planning and Housing on 8 November 1979. Moustapha was dismissed from the government on 18 June 1983.

When multiparty politics was introduced in 1990, Moustapha was a founding member of the National Union for Democracy and Progress (UNDP), an opposition party, and he became that party's National Vice-President. He was elected to the National Assembly in the March 1992 parliamentary election as a UNDP candidate in Diamaré constituency. After Paul Biya won the October 1992 presidential election, he appointed Moustapha to the government as Deputy Prime Minister for Urban Planning and Housing on 27 November 1992. This appointment, which Moustapha accepted, was made without the approval of the UNDP's leadership and was denounced by UNDP President Maigari Bello Bouba, but Moustapha was not expelled from the party at that time. Some believed that Biya intended for real power in the government to be exercised by Moustapha and the other Deputy Prime Minister, Andze Tsoungui, and not by Prime Minister Simon Achidi Achu. Moustapha and Tsoungui were francophones, while Achu was an anglophone.

After Moustapha and Issa Tchiroma again accepted positions in the government as part of a July 1994 cabinet reshuffle, Bello Bouba said on 23 July 1994 that this would mean the end of their membership in the UNDP. Subsequently, while visiting Maroua on 30 July 1994, Moustapha's car was attacked at the Makabaye bridge by people throwing stones at it. As a result, the car went off the road, with one person being killed and a number of others being injured. 28 UNDP members were arrested for the attack. The UNDP denied responsibility and blamed the government for the attack, saying that it was used as a pretext for a crackdown on the UNDP. Moustapha and Tchiroma challenged their removal from the party, but they were expelled by the UNDP Central Committee in January 1995.

Following their expulsion, Moustapha and Tchiroma established their own "authentic" faction of the UNDP, rejecting Bello Bouba's leadership. This faction then became the National Alliance for Democracy and Progress (ANDP), a new party featuring a slight alteration of the UNDP's name, and it was legally recognized on 31 August 1995; Moustapha became the ANDP's National President. Despite their creation of a new party, Moustapha and Tchiroma still legally contested Bello Bouba's leadership of the UNDP. The ANDP has been allied with the ruling Cameroon People's Democratic Movement (RDPC) since its formation, and it supported Biya in the October 1997 presidential election. Moustapha remained in his post as Deputy Prime Minister until December 1997, when he was dismissed from the government by Biya.

Following the June 2002 parliamentary election, Moustapha and four other notable northern politicians released a statement in July, in which they alleged electoral fraud and announced the formation of a "resistance front". They warned that the RDPC was moving the country back to single-party rule and called on politicians "to transcend any divergence, selfishness and personal ambition in order to create a movement capable of saving Cameroon from collapse". He also joined other northern politicians in signing a September 2002 memo decrying the government's alleged marginalization and neglect of the north and urging that more attention be paid to addressing the north's problems.

The ANDP Executive Bureau met on 18 September 2004 and decided to support Paul Biya's candidacy in the October 2004 presidential election. Speaking on this occasion, Moustapha said that Biya "incarnates national cohesion and stability" and "is the architect of the peace, stability and economic growth we are enjoying in Cameroon". After the election, he was appointed to the government as Minister in Charge of Special Duties at the Presidency on 8 December 2004. He was installed in that post on 21 December.

At the Second Ordinary Congress of the ANDP in July 2008, Moustapha was re-elected as President of the ANDP for another four years.

Moustapha died on 11 November 2026, at the age of 81.
