= 2013 Cameroonian Senate election =

- 14 April 2013

70 of the 100 seats in the Senate 36 seats needed for a majority
- Registered: 9,889
- Turnout: 98.95%
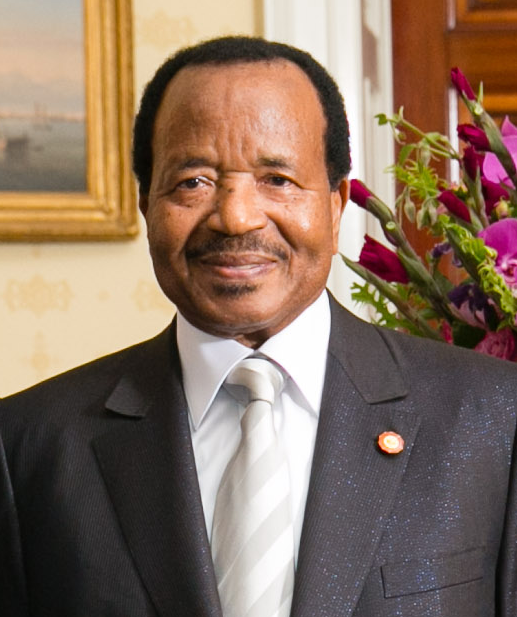

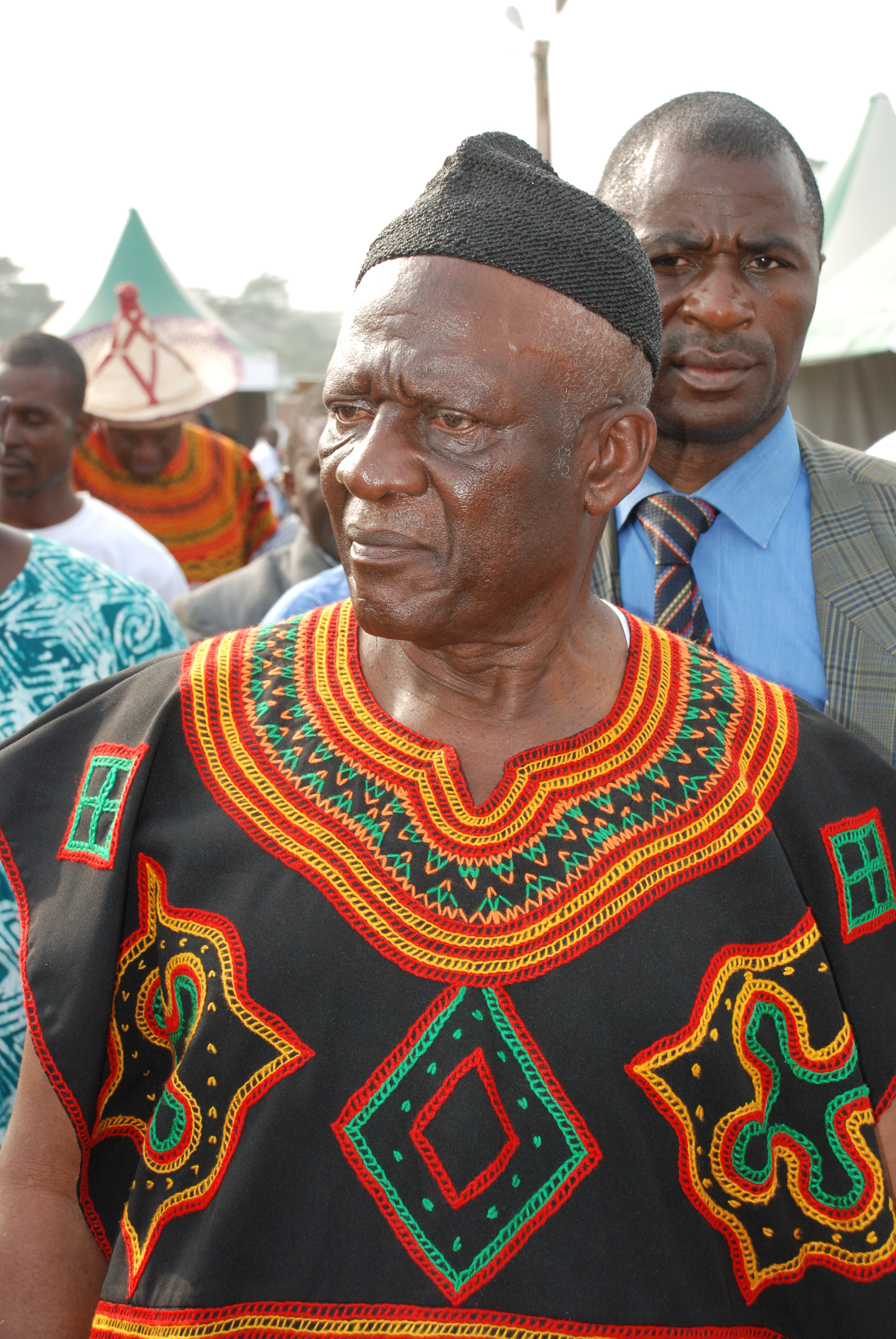
	First party	Second party
Leader	Paul Biya	John Fru Ndi
Party	RDPC	SDF
Seats won	56	14
Popular vote	7,018	1,684
Percentage	73.72%	17.69%
President of the Senate before election
Office established
Elected President of the Senate
Marcel Niat Njifenji
RDPC

The first senatorial elections in Cameroon were held on 14 April 2013. The ruling Cameroon People's Democratic Movement won a large majority of the seats.

== Background ==
The existence of a Cameroon Senate was provided for by the 1996 constitution. However, no elections were organized before 2013, despite several announcements in previous years. Furthermore, critics noted that the existing municipal councilors were serving on extended mandates or "bonus time," since their terms had expired the previous year, leaving the electoral college unrepresentative of the 2013 electorate.

The announcement of the election date, 14 April, caused an outcry within the opposition. This date meant the senatorial elections would take place before the 2013 Cameroonian municipal elections, which guaranteed a landslide victory for the CPDM, as they held the majority in the outgoing municipal councils.

== Electoral system ==
The Senate is the upper house of Cameroon's bicameral parliament. It consists of 100 senators who are completely renewed every five years. Each of the 10 regions of Cameroon is represented by ten senators, seven of whom are elected by an indirect electoral college. While the constitution provides for regional councils to participate, the pioneer 2013 election relied solely on an electoral college composed of the country's 360 municipal councils because regional bodies had not yet been established. The remaining three senators from each region are appointed by decree of the President, totaling thirty appointed senators.

In each region, the seats for the seven elected senators are filled using a mixed-member electoral system with a majority lean: it combines a party-list proportional representation system with a majority jackpot awarded to the leading list. Voters cast their ballots for a closed list of candidates, with no panachage or preferential voting allowed. The list that wins an absolute majority of the votes cast receives all seven seats available in the region. If no list reaches this majority, the list in first place receives a majority bonus of four seats, and the remaining three seats are distributed proportionally using the largest remainder method among all lists that pass the regional electoral threshold of 5% of the votes cast, including the leading list. In the event of a tie between the two leading lists, the bonus is split equally, with two seats awarded to each.

The vote by the electors takes place in the chief towns of the departments by secret ballot. Voting is compulsory, and failure to do so without a valid legal justification results in forfeiture of the mandate as a municipal councilor. In return, the state covers travel expenses and permits proxy voting through another member of the electoral college, with a strict limit of one proxy per member. Candidates for the post of Senator must be at least forty years old on the date of the election, be Cameroonian citizens by birth, demonstrate effective residence within the region where they are running, and be nominated by a legally recognized political party.

Since regional councilors had not yet been elected in 2013, the electoral college was composed exclusively of the 9,889 registered municipal councilors.

== Results ==
A total of 9,785 municipal councilors took part in the voting, representing a turnout rate of 98.95%. The African Union praised the smooth running of the election. However, the opposition accused the CPDM of bribing SDF elected officials in the North West Region. The CDU and NUDP filed official petitions for annulment on 17 April.

The election results were announced on 29 April 2013 by the Supreme Court, acting in place of the Constitutional Council. Following the proclamation, President Paul Biya issued Decree No. 2013/149 on 8 May 2013 to complete the house composition by appointing the remaining 30 senators, consisting of 26 members from the CPDM and 4 members from the opposition, including one member each from the MDR, ANDP, FSNC, and NUDP. One of these appointed members, Marcel Niat Njifenji of the CPDM, was elected as the pioneer President of the Senate on 12 June 2013.

Party	Votes	%	Seats
Cameroon People's Democratic Movement	7,018	73.72	56
Social Democratic Front	1,684	17.69	14
National Union for Democracy and Progress	583	6.12	0
Cameroon Democratic Union	235	2.47	0
Appointed Senators			30
Total	9,520	100.00	100
Valid votes	9,520	97.29	
Invalid/blank votes	265	2.71	
Total votes	9,785	100.00	
Registered voters/turnout	9,889	98.95	
Source: ELECAM

=== By region ===
Region	Elected Senators	Party	Appointed Senators	Party
Adamawa	Siroma Aboubakar; Aboulahi Maikano; Paul Haman; Paul Maande; Joël Nguimbe; Madeleine Haoua; Tidjani Ahmadou	SDF	Baba Hamadou; Moussa Sabo; Mohama Gabdo	CPDM
Centre	Sylvestre Naah Ondoua; Jean-Marie Mama; Elie Essomba Tsoungui; Pascal Andong Adibime; Luc René Bell; Nicole Okala Bilaï; Emmanuel Nemde	CPDM	Laurent Nkodo; Pius Ondoua; Jean-Marie Pongmoni	CPDM
East	Charles Salé; Isabelle Tokpanou; Monique Ouli Ndongo; Badel Ndanga Ndinga; Benjamin Amama Amama; Marie Claire Moampea; Jean Mboundjo	CPDM	Joseph Mata; René ze Nguele; Marlyse Aboui	CPDM
Far North	Boukar Abba; Mahamat Abdoulkarim; Hamadou Alioum Aladji; Marava Abdoulaye Wouyack; Mrs. Zakiatou; Julienne Djakaou; Martin Amrakaye	CPDM	Manouf Mahamat Bhar; Jean-Baptiste Baskouda; Daissala Dakole	CPDM
Littoral	Geneviève Tjoues; Thomas Tobbo Eyoum; Marie Armande Din Bell; Roger Victor Mbassa Ndine; Simon Kingue; Jean-Jules Ebongue Ngo; Claude Kemayou	CPDM	Songue Madiba; David Etame Massoma; Pierre Flambeau Ngayap	CPDM
North	Youssoufa Daoua; Pierre Namio; Amadou Ali; Yvonne Asta; Payounni Bebnone; Maurice Amidou; Mrs. Adamou	CPDM	Aboubakary Abdoulaye; Pierrette Hayatou; Abbo Hamadou	CPDM
North West	Simon Achidi Achu; David Wallang; Ignatus Bayin Dinga; Emma Eno Lafon; Wanlo Chiamua John; Zacharie Awanga; Stephen Yeriwa Jikong	CPDM	Fon Doh Ganyonga III; Francis Nkwain; Njei Fon Teche	CPDM
West	Jean Tsomelou; Bernard Tantse Tagne; Paul Tchatchouang; Delphine Metiedje Nguifo Tchetagne; Etienne Sonkin; Raoul Tchomnou; Nono	SDF	Ibrahim Mbombo Njoya; Marcel Niat Njifenji; Victor Ndjomo Kamga	CPDM
South	Delphine Medjo; Calvin Zang Oyono; Samuel Obam Assam; Grégoire Mba Mba; Thérèse Eloumba Medjo; Mrs. Nnanga Ndoume; Mbita Mvaebeme	CPDM	Pierre Henri Ngallé Ngoa; François Xavier Menye Ondo; Paulette Bisseck	CPDM
South West	Tabe Tando Ndiep Nso; Rebecca Amah Ankie Affiong; Lucas Fontem Njifua; Daniel Matute; Agnès Ndode Ntube; Andrew Moffa Otte; Charles Mbella Moki	CPDM	Peter Mafany Musonge; Victor Fon Mukete; Simon Onjwo Chief An Jan	CPDM
