= Garga Haman Adji =

Cameroonian politician

Garga Haman Adji (born 27 January 1944) is a Cameroonian politician. He served in the government of Cameroon as Minister of the Civil Service from 1990 to 1992 and is currently the President of the Alliance for Democracy and Development (ADD), a minor political party. He is also a municipal councillor in the First Arrondissement of Maroua.

== Early life and education ==
A Muslim and a member of the Fula ethnic group, Garga was born in Maroua. He began working in the state administration when he was a teenager, becoming an auxiliary administrative assistant in Yagoua Prefecture on 26 November 1961 and then head of the secretariat of the sub-prefect of Kar-Haye in July 1962; the latter post enabled him to gain experience in preparing a budget. He also joined the ruling party in 1962, and he studied at Cameroon's National School of Administration and Magistracy, at the International Institute of Administration in Paris, and at the Federal University of Yaounde during the 1960s.

== Professional career and government service ==
Early in his career, Garga held a succession of high-level administrative posts in Cameroon, working as Sub-Director of National Security, Deputy Director of the Ministry of Finance, Secretary-General of the Ministry of the Civil Service, and Finance Director of the National Electricity Company of Cameroon. He then served as State Inspector and Deputy Director of Inspection and Administrative Reform.

Following the April 1984 coup attempt, in which northerners were implicated, Garga was arrested and held at the Kondengui Central Prison. He was soon released, however, and he was appointed as Director-General of Boston Bank Cameroon on 24 October 1984. President Paul Biya appointed Garga to the government as Minister of the Civil Service and the Supreme State Audit in 1990. Reflecting later on his appointment, Garga said that he was pleased by it because he thought Biya had recognized his determination to fight corruption and would allow him to do so freely. After the legalization of multiparty politics in December 1990, Garga helped to found a political party, the Alliance for Democracy and Progress; it was legally recognized on 4 June 1991.

In the government, Garga worked to fight corruption. As head of the Supreme State Audit, he reported that various senior officials owed a total of 357 million CFA francs in missing funds, identifying 42 of them who were alleged to have stolen one million CFA francs or more. Garga argued that the senior officials should be put on trial to demonstrate that corruption would not be tolerated, but no action was taken against them. Garga's ministerial portfolio was then modified on 9 April 1992, when he was appointed as Minister of the Civil Service and Administrative Reform; he thus lost his authority over the Supreme State Audit. According to Garga, Biya did not explain to Garga why he had altered Garga's responsibilities, but Garga believed it was done because Biya and those around him disapproved of Garga's hardline stance against corruption. Frustrated by the situation and feeling that Biya lacked confidence in him, Garga resigned from the government on 27 August 1992. He denied that he was persuaded to resign by opposition leader John Fru Ndi, although he campaigned in support of Fru Ndi's candidacy in the October 1992 presidential election. At the time of the election, Biya said that Garga had resigned because Biya was unwilling to do what Garga wanted. Biya won the 1992 election according to official results; however, Garga claimed that the election was rigged and that Fru Ndi was the actual winner.

== Political career after 1992 ==
Garga's party, which was renamed as the Alliance for Democracy and Development (ADD), performed poorly in elections, but Garga said that was due to electoral fraud. In May 1996, he was planned to appear as a guest on Les Heures fugaces, a debate program on public radio, for a discussion about the death of Ahmadou Ahidjo, but the program was banned immediately prior to its broadcast. According to the radio station's management, the program was not aired due to incomplete paperwork.

As the representative of a political party, Garga was included on the 22-member National Vote Counting Commission at the time of the October 1997 presidential election, and he accused the Commission of acting fraudulently in its handling of the results.

Following the June 2002 parliamentary election, Garga and four other notable northern politicians released a statement in July, in which they alleged electoral fraud and announced the formation of a "resistance front". They warned that the governing Cameroon People's Democratic Movement (RDPC) was moving the country back to single-party rule and called on politicians "to transcend any divergence, selfishness and personal ambition in order to create a movement capable of saving Cameroon from collapse". Garga also joined other northern politicians in signing a September 2002 memo decrying the government's alleged marginalization and neglect of the north and urging that more attention be paid to addressing the north's problems.

Garga stood as the ADD candidate in the October 2004 presidential election. Refusing to join the opposition coalition at that time, he said that aside from Fru Ndi and Adamou Ndam Njoya the coalition was composed of unreliable opportunists, while his critics argued that wanted to run for President only to satisfy his own ego. Along with other opposition leaders, Garga called for the computerization of the electoral process, saying that it was necessary to "preserve the social peace and guarantee a transparent election". In the election, he placed fourth with 3.73% of the vote. Biya won the election overwhelmingly, although Garga managed a "respectable" performance in the area of Diamaré, located in Far North Province.

In a statement released on 15 October 2004, a few days after the election, Garga condemned the election as fraudulent, pointing to a wide range of flaws and asserting the need for an independent electoral commission to oversee future elections. He also criticized other opposition leaders for behaving in what he described as a fractious, selfish, and inconsistent manner since the early 1990s. In other post-election observations, he disapprovingly noted that people tended to vote for candidates native to their own region and stressed the importance of unity, saying that the people should move beyond tribal politics and vote on the basis of ideas. Regarding discontent and secessionist tendencies in the Anglophone population, he said that their grievances had merit and that the government should take those grievances seriously.

=== Anti-Corruption Commission and 2007 election ===
When Biya launched an anti-corruption campaign in early 2006, Garga expressed cautious approval, saying that Biya was finally doing what he had recommended in the early 1990s and that it was "better late than never", but he also said that the anti-corruption campaign needed to extend much further. According to Garga, many ministers and heads of state corporations were corrupt.

Aside from his role as President of the ADD, Garga also headed the "Good Conscience" non-governmental organization as of 2006. Following the creation of the Mo Ibrahim Prize, which was intended to promote good governance by rewarding retired African leaders with large sums of money, Garga expressed skepticism in an October 2006 interview with BBC Africa. He argued that an unwillingness to engage in corruption was based on one's "personal conviction, which has nothing to do with wealth". He was also skeptical that the prize would encourage African leaders to retire, arguing that no amount of money would be sufficient if they did not want to leave power.

On 15 March 2007, President Biya appointed Garga to a three-year term on the Coordination Committee of the National Anti-Corruption Commission. At the swearing-in ceremony on 30 May 2007, Garga collapsed, but he received quick medical attention and recovered within minutes. In the press, his collapse was blamed on the very crowded atmosphere in the hall, as well as the fact that he had been standing for about an hour.

Garga was one of three ADD candidates elected to the 35-member Municipal Council of the First Arrondissement of Maroua in the July 2007 municipal election. Although his party won only a few municipal seats and no parliamentary seats, Garga observed that the ADD had never before won any municipal seats and argued that the ADD had made progress because it existed "in an environment of thieves" but still managed to "save some of [its] possessions". At the first session of the First Arrondissement's Municipal Council, Garga was designated as Vice-President of its Finance Committee. Although a secondary position in local government was minor compared to positions he had held earlier in his career, Garga said that he wanted to be useful and was happy to share his experience with other members of the council. In reaction to the National Elections Observatory's generally positive report on the 2007 parliamentary and municipal election, published on 31 July 2008, Garga said that the election was rigged and that the Observatory's report did not reflect reality. According to Garga, voter registration was selective and represented such a small portion of the population (4.6 million registered voters out of 18.5 million citizens) that the election had no credibility. He also pointed to allegations of multiple voting and vote-buying in claiming that the election was not free and fair.

== Personal life ==
Garga, as a Muslim, has several wives.
