= Bello Bouba Maigari =

Cameroonian politician (born 1947)

President of the National Union for Democracy and Progress
- Incumbent
- Assumed office 5 January 1992
- Preceded by: Samuel Eboua

6th Prime Minister of Cameroon
- In office 6 November 1982 – 22 August 1983
- President: Paul Biya
- Preceded by: Paul Biya
- Succeeded by: Luc Ayang

Minister of State Minister of Tourism and Leisure
- In office 9 December 2011 – 1 July 2025
- Prime Minister: Philémon Yang; Joseph Ngute
- Preceded by: Baba Hamadou (Tourism); Nanfang Ousmane (Leisure)

Minister of Transport
- In office 22 January 1984 – 22 October 1988
- Prime Minister: Luc Ayang
- Preceded by: Moukoko Mbonjo
- Succeeded by: Edgard Alain Mebe Ngo

Member of the National Assembly
- Incumbent
- Assumed office 31 March 1992

Personal details
- Born: 1947 (age 78–79) Bashéo, French Cameroon
- Party: UNDP (since 1991)
- Other political affiliations: CPDM (1985–1991); CNU (1966–1985); UPC (1960–1966)
- Education: University of Yaoundé; University of Paris

Bello Bouba Maigari (born 1947) is a Cameroonian politician who has been the President of the National Union for Democracy and Progress (UNDP) since 1992. He previously served as Minister of Tourism and Leisure in the government of Joseph Ngute from 2011 to 2025, the Minister of Transport from 1984 to 1988, and the sixth prime minister under President Paul Biya from 1982 to 1983.

Born in Bashéo, Maigari was educated in Yaoundé and France. He joined politics in the early 1960s joining the Union of the Peoples of Cameroon (UDC). In 1966, after President Ahmadou Ahidjo declared Cameroon a one-party state, Maigari joined the Cameroonian National Union (CNU) where he joined the government and served in both administrative and ministerial offices. After Ahidjo resigned as president in 1982, Maigari was appointed prime minister by the new President Paul Biya. Aged 35 when being appointed to the role, Maigari was the youngest holder of the office. He served in this role until 1983 where he was replaced by Luc Ayang.

In January 1984, Maigari was appointed Minister of Transport, serving in the role until October 1988. In the late 1980s, Maigari became a strong advocate for democratic reforms, good governance, and electoral transparency in Cameroon. In 1991, he left the CPDM and joined the newly formed National Union for Democracy and Progress (UNDP) where he eventually became its president in January 1992. He subsequently became an opposition leader to President Biya, with his party winning 68 seats in the 1992 parliamentary election, the first multi-party elections, with Maigari himself winning a seat. He also ran in the 1992 presidential election but then lost to Biya.

However, in the early 2000s, he became more aligned with President Biya again and was appointed the Minister of Tourism and Leisure in December 2011. He served in this role for nearly 14 years where in June 2025, he started to cut tied with President Biya again. He officially resigned from the role the following month and officially declared his bid for the 2025 presidential election.

== Biography ==
Bello Bouba was born in Baschéo, in Benoué Department in the North Province of Cameroon. From 1972 to 1975, Bello Bouba was Secretary-General of the Ministry of the Armed Forces. He was appointed Deputy Secretary-General of the Presidency on June 30, 1975, serving in that position until January 1982 (with the rank of Minister from November 11, 1980). In the government named on January 7, 1982, he became Minister of State for the Economy and the Plan; later, when President Ahmadou Ahidjo resigned in November 1982, Bello Bouba was named Prime Minister under the new President, Paul Biya. Biya was said to have appointed Bello Bouba at the behest of Ahidjo; many thought that Ahidjo intended for Bello Bouba — a Muslim from the north, like himself, and unlike Biya — to be his ultimate successor and that Biya was intended to serve as essentially a caretaker president in the meantime. Ahidjo and Biya soon came into conflict with one another, however. Ahidjo went into exile, and on August 22, 1983, Biya publicly accused Ahidjo of plotting a coup; on the same occasion, he announced his dismissal of Bello Bouba as Prime Minister, replacing him with Luc Ayang.

Ahidjo was tried in absentia for the 1983 coup plot and was sentenced to death by a tribunal on February 28, 1984; on that occasion, the tribunal proposed that others, including Bello Bouba, should also be placed on trial. However, Biya halted the legal proceedings against them. Bello Bouba went into exile in Nigeria following the failed April 1984 coup attempt against Biya.

Bello Bouba announced the formation of a new party, the National Union for Democracy and Progress in Cameroon (UNDPC), in Paris on May 25, 1990. After the party was legalized (as the UNDP) in March 1991, he returned to Cameroon on August 17, 1991. At the UNDP congress held in Garoua on January 4–5, 1992, Bello Bouba became President of the UNDP, ousting the party's previous leader, Samuel Eboua. He was elected to the National Assembly in the March 1992 parliamentary election as a Deputy from Benoué.

Although a five-year residency requirement initially prevented Bello Bouba from running for President later in 1992, this was changed to one year; the change has been attributed to the desire of the French government to have Bello Bouba participate in the election. Bello Bouba placed third in the election, held on October 11, 1992, behind Biya and Social Democratic Front (SDF) candidate John Fru Ndi, receiving 19.22% of the vote. In two provinces, Adamawa Province and North Province, he won majorities: 64.04% in Adamawa Province and 50.42% in North Province. He and Fru Ndi disputed the official results which proclaimed Biya the winner and they unsuccessfully sought to have the election annulled by the Supreme Court due to alleged fraud. Biya appointed two UNDP leaders, Hamadou Moustapha and Issa Tchiroma, to the government in November 1992, apparently in an attempt to divide and weaken the UNDP. Bello Bouba strongly opposed the appointments, but despite their indiscipline the two were not immediately expelled from the party.

After Moustapha and Tchiroma again accepted positions in the government as part of a July 1994 cabinet reshuffle, Bello Bouba said on July 23, 1994 that this would mean the end of their membership in the UNDP. Subsequently, while visiting Maroua on July 30, 1994, Moustapha's car was attacked by people throwing stones at it. As a result, the car went off the road, with one person being killed and a number of others being injured. 28 UNDP members were arrested for the attack. The UNDP denied responsibility and blamed the government for the attack, saying that it was used as a pretext for a crackdown on the UNDP. Bello Bouba and the other UNDP deputies initiated a boycott of the National Assembly on November 8, 1994, in order to press for the release of the arrested UNDP militants; they ended their boycott a few weeks later, however.

Moustapha and Tchiroma challenged their removal from the party, but they were ultimately expelled by the UNDP Central Committee in January 1995. Following their expulsion, Moustapha and Tchiroma established their own "authentic" faction of the UNDP, rejecting Bello Bouba's leadership. This faction then became the National Alliance for Democracy and Progress (ANDP), a new party featuring a slight alteration of the UNDP's name. Despite their creation of a new party, Moustapha and Tchiroma still legally contested Bello Bouba's leadership of the UNDP.

Although Bello Bouba was re-elected to the National Assembly in the May 1997 parliamentary election, the UNDP performed poorly, losing many of its seats. The UNDP then participated in the opposition boycott of the October 1997 presidential election; according to Bello Bouba, "there is absolutely no political will on the part of the ruling party to move towards peaceful development ... there is no universal suffrage in a country in which half of the voters are prevented from exercising their right to vote." Following the election, in which Biya faced no serious competition, Bello Bouba accepted an appointment to the government as Minister of State for Industrial and Commercial Development in December 1997. In taking the post, despite his strong opposition to Biya beforehand, he said that Biya wanted to include opposition leaders in the government, although he acknowledged that it appeared that Biya was doing so in hopes of isolating Fru Ndi.

In the 2002 parliamentary election, Bello Bouba was again a UNDP candidate in Benoué West constituency, but this time he was defeated. The UNDP won only one seat in that election, and Bello Bouba described it as a "farce", alleging that low voter registration was used to rig the election in favor of the ruling Cameroon People's Democratic Movement (RDPC); some party members, however, reportedly attributed the UNDP's poor performance to disapproval of Bello Bouba's cooperation with the RDPC in the government. Some party members wanted him to leave the government after the 2002 election and for the UNDP to join the broader opposition, but he chose to remain, despite dissent within the party. He supported Biya, the incumbent president, in the October 2004 presidential election; he said that, although parties are created to win power, it is not necessary for them to participate in every election, and that the UNDP supported Biya for the sake of continued peace and economic growth. In the government named on December 8, 2004, he was moved from his position as Minister of State for Industrial and Commercial Development to that of Minister of State for Post and Telecommunications.

Bello Bouba was re-elected as UNDP President at a party congress in Bertoua on January 20–21, 2007. Speaking on February 14, 2009, Bello Bouba defended his party's participation in the government, saying that its participation gave it the opportunity to directly work for the benefit of the country in a way that would not be possible if it merely criticized the government from the outside.

In mid-May 2009, it was announced that Bello Bouba would stand as the UNDP candidate in the 2011 presidential election. Bello Bouba's ministerial portfolio was altered on June 30, 2009, when he was appointed Minister of State for Transport. As a presidential candidate, Bello Bouba—who had a limited base of support that was largely confined to the north—was considered to have no serious chance of winning the 2011 election. It was thought that he would continue supporting President Biya, who was expected to stand for another term, and wanted to remain in the government.

Bello Bouba ultimately did not stand as a presidential candidate when the vote was held in October 2011. Biya again won re-election easily. In the government named on 9 December 2011, Bello Bouba was moved to the post of Minister of State for Tourism and Leisure. He was installed in his new ministry on 10 December.

Political offices
Preceded by Paul Biya	Prime Minister of Cameroon; 1982–1983	Succeeded by Luc Ayang
