= 2018 Cameroonian presidential election =

Sixth re-election of Paul Biya

- 7 October 2018
- Registered: 6,667,754
- Turnout: 53.85% (▼14.43pp)
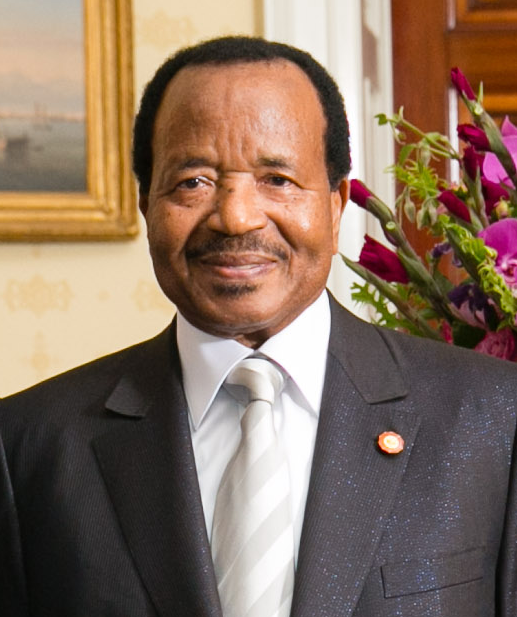

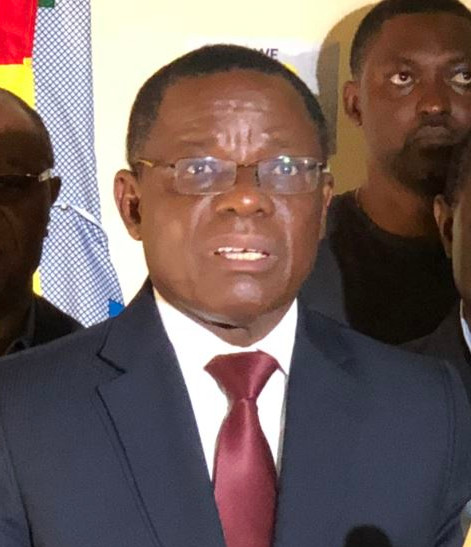

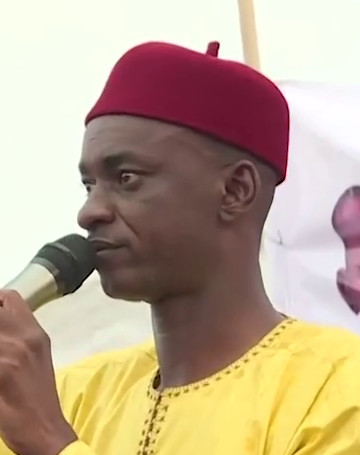
Nominee	Paul Biya	Maurice Kamto	Cabral Libii
Party	RDPC	MRC	Univers
Popular vote	2,521,934	503,384	221,995
Percentage	71.28%	14.23%	6.28%
- Results by department Biya: 40-50% 50–60% 60–70% 70–80% 80–90% >90% Kamto: 40-50% 50-60% Libii: 60-70%
President before election
Paul Biya
RDPC
Elected President
Paul Biya
RDPC

Presidential elections were held in Cameroon on 7 October 2018.

== Background ==
The previous presidential elections on 9 October 2011 saw incumbent president Paul Biya, in power since 1982, elected for another seven-year term following a 2008 constitutional amendment that removed term limits, allowing Biya to run again. Going into the 2018 elections, Cameroon experienced unrest in the English-speaking portions of the country where separatists have attempted to create the state of Ambazonia. The worst of the unrest occurred in Manyu where several Western countries issued travel warnings to their citizens. The Social Democratic Front, a party that traditionally performs well in the English-speaking portions of the country, has been vocal in their criticism of the handling of the unrest. Biya has responded to the unrest by stating that he would like to see faster progress made on decentralization reforms that were begun in 2010 so that local regions would have more self governance.

On 15 June 2018, the BBC obtained a copy of a letter from Paul Biya to the leader of Cameroon's Senate, appearing to request that the elections be postponed until October 2019. In July, President Biya announced that the election would be held on October 7, 2018.

== Electoral system ==
The President of Cameroon is elected by first-past-the-post voting; the candidate with the most votes is declared the winner with no requirement to achieve a majority.

== Candidates ==
=== Accepted ===
- Garga Haman Adji, leader of the Alliance for Democracy and Development
- Paul Biya, incumbent president and candidate for the Cameroon People's Democratic Movement
- Maurice Kamto, candidate for the Cameroon Renaissance Movement
- Cabral Libii, journalist and law professor at University of Yaoundé II; candidate for Univers
- Serge Espoir Matomba, Douala city councilman and leader of United People for Social Renovation
- Akere Muna, candidate for Now!
- Ndifor Afanwi Franklin, candidate for the National Citizens' Movement of Cameroon
- Adamou Ndam Njoya, candidate for the Cameroon Democratic Union
- Joshua Osih, selected as the Social Democratic Front candidate on 24 February 2018

=== Did not run ===
- Samuel Eto'o; the former footballer was rumoured to be considering running.
- Dieudonné M'bala M'bala, French comedian of Cameroonian descent
- Bernard Muna
- Bernard Njonga; leader of Believe in Cameroon

== Results ==
Candidate	Party	Votes	%
Paul Biya	Cameroon People's Democratic Movement	2,521,934	71.28
Maurice Kamto	Cameroon Renaissance Movement	503,384	14.23
Cabral Libii	Univers	222,020	6.28
Joshua Osih	Social Democratic Front	118,706	3.36
Adamou Ndam Njoya	Cameroon Democratic Union	61,220	1.73
Garga Haman Adji	Alliance for Democracy and Development	55,048	1.56
Ndifor Afanwi Franklin	Cameroonian National Citizen Movement	23,687	0.67
Serge Espoir Matomba	United People for Social Renovation	19,704	0.56
Akere Muna	Now!	12,262	0.35
Total		3,537,965	100.00
Valid votes		3,537,965	98.53
Invalid/blank votes		52,716	1.47
Total votes		3,590,681	100.00
Registered voters/turnout		6,667,754	53.85
Source: Camerlex

== Aftermath ==
On 28 January 2019 Maurice Kamto was arrested in Douala while at a supporter's house.
