= Jean-Jacques Ekindi =

Cameroonian politician

President of the Progressive Movement
- In office 23 August 1991 – 30 April 2020
- Preceded by: Party established
- Succeeded by: Hilaire Nzipan (acting)

Member of the National Assembly for Wouri Centre
- In office 2007–2013

Personal details
- Born: 1945 (age 80–81) Foumban, French Cameroon
- Party: CPDM (1985–1991; 2020–present)
- Other political affiliations: MP (1991–2020)

Jean-Jacques Ekindi (born January 1945) is a Cameroonian politician and activist who served as National President of the Progressive Movement from 1991 until his resignation in 2020. He was a member of the National Assembly for Wouri Centre from 2007 to 2013.

== As a student activist and a CPDM leader ==
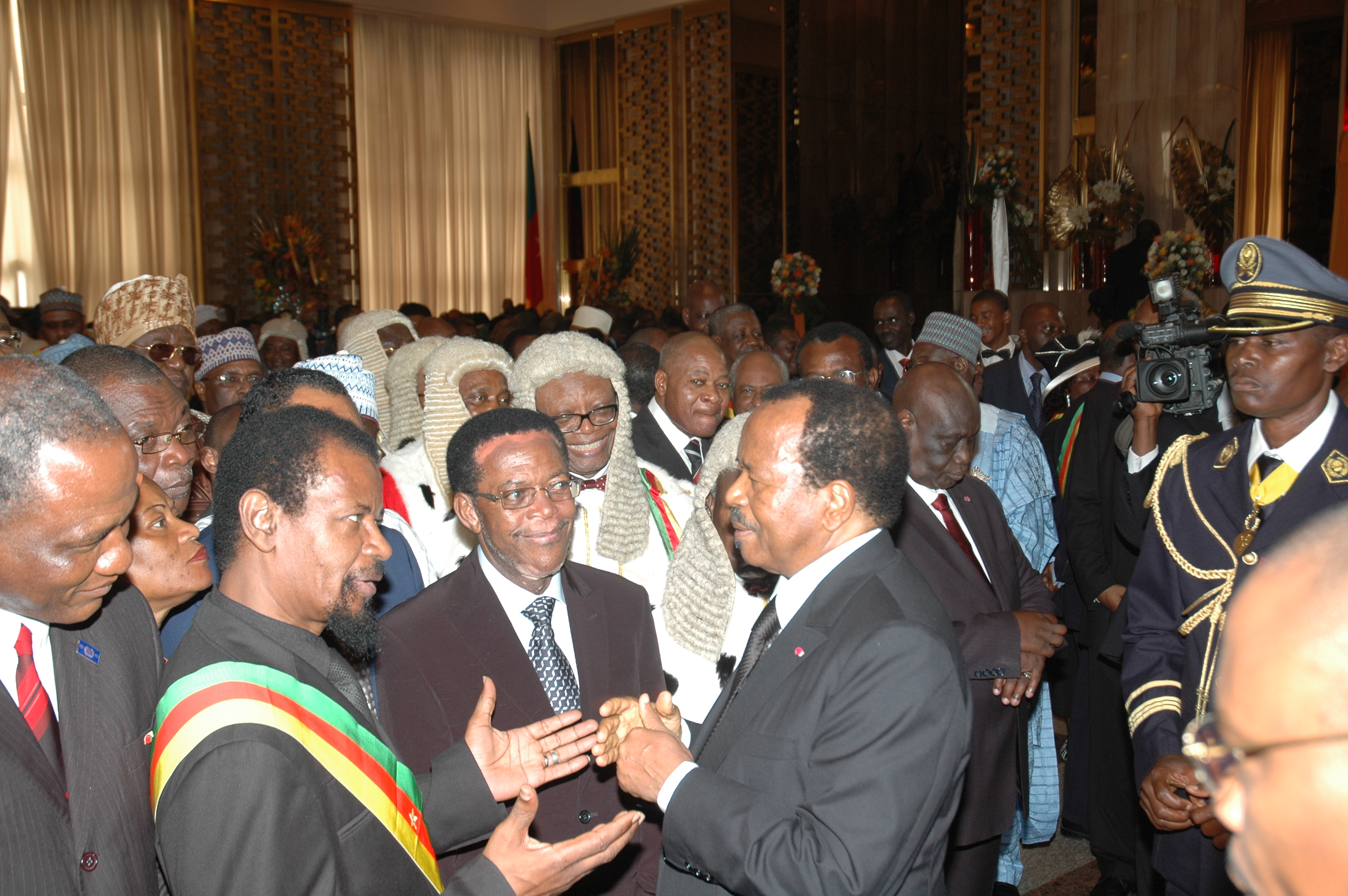
Jean-Jacques Ekindi (Wearing a Sash) with Paul Biya and Jean Nkuete

Ekindi was born in Douala. Early in his political career, he was a member of the Union of the Peoples of Cameroon (UPC). He was politically active while studying in France, and he was arrested for political reasons in 1970 when he returned to Cameroon for a visit. After nearly two years in prison, he was released and resumed his studies in France. When the Cameroon People's Democratic Movement (CPDM) was created as the governing party in 1985, replacing the Cameroon National Union (CNU), Ekindi joined the party, encouraged by President Paul Biya's promises of reform.

Ekindi was elected as the President of the Wouri Section of the CPDM in 1986. His election was considered part of an effort by President Biya to reconcile factions in the party by allowing politicians such as Ekindi, who had been considered disloyal in the past, to take prominent leadership roles as Section Presidents. In 1990, at the beginning of the period of multiparty political reform, he was considered to be among the leading progressive figures within the CPDM. In early 1991, Ekindi was re-elected as President of the Wouri Section, defeating Albert Dzongang. However, he left the CPDM in May 1991. Ekindi was considered the most important CPDM member to defect to the opposition at that time.

== As an opposition leader in the early 1990s ==
In opposition, Ekindi founded a new party, the MP; he has been the MP's National President since it was founded on 23 August 1991. He participated in a rally held by the National Coordination of Opposition Parties and Associations (NCOPA) in Douala on 23–24 September 1991, and on that occasion he was arrested and treated so badly that he required hospitalization. 30 to 60 people were arrested when they protested in Douala against Ekindi's arrest. Ekindi was in custody for less than 24 hours and was released without charge at the request of foreign consuls.

Ekindi was the MP candidate in the October 1992 presidential election. During the campaign, Cameroon Radio Television (CRTV) refused to air a segment produced by the Ekindi campaign on 2 October, judging that the segment included "'vociferous attacks' against the CPDM and 'insulting and defamatory words against Paul Biya'". The National Communication Board reviewed this decision and decided to allow the segment to be aired on 7 October. Further messages from the Ekindi campaign on 9 October and 10 October were not allowed to be aired, however; according to the government, this was because Ekindi was "not respecting legal provisions". According to the official results of the 1992 election, Ekindi received 0.79% of the vote (a total of 23,525 votes) and placed fifth. His best performance was in the Far North Province, where he won 9,903 votes.

When Biya garnered the nickname "Lion Man" (l'homme lion) at the time of the 1992 presidential election, Ekindi in turn garnered the nickname "Lion Hunter" (chasseur du lion) for his fierce opposition to Biya. Ekindi's stance on the issue of federalism varied at the time. He backed the idea on 4 February 1992 and urged Biya not to ignore the Anglophone problem, arguing that concerns about the possibility of Anglophone secession were baseless because the Anglophone parties were not seeking secession. However, he said in April 1992 that a unitary state was preferable because it would be less expensive than federalism.

== Political activities since 2003 ==
In late 2003, Ekindi became the Chairman-in-Office of the Front of Alternative Forces, an opposition coalition. Ekindi was briefly detained in Douala along with other members of the Front in January 2004 as they were about to launch a petition related to the forthcoming presidential election; among other things, the petition called for the electoral register to be computerized and for electoral lists to be revised. He was again detained on 17 August 2004 at a march in Douala. In a September 2004 interview, Ekindi expressed his disapproval of the large number of political parties in Cameroon, arguing that it was not useful to have so many and that it made the political landscape crowded and chaotic. He said that many parties were created by individuals seeking only personal gain and that the government used agents to create new parties in order to disrupt the existing opposition. According to Ekindi, Cameroon would ideally have only three parties, one of them in power and the other two in opposition, and he proposed merger agreements to make that happen.

Again running as the MP's presidential candidate in the 11 October 2004 presidential election, Ekindi submitted a legal challenge to Biya's candidacy at the Supreme Court in September 2004, arguing that the constitution barred Biya from standing for re-election while also serving as the President of the CPDM. Ekindi then announced his withdrawal from the election on 10 October in favor of John Fru Ndi, the candidate of the main opposition party, the SDF. His name nevertheless remained on the ballot, and he placed 13th out of 16 candidates with 0.27% of the vote; he received his best score in the Far North Province, where he took 0.62% of the vote.

After the 2004 election, Ekindi filed two petitions at the Supreme Court seeking the annulment of the election. The first petition dealt with Ekindi's argument that Biya was not a valid candidate because he was simultaneously President of the Republic and President of the CPDM, while the second focused on allegations of misconduct in the election itself. The Supreme Court rejected both of Ekindi's petitions, along with all ten of the other petitions filed by others seeking the election's annulment, on 22 October.

In an interview with The Post on 2 January 2007, Ekindi said that he planned to stand as a parliamentary and municipal candidate in Douala in the election held later that year. Also in that interview, he sharply criticized Biya's 2007 New Year address, arguing that it was inappropriate for Biya to criticize corruption and other problems when he, as President for the previous 24 years, was the person most responsible for the state of the nation. According to Ekindi, Biya's criticisms of the country's problems actually represented an admission of his own failure. Furthermore, in response to Biya's assertion that 2006 had been a good year, Ekindi said that this indicated that Biya was divorced from the stark reality experienced by the people.

In the 22 July 2007 parliamentary election, Ekindi was elected to the National Assembly as an MP candidate in the Wouri Centre constituency of Littoral Province, where the MP received 22.43% of the vote and one of the three available seats. Ekindi was the only member of his party to win a seat in the 2007 election. During the campaign, he complained that the MP received only six seconds of airtime on television per day, giving it a total of one minute and 24 seconds for the whole campaign. According to Ekindi, this represented discrimination against small parties and was illegal. He also headed the MP list for the concurrent municipal election in Douala 1 and won a seat as a municipal councillor there. At the time of the election, the alliance between the MP and the SDF collapsed because, according to Ekindi, the SDF decided to run candidates in Wouri Centre and ignored the alliance. The MP instead formed an alliance with the Cameroon Democratic Union (CDU).

During the re-election of the Bureau of the National Assembly on 14 March 2008, Ekindi objected when Emilia Lifaka, the Vice-President of the CPDM Parliamentary Group, presented a "consensus" list of candidates for the Bureau. Ekindi said that he had not been consulted about the list and that it was therefore not based on a consensus. Cavaye Yeguie Djibril, the President of the National Assembly, ignored Ekindi's objection.

After three broadcasting stations were temporarily shut down and broadcasting equipment was subsequently withheld from one of them, Ekindi alleged on 4 July 2008 that Minister of Communications Jean Pierre Biyiti bi Essam was "guilty of abuse of power". Ekindi participated in political consultations with Prime Minister Ephraïm Inoni regarding the appointment of the members of Elections Cameroon (ELECAM), the national electoral commission. After Biya appointed the members of ELECAM on 30 December 2008, Ekindi said on 3 January 2009 that the appointments went beyond mere manipulation, which he had come to expect, and reached the level of blatant deception. According to Ekindi, he had not expected Biya to go so far as to appoint leading CPDM members to ELECAM, as the members of ELECAM were supposed to be neutral, independent individuals. Furthermore, he said that the consultations held prior to the appointments were useless because the proposals made during those consultations were completely ignored.

The MP failed to win any seats in the September 2013 parliamentary election, and Ekindi therefore lost his seat in the National Assembly.

In April 2020, Jean-Jacques Ekindi resigned from his party to join the CPDM.

== Personal life ==
Ekindi's wife, Else Ekindi, died suddenly on 26 October 2007.
