= National Union for Democracy and Progress (Cameroon) =

Political party in Cameroon

National Union for Democracy and Progress Union nationale pour la démocratie et le progrès
- Abbreviation: UNDP (French); NUDP (English)
- President: Bello Bouba Maigari
- Founded: 9 February 1991; 35 years ago
- Headquarters: B.P. 5019 Nlongkak, Yaoundé
- Colors: Green
- Senate: 1 / 100
- National Assembly: 7 / 180

Website
- undpfrance.free.fr (in French)

The National Union for Democracy and Progress (French: Union nationale pour la démocratie et le progrès; UNDP or NUDP) is a political party in Cameroon, drawing its main support from the north of the country. It was established as an opposition party in the early 1990s and won the second largest number of seats in the 1992 parliamentary election. The UNDP's National President is Maigari Bello Bouba, who was briefly Prime Minister of Cameroon from 1982-83.

== History ==
On May 25, 1990, former Prime Minister Maigari Bello Bouba, then in exile, announced the formation of a new party, the National Union for Democracy and Progress in Cameroon, in Paris. The party was officially established in Cameroon, as the National Union for Democracy and Progress, at a meeting in Douala on February 9, 1991. A request for the legalization of the party was filed on February 18, and it was accordingly legalized on March 25, 1991. Bello Bouba returned to Cameroon on August 17, 1991. The UNDP's First Ordinary Congress, at which the party's leadership and the membership of its organs was elected, was held on January 4–5, 1992 in Garoua. At the Congress, Bello Bouba became President of the UNDP, ousting its previous leader, Samuel Eboua. Eboua subsequently left the UNDP and formed the Movement for Democracy and Progress (MDP). The UNDP is considered by many, including the party itself, to represent the legacy of Ahmadou Ahidjo, who was President of Cameroon from 1960 to 1982.

Although the UNDP initially agreed to boycott the 1992 parliamentary election, along with the Social Democratic Front and Cameroon Democratic Union, it ultimately decided to participate. In the election, which was held on March 1, 1992, the UNDP put forward complete candidate lists in 45 of the 49 constituencies (for 167 seats) and won a total of 68 out of 180 seats in the National Assembly of Cameroon. The party performed most strongly in the north, where it won all 12 seats in North Province and all ten seats in Adamawa Province; it also fared well in Southwest Province, where it won 13 of the 15 seats, and in West Province, where it won a slight majority of the available seats (13 out of 25). The UNDP's performance made it the second largest party in the National Assembly, behind only the ruling Cameroon People's Democratic Movement (RDPC), which won 88 seats; it also became the only opposition party in the National Assembly when the other two opposition parties, the Movement for the Defense of the Republic (MDR) and the Union of the Peoples of Cameroon (UPC), allied with the RDPC. Two of the UNDP deputies also allied with the RDPC.

In the presidential election held on October 11, 1992, Bello Bouba placed third, behind President Paul Biya and Social Democratic Front (SDF) candidate John Fru Ndi, receiving 19.2% of the vote. He disputed the official results which proclaimed Biya the winner, saying that Fru Ndi had actually won, and he strongly opposed the appointment of two UNDP members, Hamadou Moustapha and Issa Tchiroma, to the government by Biya in November 1992. Despite being denounced by the party for accepting the appointments, Moustapha and Tchiroma were not immediately expelled from it; however, after they again accepted positions in the government in a July 1994 cabinet reshuffle, Bello Bouba said on July 23 that this would mean the end of their membership in the UNDP. They challenged this, but they were expelled by the party's central committee in January 1995.

The UNDP held its Second Ordinary Congress on January 3–5, 1997 in Ngaoundéré. In the parliamentary election held on May 17, 1997, the UNDP won 13 seats. It participated in the opposition boycott, based on the lack of an independent electoral commission, of the October 1997 presidential election, which was easily won by Biya. Nevertheless, Bello Bouba accepted an appointment to the government following Biya's victory.

The UNDP won only one seat in the June 2002 parliamentary election, that of Amadou Mohaman in Mayo-Oula constituency in North Province. Bello Bouba criticized this election as a "farce", alleging that low voter registration was used to rig the election in favor of the RDPC; some party members, however, reportedly attributed the UNDP's poor performance to disapproval of its cooperation with the RDPC in the government. Some party members wanted Bello Bouba to leave the government after the 2002 election and for the UNDP to join the broader opposition, but he chose to remain, despite dissent within the party.

Acting without Bello Bouba's approval, UNDP Vice-President Célestin Bedzigui held discussions with SDF Vice-Chairman Maïdadi Saïdou in 2002 about how to achieve democratic change in Cameroon. Bedzigui also opposed the RDPC-UNDP government platform. Accusing Bedzingui of acting contrary to the party's decisions, Bello Bouba notified Bedzingui of his expulsion from the UNDP on August 4, 2004. Bedzingui in turn declared that Bello Bouba was expelled from the party on August 8.

The UNDP backed Biya in the October 2004 presidential election; Bello Bouba said that, although parties are created to win power, it is not necessary for them to participate in every election, and the UNDP supported Biya for the sake of continued peace and economic growth.

In the July 2007 parliamentary election, the UNDP won four of the initially declared 163 seats, and it won a further two seats (out of 17 at stake) in constituencies where the election was held over again in September, thus winning a total of six out of 180 seats.

Bello Bouba was re-elected as UNDP President at a party congress in Bertoua on January 20–21, 2007. Speaking on February 14, 2009, Bello Bouba defended the UNDP's participation in the government, saying that its participation gave it the opportunity to directly work for the benefit of the country in a way that would not be possible if it merely criticized the government from the outside.

== Election results ==
=== Presidential elections ===
Election	Candidate	Votes	%	Result
1992	Bello Bouba Maigari	569,887	19.22%	Lost ✗
1997	Boycotted			
2004	Supported Paul Biya (RDPC)	2,665,359	70.92%	Elected ✓
2011	Did not contest			
2018	Did not contest			
2025	Bello Bouba Maigari	112,758	2.45%	Lost ✗

=== National Assembly elections ===
Election	Leader	Votes	%	Seats	+/–	Position	Outcome
1992	Bello Bouba Maigari	770,586	35.5%	68 / 180	▲68	▲2nd	Opposition
1997	Bello Bouba Maigari	392,712	13.5%	13 / 180	▼55	▼3rd	Opposition
2002	Bello Bouba Maigari	—	—	1 / 180	▼12	▼5th	Governing majority
2007	Bello Bouba Maigari	355,903	11.4%	6 / 180	▲5	▲3rd	Governing majority
2013	Bello Bouba Maigari	478,503	11.9%	5 / 180	▼1	3rd	Governing majority
2020	Bello Bouba Maigari	—	—	7 / 180	▲2	▲2nd	Governing majority (2020–2025)
2020	Bello Bouba Maigari	—	—	7 / 180	▲2	▲2nd	Opposition (2025–present)
