= 2007 Cameroonian parliamentary election =

- 22 July 2007
- All 180 seats in the National Assembly; 91 seats needed for a majority
- Turnout: 64.03%
Party	Leader	Vote %	Seats	+/–
RDPC	Paul Biya	67.30	153	+4
FSD	John Fru Ndi	13.60	16	−6
UNDP	Bello Bouba Maigari	11.38	6	+5
UDC	Adamou Ndam Njoya	2.19	4	−1
MP	Jean-Jacques Ekindi	0.13	1	+1
This lists parties that won seats. See the complete results below.
Prime Minister before	Prime Minister after
Ephraïm Inoni; RDPC	Ephraïm Inoni; RDPC

Parliamentary elections were held in Cameroon on 22 July 2007, with voting in some districts re-run on 30 September. Local elections were held on the same day, with seats on 363 town councils at stake. The result was a victory for the ruling Cameroon People's Democratic Movement (RDPC), which won 153 of the 180 seats in the National Assembly, whilst the main opposition party, the Social Democratic Front (SDF), won 16 seats.

== Campaign ==
A total of 1,274 candidates stood for the 180 seats in the National Assembly, with 41 parties participating in the elections. In the local elections, 24,820 candidates contested the 6,514 available positions. The RDPC was the only party to have candidates in all districts.

During the campaign, there were claims that the RDPC was given disproportionate airtime on television and radio; Jean-Jacques Ekindi, the President of the opposition Progressive Movement (MP), complained that the MP received only six seconds of airtime on television per day, giving it a total of one minute and 24 seconds for the whole campaign. According to Ekindi, this represented discrimination against small parties and was illegal. On 18 July 2007, the MP formalized an alliance with the Cameroonian Democratic Union (UDC); as part of this agreement, the parties decided not to run candidates in the same constituencies.

== Conduct ==
On 17 July, John Fru Ndi, the leader of the opposition SDF, which suffered from divisions in the years preceding the election, claimed that the preparations for the elections were plagued with irregularities, including poor distribution of voter registration cards (with some people receiving multiple cards and others receiving no cards) and the redrawing of electoral districts even though census results had not been published. Fru Ndi said that the election would not be transparent and blamed President Paul Biya for this; he said the ruling RDPC wanted a two-thirds parliamentary majority so that the constitution could be changed in order to allow Biya to run for president again in 2011. The SDF participated in the election, with 103 candidates from the party seeking seats; according to Fru Ndi, a boycott would be useless.

Voter turnout in the election was reportedly low, with one estimate placing turnout in Douala at about 20%, although the Minister of Territorial Administration, Marafa Hamidou Yaya, said late on the day of the election that turnout was "very honorable" across the country. He also said that the election had gone smoothly and without major incidents. Others, however, said that there were irregularities, including widespread cases of people being allowed to vote with only voter registration cards and not identity cards as well. The opposition denounced the election as fraudulent, with Fru Ndi labelling it a "sham"; it alleged that ballot papers were withheld from some people, that the indelible ink could be washed off, and that one town in the north did not receive ballot papers. There were also opposition allegations that some people were enabled to vote for the RDPC in place of other voters.

In addition to the SDF, the UDC also alleged fraud, and the SDF and the UDC announced that they would appeal in every district where they were defeated. Another opposition party, the Alliance of Democratic Forces (AFP), said that it would not appeal because it considered the legal system so corrupt that it would be useless to do so.

President Biya, voting in Yaoundé, said that he expected "a comfortable majority, which will enable me to build and modernise the country." He said that campaigning occurred "in a calm, serene and peaceful atmosphere", and expressed his hope that this atmosphere would remain and that people would accept the results.

== Results ==
Following the announcement of the results, 103 appeals were filed with the Supreme Court by a number of parties; most requested the annulment of results in certain districts, although some sought only a neutral recount. The UNDP filed the most appeals, with 33, while the SDF filed 30, the Union of the Peoples of Cameroon (UPC) filed six, and the RDPC filed four. Fru Ndi said on 2 August that the entire elections should be annulled due to fraud, claiming that if the election had been "free and transparent", the SDF would have won a majority in both the parliamentary and municipal elections.

On 10 August, final results were announced by the Supreme Court. The RDPC won 140 seats, the SDF won 14 seats, the UNDP and the UDC won four seats each, and the Progressive Movement won one seat. The Supreme Court annulled the election in five districts, leaving 17 seats vacant until new elections are held there. Of the 163 deputies elected, there were 23 women, 14% of the total.

=== Partial re-run ===
On 29 August it was announced that the elections in the five electoral districts where the results were cancelled—Wouri-East, Mayo-Tsanaga-North, Nyong and Kellé, Mungo South, and Haut-Nkam—would be held on 30 September. Campaigning for the partial election began on 15 September.

Provisional results showed the RDPC winning 13 of the 17 vacant seats, with the SDF winning two and the UNDP winning two. The RDPC won majorities in three of the five districts at stake, Haut-Nkam, Moungo-South, and Nyong-and-Kellé, taking all three of the available seats in each of those districts. In Wouri-East, the SDF won a plurality, with the RDPC close behind, and the two parties each took two of the four available seats there. In Mayo-Tsanaga-North, the RPDC won a plurality, with the UNDP close behind, and the two parties each took two of the four available seats there. The SDF disputed these results, with Fru Ndi claiming that it had actually won six seats: he said that it had won a majority (over 52%) in Wouri-East, giving it all four of those seats, and that it had also won one additional seat in Haut-Nkam and another additional seat in Mayo-Tsanaga-North.

On 10 October the Supreme Court ruled that six appeals regarding the partial election were inadmissible, and rejected two other appeals. It confirmed the final results of the partial election on 15 October, giving the RDPC 13 seats (and a new total of 153), the SDF and UNDP won two seats each, giving them 16 and six seats respectively.

Party	Votes	%	Seats	+/–
Cameroon People's Democratic Movement	2,105,503	67.30	153	+4
Social Democratic Front	425,435	13.60	16	–6
National Union for Democracy and Progress	355,903	11.38	6	+5
Cameroon Democratic Union	68,427	2.19	4	–1
Movement for the Defence of the Republic	47,992	1.53	0	–
Union of the Peoples of Cameroon	43,141	1.38	0	–3
Alliance for Democracy and Development	26,936	0.86	0	–
National Alliance for Democracy and Progress	18,361	0.59	0	–
Cameroon Liberation and Development Movement	6,019	0.19	0	–
Union for the Republic	4,806	0.15	0	–
Cameroon Workers and Peasants Party	4,401	0.14	0	–
Movement for Democracy and Progress	3,970	0.13	0	–
Progressive Movement	3,942	0.13	1	–
Cameroonian Revolution of the United People	2,876	0.09	0	–
Socialist Democratic Party	2,425	0.08	0	–
National Movement for the Progress of Cameroon	1,765	0.06	0	–
Cameroonian Rally for the Republic	1,430	0.05	0	–
Union of Democratic Forces of Cameroon	958	0.03	0	–
National Union for the Total Independence of Cameroon	589	0.02	0	–
Action for Meritocracy and Equal Opportunities	583	0.02	0	–
Party of Unified Workers of Camaroun	543	0.02	0	–
United Socialist Party	541	0.02	0	–
Cameroonian National Congress	536	0.02	0	–
African Movement for New Independence and Democracy	508	0.02	0	–
Cameroon United Front	271	0.01	0	–
Cameroonian Ecologists Movement	245	0.01	0	–
Patriotic People's Liberation Front	186	0.01	0	–
Liberal Democrat Party	160	0.01	0	–
Cameroonian Democrats Movement	104	0.00	0	–
National Rally for Democracy and Development	96	0.00	0	–
Total	3,128,652	100.00	180	0
Valid votes	3,128,652	96.42		
Invalid/blank votes	116,176	3.58		
Total votes	3,244,828	100.00		
Registered voters/turnout	5,067,846	64.03		
Source: CLEA

=== Local elections ===
In the local elections for the 363 town councils, provisional results from the Ministry of Territorial Administration and Decentralization showed the RDPC winning control of 310 councils, the SDF winning 21, the UNDP 13, the UDC eight, the MDR five, the UPC three, and the National Alliance for Democracy and the People (ANDP) one. The RDPC was said to have won all of the councils in Yaoundé and five of the six councils in Douala; the SDF was credited with winning the remaining council in Douala, the 4th district. 216 requests for annulment regarding the local elections were filed with the Supreme Court.

Along with the five districts where the parliamentary election was cancelled, the municipal elections in Lobo were also re-run on 30 September, and in early September the Supreme Court cancelled the municipal results in a further nine electoral districts (Bana, Bafang, Bafoussam III, Kekem, Peté, Matom, Messondo, Mokolo, and Douala V), with new elections there also planned for the same date. In Lobo, the RDPC won the 30 September vote overwhelmingly, with nearly 90%, according to provisional results.

== Aftermath ==
On 14 August Biya expressed a desire for opposition parties to participate in the government. Two days later Fru Ndi said that the SDF would only join the government if it would follow certain policies: decentralization and federalism, greater priority to the social sector, the establishment of an independent electoral commission, the reduction of taxes to encourage investment, and the improvement of living standards. The SDF did not join the government in the cabinet reshuffle on September 7.

The newly elected National Assembly held its first session on 21 August. Although 17 seats were still vacant, only a two-thirds majority was necessary for the National Assembly to meet. On the same day, a joint statement of the American, British, and Dutch embassies criticized the election due to irregularities and urged the creation of an independent electoral commission. Cavaye Yeguie Djibril was re-elected as President of the National Assembly on August 31.
