= 2011 Cameroonian presidential election =

Fifth re-election of Paul Biya

- 9 October 2011
- Registered: 7,251,651
- Turnout: 68.28% (▼13.95pp)
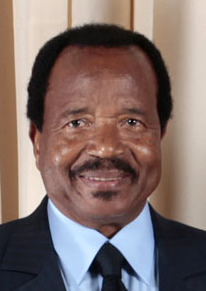

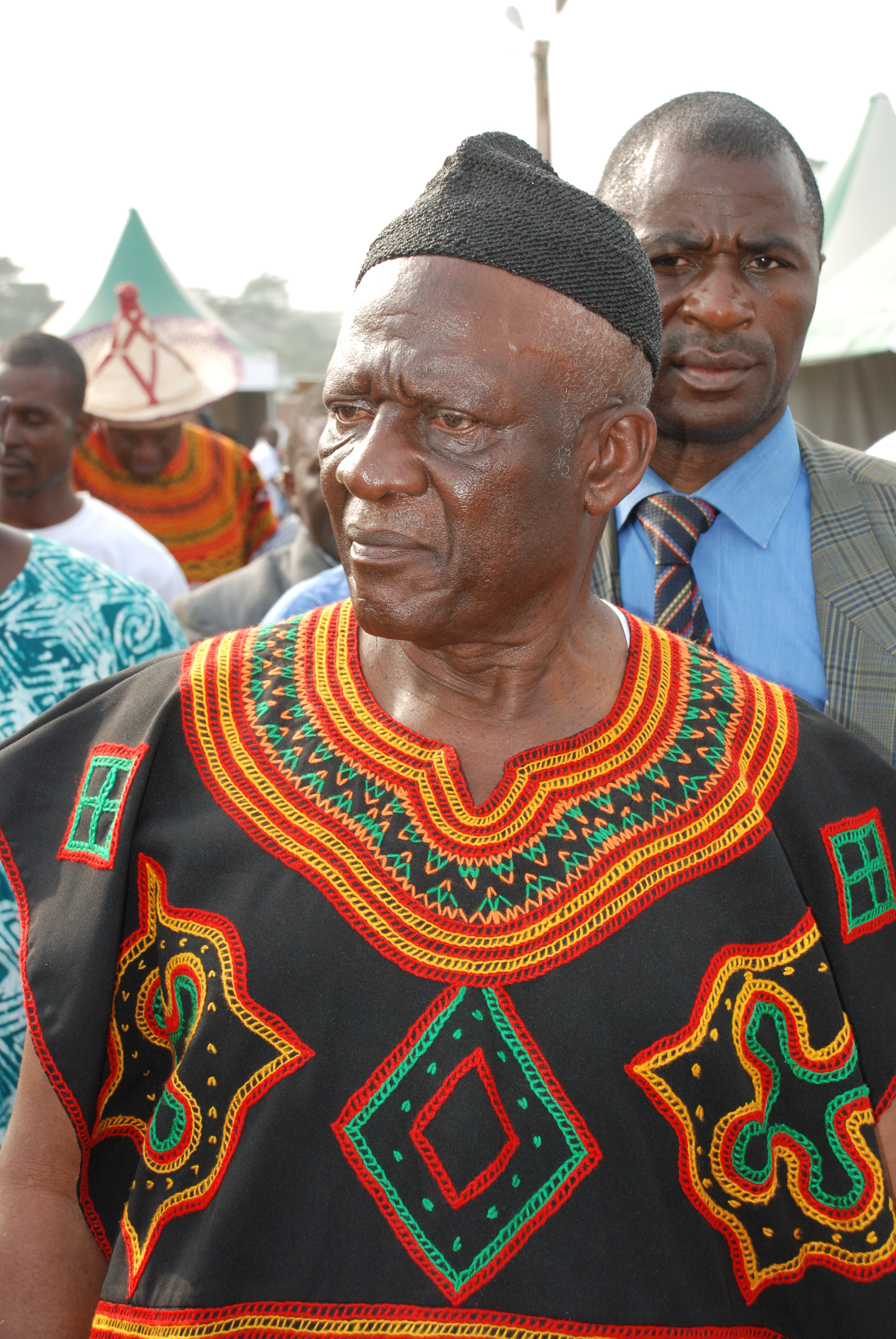
Nominee	Paul Biya	John Fru Ndi
Party	RDPC	SDF
Popular vote	3,772,527	518,175
Percentage	77.99%	10.71%
- Results by department Biya: 40-50% 50–60% 60–70% 70–80% 80–90% >90% Fru Ndi: 40-50% 50–60% 70–80% Ndam Njoya: 40-50%
President before election
Paul Biya
RDPC
Elected President
Paul Biya
RDPC

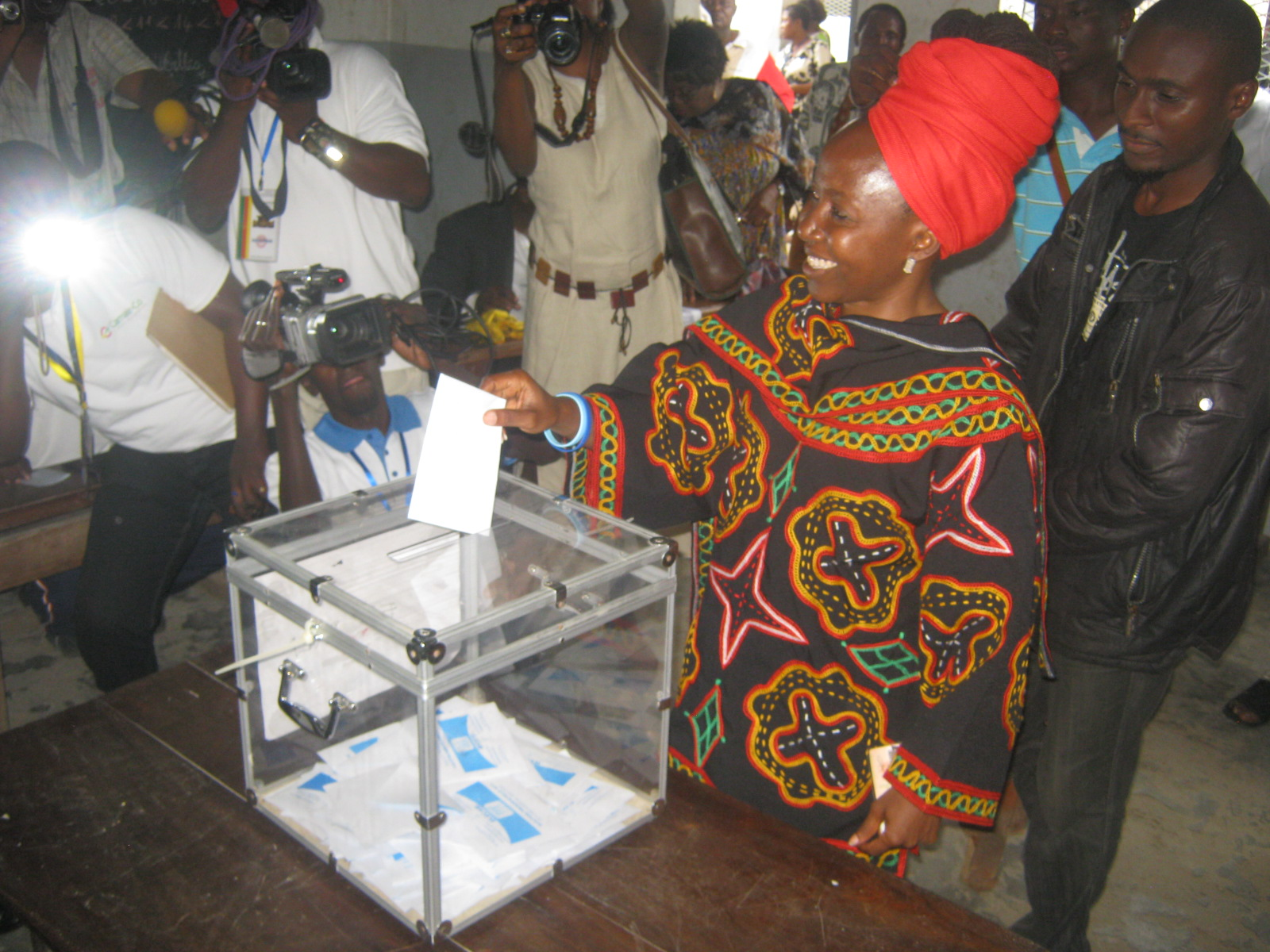
Candidate Kah Walla casting her vote in Douala

Presidential elections were held in Cameroon on 9 October 2011. Incumbent President Paul Biya, in power since 1982, stood for another term after a constitutional amendment passed in 2008 eliminated term limits. Biya was re-elected with 78% of the vote.

== Background ==
Some opposition demands regarding voting rights for the diaspora were met before the election, when lawmakers passed an amendment to the electoral law in July 2011.

== Candidates ==
Long-time opposition leader John Fru Ndi also stood as a candidate in the election. Fifty other people submitted paperwork to ELECAM, the electoral commission, seeking to stand as presidential candidates. Observers viewed the opposition as anemic and expected Biya to easily win re-election.

Daniel Soh Fone of the United Socialist Party withdrew before the election, giving his support to Biya.

== Conduct ==
The United States Ambassador to Cameroon, Robert P. Jackson and former colonial power France have criticized the election, citing irregularities. Several political parties claimed they would challenge the results.

The mission Chief of the African Union's Observer Mission in Cameroon, former Prime Minister of Mali Ibrahim Boubacar Keïta stated in his report that the African Union judges found the vote to be "free, transparent and credible". La Francophonie and the Commonwealth also praised the election. Fred Mitchell, former Foreign Minister of The Bahamas, led the Commonwealth mission to Cameroon; he said that there were no signs that people were coerced to vote and the election was conducted peacefully.

== Results ==
Candidate	Party	Votes	%
Paul Biya	Cameroon People's Democratic Movement	3,772,527	77.99
John Fru Ndi	Social Democratic Front	518,175	10.71
Garga Haman Adji	Alliance for Democracy and Development	155,348	3.21
Adamou Ndam Njoya	Cameroon Democratic Union	83,860	1.73
Paul Abine Ayah	People's Action Party	61,158	1.26
Kah Walla	Cameroon People's Party	34,639	0.72
Albert Dzongang	Dynamic for National Renaissance	26,396	0.55
Jean de Dieu Momo	Democrat Patriots for the Development of Cameroon	23,791	0.49
Jean-Jacques Ekindi	Progressive Movement	21,593	0.45
Bernard Muna	Alliance of Progressive Forces	18,444	0.38
Esther Dang	Bloc for the Reconstruction and Economic Independence of Cameroon	15,775	0.33
Olivier Anicet Bilé	Union for Fraternity and Prosperity	15,202	0.31
Anicet Ekane	African Movement for New Independence and Democracy	11,081	0.23
Victorin Hameni Bieuleu	Union of Democratic Forces of Cameroon	10,615	0.22
Fritz Pierre Ngo	Movement of Cameroonian Ecologists	9,259	0.19
Jean Njeunga	United Front of Cameroon	9,219	0.19
Isaac Feuzeu	Movement for the Emergence and Rise of Citizen	9,216	0.19
Hubert Kamgang	Union of African Populations	8,250	0.17
Simon Pierre Atangana Nsoe	Great Cameroon	8,032	0.17
Marcus Lontouo	Cameroonian National Congress	7,875	0.16
George Dobgima Nyamndi	Social Liberal Congress	5,925	0.12
Joachim Tabi Owono	Action for Meritocracy and Equal Opportunities	5,795	0.12
Daniel Soh Fone	United Socialist Party	5,074	0.10
Total		4,837,249	100.00
Valid votes		4,837,249	97.69
Invalid/blank votes		114,185	2.31
Total votes		4,951,434	100.00
Registered voters/turnout		7,251,651	68.28
Source: Elections Cameroon, African Elections Database

== Aftermath ==
Biya was sworn in for another term as president in a ceremony held at the National Assembly on 3 November.
