= Adamou Ndam Njoya =

Cameroonian politician (1942–2020)

President of the Cameroon Democratic Union
- In office 26 April 1991 – 7 March 2020
- Preceded by: Party established
- Succeeded by: Hermine Patricia Tomaïno Ndam Njoya

Mayor of Foumban
- In office 1996 – 9 February 2020
- Succeeded by: Hermine Patricia Tomaïno Ndam Njoya

Member of the National Assembly for Noun
- In office 1997–2007

Minister of National Education
- In office December 1977 – July 1980
- Prime Minister: Paul Biya
- Preceded by: Bernard Bidias à Ngon
- Succeeded by: René Zé Nguélé

Personal details
- Born: May 8, 1942 Foumban, French Cameroon
- Died: March 7, 2020 (aged 77) Yaoundé, Cameroon
- Party: UDC
- Spouse: Hermine Patricia Tomaïno Ndam Njoya
- Children: 5
- Profession: Lawyer, professor, author, politician

Adamou Ndam Njoya (8 May 1942 – 7 March 2020) was a Cameroonian politician, lawyer, author, and professor. He was Minister of National Education from 1977 to 1980, and the President of the Cameroon Democratic Union until his death on 7 March 2020. He was replaced by his wife Hermine Patricia Tomaïno Ndam Njoya as Mayor of Foumban, a position he held since 1996. From 1997 to 2007, he was a Deputy in the National Assembly. He unsuccessfully ran as a presidential candidate in the 1992, 2004, 2011 and 2018 elections.

== Education ==
Ndam Njoya was born at Njika, Foumban, West Province, Cameroon, on 8 May 1942. He received his early education at Foumban and Nkongsamba and his undergraduate at General Leclerc College in Yaoundé. He went to France for his advanced education, receiving an MA and a PhD degree in public international law and political science at the University of Paris (Panthéon). Ndam Njoya studied diplomacy at the Institut International d'Administration Publique (IIAP), followed by three internships, with the French Ministry of Foreign Affairs, with the French Embassy in London, and with International Organizations at the United Nations European office in Geneva, before returning to Cameroon in 1969.

== Government service ==
Ndam Njoya was briefly Secretary to the Minister of Foreign Affairs from 1969 to 1970. He joined the law faculty at the University of Yaoundé in 1970. Ndam Njoya then worked for the Carnegie Endowment for International Peace in Cameroon as director of the diplomatic training program from 1970 to 1972, and he helped to create the International Relations Institute of Cameroon (IRIC); he was the IRIC's first director from 1972 to 1975. He became a member of the Economic and Social Council of Cameroon in 1974, and he was then appointed as Deputy Minister of Foreign Affairs in the government named on 30 June 1975.

In December 1977, Ndam Njoya was appointed as Minister of National Education. His attempts to introduce stringency and morality into the educational system met with resistance, especially from the wealthy Francophone families who were used to financial incentives determining the success of their children at primary and post-primary institutions. In July 1980, under such pressure, President Ahmadou Ahidjo removed him as Minister of National Education and instead appointed him as Minister Delegate at the Presidency for General Inspection of State and Administrative Reforms, a relatively powerless post. In January 1982, Ahidjo dismissed him from the government.

== Literary career ==
From 1982 to 1990 Ndam Njoya focused on his writing and teaching as well as donating his time to philanthropic endeavours. He has written in the fields of law, political science, history, international relations and political ideas, as well as theatrical pieces, poems, and fiction. He also served as a member of the Executive Bureau of UNESCO from 1985 to 1989, and was the president of the jury of the Grand Prix of Literary Associations 2014.

=== Selected works ===
- Ndam Njoya, Adamou (1975) Prières et chants de louanges à Dieu Ndam et Raynier, Yaoundé, Cameroon;
- Ndam Njoya, Adamou (1976) Le Cameroun dans les relations internationales Librairie générale de droit et de jurisprudence, Paris, ISBN 2-275-01397-0 ;
- Ndam Njoya, Adamou (1977) Njoya : réformateur du royaume Bamoun N.E.A. (Nouvelles éditions africaines), Abidjan, Ivory Coast, ISBN 2-85809-101-3 ;
- Ndam Njoya, Adamou (1982) Les Amo : recueil de poèmes Ndam et Raynier, Yaounde;
- Ndam Njoya, Adamou (1983) Manuel pratique de rédaction administrative et des documents diplomatiques Editions SOPECAM, Yaoundé, Cameroon;

== Political career ==
In December 1990, President Paul Biya again permitted opposition political parties in Cameroon, and Ndam Njoya started gathering together reform-minded politicians. In July 1991, he was briefly arrested along with other opposition politicians, but was quickly released. In September 1991, he announced the formation of the Cameroon Democratic Union (Union démocratique du Cameroun, UDC), a political party. In his party statements Ndam Njoya stressed decentralisation of government and respect for the rights of minorities.

Ndam Njoya was the UDC candidate in Cameroon's first multiparty presidential election, held in October 1992, and he took fourth place with 3.6% of the vote. In Foumban, his stronghold, he received 59% of the vote, but his success was confined to West Province, where he received 68,284 of his 107,411 total votes (17.58% of the vote in West Province). He was elected as Mayor of Foumban in the January 1996 municipal election and was additionally elected to the National Assembly in the 1997 parliamentary election as a UDC candidate in Noun.

On 13 January 2001, Ndam Njoya and various other party leaders participated in an unauthorised protest in Yaoundé against the National Election Observatory, believing that it would not be an impartial body. The protest was dispersed by security forces, and Ndam Njoya, along with the other party leaders, was detained for five hours.

In the presidential election held on 11 October 2004, all of the opposition parties agreed to support a single candidate against Biya. After Ndam Njoya was chosen by the coalition caucus, John Fru Ndi pulled the Social Democratic Front (SDF) out of the coalition and ran separately. As a result, Ndam Njoya, representing a coalition of political parties, officially received only 4.47% of the vote, placing third behind SDF candidate John Fru Ndi at 17.4%; President Biya won the election with 70.9% of the vote, according to official results. As has become standard in Cameroon elections, "massive fraud" was alleged. Ndam Njoya received his best score in West Province, where he won 16.71% of the vote.

Since 2004, Ndam Njoya has remained Chairman of the Cameroon Democratic Union, speaking out against corruption in government and continuing to work for decentralisation. He was re-elected for another five-year term as CDU chairman at a party congress in Yaoundé, attended by about 3,000 delegates, on 30 November–2 December 2006; there was no challenger for the position.

After serving two terms in the National Assembly, Ndam Njoya chose not to run again for a seat in the July 2007 parliamentary election. He did, however, run again for his position as Mayor of Foumban and was re-elected, defeating Njankouo Lamere, the Deputy Minister of Finance.

Ndam Njoya said in October 2007 that electoral fraud had produced so much injustice that it could potentially lead to civil war. Speaking on 17 December 2007, he expressed his opposition to a proposal to amend the constitution to remove term limits on the office of president, saying that only two five-year terms should be allowed and that presidential elections should be conducted under a two-round voting system.

In the October 2011 presidential election, Ndam Njoya again stood as the Cameroon Democratic Union candidate, but without broader support. Officially, he received 1.73% of the vote and placed fourth, behind John Fru Ndi (second) and Garga Haman Adji (third). Officially President Paul Biya received over 77% of the vote. He stood again in the 2018 presidential election, gaining 61,220 votes, a 1.73% share of the total.

Without opposition, Ndam Njoya was re-elected by acclamation as President of the UDC on 9 May 2016 at a party convention in Yaoundé.

== Personal life ==
At the time of his death, he was married to Hermine Patricia Tomaïno Ndam Njoya, who became Mayor of Foumban on 9 February 2020. Ndam Njoya left five children.

He also was a personal advocate of interfaith dialogue and sat on the Board of World Religious Leaders for The Elijah Interfaith Institute.

== See also ==
- Grand Prix of literary Associations
