= 2002 Cameroonian parliamentary election =

- 30 June 2002
- All 180 seats in the National Assembly; 90 seats needed for a majority
Party	Leader	Seats	+/–
RDPC	Paul Biya	149	+40
SDF	John Fru Ndi	22	−21
UDC	Adamou Ndam Njoya	5	0
UPC	Augustin Frédéric Kodock	3	+2
UNDP	Bello Bouba Maigari	1	−12
This lists parties that won seats. See the complete results below.
Prime Minister before	Prime Minister after
Peter Mafany Musonge; RDPC	Peter Mafany Musonge; RDPC

Parliamentary elections were held in Cameroon on 30 June 2002. The result was a victory for the ruling Cameroon People's Democratic Movement, which won 149 of the 180 seats. In 17 constituencies the result was cancelled by the Supreme Court due to irregularities and the election re-run on 15 September.

== Results ==
Party	Seats	+/–
Cameroon People's Democratic Movement	149	+40
Social Democratic Front	22	–21
Cameroon Democratic Union	5	0
Union of the Peoples of Cameroon	3	+2
National Union for Democracy and Progress	1	–12
Liberty Movement of Cameroon Youth	0	–1
Total	180	0
Source: African Elections Database
