= Bashéo =

- Commune and town
- Location in Cameroon
- Coordinates: 9°40′N 13°22′E
- Country: Cameroon
- Time zone: UTC+1 (WAT)

Bashéo is a town and commune in Cameroon.

== See also ==
- Communes of Cameroon
