= Cameroon Democratic Union =

Political party in Cameroon

Cameroon Democratic Union Union démocratique du Cameroun
- President: Patricia Tomaïno Ndam Njoya
- Founder: Adamou Ndam Njoya
- Founded: 26 April 1991; 35 years ago
- Headquarters: Yaoundé, Cameroon
- Ideology: Anti-corruption; Decentralization
- Colors: Blue
- Senate: 0 / 100
- National Assembly: 4 / 180

The Cameroon Democratic Union (French: Union Démocratique du Cameroun) is a political party in Cameroon. It was founded by Adamou Ndam Njoya, a former Minister of National Education under President Ahmadou Ahidjo, on 26 April 1991.

The CDU boycotted the March 1992 parliamentary election, along with the Social Democratic Front (SDF) due to the government's failure to meet opposition demands, which included the establishment of an independent electoral commission to oversee the election. In the May 1997 parliamentary election, the UDC won five seats, all of them in Noun Department in the West Province. It then boycotted the October 1997 presidential election, along with the Social Democratic Front (SDF) and the National Union for Democracy and Progress (UNDP).

In the parliamentary election held on 30 June and 15 September 2002, the UDC won five seats, all in Noun Department, out of 180 seats nationwide. Adamou Ndam Njoya and John Fru Ndi failed to agree on the designation of an all-opposition single candidate for the presidential election of 11 October 2004. As a result, Ndam Njoya represented a coalition of political parties, the Coalition for National Reconciliation and Reconstruction, and placed third in the final ballot count, winning 4.47% (168,318 votes).

Njoya was re-elected for another five-year term as CDU Chairman at a party congress in Yaoundé, attended by about 3,000 delegates, on 30 November–2 December 2006; there was no challenger for the position.

The UDC won four out of the 163 initially declared seats in the July 2007 parliamentary election; it won all four of these seats in the Noun Centre constituency, where the party received 58.28% of the vote. The UDC did not gain any seats in the partial election, held in September, for 17 seats where the initial results were annulled.

At the time of the 2007 election, the CDU formed an alliance with the Progressive Movement (MP) of Jean-Jacques Ekindi, agreeing not to run candidates in the Wouri Centre constituency, where the MP was competing.

== Election results ==
=== Presidential Elections ===
Election	Party candidate	Votes	%	Result
1992	Adamou Ndam Njoya	107,411	3.62%	Lost ✗
1997	Boycotted			
2004	Adamou Ndam Njoya	168,318	4.48%	Lost ✗
2011	Adamou Ndam Njoya	83,860	1.73%	Lost ✗
2018	Adamou Ndam Njoya	61,220	1.73%	Lost ✗
2025	Hermine Patricia Tomaïno Ndam Njoya	76,721	1.66%	Lost ✗

=== National Assembly elections ===
Election	Party leader	Votes	%	Seats	+/–	Position	Government
1992	Adamou Ndam Njoya	Boycotted		0 / 180			Extra-parliamentary
1997	Adamou Ndam Njoya	76,644	2.65%	5 / 180	▲5	▲4th	Opposition
2002	Adamou Ndam Njoya			5 / 180	Steady	▲3rd	Opposition
2007	Adamou Ndam Njoya	68,427	2.19%	4 / 180	▼1	▼4th	Opposition
2013	Adamou Ndam Njoya	71,926	1.79%	4 / 180	Steady	4th	Opposition
2020	Adamou Ndam Njoya			4 / 180	Steady	▼5th	Opposition
