= 2004 Cameroonian presidential election =

Fourth re-election of Paul Biya

- 11 October 2004
- Registered: 4,657,748
- Turnout: 82.23% (▼0.87pp)
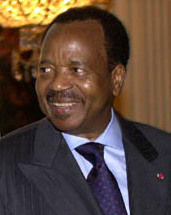

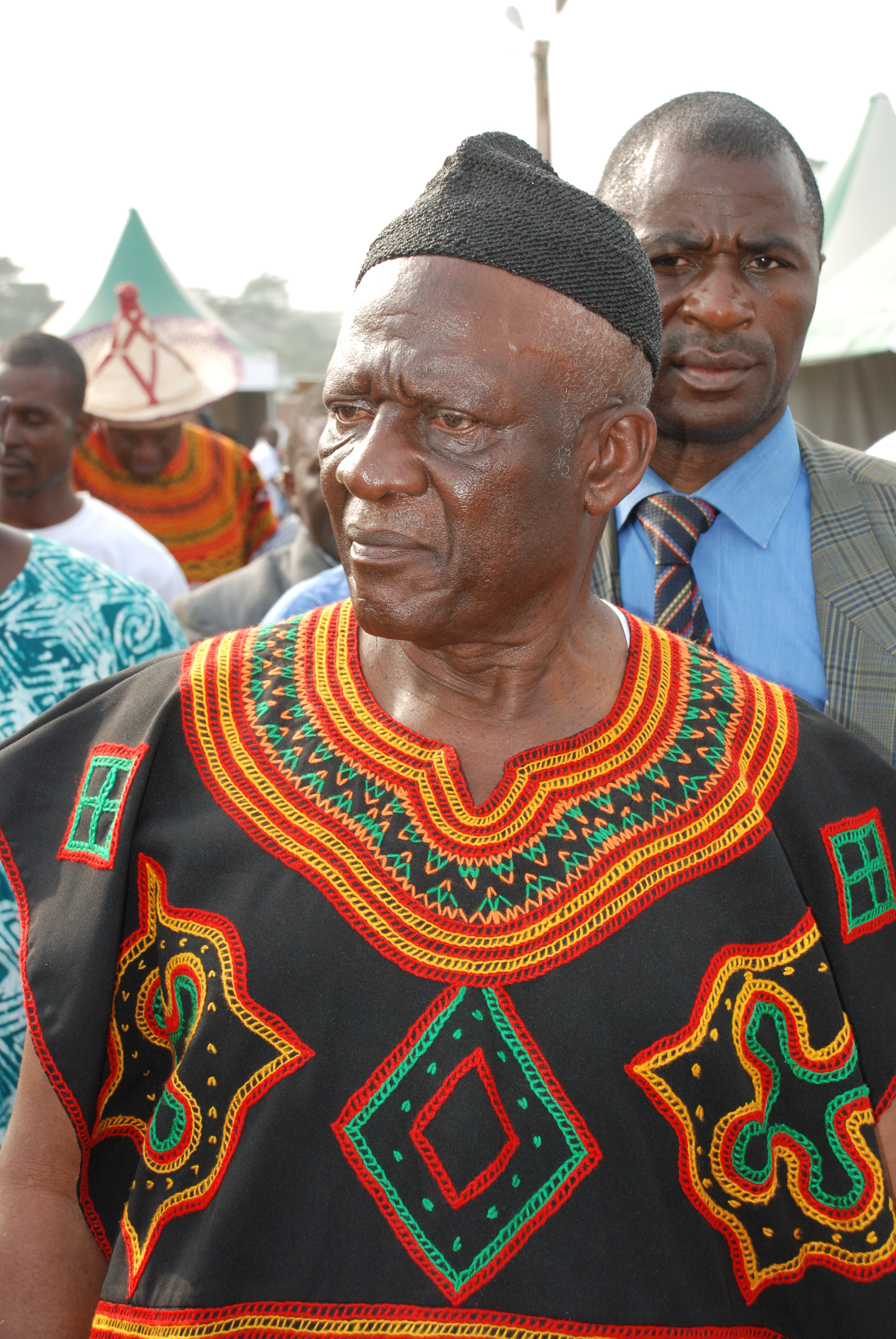
Nominee	Paul Biya	John Fru Ndi
Party	RDPC	SDF
Popular vote	2,665,359	654,066
Percentage	70.92%	17.40%
President before election
Paul Biya
RDPC
Elected President
Paul Biya
RDPC

Presidential elections were held in Cameroon on 11 October 2004. Incumbent President Paul Biya was easily re-elected in an election which the opposition claimed had seen widespread electoral fraud.

== Background ==
Biya came to power in 1982 and by 2004 had ruled Cameroon for 22 years. Multi-party democracy was introduced for the 1992 election but Biya was accused of rigging the election to ensure victory. The last presidential election in 1997 saw Biya re-elected with 93% of the vote after opposition parties boycotted the election. The expectation before the 2004 election was that Biya would be re-elected to another term of office, with no chance that anyone else would be able or allowed to defeat him.

== Candidates ==
After announcing that the presidential election would be held on 11 October, Biya confirmed on 16 September that he would stand for re-election. Before his announcement there had been calls from groups such as university lecturers and over 100 former footballers for him to stand again.

Biya was opposed by 15 other candidates after the opposition failed to agree on a single candidate. A 10-party coalition nominated Adamou Ndam Njoya for the election, but his candidacy was rejected by the veteran opposition politician John Fru Ndi who decided to stand as well. Fru Nidi said that he should have been selected instead of Njoya as Fru Nidi's Social Democratic Front had more elected members. Fru Ndi was an anglophone from western Cameroon who had stood in the 1992 election, while Adamou Ndam Njoya was a Muslim francophone from northern Cameroon.

There were also reports that Biya backed some of the candidates so they could act as spoilers.

== Campaign ==
Biya initially did not campaign in the election and only made his first campaign stop within the last week before polling day. Biya described his opponents as inexperienced and said that he was only person who could prevent anarchy in Cameroon. He also pledged to improve education, health and women's rights, as well as decentralising and developing industry and tourism. One of Biya's campaign slogans was "Free mosquito nets for pregnant mothers" but there was significant scepticism over the pledges made by Biya after the failure to achieve ones made in previous elections.

The opposition candidates said that the government had mismanaged the economy and failed to address widespread poverty. John Fru Ndi attracted the most supporters to his rallies of any of the opposition candidates, with up to 30,000 attending his rally in Douala. He pledged to restore previous wage scales for workers, to reduce corruption and poverty, scrap fees at university and remove taxation from small businesses.

== Conduct ==
Opposition candidates criticised the election as having seen significant amounts of multiple voting and that security forces had harassed opposition agents at polling stations. They described the election as having been rigged and appealed to the Supreme Court to annul the results. However most international observers said that despite some shortcomings the election was mainly satisfactory. These included a group of former United States congressmen who called the election "fair and transparent"; however, the International Federation of Human Rights Leagues dissented and said that the election had seen many irregularities.

== Results ==
On 25 October 2004 the Supreme Court confirmed the results and rejected the complaints from the opposition. The final results saw Biya secure 70.9% of the vote against 17.4% for his nearest rival John Fru Ndi.

Candidate	Party	Votes	%
Paul Biya	Cameroon People's Democratic Movement	2,665,359	70.92
John Fru Ndi	Social Democratic Front	654,066	17.40
Adamou Ndam Njoya	Cameroon Democratic Union	168,318	4.48
Garga Haman Adji	Alliance for Democracy and Development	140,372	3.74
Justin Mouafo	Nationalism of Cameroonian Patriots	14,915	0.40
Yondo Mandengue Black	Social Movement for New Democracy	13,601	0.36
Anicet Ekane	Social Movement for New Democracy	13,290	0.35
Fritz Pierre Ngo	Cameroon Ecological Movement	13,122	0.35
Jean Michel Tekam	Party of Social Democracy	12,785	0.34
Victorin Hameni Bieuleu	Union of Democratic Forces	11,920	0.32
Boniface Forbin	Justice and Development Party	10,542	0.28
Djeukam Tchameni	Movement for Democracy and Interdependence	10,539	0.28
Jean-Jacques Ekindi	Progressive Movement	10,158	0.27
Hubert Kamgang	Union of African Populations	7,508	0.20
George Dobgima Nyamndi	Social Liberal Congress	6,730	0.18
Gustave Essaka	Cameroon Integral Democracy	4,996	0.13
Total		3,758,221	100.00
Valid votes		3,758,221	98.12
Invalid/blank votes		72,051	1.88
Total votes		3,830,272	100.00
Registered voters/turnout		4,657,748	82.23
Source: African Elections Database
