= Wouri (department) =

- Department
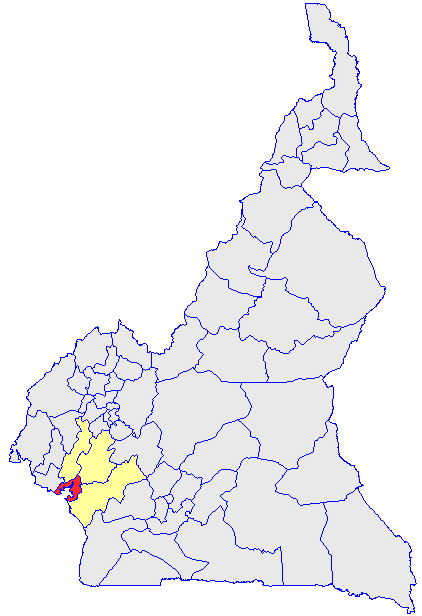
- Department location in Cameroon
- Coordinates: 4°03′19″N 9°45′43″E
- Country: Cameroon
- Province: Littoral Province
- Capital: Douala

Area
  - Total: 923 km^{2} (356 sq mi)

Population (2007)
  - Total: 1,798,737
- Time zone: UTC+1 (WAT)

Wouri is a department of the Littoral Province in Cameroon. It forms the area around the major city of Douala, and is named after the major Wouri River. The department covers an area of 923 km^{2} and as of 2001 had a total population of 1,514,978. For 2007 the estimate had risen to 1,798,737 (Institut national de la statistique).
