= Marafa Hamidou Yaya =

Cameroonian politician

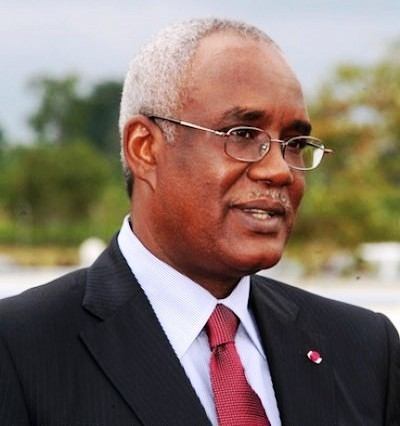

Minister of Territorial Administration
- In office 2009–2011

Personal details
- Born: 1952 (age 73–74) Garoua, Cameroon
- Party: Cameroon People's Democratic Movement
- Education: University of Kansas

Marafa Hamidou Yaya (born 1952) is a Cameroonian politician, former minister, and senior member of the ruling party. He held several government positions before being arrested in 2012 in connection with a corruption case.

== Early life and education ==
Marafa Hamidou Yaya was born in 1952 in Garoua, located in the northern region of Cameroon. He comes from the Fulani aristocracy of Garoua. Marafa Hamidou Yaya completed his entire primary and secondary education in Garoua, graduating in 1973 with a baccalaureate D at the lycee of Garoua. after that, he earned a Bachelor's degree in Geology from the University of Yaounde in 1976. He pursued higher education in the United States, at the University of Kansas, where he graduated as an engineer specializing in petrochemistry.

== Professional career ==
Marafa's professional journey in Cameroon began after his return, he found work as a petroleum engineer. His career path included a few months at Elf-Serepca in Douala, followed by a long period at the Société Nationale des Hydrocarbures (SNH). There, he initially directed the Exploitation Production Department and then became a Technical Adviser, with a focus on the company's interactions with the International Monetary Fund (IMF) and the World Bank.

== Political career ==
Marafa's political career flourished inside the CPDM, Cameroon's governing party, becoming a close ally of President Paul Biya. He served as Special Adviser to the President before being appointed Secretary General of the Presidency from 1997 to 2001. In 2001, he became Minister of State and, from August 2002, served as Minister of Territorial Administration and Decentralization a strategic post in the Cameroonian government. During his tenure, he was known to push for decentralization reforms. He was also chairman of the Board of FEICOM (the Cameroonian local government development fund).

== Imprisonment and controversies ==
On 16 April 2012, Marafa Hamidou Yaya was arrested by Cameroonian authorities and detained in a military camp under the Secretariat of State for Defence. He was tried and convicted by the Special Criminal Court in September 2012 on charges of "intellectual complicity" in a scheme to embezzle funds related to the purchase of a presidential aircraft. In May 2016, the Supreme Court of Cameroon confirmed his conviction but reduced his sentence to 20 years in prison. Human rights bodies and observers have raised concerns about the fairness of the trial, the legal basis of the charge ("intellectual complicity"), and possible political motivations behind his prosecution. A call for his release was issued by the United Nations' Working Group on Arbitrary Detention, following their determination that his detention lacked legal justification.

== Literary work ==
Despite being incarcerated, Marafa has remained politically active via open letters, essays, and public statements. In 2025, he announced the publication of a new essay titled Le choix de l'espoir: Lettres de prison (2012-2025), documenting his experience and vision from incarceration. While detained, Marafa Hamidou Yaya wrote and published a book titled Le choix de l'action ("The Choice of Action") in late 2014. The book recounts his experience as Minister of Territorial Administration and Decentralization, covering the challenges he faced, including electoral crises and social uprisings, as well as his vision for administrative reforms and Cameroon's future development.
