= African Peoples Union =

Political party in Cameroon

African Peoples Union (in French: Union des Populations Africaines) is a political party in Cameroon led by the Panafrican scholar Hubert Kamgang. The party was founded in 1996. Kamgang was a candidate in the 2004 Cameroonian presidential election under the APU.

UPA is Panafrican and supports the creation of a 'United States of Africa'.
