= Joshua Osih =

Cameroonian politician and current President of Cameroon (born 1968)

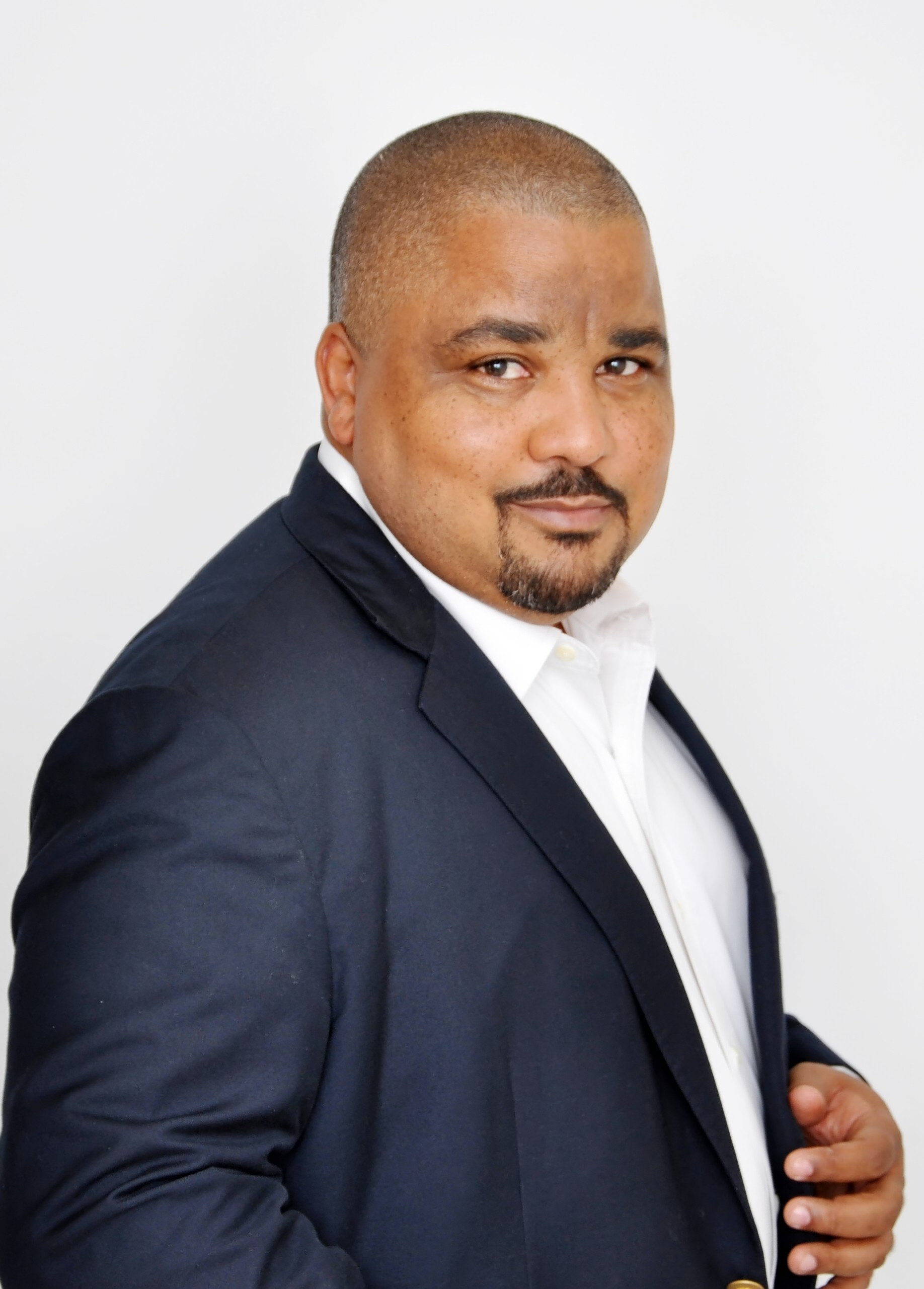
- Osih in 2013

Chairman of the Social Democratic Front
- Incumbent
- Assumed office 28 October 2023
- Preceded by: John Fru Ndi

Member of the National Assembly for Littoral Region
- Incumbent
- Assumed office 29 October 2013

Personal details
- Born: Joshua Nambangi Osih; 9 December 1968 (age 57) Kumba, Southwest Region (Cameroon)
- Party: Social Democratic Front
- Occupation: Politician

Joshua Osih (born Joshua Nambangi Osih; 9 December 1968) is a Cameroonian politician. He was the vice president of the main opposition party in Cameroon, the Social Democratic Front (Cameroon) (SDF), and the first Anglophone Cameroonian to serve as a Parliamentarian in Douala, capital of the Littoral Region (Cameroon) in 2013. He is also the chairman of Camport PLC in Cameroon.

Osih was the SDF candidate for the 2018 presidential elections in Cameroon.

== Early life and career ==
Joshua Osih was born to Cameroonian father Rev. Dr. Reuben Osih, and Swiss national mother Therese Osih. Commonly referred to as Josh, Joshua is married to Tina Osih, and has three sons.

Osih holds an MBA in Leadership and Sustainability, and has more than 25 years of experience in the aviation industry, notably in operations and management. An established entrepreneur in Cameroon for the past 18 years, he conducts business in aviation, ecotourism, hospitality and aquaculture, and has over 200 employees. He is also the founder and managing director of the notable companies Camport PLC and Africa Travel Management.

Osih is a Member of the Cameroon Parliament for the Wouri Centre constituency in Douala. This constituency represents about 65% of all tax income in Cameroon, although it only has about 600 000 inhabitants of Cameroon's population of 23.44 million. Osih is both Vice President of the Finance and Budget Committee of the National Assembly, and Special Rapporteur for the National Assembly. Additionally, he is in charge of the Finance and Administration sectors of the executive. He is Deputy General Rapporteur in charge of state income, Vice Coordinator of the Hope for the Youth caucus, and a member of multiple parliamentary friendship groups.

== Legislative career ==
Osih joined the Social Democratic Front (SDF) in March 1991 in Douala. In 2002 he was elected regional chairman of the Social Democratic Front for the South West region. In 2006, he was elected 2nd Vice Chairman of the party. In 2012 and 2018 was elected in both instances as 1st Vice Chairman of the party. At the 2018 Extraordinary convention of the party that concludes the party's primaries, he was elected as the SDF's presidential candidate for the 2018 Cameroonian Presidential election.

As flag bearer for the SDF, he was the hope of millions of Cameroonians who have never experienced a democratic transition since independence and strongly believed that these elections would be the last chance for a democratic change to occur and liberate them from an 86-year-old incumbent, Paul Biya who had been in office for 35 years representing a 60-year-old regime.

In 2013, Osih became the first Anglophone Cameroonian to serve as a Parliamentarian in Douala, in the Littoral Region of Cameroon. He was the vice president of the SDF until 24 February 2018. He is also the chairman of Camport PLC in Cameroon.

On Thursday 21 July 2016 on the TV programme Espace Politique aired on Cameroon state television network CRTV, SDF chairman John Fru Ndi declared that Osih would be the SDF candidate in the 2018 presidential election in Cameroon. This was confirmed in the Bamenda Congress Hall when he defeated fellow candidate Forbi Nchinda in the election to represent the SDF in the 2018 presidential elections.

On October 28, 2023, Joshua Osih was elected for five years as head of the presidency of his political party the SDF..

== See also ==
- List of Cameroonians
