= Elections Cameroon =

Independent electoral commission of Cameroon

- Élections Cameroon

Agency overview
- Jurisdiction: Cameroon
- Headquarters: Yaoundé, Cameroon
- Website: www.elecam.cm

Elections Cameroon (French: Élections Cameroon), commonly known as ELECAM, is the independent electoral management body responsible for organizing, managing, and supervising elections and referendums in Cameroon. It functions as Cameroon's equivalent to Nigeria's Independent National Electoral Commission (INEC).

== History and establishment ==
ELECAM was created by Law No. 2006/011 of 29 December 2006 and began operations in 2008, replacing the National Elections Observatory. The body was established to ensure the conduct of free, fair, and transparent elections in accordance with the Cameroonian Electoral Code.

== Structure ==
ELECAM has a dual structure:

Electoral Board: The decision-making body of ELECAM. It scrutinizes candidacy papers, publishes final candidate lists, and oversees the electoral process. The board is composed of 18 members appointed for a non-renewable five-year term.

Directorate General of Elections: The operational arm responsible for voter registration, management of the electoral register, organization of polling operations, and centralization of results. It is headed by a Director General, currently Dr Erik Essousse.

ELECAM maintains regional, divisional, and council branches across Cameroon.

== Mandate and functions ==
Under Section 5 of the Electoral Code, ELECAM is mandated to:

- Organize, manage, and supervise the entire electoral and referendum process
- Ensure compliance with electoral law by all stakeholders
- Manage the biometric voter registration system
- Conduct voter education and civic participation programs

The agency emphasizes its independence, stating that Electoral Board members do not take instructions from any political or administrative authority.

== Leadership ==
As of 2025, the Chairperson of the Electoral Board is Dr Enow Abrams Egbe. He was born on 30 December 1961 in Kepelle, Mamfe, Manyu Division, South-West Region.

Egbe holds a PhD in Public Administration from the University of Buea and is a graduate of the National School of Administration and Magistracy (ENAM). Before joining ELECAM, he served as Governor of Adamawa Region and South Region, and as Inspector General in charge of Electoral Matters at the Ministry of Territorial Administration and Decentralisation.

In June 2025, he evaluated the ELECAM/United Nations Technical Assistance Project for the 2025–2027 electoral cycle. He was also honoured with an award by the African Union for his work in electoral management.

== Recent activities ==
=== 2025 presidential election ===
ELECAM organized the presidential election held on 12 October 2025. The Electoral Board received 83 nomination files and qualified 13 candidates to run. The board barred opposition candidate Maurice Kamto from contesting, citing non-compliance with Section 121 of the electoral code.

=== Voter registration ===
Between January and June 2025, ELECAM registered 373,588 new voters, bringing the total electoral roll to over 8.2 million. In early 2026, an additional 69,844 voters were registered. The body has used mobile biometric registration kits to reach rural and remote areas.

=== International cooperation ===
In May 2025, ELECAM signed a technical assistance convention with the United Nations system for the 2025–2027 electoral cycle. The partnership includes training workshops for electoral staff and multi-stakeholder consultations.

== Challenges ==
ELECAM has operated in a context of security challenges, particularly in the North-West and South-West regions affected by the Anglophone crisis. In 2018, separatists attacked ELECAM staff and destroyed voting materials. Chairperson Enow Abrams Egbe has stated that security measures are put in place to protect voters and polling centers.

The commission has also faced accusations of lacking independence, which it has denied, citing Section 5 of the Electoral Code.

== Electoral Code and legal framework ==
ELECAM operates under the Cameroonian Electoral Code, Law No. 2012/001 of 19 April 2012, as amended. The code defines ELECAM’s powers, the electoral calendar, candidate eligibility, and dispute resolution procedures. Section 123 of the code governs the submission and scrutiny of presidential candidacy files by the Electoral Board.

== Voter registration process ==
Voter registration in Cameroon is continuous and conducted annually through biometric kits. ELECAM’s Directorate General of Elections manages the national voter register, issues voter cards, and conducts periodic revisions. Mobile registration teams are deployed to reach rural areas, military barracks, and Cameroonian diaspora communities. The 2026 revision of electoral registers ran from January to 31 August 2026.

== International partnerships ==
ELECAM collaborates with international organizations to strengthen electoral integrity. In May 2025, it signed a technical assistance agreement with the United Nations system for the 2025–2027 electoral cycle. The partnership includes training for electoral staff, workshops on gender inclusion with UN Women, and multi-stakeholder dialogue platforms. ELECAM also participates in activities with the Organisation Internationale de la Francophonie to promote inclusive elections.

== Criticism and controversies ==
ELECAM has faced criticism over its perceived lack of independence and transparency. Opposition parties and civil society groups have accused the commission of favoring the ruling Cameroon People’s Democratic Movement (CPDM). The exclusion of key opposition candidates from the 2025 presidential ballot drew condemnation from Human Rights Watch and other observers. ELECAM maintains that all decisions are based on the Electoral Code and has repeatedly stated its institutional independence.

== See also ==
- Politics of Cameroon
- Elections in Cameroon
- Constitutional Council of Cameroon
