= 1992 Cameroonian presidential election =

Second re-election of Paul Biya

- 11 October 1992
- Registered: 4,195,687
- Turnout: 71.87% (▼20.69pp)
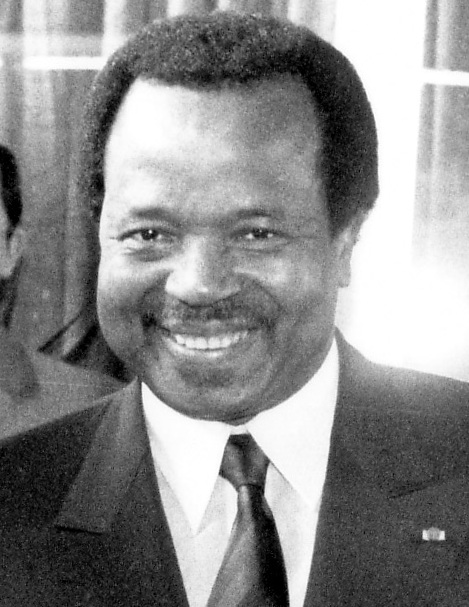

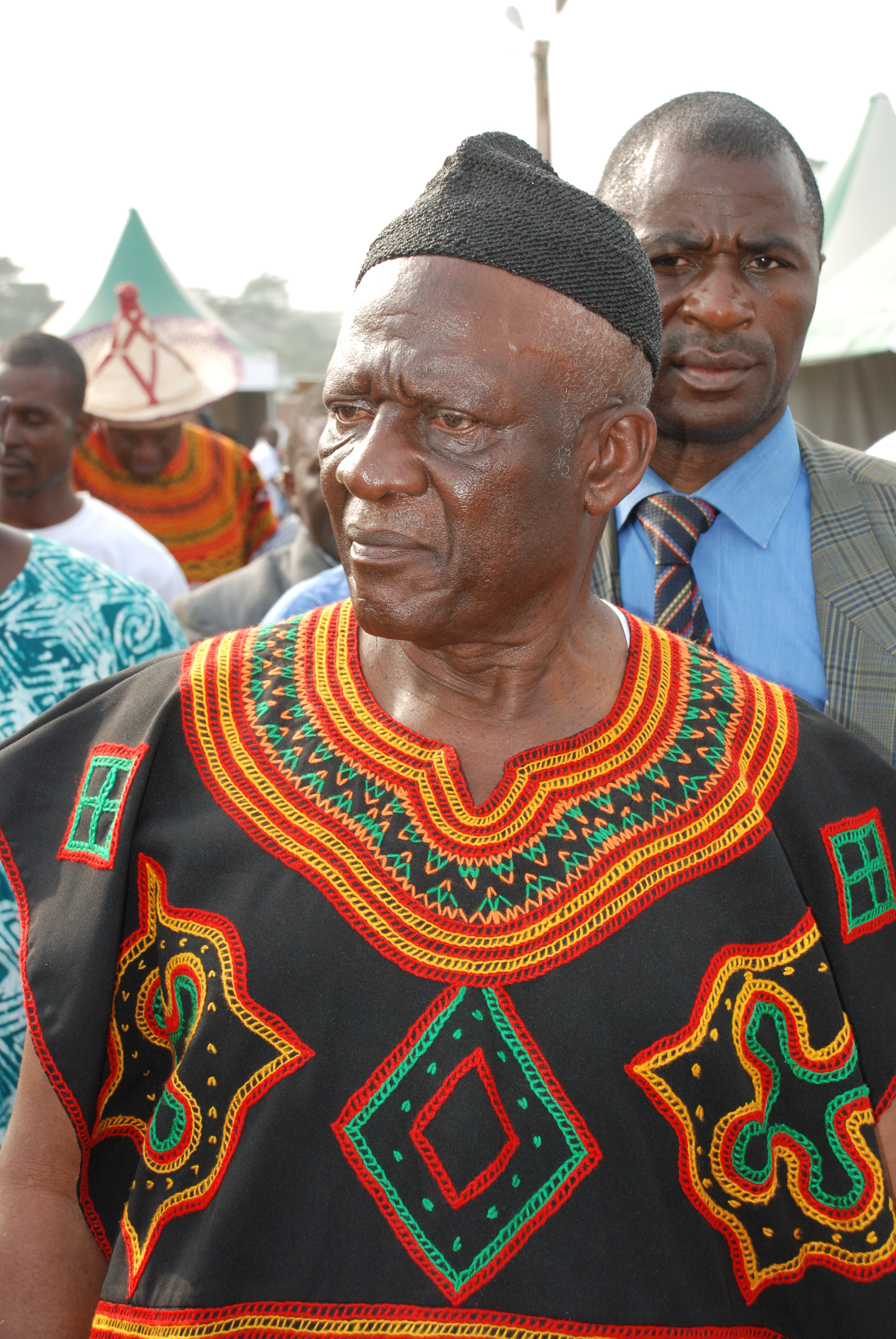

Nominee	Paul Biya	John Fru Ndi	Bello Bouba Maigari
Party	RDPC	SDF	UNDP
Popular vote	1,185,466	1,066,602	569,887
Percentage	39.98%	35.97%	19.22%
- Results by province Biya: 40-50% 60–70% 70–80% >90% Ndi: 50-60% 60–70% 80–90% Maigari: 50-60% 60-70%
President before election
Paul Biya
RDPC
Elected President
Paul Biya
RDPC

Presidential elections were held in Cameroon on 11 October 1992. They were the first multi-party presidential election since multi-party politics had been legalised. They were also the first to feature more than one candidate. Incumbent Paul Biya won with 40% of the vote. Voter turnout was 72%.

The SDF accused the incumbent government of election fraud. International election monitors questioned the validity of the results.

== Background ==
The 1992 presidential elections were a crucial moment in Cameroon's post-independence history. Although an assortment of opposition leaders—most importantly the anglophone Social Democratic Front leader John Fru Ndi—furiously opposed President Biya and sought to unseat him between 1990 and 1992, they were ultimately unable to do so. Although opposition was successful in forcing Biya to accept multi-party politics and severely pressured his regime, he nevertheless retained control of the country and faced a divided opposition in the 1992 elections. The opposition's failure to present a single candidate offered a significant advantage to Biya, as the electoral law did not provide for a second round, and therefore the opposition candidates could not unite against Biya in the event he failed to win a majority.

== Results ==
Official results showed Biya winning the election with 40% of the vote, while Fru Ndi trailed with 36%. The results were denounced as fraudulent by the opposition, and Fru Ndi claimed victory, but his claim proved fruitless.

Candidate	Party	Votes	%
Paul Biya	Cameroon People's Democratic Movement	1,185,466	39.98
John Fru Ndi	Social Democratic Front	1,066,602	35.97
Bello Bouba Maigari	National Union for Democracy and Progress	569,887	19.22
Adamou Ndam Njoya	Cameroon Democratic Union	107,411	3.62
Jean-Jacques Ekindi	Progressive Movement	23,525	0.79
Emah Otu	Grouping of Patriotic Forces	12,545	0.42
Total		2,965,436	100.00
Valid votes		2,965,436	98.34
Invalid/blank votes		50,012	1.66
Total votes		3,015,448	100.00
Registered voters/turnout		4,195,687	71.87
Source: Nohlen et al.
