= 1997 Cameroonian presidential election =

Third re-election of Paul Biya

- 12 October 1997
- Registered: 4,220,136
- Turnout: 83.10% (▲11.23pp)
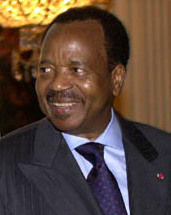

Nominee	Paul Biya	Henri Hogbe Nlend
Party	RDPC	UPC
Popular vote	3,167,820	85,693
Percentage	92.57%	2.50%
President before election
Paul Biya
RDPC
Elected President
Paul Biya
RDPC

Presidential elections were held in Cameroon on 12 October 1997. They were boycotted by the main opposition parties, the Social Democratic Front, the National Union for Democracy and Progress, and the Cameroon Democratic Union, as well as the smaller African Peoples Union. As a result, incumbent President Paul Biya was re-elected with 93% of the vote. Voter turnout was 83%.

== Results ==
Candidate	Party	Votes	%
Paul Biya	Cameroon People's Democratic Movement	3,167,820	92.57
Henri Hogbe Nlend	Union of the Peoples of Cameroon	85,693	2.50
Samuel Eboua	Movement for the Defence of the Republic	83,506	2.44
Albert Dzongang	Popular Party for Development	40,814	1.19
Joachim Tabi Owono	Action for Meritocracy and Equal Opportunities	15,817	0.46
Antoine N'Demannu	Rally of Peoples without Borders	15,490	0.45
Gustave Essaka	Cameroon Integral Democracy	12,915	0.38
Total		3,422,055	100.00
Valid votes		3,422,055	97.58
Invalid/blank votes		84,890	2.42
Total votes		3,506,945	100.00
Registered voters/turnout		4,220,136	83.10
Source: Nohlen et al.
