= Social Democratic Front (Cameroon) =

Political party in Cameroon

Social Democratic Front Front social démocrate
- Abbreviation: SDF
- President: Joshua Osih
- Founder: Ni John Fru Ndi
- Founded: 26 May 1990; 36 years ago
- Headquarters: Bamenda, Cameroon (de jure); Yaoundé, Cameroon (de facto)
- Youth wing: Social Democratic Front Youth
- Ideology: Social democracy Federalism; Anglophone interests
- Political position: Centre-left
- International affiliation: Socialist International; Progressive Alliance
- Colors: Green
- Slogan: Demócratie, Justice, Dévéloppement ("Democracy, Justice, Development")
- Senate: 1 / 100
- National Assembly: 5 / 180

Party flag
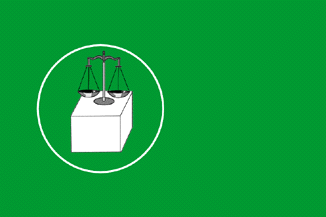

Website
- www.sdfcameroon.org

The Social Democratic Front (SDF; French: Front social démocrate) is the main opposition party of Cameroon. It was led by Ni John Fru Ndi from its foundation until his death in 2023, and receives significant support from the Anglophone Southwest and Northwest Regions.

== History ==
The SDF was launched in Bamenda on May 26, 1990 in opposition to the ruling Cameroon People's Democratic Movement; following the launching rally, six people were killed by security forces. The party held its Constitutive Assembly on February 3, 1991 and elected its National Executive Committee. The party refused to sign the Tripartite Declaration of November 1991, and it chose to boycott the March 1992 parliamentary election, along with the Democratic Union of Cameroon, due to the government's failure to meet opposition demands, which included the establishment of an independent electoral commission to oversee the election. However, the party announced at its May 1992 national convention that it would take part in the presidential election later that year. Fru Ndi, the SDF candidate in the October 1992 presidential election, received about 36% of the vote against about 40% for incumbent President Paul Biya, according to official results. The SDF believes he was denied victory "at gunpoint". He has now been largely criticized in the national press for moving residence to Yaoundé.

The SDF won 43 seats in the National Assembly in the May 1997 parliamentary election, receiving its best results in Northwest Province, where it won 19 out of 20 seats; it also won a majority of seats in West Province, with 15 out of 25. It chose to boycott the October 1997 presidential election, along with the National Union for Democracy and Progress (UNDP) and the Cameroon Democratic Union (UDC). In the June 2002 parliamentary election, the SDF won 22 seats; it won one of these seats in a revote held for some constituencies on 15 September. Although the party lost nearly half its seats in the 2002 election, it still dominated in Northwest Province, where it again won 19 out of 20 seats.

In the presidential election held on 11 October 2004, Fru Ndi stood again as the SDF candidate and won 17.4% of the vote according to official results, far behind Biya. In the July 2007 parliamentary election, the SDF won 14 out of the 163 initially declared seats, and it won a further two seats (out of 17 at stake) in constituencies where the election was held over again in September, thus winning a total of 16 out of 180 seats. These additional seats were crucial, because the SDF could not form a parliamentary group unless it had at least 15 seats. The party's electoral success remained largely confined to the Northwest Province, where it again won a majority of seats, with 11 out of 20.

The SDF strongly opposed a constitutional amendment allowing Biya to run for president again in 2011. Its deputies boycotted the April 2008 parliamentary vote in which the amendment was approved, and it subsequently called for a "day of mourning" in which people were to wear black and stay home.

One key alliance is between the SDF and the female Takembeng mobilizations. These women provide protection for SDF officials and a key presence at SDF demonstrations.

== International affiliation ==
The party is a full member of the Socialist International and Progressive Alliance.

== Election results ==
=== Presidential Elections ===
Election	Party candidate	Votes	%	Result
1992	John Fru Ndi	1,066,602	36.0%	Lost ✗
1997	Boycotted			
2004	John Fru Ndi	654,066	17.40%	Lost ✗
2011	John Fru Ndi	518,175	10.71%	Lost ✗
2018	Joshua Osih	118,706	3.36%	Lost ✗
2025	Joshua Osih	55,841	1.21%	Lost ✗

=== National Assembly elections ===
Election	Party leader	Votes	%	Seats	+/–	Position	Outcome
1992	John Fru Ndi	Boycotted		0 / 180			Extra-parliamentary
1997	John Fru Ndi	685,689	23.5%	43 / 180	▲43	▲2nd	Opposition
2002	John Fru Ndi			22 / 180	▼21	2nd	Opposition
2007	John Fru Ndi	425,435	13.6%	16 / 180	▼6	2nd	Opposition
2013	John Fru Ndi	508,901	12.6%	18 / 180	▲2	2nd	Opposition
2020	John Fru Ndi			5 / 180	▼13	▼3rd	Opposition
