= Alliance for Democracy and Development (Cameroon) =

Political party in Cameroon

The Alliance for Democracy and Development (French: Alliance pour la Démocratie et le Développement) is a political party in Cameroon. At the presidential elections, 11 October 2004, its candidate, Garga Haman Adji, won 3.7% of the vote.

Originally called the Alliance for Democracy and Progress, it was legally recognized on 4 June 1991.
