= John Fru Ndi =

Cameroonian politician (1941–2023)

Ni John Fru Ndi
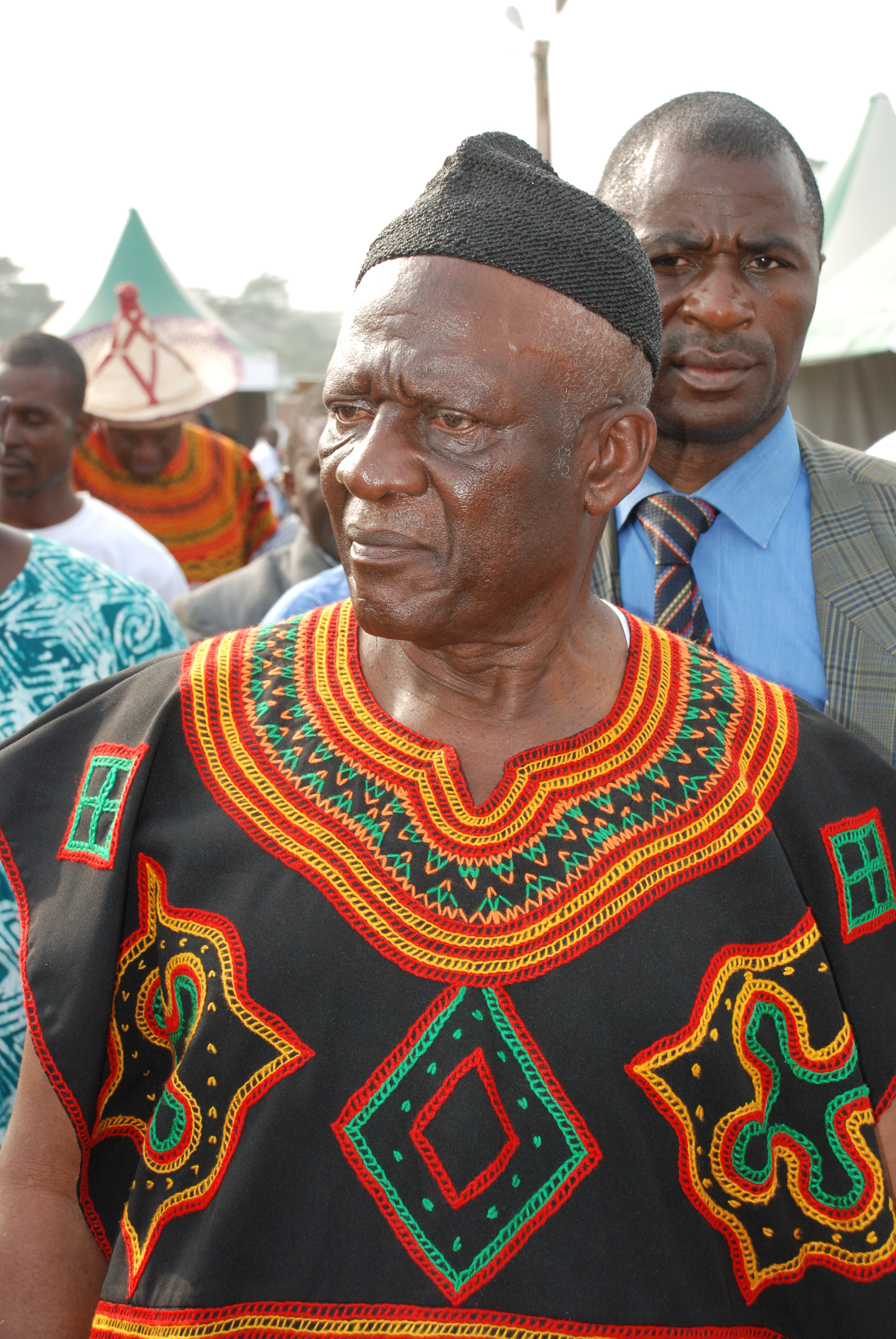
- Fru Ndi in 2011

Chairman of the Social Democratic Front
- In office 13 May 1990 – 12 June 2023
- Preceded by: Party established
- Succeeded by: Joshua Osih

Personal details
- Born: 7 July 1941 Baba II, British Cameroon
- Died: 12 June 2023 (aged 81) Yaoundé, Cameroon
- Party: Social Democratic Front
- Spouses: Susan Ndi (died 1973); Rose Ndi (died 2004)

Ni John Fru Ndi (7 July 1941 – 12 June 2023) was a Cameroonian politician who served as first and founding Chairman of the Social Democratic Front (SDF), the main opposition party in Cameroon, from party foundation in 1990 to his death in 2023. He failed to be elected as a senator in 2013.

== Early life and education ==
Fru Ndi was born in Baba II, near Bamenda in the Northwest Province of Cameroon. The title of Ni (a mark of respect) was given to him when he was born.

Fru Ndi attended school in Cameroon at the Baforchu Basel Mission and the Santa Native Authority before going to Nigeria to study (at Lagos City College) and work in 1957.

== Work before politics ==
In 1966, Fru Ndi returned to Cameroon and began selling vegetables.

Fru Ndi ran a bookstore in Bamenda, the Ebibi Book Centre, headed a football club from 1979 to 1988, and headed the Lions Club International branch in Bamenda from 1987 to 1988.

== Political career ==
Fru Ndi was a candidate of the ruling Cameroon People's Democratic Movement (RDPC) in the Mezam Central constituency during the single-party 1988 parliamentary election, losing to a different RDPC list.

Fru Ndi was the founder of the SDF, an opposition party, in 1990. He was elected as the SDF's National Chairman at its First Ordinary National Convention, held in Bamenda in May 1992. After that, he was popularly known as "The Chairman". He campaigned for the rights of the English-speaking minority in the mostly French-speaking country, but wanted a federal, unified nation.

In the October 1992 presidential election, he made a strong showing against President Paul Biya, losing with 36% of the vote against Biya's 40% according to official results (in Fru Ndi's stronghold, Northwest Province, he officially won 86.3%). This election was condemned as fraudulent by the opposition, and Fru Ndi and third place opposition candidate Maigari Bello Bouba unsuccessfully sought for the election to be annulled by the Supreme Court. Amidst the outbreak of violence in the North-West Province that followed the election, Fru Ndi was placed under house arrest in late October 1992. After about a month, he was released. On 20 January 1993, Fru Ndi, along with his wife Rose, attended the inauguration of United States President Bill Clinton. He and Rose were photographed with Clinton and Clinton's wife Hillary, and Fru Ndi's presence at the event had a symbolic impact in Cameroon, giving the impression of recognition and legitimacy in light of Fru Ndi's claim to have won the 1992 election.

Along with other opposition parties, the SDF chose to boycott the October 1997 presidential election. Fru Ndi was re-elected as SDF Chairman at the party's fifth congress in April 1999, receiving 1,561 votes from delegates against 40 for his challenger, Chretien Tabetsing.

Fru Ndi was the SDF candidate in the October 2004 presidential election; according to official results, he took second place with 17.40% of the vote against 70.92% for Biya. He received his best results in Northwest Province (68.16%), followed by West Province (45.04%), Littoral Province (32.71%), and Southwest Province (30.59%).

Fru Ndi alleged fraud in the July 2007 parliamentary election and called for it to be annulled; in the election, the SDF won the second highest number of seats but was far behind the ruling RDPC, which won an overwhelming majority of seats. After the election, Fru Ndi said that Biya should recognize him as the official leader of the opposition.

Fru Ndi said on 14 November 2007 that he would be willing to meet with Biya. He said that Biya had not invited him to meet and that he had tried to meet Biya several times, contradicting Biya's statement on French television that Fru Ndi had not responded to his invitation.

On 12 April 2008, Fru Ndi called for a national day of mourning on 21 April 2008 to commemorate the individuals who died during the 2008 anti-government protests and the "death of democracy" in Cameroon. Fru Ndi indicated that he believed the 2008 changes to the Constitution were intended to enable President Biya to be lifelong dictator of Cameroon and that the changes would institutionalize corruption, immunity, and inertia.

Fru Ndi again stood unsuccessfully as a candidate in the October 2011 presidential election, placing a distant second behind Biya. A few days after the election, on 17 October 2011, Fru Ndi, alongside other presidential candidates, called an emergency meeting to demand that Biya annul the election.

In the April 2013 Senate election, Fru Ndi stood as a candidate in the Northwest Province, his primary support base. The indirect election marked the creation of the upper house of Parliament; previously only the National Assembly had existed. Fru Ndi failed to win a seat in the Senate. He alleged that the ruling party had bribed some SDF local councilors.

Fru Ndi took a critical stance against the Cameroonian government's handling of the Anglophone Crisis, a war that affected him personally. In October 2018, Ambazonian separatists burned down his house in Bamenda. On 19 April 2019, his brother was kidnapped by gunmen, who demanded a ransom. Eight days later he was kidnapped himself, while visiting Kumbo, Northwest Region to attend the funeral of Joseph Banadzem, the Parliamentary group leader of the SDF. He was released shortly afterwards, with the SDF describing the whole affair as a "misunderstanding" that was quickly solved. It was revealed the next day that the separatists had kidnapped Fru Ndi in order to get a chance to talk to him. In a video that appeared online, gunmen asked the SDF leader to withdraw all SDF legislators from the National Assembly and the senate. Fru Ndi replied that he would not, stating that doing so would be counterproductive.

In June 2019, Fru Ndi stated that while he was not a separatist, the government "was pushing him" in that direction. Fru Ndi made a point of always travelling without a security escort whenever he visited the Anglophone regions, stating that he was not afraid of his own people – including separatists.

== Personal life and death ==
Fru Ndi's first wife, Susan, died after giving birth in 1973. His second wife, Rose, to whom he was married for over 25 years, died in 2004. They had had several children. After her death he established a charitable foundation in her name.

Fru Ndi died at his home in Yaoundé, on 12 June 2023, at the age of 81. An obituary by BBC News called him a "brave champion of democracy".
