= President of Cameroon =

Head of state

President of the Republic of Cameroon
- Président de la République du Cameroun (French)
- Coat of arms of Cameroon

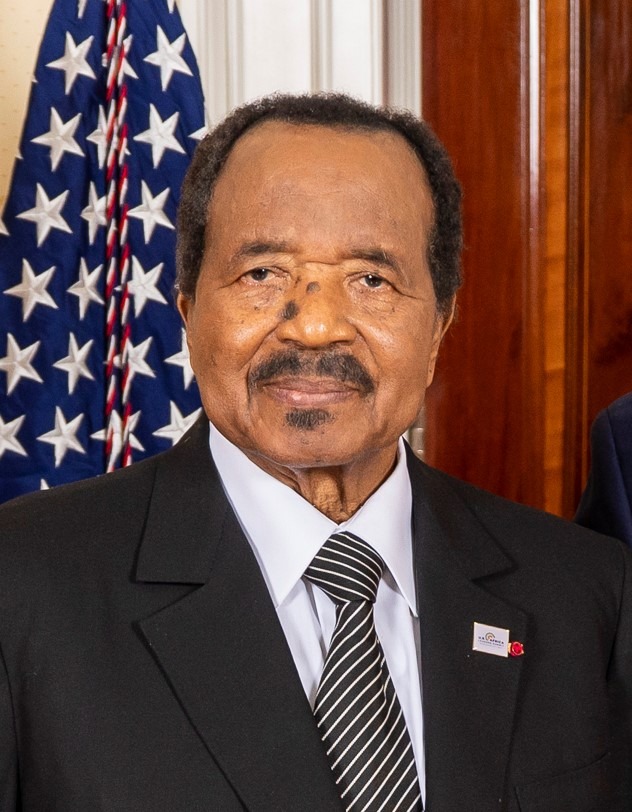
- Incumbent; Paul Biya since 6 November 1982
- Style: Excellency
- Residence: Unity Palace, Yaoundé
- Appointer: Elected
- Term length: Seven years Renewable
- Constituting instrument: Constitution of Cameroon (1972)
- Inaugural holder: Ahmadou Ahidjo
- Formation: 5 May 1960; 66 years ago
- Deputy: Vice President (de jure); President of the Senate (de facto)
- Salary: 378,813,989 Central African CFA francs/620,976 USD (estimated) annually
- Website: www.prc.cm/en/

The President of Cameroon (French: Président de la République du Cameroun) is the executive head of state and de facto head of government of Cameroon and is the commander in chief of the Cameroon Armed Forces. The authority of the state is exercised both by the president and by the Parliament.

== History ==
The office of president of Cameroon was established in 1960, following the country's independence from France. Only two people have held the office of president—Ahmadou Ahidjo, who served from 1960 to 1982, and Paul Biya, who has served since Ahidjo's resignation in 1982.

== Term limits ==
Term limits for the president were lifted for Biya in 2008.

== Latest election ==
Candidate	Party	Votes	%
Paul Biya	Cameroon People's Democratic Movement	2,474,179	53.66
Issa Tchiroma	Cameroon National Salvation Front	1,622,334	35.19
Cabral Libii	Cameroonian Party for National Reconciliation	157,568	3.42
Bello Bouba Maigari	National Union for Democracy and Progress	112,758	2.45
Patricia Ndam Njoya	Cameroon Democratic Union	76,721	1.66
Joshua Osih	Social Democratic Front	55,841	1.21
Seta Caxton Ateki	Liberal Alliance Party	39,935	0.87
Hiram Samuel Iyodi	Front of Cameroonian Democrats	18,828	0.41
Serge Espoir Matomba	United People for Social Renovation	15,925	0.35
Jacques Bouhga-Hagbe	Cameroonian National Citizen Movement	13,612	0.30
Pierre Kwemo	Union of Socialist Movements	12,873	0.28
Akere Muna	Univers	10,252	0.22
Total		4,610,826	100.00
Valid votes		4,610,826	98.77
Invalid/blank votes		57,620	1.23
Total votes		4,668,446	100.00
Registered voters/turnout		8,082,692	57.76
Source: Constitutional Council

== See also ==
- Politics of Cameroon
- Vice President of Cameroon
