= 2026 Cameroonian parliamentary election =

- by 20 December 2026
- All 180 seats in the National Assembly; 91 seats needed for a majority
Party	Leader	Current seats
RDPC	Paul Biya	149
UNDP	Bello Bouba Maigari	7
SDF	Joshua Osih	6
CPNC	Cabral Libii	5
UDC	Patricia Tomaïno Ndam Njoya	4
FSNC	Issa Tchiroma	3
MDR	vacant	2
UMS	Pierre Kwemo	2
Incumbent Prime Minister
Joseph Ngute; RDPC

Parliamentary elections will be held in Cameroon in 2026. Originally, the elections were planned for 2025, however President Paul Biya extended the term of the National Assembly by one year, until 30 March 2026. However, on 10 February 2026, president Biya announced a "slight readjustment" of the election date due to "certain compelling constraints", without providing a new date. On 19 March 2026, the National Assembly voted to extend its mandate until 20 December 2026.

== Electoral system ==
The 180 members of the National Assembly are elected from 58 single- and multi-member constituencies based on the departments. In single-member constituencies, first-past-the-post voting is used. In multi-member constituencies, a modified form of closed list proportional representation is used, in which a party receiving over 50% of the vote in a constituency wins all the seats, but if no party receives over 50% of the vote, the party with the most votes is awarded half the seats and any other party receiving over 5% of the vote receives a proportional share of the remaining half of the seats based on the largest remainder method and Hare quota.
