= Politics of Cameroon =

The politics of Cameroon takes place in the context of an electoral autocracy where multi-party elections have been held since 1992, the ruling party wins every election, and Paul Biya has been president since 1982. Since Cameroon's independence in 1960, it has been a single-party state and ruled only by two presidents: Ahmadou Ahidjo and Paul Biya. Legislative power belongs to the Senate and the National Assembly of Cameroon, the lower house of Parliament and the Senate the upper house. Political opposition is repressed, and elections are manipulated in favor of the ruling party.

Nominally, it is a unitary presidential republic, whereby the President of Cameroon is both head of state and head of government, and of a multi-party system. A prime ministerial position exists and is nominally head of government, implying a semi-presidential system, although de facto the prime minister only serves to assist the president. Executive power is exercised by the government. Legislative power is vested in both the government and the National Assembly of Cameroon.

== Political background ==
The government adopted legislation in 1997 to authorize the formation of multiple political parties and ease restrictions on forming civil associations and private newspapers. Cameroon's first multiparty legislative and presidential elections were held in 1992, followed by municipal elections in 1996 and another round of legislative and presidential elections in 1997. Because the government refused to consider opposition demands for an independent election commission, the three major opposition parties boycotted the October 1997 presidential election, which Biya easily won. The leader of one of the opposition parties, Bello Bouba Maigari of the NUDP, subsequently joined the government.

Cameroon has a number of independent newspapers. Censorship was abolished in 1996, but the government sometimes seizes or suspends newspapers and occasionally arrests journalists. Although a 1990 law authorizes private radio and television stations, the government has not granted any licenses as of March 1998.

The Cameroonian Government's human rights record has been improving over the years but remains flawed. There continue to be reported abuses, including beatings of detainees, arbitrary arrests, and illegal searches. The judiciary is frequently corrupt, inefficient, and subject to political influence.

Worthy of note is the fact that Cameroon is the only country in which two Constitutions are applicable side by side. For example, the 1972 Constitution designates the prime minister as constitutional successor of the head of state in case of incapacity, death, resignation or unaccountable absence of the incumbent. Contrarily, the 1996 Constitutional Reform designates the president of the Senate as constitutional successor; but the Senate (provided for by 1996 Reform) does not exist. Apart from increasing the presidential mandate from 5 years to 7 years, very few amendments of the 1996 Constitutional Reform have been applied.

== Executive branch ==
Main office-holders
Office	Name	Party	Since
President	Paul Biya	Cameroon People's Democratic Movement	6 November 1982
Prime Minister	Joseph Dion Ngute	Cameroon People's Democratic Movement	4 January 2019

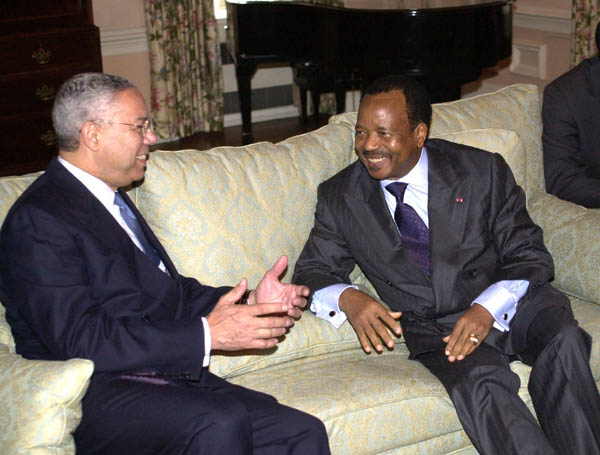
Cameroon President Paul Biya (right) with Colin Powell

The 1972 constitution of the Republic of Cameroon as modified by 1996 reforms provides for a strong central government dominated by the executive. The president is empowered to name and dismiss cabinet members (regardless of parliamentary representation), judges, generals, provincial governors, prefects, sub-prefects, and heads of Cameroon's parastatal (about 100 state-controlled) firms, obligate or disburse expenditures, approve or veto regulations, declare states of emergency, and appropriate and spend profits of parastatal firms. The president is not required to consult the National Assembly. In 2008, a constitutional amendment was passed that eliminated term limits for president.

The judiciary is subordinate to the executive branch's Ministry of Justice. The Supreme court may review the constitutionality of a law only at the president's request.

All local government officials are employees of the central government's Ministry of Territorial Administration, from which local governments also get most of their budgets.

While the president, the minister of justice, and the president's judicial advisers (the Supreme Court) top the judicial hierarchy, traditional rulers, courts, and councils also exercise functions of government. Traditional courts still play a major role in domestic, property, and probate law. Tribal laws and customs are honored in the formal court system when not in conflict with national law. Traditional rulers receive stipends from the national government.

== Legislative branch ==
The 180-member National Assembly meets in ordinary session three times a year (March/April, June/July, and November/December), and has seldom, until recently, made major changes in legislation proposed by the executive. Laws are adopted by majority vote of members present or, if the president demands a second reading, of a total membership.

Following government pledges to reform the strongly centralized 1972 constitution, the National Assembly adopted a number of amendments in December 1995 which were promulgated in January 1996. The amendments call for the establishment of a 100-member senate as part of a bicameral legislature, the creation of regional councils, and the fixing of the presidential term to 7 years, renewable once. One-third of senators are to be appointed by the president, and the remaining two-thirds are to be chosen by indirect elections. The government has established the Senate in 2013.

== Political parties and elections ==
In the late 1960s, political parties were unified within the Cameroon National Union. In 1985, this single party became the Cameroon People's Democratic Movement, which had 153 members of parliament in 2007. In 1991, multiparty politics was introduced.

Officially, as of décembre 2023, 369 political parties have been legalized in Cameroon.

Following the legislative elections of February 9, 2020 , the Cameroonian political system is dominated by the ruling party, the CPDM, which holds 152 seats. The Social Democratic Front, led by Joshua Osih, has 13 seats in 2022; the Cameroon Democratic Union, led by Hermine Patricia Tomaïno Ndam Njoya, has 4 seats; the National Union for Democracy and Progress (Cameroon), led by Bello Bouba Maigari, has 7 seats; Cameroonian Party for National Reconciliation, led by Cabral Libii, has 5 seats; the Cameroon National Salvation Front, led by Issa Tchiroma Bakary, has 3 seats; the Movement for the Defence of the Republic, led by Paulin Djorwé, has 2 seats; and the Union of Socialist Movements, led by Pierre Kwemo, has 2 seats. These are the opposition parties represented in the National Assembly.

== Judicial branch ==
The judiciary is subordinate to the executive branch's Ministry of Justice. The Supreme Court may review the constitutionality of a law only at the president's request.

== The role of women ==
In an article on the construction of a ‘model Cameroonian woman’ in the Cameroonian parliament, Lilian Atanga, examines arguments used to perpetuate a popular ideal and discourses which "sustain and maintain the status quo (e.g. of women as domestic or women as cooks)".

== International organization participation ==
Cameroon is member of the following organizations:

- Agence de Coopération Culturelle et Technique (ACCT)
- ACP (Lomé Convention) (ACP)
- African Development Bank (AfDB)
- Development Bank of the Central African States (BDEAC)
- Commonwealth of Nations (C)
- Economic Community of Central African States (CEEAC)
- United Nations Economic Commission for Africa (ECA)
- Food and Agriculture Organization (FAO)
- Franc zone (FZ)
- Group of 77 (G-77)
- International Atomic Energy Agency (IAEA)
- International Bank for Reconstruction and Development (IBRD)
- International Civil Aviation Organization (ICAO)
- International Criminal Court (ICC)
- International Red Cross and Red Crescent Movement (ICRM)
- International Development Association (IDA)
- Islamic Development Bank (IDB)
- International Fund for Agricultural Development (IFAD)
- International Finance Corporation (IFC)
- International Red Cross and Red Crescent Movement (IFRCS)
- International Labour Organization (ILO)
- International Monetary Fund (IMF)
- International Maritime Organization (IMO)
- International Mobile Satellite Organization (IMSO)
- Intelsat
- Interpol (organization) (Interpol)
- International Olympic Committee (IOC)
- International Telecommunication Union (ITU)
- International Trade Union Confederation (ITUC)
- Non-Aligned Movement (NAM)
- Organisation of African Unity (OAU)
- Organisation of Islamic Cooperation (OIC)
- Organisation for the Prohibition of Chemical Weapons (OPCW)
- Permanent Court of Arbitration (PCA)
- Customs and Economic Union of Central Africa (CMEAC)
- United Nations (UN)
- United Nations Conference on Trade and Development (UNCTAD)
- United Nations Educational, Scientific and Cultural Organization (UNESCO)
- United Nations Industrial Development Organization (UNIDO)
- United Nations Institute for Training and Research (UNITAR)
- Universal Postal Union (UPU)
- World Customs Organization (WCO)
- World Federation of Trade Unions (WFTU)
- World Health Organization (WHO)
- World Intellectual Property Organization (WIPO)
- World Meteorological Organization (WMO)
- World Tourism Organization (WToO)
- World Trade Organization (WTrO)

== See also ==
- Cameroon public administration structure
- List of governments of Cameroon
