= Chris Manengs =

Cameroon political strategist and filmmaker

- Other name: Chrislan Manengs
- Occupations: Political strategist, entrepreneur, filmmaker
- Organization(s): MMI Business Solutions; CliqKey AB
- Known for: Campaign manager for Issa Tchiroma Bakary (2025)
- Political party: Front for the National Salvation of Cameroon (FSNC)

Chris Manengs (also known as Chrislan Manengs) is a Cameroonian political strategist, entrepreneur, and filmmaker. He served as campaign manager and director of communication for Issa Tchiroma Bakary during the 2025 Cameroonian presidential election.

== Career ==
Manengs holds a Doctorate in Business Administration with a specialisation in international business and strategic management. He founded MMI Business Solutions, a consulting firm headquartered in the United States with an African branch in Cameroon, and CliqKey AB, a technology platform registered in Sweden. In 2024, Agence Ecofin reported on his consulting work advising prominent executives and families in Cameroon, across Africa, and in the Gulf region on strategic communication and reputation management.

During the 2025 Cameroonian presidential election, Manengs served as sole spokesperson and campaign director for Tchiroma Bakary after Tchiroma revoked other spokesperson mandates and named him the only authorised representative. Coverage of the campaign also situated him within the core team coordinating Tchiroma's outreach in Cameroon and the broader Central Africa region.

Manengs signed a communiqué issued by the Front for the National Salvation of Cameroon (FSNC) after a visit by Tchiroma to opposition leader Maurice Kamto to discuss a united front ahead of the 2025 vote. Broader reporting on Tchiroma's designation as a consensual opposition candidate in the 2025 Cameroonian presidential election places Manengs within the wider campaign‑team structure, even when he is not named directly.

Following the disputed election results, Manengs was exfiltrated from Cameroon to Europe with the assistance of several Western diplomatic missions, according to reporting by Jeune Afrique and CamerounWeb. After the Front for the National Salvation of Cameroon (FSNC) announced a boycott of upcoming legislative elections in Cameroon and municipal elections in Cameroon, Manengs warned that the absence of Tchiroma's supporters could be "néfaste" and called for a separate platform for these voters.

In February 2026, Manengs gave a detailed interview on the programme The Conversation Desk on MMI News, in which he discussed what he described as tactical errors that prevented Tchiroma from accessing power despite claiming electoral victory. His comments sparked a public polemic with MRC vice-president Mamadou Mota, who accused him of being a "mercenaire" and a "menteur", while Manengs responded by claiming responsibility for the strategic architecture of the Tchiroma campaign.

Manengs is the creator of the Cameroonian television series LIFE. He is the author of the book Excited Career Rollercoaster, published in 2016.
