= Elections in Cameroon =

Elections in Cameroon occur in a system of electoral autocracy, as the ruling party (which has been in power since independence in 1960) manipulates elections and represses political opposition.

Cameroon elects on a national level, a head of state – the president – and a legislature. The president is elected for a seven-year term by the people; a two-term limit on the office was removed through a parliamentary vote in April 2008. The National Assembly (Assemblée Nationale) has 180 members, elected for a five-year term in 49 single and multi-seat constituencies. Cameroon also has a Senate, with 100 elected officials, each serving 5 years. 70 of these are elected by a regional council, while 30 are elected directly from the president.

Cameroon is a one party dominant state with the Cameroon People's Democratic Movement in power. Opposition parties are allowed, but are widely considered to have no real chance of gaining power. Elections are manipulated in favor of the ruling party.

Independent candidates are barred from running in parliamentary and municipal elections. They are permitted to run in presidential elections, but there has never been an independent presidential candidate due to the very exacting legal requirements for an independent candidacy.

== Federal Elections ==
Since 1990, multiple parties have been able to run in federal elections, with 1992 being the first year of municipal elections. 1996 was then the first year of multiple parties running for the presidential office. Later down the line, The National Assembly worked to limit the amount of issues by passing a National Elections Observatory in 2000. The NEO works to supervise local and legislative elections across the country.

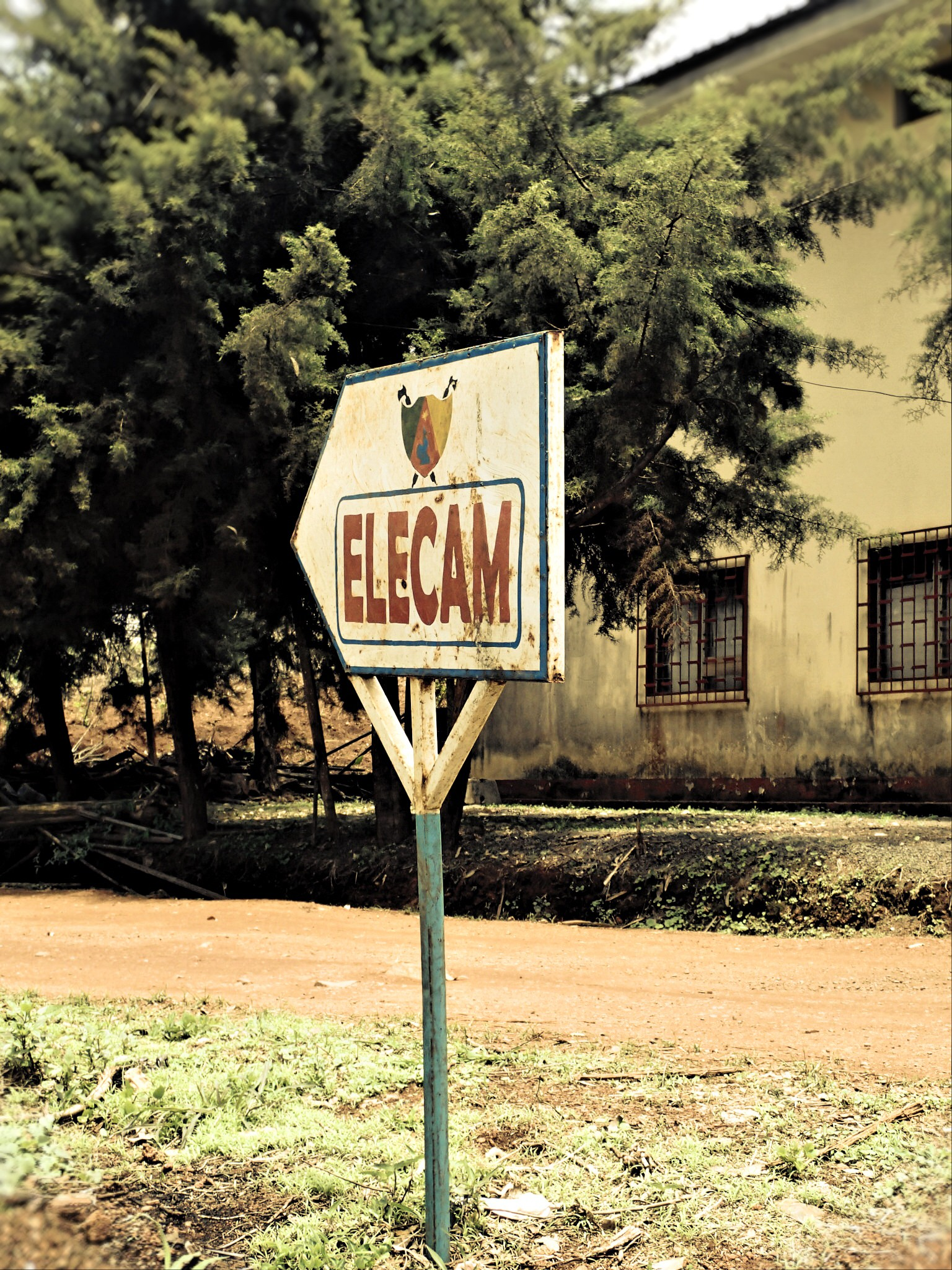
A picture of Cameroon's Election Commission.

As of 2009, people are able to be register to vote between January 1 and April 30 and must register to vote at that time to vote. There are registration offices located throughout the country.

== Eligibility to Run ==
=== Parliamentary Elections ===
There are numerous criteria to be able to run for Parliament such as being able read and write in French or English, be nominated or presented by a political party, be 23 years of age, being a Cameroonian born citizen, paying the Treasury to indicate a parliament run and not have been declared ineligible to run.

=== Presidential Elections ===
According to Article 8 of the Chapter 1 of the Cameroonian Constitution, those attempting a presidential bid must be at least 35 years of age and born in Cameroon. The person must than be able to show that they live in Cameroon as further prove as citizenship.

== Last elections ==
- 2020 Cameroonian municipal elections
- 2025 Cameroonian presidential election

== Next elections ==
- 2026 Cameroonian parliamentary election

== See also ==
- Electoral calendar
- Electoral system
- Freedom of Speech in Cameroon
