= Vice President of Cameroon =

Second-highest office in Cameroon

Vice President of the Republic of Cameroon
- Vice-président de la République du Cameroun (French)
- Coat of arms of Cameroon
- Incumbent; Vacant since 4 April 2026
- Style: Excellency
- Appointer: The President
- Term length: No fixed term
- Constituting instrument: Constitution of Cameroon
- Formation: 1 October 1961 (first); 4 April 2026 (second)
- First holder: John Ngu Foncha
- Abolished: 2 June 1972 (first)

The Vice President of Cameroon (French: Vice-président de la République du Cameroun) is the deputy of the president of Cameroon. The position existed from 1961 to 1972, when the country was a federation, and was abolished after a new constitution created a unitary system, before being re-established in 2026.

== Functions ==
The vice president can be appointed and dismissed by the president and may serve alongside the president until the end of their seven-year term. Upon a presidential vacancy, the vice president automatically assumes the office of president to serve the remainder of the president's term, but is barred from amending the constitution or running in the next presidential election.

== List of vice presidents ==
Two vice presidents served under the Federal Republic of Cameroon and are listed below.

Image	Name	Period	Party	President
	John Ngu Foncha (1916–1999)	1961–1970	KNDP (until 1966)	Ahmadou Ahidjo
	John Ngu Foncha (1916–1999)	1961–1970	CNU (from 1966)	Ahmadou Ahidjo
	Salomon Tandeng Muna (1912–2002)	1970–1972	CNU	Ahmadou Ahidjo

== See also ==
- President of Cameroon
- Prime Minister of Cameroon
- Politics of Cameroon
