= 2025 Cameroonian presidential election =

Seventh re-election of Paul Biya

- 12 October 2025
- Registered: 8,082,692
- Turnout: 57.76% (▲3.91 pp)
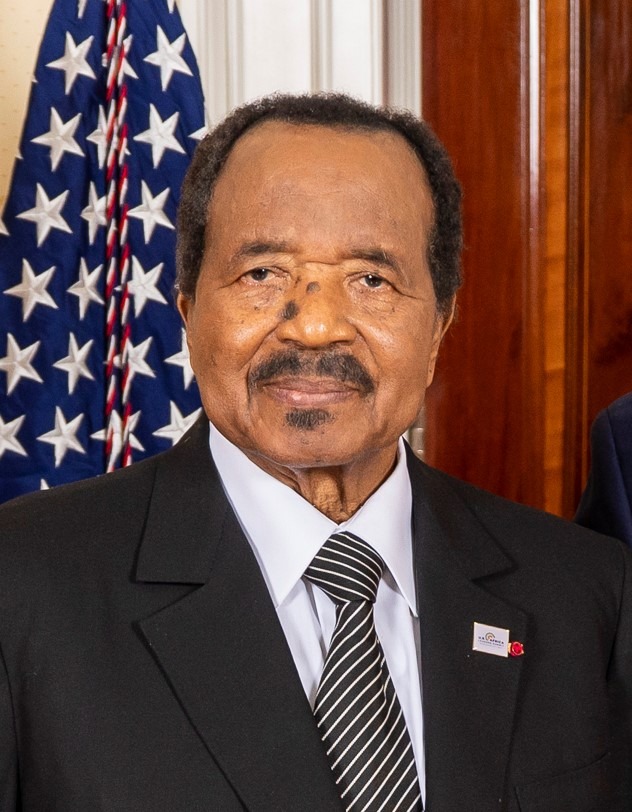

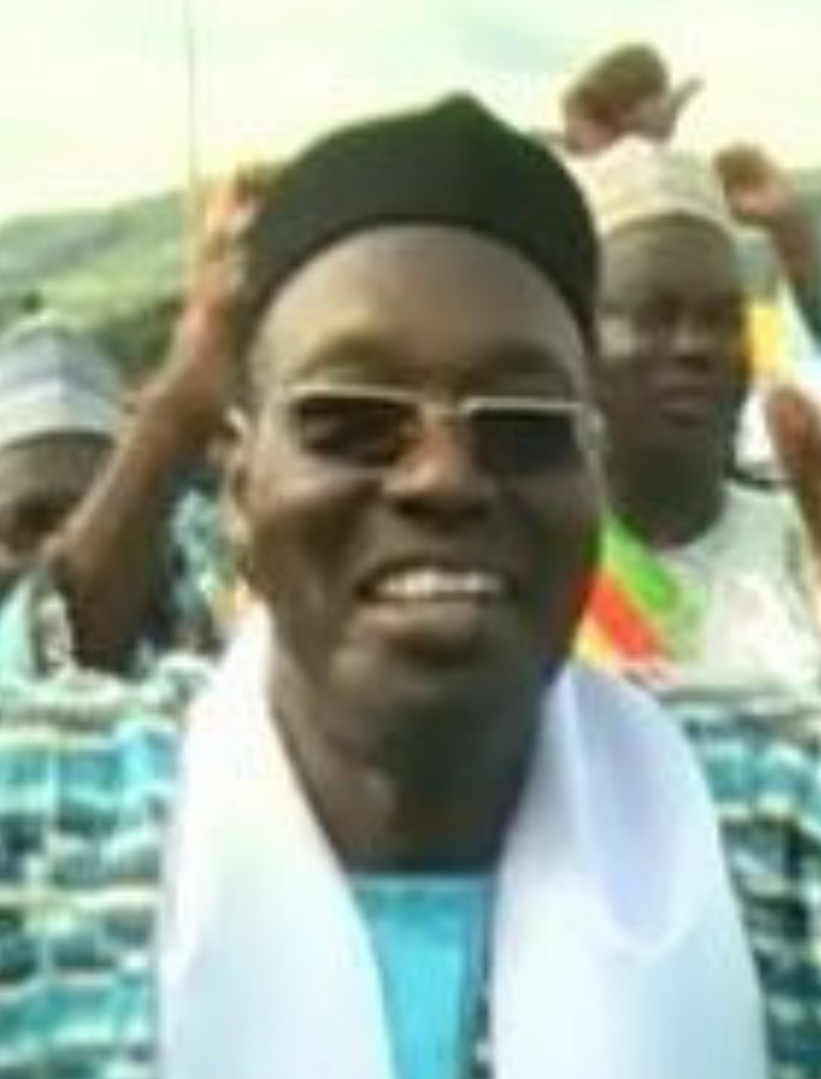
Candidate	Paul Biya	Issa Tchiroma
Party	RDPC	FSNC
Popular vote	2,474,179	1,622,334
Percentage	53.66%	35.19%
President before election
Paul Biya
RDPC
Elected President
Paul Biya
RDPC

Presidential elections were held in Cameroon on 12 October 2025.

The presidential election resulted in a victory for the incumbent president Paul Biya of the Cameroon People's Democratic Movement who according to official published results received 54% of the vote. Opposition candidate Issa Tchiroma of the Cameroon National Salvation Front finished second with 35% of the vote.

== Background ==
The previous presidential elections on 7 October 2018 saw incumbent president Paul Biya, who has ruled since 1982, elected for another seven-year term following a 2008 constitutional amendment that removed term limits, allowing Biya to run again. Biya's candidacy remained plausible, however, with his declaration of wanting to continue to serve the nation, reaffirming during his 7 October campaign speech in Maroua that he will "never resign...until significant progress has been achieved in this area." His candidacy for the 2025 presidential election caused controversy within the Cameroonian government, while a petition was filed by opposition candidate Akere Muna before the Constitutional Council seeking to disqualify Biya on grounds of the latter's advanced age, recurrent health absences, and presumed dependency on third parties.

== Electoral system ==
The President of Cameroon is elected by first-past-the-post voting; the candidate with the most votes is declared the winner with no requirement to achieve a majority. Registration for voting ended on 31 August 2024, with more than seven million people estimated to have signed up.

== Candidates ==
A total of 83 people registered their candidacy in the election, of which seven were women. On 26 July, Elections Cameroon (Elecam) released a provisional list of 13 candidates, with Hermine Patricia Tomaïno Ndam Njoya as the only female candidate. Thirty-five appeals were subsequently made by rejected candidates before the Constitutional Council. On 4 August, the Constitutional Council invalidated Hilaire Dzipan's candidacy, leaving 12 candidates on the race.

=== Approved ===
- Ateki Seta Caxton (PAL)
- Jacques Bougha-Hagbe (MCNC)
- Hiram Samuel Iyodi (FDC)
- Pierre Kwemo (UMS)
- Serge Espoir Matomba (PURS)
- Paul Biya (CPDM)
- Issa Tchiroma (FSNC)
- Hermine Patricia Tomaïno Ndam Njoya (UDC)
- Bello Bouba Maigari (UNDP)
- Joshua Osih (SDF)
- Akere Muna (UNIVERS)
- Cabral Libii (PCRN)

=== Declared ===
- Paul Biya, aged 92, incumbent president and candidate for the Cameroon People's Democratic Movement (RDPC). In June 2025, a municipal councilor from the town of Monatélé, Leon Theiller, contacted Élécam, the body responsible for elections, to have this probable candidacy declared illegal. Biya declared his candidacy on 13 July and registered through the RDPC's secretary-general, Jean Nkuete, on 17 July.
- Hermine Patricia Tomaïno Ndam Njoya (UDC), aged 56, is the president of the UDC. She announced her candidacy on 21 February 2025 during the press conference of the Cameroon Democratic Union (UDC), of which she is the president. She served as deputy to the National Assembly for Noun for 13 years from 2007–2020. Despite winning in 2020, Tomaïno gave up her seat as a deputy and chose to become municipal councillor and subsequently mayor of Foumban. She was elected Regional Councilor of the Western Region. She is the spokesperson for the Platform of Opposition Leaders for the Revision of the Electoral Code.
- Issa Tchiroma, aged 76–77 or 80 is a former railway engineer and candidate for the Front for the National Salvation of Cameroon. Tchiroma was formerly allied with President Biya and has served in multiple ministries in his government between 1992 and 2025, when Tchiroma broke ties with Biya and left the government to join the opposition.
- Bello Bouba Maigari, aged 78, is another former ally of President Biya. He served in a few ministries in Biya's administration and is currently the Minister of State, Tourism and Leisure. Maigari is a candidate for the National Union for Democracy and Progress. Unlike Tchiroma, Maigari remained in Biya's government.
- Akere Muna, aged 72, is an international lawyer and candidate for the Univers party. Akere is globally renowned especially in the areas of anti-corruption and good governance and previously a candidate for Now!.
- Joshua Osih, leader of the Social Democratic Front.
- Eric Essono Tsimi, aged 43, academic based in Chicago and a writer. He announced his "civil and civic" candidacy in May 2024 during an interview with journalist Jean-Bruno Tagne on Naja TV. His campaign was carried out under the platform Nous Sommes Le Changement / We Are the Change. Tsimi has also been engaged in negotiations with various political parties, including the FDC and the PAL.
- Cabral Libii, aged 45, is a journalist and law professor at University of Yaoundé II. He also served as a member of the National Assembly of Cameroon since 2020. He previously a candidate for the Univers. Libii was a head of Cameroon Party for National Reconciliation (PCRN).
- Léon Theiller Onana, aged 38, another member of the Cameroon People's Democratic Movement (CPDM) who declared his candidacy.

=== Disqualified ===
- Maurice Kamto, aged 71, is a retired academic and lawyer, representing the Cameroon Renaissance Movement (MRC). Kamto, who previously ran in the 2018 presidential election, is also supported by the Political Alliance for Reform (APC) and the Front for Change in Cameroon (FCC). Kamto filed his candidacy on 15 July, but was barred from running by the Elecam on 26 July after it said that the MRC, which boycotted legislative and municipal elections in 2020, was therefore ineligible to nominate a candidate.

== Campaign ==
On 18 September 2025, Paul Biya's daughter, Brenda Biya, published a video on social media calling on voters not to elect her father for president. She also accused her family of mistreating her. Brenda subsequently deleted the video and issued an apology.

Campaigning officially began on 27 September.

== Opinion polls ==
Pollster	Fieldwork date	Sample size	Margin of error	Maurice Kamto	Cabral Libii	Paul Biya	Akere Muna	Chris Fomunyoh	Joshua Osih	Abakar Ahamat	Others	Margin
EC4UC	13–20 June 2025	735	±3.6%	64.22%	11.39%	10.54%	1.35%	0.89%	0.82%	3.08%	7.71%	52.83pp
EC4UC	1–6 March 2025	700	±3.6%	57.28%	12.83%	10.83%	1.28%	0.31%	1.36%	4.31%	11.8%	44.45pp
EC4UC	14–18 December 2024	702	±3.6%	55.74%	17.98%	10.41%	3.48%	2.60%	2.45%	2.21%	5.11%	37.76pp
2018 election				14.23%	6.28%	71.28%	0.35%	–	3.36%	–	4.52%	57.05pp

== Results ==
Candidate	Party	Votes	%
Paul Biya	Cameroon People's Democratic Movement	2,474,179	53.66
Issa Tchiroma	Cameroon National Salvation Front	1,622,334	35.19
Cabral Libii	Cameroonian Party for National Reconciliation	157,568	3.42
Bello Bouba Maigari	National Union for Democracy and Progress	112,758	2.45
Patricia Ndam Njoya	Cameroon Democratic Union	76,721	1.66
Joshua Osih	Social Democratic Front	55,841	1.21
Seta Caxton Ateki	Liberal Alliance Party	39,935	0.87
Hiram Samuel Iyodi	Front of Cameroonian Democrats	18,828	0.41
Serge Espoir Matomba	United People for Social Renovation	15,925	0.35
Jacques Bouhga-Hagbe	Cameroonian National Citizen Movement	13,612	0.30
Pierre Kwemo	Union of Socialist Movements	12,873	0.28
Akere Muna	Univers	10,252	0.22
Total		4,610,826	100.00
Valid votes		4,610,826	98.77
Invalid/blank votes		57,620	1.23
Total votes		4,668,446	100.00
Registered voters/turnout		8,082,692	57.76
Source: Constitutional Council

== Aftermath ==
A week before the election, Minister of Territorial Administration Paul Atanga Nji said that any unauthorized release of results would be deemed "high treason," saying that only the Constitutional Council can declare a winner. Despite official results not being released yet, Issa Tchiroma declared himself the winner of the election in a speech on social media post on 14 October, and called on president Biya to concede. Grégoire Owona, deputy secretary-general of Biya's RDPC, said that Tchiroma did not win and did not have the polling results. Atanga also accused Tchiroma of plotting "a cleverly planned diabolical plan with his occult networks at home and abroad aimed at setting Cameroon ablaze".

On 15 October, Tchiroma alleged that vote tampering had taken place, while protests broke out in several cities over allegations of electoral fraud, including at the Elecam headquarters in Douala. The offices of the RDPC in Dschang was set on fire. An armed vigil was established by Tchiroma's supporters outside his residence in Garoua. More than 800 were arrested nationwide, while conflict reports emerged as to the number of deaths, with authorities saying that 16 people were killed in the protests while opposition groups said the death toll was at 55. Data from United Nations sources suggest 48 dead, while Human Rights Watch said that 2,000 people had been detained, many of whom had not been presented in court.

On 19 October, Tchiroma released tallies showing him having won about 60% of the vote. The next day, the National Vote Counting Commission released provisional results showing Paul Biya leading with 53% of the vote, followed by Tchiroma at 35%. The announcement of Biya as the provisional winner set off protests in multiple cities. A teacher died after she was reportedly shot by a police officer during protests in Garoua on 21 October.

On 3 November, a three-day lockdown was launched by Tchiroma in protest against the election result, with Douala, Maroua and Garoua being particularly affected. A partial shutdown also occurred in Yaounde.

The Episcopal Conference of Cameroon, which monitored the election, noted several irregularities during the election, including the relocation of polling stations and failure to update the electoral register, which contained the names of deceased persons.

The Constitutional Council announced the official results of the election on 27 October.

On 6 November, Paul Biya was inaugurated for a new term as president. Tchiroma fled to Nigeria then The Gambia, arriving Nov 7, 2025, where he was granted temporary humanitarian asylum by the Gambian government; he has continued to describe himself as "president-elect" from exile through 2026.

== See also ==
- 2020 Cameroonian parliamentary election
