= Marinette Yetna =

Cameroonian politician (1965–2021)

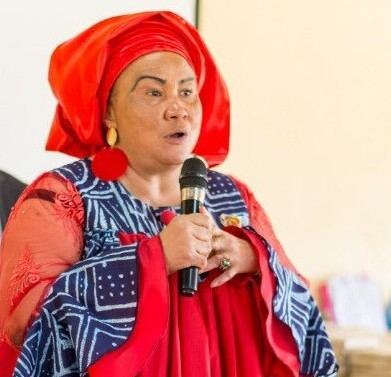
- Born: Marinette Ngo Yetna; 10 December 1965; Logbadjeck
- Died: 24 May 2021 (aged 55); Douala
- Other name: Marinette Mbeleg
- Occupation: politician
- Years active: 1985 - 2021

Marinette Ngo Yetna (1965 – 24 May 2021) was a Cameroonian politician who served as a Deputy.

== Early life and career ==
Ngo Yetna Marinette was born on 19 December 1965 in Logbadjeck, a locality in the Sanaga-Maritime department in the Littoral region of Cameroon. Marinette has five brothers and sisters. She grew up in Edea and completed her secondary education in the Edea Governrment High School.

Marinette Yetna is an entrepreneur, founder and manager of a company called Sotrapi Sarl and also owns the hotel Chez Marinette located in Kribi.

== Political career ==
Marinette Yetna was a member of the CPDM. In 2002 she was elected as the president of the Women organization of the CPDM party for the Sanaga Maritime section and served as municipal councilor for the Edea municipality from 2002 to 2007. She joined parliament in 2013 following her election as a substitute senator in the 2013 senatorial elections of 14 April 2013.

In 2020, she was elected as a deputy in the National Assembly during the 2020 Cameroonian parliamentary election.
