= United People for Social Renovation =

Political party in Cameroon

United People for Social Renovation Peuple Uni pour la Rénovation Sociale
- Abbreviation: PURS (French); UPSR (English)
- First Secretary: Serge Espoir Matomba
- Founded: 14 May 2010; 16 years ago
- Ideology: Anti-corruption; Social justice Economic liberalism
- Colors: Brown
- Senate: 0 / 100
- National Assembly: 0 / 180

United People for Social Renovation (French: Peuple Uni pour la Rénovation Sociale, PURS) is a political party in Cameroon founded in 2010 by Serge Espoir Matomba, who serves as its First Secretary.

== History ==
The party was founded in 2010 by Serge Espoir Matomba and others and was legally recognized on 14 May 2010. It did not nominate a candidate for the 2011 presidential election. The party contested the 2013 parliamentary election, but failed to win a seat in the National Assembly.

In the 2018 presidential election, Matomba was the party's candidate and received 19,704 votes, or 0.56% of the vote. The PURS subsequently contested the 2020 parliamentary and municipal elections, but failed to win a seat in the National Assembly. Matomba was elected as a municipal councillor in Douala IV in 2013 and was subsequently elected a councillor of the Douala city council in 2020.

In 2021, Matomba condemned an ambush of Rapid Intervention Brigade troops by Anglophone separatists as "shameful attack on Cameroon's democracy".

== Ideology ==
The PURS has run on a platform political and governmental reform in opposition to Paul Biya's government, with Matomba calling for greater accountability and reforms to public institutions. Its programmes have also emphasized employment, education, economic development and social justice.

The party has been strongly committed to social and economic issues. In July 2014, Matomba and other party officials began a hunger strike to protest the government's increase in hydrocarbon prices and its proposed ratification of the Economic Partnership Agreement between Cameroon and the European Union. The strike ended after three days following the authorities' intervention and an agreement that the protesters would submit a memorandum to the president.

The party has advocated policies intended to encourage private-sector development and entrepreneurship. Its earlier economic proposals included reducing the corporate tax rate from 30% to 10%, exempting some small start-up businesses from taxation, and prioritizing business growth and job creation before introducing a higher minimum wage. The party argued that an immediate increase in the minimum wage could place excessive pressure on Cameroonian businesses.

During the 2025 presidential election, the party's programme placed greater emphasis on national sovereignty, institutional reform and economic transformation. It proposed a constitutional referendum, stronger anti-corruption institutions, the creation of a national currency to replace the CFA franc, increased industrialization and greater domestic processing of natural resources. It also advocated reforms to education, including greater emphasis on national history and technical and vocational training.

== Election results ==
=== Presidential elections ===
Election	Party candidate	Votes	%	Result
2011	Did not participate			
2018	Serge Espoir Matomba	19,704	0.76%	Lost ✗
2025	Serge Espoir Matomba	15,925	0.35%	Lost ✗

=== National Assembly elections ===
Election	Leader	Votes	%	Seats	+/–	Position	Status
2013	Serge Espoir Matomba	4,086	0.10	0 / 180	New	8th	Extra-parliamentary
2020	Serge Espoir Matomba	Unknown		0 / 180	—	—	Extra-parliamentary
