= Nourane Fotsing Moluh Hassana =

Cameroonian entrepreneur and politician

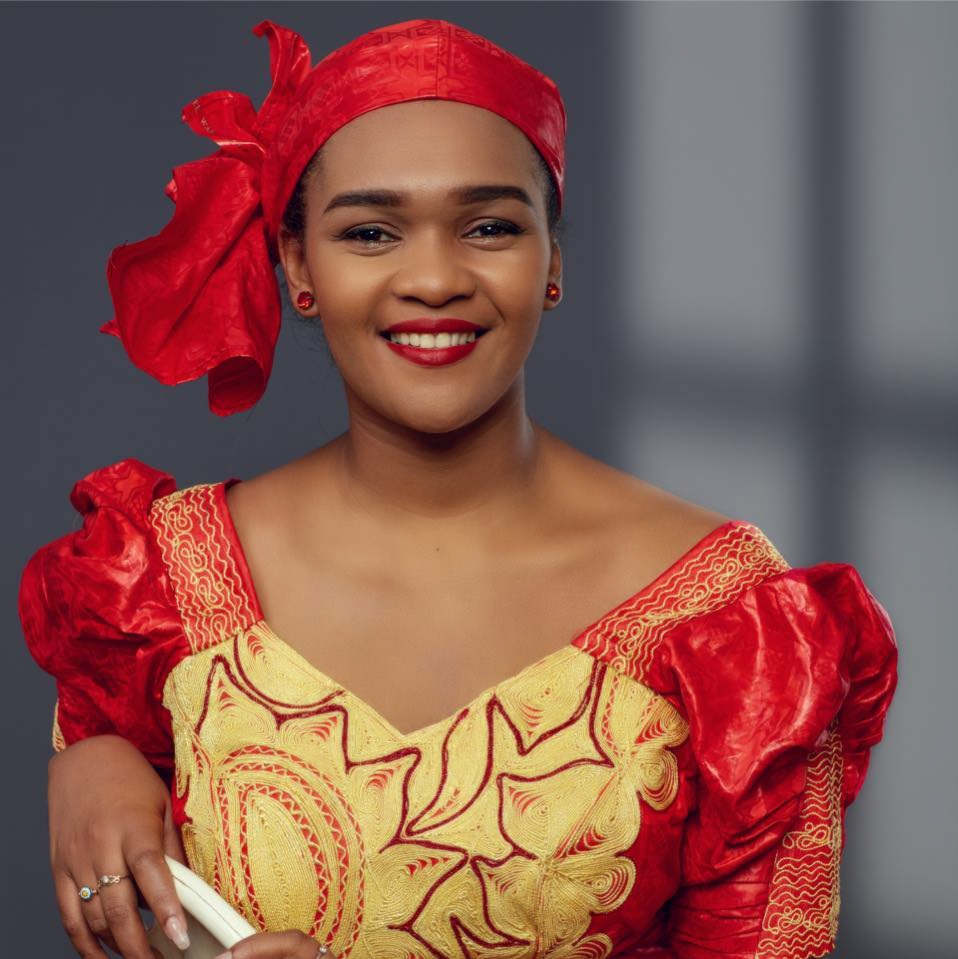
- Incumbent
- Assumed office March 2020

Personal details
- Born: 11 December 1987 (age 38) Cairo, Egypt
- Party: Cameroonian Party for National Reconciliation

Nourane Moluh Hassana Epse Fotsing, also known as Nourane Foster (born December 11, 1987, in Cairo, Egypt) is a Cameroonian entrepreneur and politician. In the 2020 Cameroonian parliamentary election she was elected to the National Assembly as a member of the Cameron voice Party for National Reconciliation (CPRN). She is the founder of the Nourishka brand and runs the companies Nourishka Hair, Nourishka Cosmétiques and Nourishka Hôtel.
