= Constitution of Cameroon =

The Constitution of Cameroon is the supreme law of the Republic of Cameroon. Adopted in 1972, it is Cameroon's third constitution. The document consists of a preamble and 13 Parts, each divided into Articles. The Constitution outlines the rights guaranteed to Cameroonian citizens, the symbols and official institutions of the country, the structure and functions of government, the procedure by which the Constitution may be amended, and the process by which the provisions of the Constitution are to be implemented.

Cameroon adopted its earliest Constitution upon independence from France in 1960. This was a hurried draft based closely on French precedents. In 1961, British Southern Cameroons gained its independence and voted to join its French counterpart. Delegates framed a new Constitution, which made Cameroon a federation of two states under a single powerful president. In 1972, President Ahmadou Ahidjo pushed through a new document that abolished the federal system, renamed the country the Unitary Republic of Cameroon, and granted the president greater powers. After assuming the presidency, Paul Biya pushed through a revised Constitution in 1984. This document changed the country's name to the Republic of Cameroon, redrew the lines of the provinces, and redefined the line of succession to the presidency. The current Constitution was adopted in 1996 in response to pressure from Anglophone Cameroonian groups advocating a return to the federal system. It grants greater autonomy to the provinces (renamed regions) and established a Senate as the upper house to the National Assembly. Nevertheless, these provisions are still being agreed on.

== Contents ==
The Constitution begins with a preamble that names the Cameroonian people's cultural and linguistic diversity as an integral part of the nation but expresses the desire to form a unitary government. It defines the ideals upon which the nation is built as "fraternity, justice and progress". The preamble asserts that the Cameroonian people shall advance "ever-growing bonds of solidarity among African Peoples" and shall adhere to "the principles enshrined in the Charter of the United Nations". The preamble declares that the nation shall use its natural resources to improve the lives of its citizens.

The preamble lists several "inalienable rights" granted to all Cameroonian citizens. Among them are the Universal Declaration of Human Rights, the Charter of the United Nations, and the African Charter on Human and Peoples' Rights. The preamble is the only portion of the Constitution to have remained unchanged since 1960.

Part One (Articles one–3) gives the name of the country as the Republic of Cameroon and defines the coat of arms, motto, flag, anthem, and seal. It establishes the nation as a "decentralized unitary State". English and French are designated the official languages. Yaoundé is made the national capital. Sovereignty is placed in the hands of the people, and government authorities are established as being elected by "direct or indirect universal suffrage" via secret ballot. The responsibilities of political parties are outlined, and state power is given to the president and the parliament.

Part II (Articles 5–13) defines the offices of the president and prime minister. The election of the president, limits of his term, and his constitutional successor are defined. The president is charged with "[defining] the policy of the nation", "[ensuring] respect for the Constitution", and "[ensuring] the proper functioning of public authorities".

The president is named head of state and head of the armed forces. The president may appoint ambassadors, enact laws, refer matters to the Constitutional Council, appoint civil and military personnel, dissolve the National Assembly, and declare a state of emergency, taking additional powers on a temporary basis.

The prime minister is named head of government, with duties to be defined by the president. The powers of government officials are limited.

Part III (Article 14–24) establishes and define the parliament and the means of the selection of its members and its operations. The legislature is made up of two houses, the National Assembly, and the Senate.

Part IV (Articles 25–36) reserves further rights to the legislature and details how the president and legislature may interact. This includes the ability to grant legislative power to the president under limited circumstances. The section also details the process by which a bill may pass into law.

Part V (Articles 37–42) outlines the powers and responsibilities of the judicial branch of government. The section establishes the Supreme Court, courts of appeal, and the tribunals, and defines their roles. The president retains the power to appoint the members of the judicial branch of government.

Part VI (Articles 43–45) grants the president the ability to "negotiate and ratify treaties and international agreements" and places such treaties over conflicting national law. The Constitutional Council retains the right to examine the Constitutionality of such agreements.

Part VII (Articles 46–52) defines the Constitutional Council and its duties to rule on the Constitutionality of laws and to oversee national elections and referendums.

Part VIII (Article 53) establishes and defines the Court of Impeachment. Its duties are to try the president, prime minister, or other members of government in the event of their being charged with high treason.

Part IX (Article 54) creates the Economic and Security Council.

Part X (Articles 55–62) divides the country into 10 semi-autonomous regions. These are to be ruled by regional councils with high levels of control over regional "economic, social, health, educational, cultural and sports development". The president may disband any regional council or dismiss its members under certain conditions. The president may create, rename, or redefine regions as he sees fit.

Part XI (Articles 63 and 64) define the process by which the Constitution may be amended. Such changes require an absolute majority of members of parliament. Alternatively, the president may submit the amendment to a public referendum, which requires a simple majority to pass.

Part XII (Articles 65 and 66) names the preamble "part and parcel of this Constitution" and requires all government officials to "declare their assets and property at the beginning and at the end of their tenure of office."

Part XIII (Articles 67–69) declares that the new institutions created by the 1996 Constitution shall be introduced progressively and that the appropriate elements of the previous Constitution shall remain in force until such time as the changes have been made. The National Assembly maintains the functions of the Senate, the Supreme Court maintains the functions of the Constitutional Council, and the provinces remain in effect until the regions are set up. Legislation enacted prior to the new Constitution remains effective until replaced by subsequent legislation.

== Development ==
=== Constitution of 1960 ===
In 1959, France agreed to grant independence to its Cameroun colony and set a date of 1 January 1960 as the date the new nation would come into being. The original Constitution was hurriedly drafted in 1959 to meet this deadline. The framers based many provisions, such as those outlining the powers of the president, on French models. The Constitution went into effect on 1 January 1960. Under it, Cameroon was defined as a unitary state with a one-house parliament, whose members were directly elected under universal suffrage.

=== Constitution of the Federal Republic of Cameroon ===
When British Southern Cameroons voted to join with French Cameroun 21 months later, delegates of both the Francophone and Anglophone portions of the country drafted a new Constitution at the Foumban Conference. Cameroon was made a federation, with East Cameroon and West Cameroon as its constituent states. The nation changed its name to the Federal Republic of Cameroon. Each state had its own prime minister and legislature; in East Cameroon, the legislature was unicameral, but in West Cameroon, the West Cameroon House of Chiefs was added. The Constitution established a powerful federal government. The president presided over the union, served by his Vice President, cabinet, and a 50-member federal legislature.

The new document went into force on 1 October 1961. In 1969, the Constitution was amended to "prolong the life of the federal assembly" and to alter the selection process for the prime ministers of the states. For many years, the vice-president and the prime minister of West Cameroon were the same person, but in 1970, another amendment stipulated that the vice president could not hold any other government office.

=== Constitution of the United Republic of Cameroon ===
In 1972, a new Constitution was drafted. The document abolished the federal system and placed broad political power in the position of the president. The name of the country was changed to the United Republic of Cameroon. The previous legislative system was replaced by a unicameral National Assembly of 120 seats. The speaker of the National Assembly was established as the successor to the president. Nevertheless, the body held little real power.

The new document was put to a popular referendum and approved on 20 May 1972. On 2 June 1972, President Ahmadou Ahidjo issued Decree 72-270, bringing the new document into law. On 9 May 1975, an amendment established the position of prime minister. On 29 June 1979, an amendment established the prime minister as the presidential successor. Under this law, Paul Biya replaced Ahmadou Ahidjo as president of Cameroon in November 1982.

=== Constitution of the Republic of Cameroon of 1984 ===
Biya and Ahidjo feuded behind the scenes over who would maintain political power in Cameroon. After winning the battle, Biya pushed through a new Constitution in 1984. The document primarily altered Articles 1, 5, and 7 of the previous Constitution. Article 1 renamed the country the Republic of Cameroon. Article 5 did away with the post of prime minister. Article 7 established the speaker of the National Assembly as the presidential successor, but it stipulated that any member of government could receive presidential powers in the event of an emergency. This successor or interim president was forbidden to make or change laws or the structure of government, to alter the Constitution, or to participate in the presidential election.

=== Constitution of the Republic of Cameroon of 1996 ===
With the liberalisation of Cameroonian politics in the 1990s, pressure groups from the Anglophone region demanded changes to Cameroon's government, preferring a return to the federal system of government. Paul Biya responded to the pressure, and on 18 January 1996, Law Number 96/06 enacted a new Constitution in Cameroon. The main changes came in Article 14, which established a Senate as the upper house of legislature, and Article 6, which extended the president's term limit to 7 years, and which placed the president of the Senate or vice-president as the president's successor. The Constitution replaces the provinces with semi-autonomous regions.

=== Modifications to the Constitution of the Republic of Cameroon in 2008 ===
On 10 April 2008, the National Assembly overwhelmingly passed a bill to amend Law 96/06 to change the Constitution to provide the president with immunity from prosecution for acts as president and to allow the chief executive to run for unlimited re-elections, along with a number of other changes. The vote took place after the opposition Social Democratic Front (SDF) representatives walked out of the assembly, and just one month after the 2008 Cameroonian anti-government protests, widespread violence that resulted in dozens of deaths and hundreds of arrests of demonstrators protesting price rises and the proposed constitutional changes.

There was limited public discussion of the changes leading up to the vote, with declarations by SDF leader John Fru Ndi reportedly prohibited in the national press and television by Alain Belibi Director of Information at the CRTV. A song titled "50 years in power" by popular Cameroon singer Longuè Longuè was also reportedly banned by the Director of Programmes at the CRTV, Celestin Boten, and one journalist who had played the song, Billy Karson, was suspended and banned from air. Another artist Lapiro De Mbanga, who had composed a song titled "Constitution constipée" ("Constipated Constitution") was arrested, and painter Joe La Conscience (Joe De Vinci Kameni), who had attempted to walk from Loum to Yaoundé to give a petition of 100 signatures to Cameroon President Paul Biya against the constitutional changes, was sentenced to six months in prison. He and a colleague were arrested after initiating a hunger strike for having held a prohibited meeting, the meeting reportedly consisted of two individuals in his private residence at Tsinga.

The proposed changes were published in the national newspaper, the Cameroon Tribune, on 7 April 2008, however the changes listed did not include proposed changes to Article 53 paragraphs 3 and 5, the paragraphs according immunity to the president.

Five members of parliament voted against the bill. Opposition lawmakers and at least one member of the ruling Cameroon People's Democratic Movement (CPDM), Paul Abine Ayah, member for Akwaya, criticised the bill as a setback for democracy and the country in general. Following the vote it was revealed that Ayah, who had indicated he would vote against the bill, was absent during the vote, and despite having established no procuration, a supportive ballot was cast in his name by fellow CPDM MP Monjowa Lifaka Emilia, member for Fako West. The Presidential Delegate Minister to the National Assembly, Gregoire Owona, reportedly indicated on the Cameroon state-owned national radio station, CRTV, that he had seen a procuration signed by Paul Abine Ayah, however Ayah insisted that he had not signed a procuration for the period of the constitutional law vote but only for the period 28 March 2008 to 31 March 2008. On 17 April 2008 the daily newspaper Quotidien Mutations published what was purported to be a procuration signed by Abine Ayah for the period of the vote. However, Abine Ayah continued to deny having signed a procuration and insisted the published document was a fake.
