= Samuel Efoua Mbozo'o =

Cameroonian politician

Dr. Samuel Efoua Mbozo’o Is a politician from Cameroon who has served as the Secretary General of the Cameroon National Assembly (1988–1992)and as a Member of Cameroon Parliament (1997–2002) He is an honorary member of Global Unification International.

== Biography ==
He served also as Deputy Clerk in charge of Legislative Business of the Panafrican Parliament, the legislative Advisory Body of the African Union, Midrand, South Africa (2006–2009). Among his many academic qualifications, Dr. Mbozo’o has earned a Doctorat d’Etat (PhD) in History from the University of Yaounde, Thesis: " A Critical Approach to the United Nations Trusteeship over Cameroon Under the French Administration (1946–1960)"and an Advanced Diploma in Scientific and Economic information (University of Claude Bernard-Lyon I France).

Apart from his involvement as a Member of Parliament, Dr. Mbozo’o was also Senior Lecturer in the Department of History at the University of Yaounde I. He works as a consultant in the Parliamentary Administration with the Interparliamentary Union (IPU) through the national Parliaments of Burkina-Faso, Haïti, Rwanda, Burundi, Djibouti, Equatorial Guinea and with the International Association of French Speaking Parliamentarians (AIPLF now APF). He followed many professional training courses in the US Federal Congress (W.D.C.; 1991) and in three State Parliaments of the USA (W.D.C, Nebraska, New York, New Orleans; 1985); in Public Management at the Advanced institute of Public management (Yaounde, 1989); English language course in the Pitman School of English, London (1989).

He is the author of four books:

1. Charles Assa'ale Mbiam, le parlementaire face à l'évolution socio-politique et économique de son pays le Cameroun: 1952–1970, Yaoundé, Ed. Afredit, 2009, 303p.
2. les Noces d'or de la Commune urbaine de Sangmélima: 1950–2000, Yaoundé, Ed. Herodote, 2000
3. Pratiques et procédures parlementaires=Parliamentary Practice and Procedures, a synoptical Approach, Yaoundé, Ed. Herodote, 1998, 275 p.
4. L'Assemblée nationale du Cameroun à la croisée des chemins, Yaoundé, Ed. Herodote, 1995, 135 p.)

He collaborated also to another three books

1. Pan-African Parliament: One Voice, One Africa, Dr G.I. Mongelle et al.(Ed.), Cape Town, HSM, 2007–2008;
2. Ecce Homo: Ferdinand Léopold Oyono, hommage à un classique africain, Pr Mendo Ze G.(Ed.), Paris, karthala, 2007;
3. Dynamiques d'intégration régionale en Afrique Centrale, Prof. D. Abwa et al.(Ed.), yaoundé, PUY, 2001)

He published more than 40 articles and topics in various reviews and journals.
