= Battle of Madawaya =

2016 Boko Haram insurgency battle

- Part of Boko Haram insurgency
Date	May 10-11, 2016
Location	Madawaya forest, Borno State, Nigeria
Result	Cameroonian victory

Belligerents
Cameroon	ISWAP

Commanders and leaders
Unknown	Boukar Kawu (POW)

Strength
1,000	Unknown

Casualties and losses
13 killed	58 killed 5 POWs
- 46 hostages freed

Between May 10 and 11, 2016, Cameroonian forces defeated ISWAP militants near Madawaya, Borno State, Nigeria, capturing ISWAP emir Boukar Kawu.

== Background ==
Boko Haram emerged in 2009 as a jihadist social and political movement in a failed rebellion in northeast Nigeria. Throughout the following years, Abubakar Shekau unified militant Islamist groups in the region and continued to foment the rebellion against the Nigerian government, conducting terrorist attacks and bombings in cities and communities across the region. On 7 March 2015, the group publicly declared allegiance to the Islamic State and became known as the Islamic State – West Africa Province (ISWAP).

By early 2016, ISWAP was mostly on the backfoot after having been driven out by Nigerian and allied forces. A brief incursion into Ngoshe and Kumche by Cameroonian soldiers killed several hundred fighters, but otherwise the group was active.

== Battle ==
On the night of May 10 to 11, the Cameroonian and Nigerian armies were conducting an operation with 1,000 soldiers against ISWAP in the Madawaya forest in Borno, about seven kilometers from the Cameroonian border. The operation was conducted by the Cameroonian Special Defense Forces, part of the Multinational Joint Task Force's Sector 1, with help from troops from the MNJTF's Operations Alpha and Emergence IV. At Madawaya, Cameroonian forces destroyed three ISWAP camps, freeing 46 Nigerian and Cameroonian hostages including 18 women and 28 children.

According to Cameroonian government spokesman Issa Tchiroma, 58 jihadists were killed during the operation and five others were taken prisoner, including ISWAP emir Boukar Kawu. Large caches of small arms and hand weapons like spears were seized as well. Officially, the Cameroonian government did not report any losses. However, a funeral was held in Yaoundé for thirteen soldiers killed during Operations Alpha and Emergence IV.
