= Rolande Ngo Issi =

Cameroonian politician

Rolande Adèle Ngo Issi
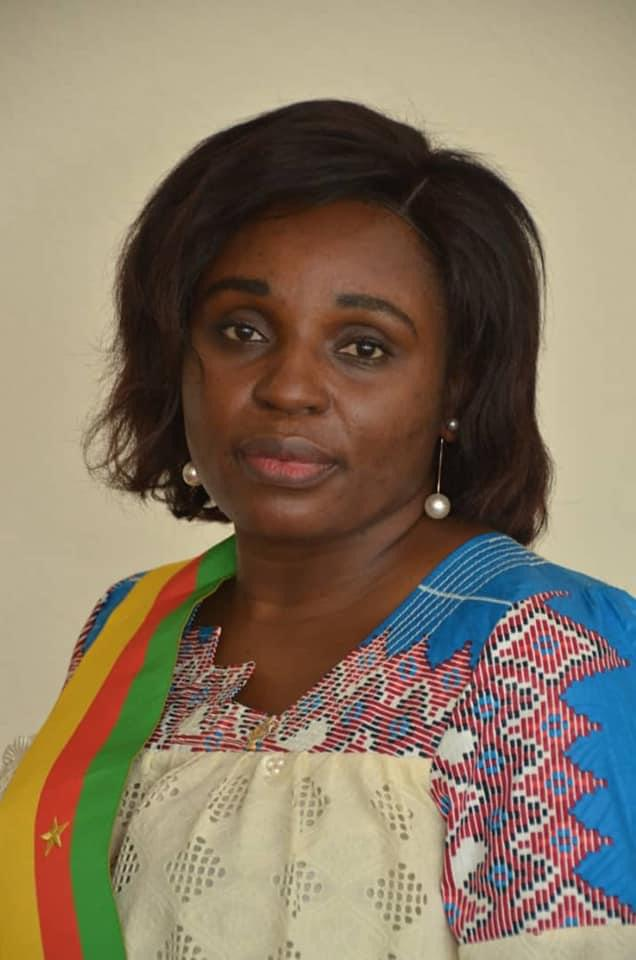
- Born: January 9, 1981 (age 45); Yaoundé
- Education: Master's Degree in Child Psychology, University of Yaoundé I; Bachelor's Degree in Political Science, University of Yaoundé II-SOA; Teaching Certificates, ENS Yaoundé
- Occupations: Politician; Entrepreneur; Educator
- Political party: Cameroonian Party for National Reconciliation (PCRN)

Member of National Assembly
- Incumbent
- Assumed office March 16, 2020

Personal details
- Committees: Cultural, social, & family affairs

Rolande Adèle Ngo Issi Kella Simgwa (born January 9, 1981, in Yaoundé) is a Cameroonian politician, serving as a member of the national assembly, an alternate member of the Superior Council of the Judiciary, and deputy secretary general of the Network of Women Parliamentarians of Cameroon. Additionally, she holds the position of secretary general of the regional delegation of the Cameroonian Party for National Reconciliation (PCRN) for the Center region.

Since April 2016, she has been the national president of the National Consumer Movement (MNC).

== Education and training ==
Rolande Ngo Issi holds a master's degree in child psychology from the University of Yaoundé I, a bachelor's degree in political science from the University of Yaoundé II-SOA, and teaching certificates from the ENS in Yaoundé.

== Professional career ==
Before entering politics, Rolande Ngo Issi worked as a personal training coach. She spent 11 years as a teacher in a rural area but describes herself as a "housewife".

== Political career ==
In 2020, she was elected as a deputy to the National Assembly. Paul Biya appointed her as a substitute member of the Superior Council of the Magistracy of Cameroon, which Jeune Afrique sees as a sign of reconciliation between the main opposition party, the PCRN, and the ruling party, the RDPC. The same year, she was elected Deputy Secretary General of the newly formed Network of Women Parliamentarians of Cameroon. She also serves as a member of the National Steering Committee of the Cameroonian Party for National Reconciliation (PCRN).

== Associative involvement ==
In 2016, she was elected as the president of the Consumer Movement of Cameroon (NGO).
