= Battle of Ngoshe (2016) =

- Part of Boko Haram insurgency
Date	February 11–15, 2016
Location	Ngoshe, Borno State, Nigeria
Result	Cameroonian victory

Belligerents
Cameroon	Islamic State - West Africa Province

Casualties and losses
2 killed (per Cameroon); 7 wounded	162 killed (per Cameroon)
- 100+ hostages freed (per Cameroon)

Between February 11 and 15, 2016, Cameroonian forces attacked militants from the Islamic State – West Africa Province (ISWAP) in Ngoshe, Borno State, Nigeria, leaving 162 jihadists dead.

== Background ==
Boko Haram emerged in 2009 as a jihadist social and political movement in a failed rebellion in northeast Nigeria. Throughout the following years, Abubakar Shekau unified militant Islamist groups in the region and continued to foment the rebellion against the Nigerian government, conducting terrorist attacks and bombings in cities and communities across the region. On March 7, 2015, the group publicly declared allegiance to the Islamic State and became known as the Islamic State – West Africa Province (ISWAP).

During the 2015 West African offensive, Nigerian, Chadian, and Nigerien forces recaptured large swathes of Borno State that Boko Haram captured in late 2014. The offensive intensified in March, when Chadian and Nigerien forces captured Damasak, Chadian forces captured Dikwa, and Nigerian forces captured Bama and Gwoza. Malam Fatori fell to the allied forces on April 1. Many jihadists fled into the forests of Borno State to recoup their losses. In response, ISWAP forces began attacking Chadian territory in late 2015.

Ngoshe is close to the Nigerian side of Lake Chad. Cameroonian government spokesman Issa Tchiroma said that the town was a hub of ISWAP workshops, bomb laboratories, and a local headquarters. Young boys, girls, and adults were strapped with bombs to defend the town against Cameroonian forces.

== Battle ==
Cameroonian forces serving with the Multinational Joint Task Force launched a raid into Nigeria from Logone-et-Chari Department in Cameroon on February 11, with approval from the Nigerian government. The offensive took place within the MNJTF's Operation Arrow Five. On day one, Cameroonian general Jacob Kodji said that 27 jihadists were killed alongside one Cameroonian soldier. The fallen soldier was Captain Emmanuel Yari in the Rapid Intervention Brigade (BIR). Seven other soldiers were wounded.

Over the next four days, Cameroonian officials claimed 162 jihadists were killed by February 15, alongside one more Cameroonian soldier named Lt. Col. Kwene Ekwene Beltus Honore, who was killed in a landmine explosion on February 14. The Cameroonian government also claimed to have freed over 100 hostages, including 15 Cameroonian nationals. Tchiroma said "Boko Haram got what was coming to them." Large caches of ammunition were seized from ISWAP depots in Ngoshe, as well as four homemade mine factories dismantled.
