= 2008 Cameroonian anti-government protests =

The 2008 Cameroon protests were a series of violent demonstrations in Cameroon's biggest cities that took place from 25 to 29 February 2008. The protests followed on the heels of a strike by transport workers, who were opposing high fuel prices and poor working conditions. Further political turmoil had been caused by President Paul Biya's announcement that he wanted the constitution to be amended to remove term limits; without such an amendment, he would have to leave office at the end of his term in 2011. Large groups of youths, whom the opposition Social Democratic Front (SDF) political party and the government blame one another for organising, took to the streets of Douala, Yaoundé, Bamenda, and other major cities, looting and vandalising property. The government sent in troops to crack down on the unrest, and protesters and troops alike were killed. The official government tally is that 40 people were killed, but human rights groups claim that the total is closer to 100. Government figures place damage to property at tens of billions of francs CFA (15.2 million euros or US$23.4 million).

In response to the protests, President Biya reduced the cost of fuel, raised salaries of civil servants and military personnel, reduced the duties paid on cement, and suspended duties on essential goods such as cooking oil, fish, and rice. Government forces also claimed to have arrested more than 1,600 people, including government officials, and to have prosecuted 200. Human rights groups and defense attorneys, on the other hand, claimed that more than 2,000 people had been arrested in Douala alone and decried the trials as overly swift, secretive, and severe. The government has also cracked down on artists, media outlets and journalists it accuses of threatening national stability.

== Causes ==
The protests grew out of a strike by the urban transport union, which consists of bus, taxi, and lorry drivers. The union was angered over the rise in fuel prices and poor working conditions in Cameroon; so they scheduled a strike for 25 February 2008. Further unrest was fomented in response to generally high cost of living in Cameroon, high unemployment among youths, and President Paul Biya's proposal that the constitution be amended to abolish term limits on the presidency and allow him to run in the 2011 election. Biya has been president of Cameroon since 1982. On 23 February, an unauthorised protest of several hundred Cameroonians in the Douala suburb of Newtown, opposing Biya's proposed constitutional reforms, was broken up by police who allegedly turned tear gas and water cannons on the demonstrators, killing at least one. Conditions in Douala were peaceful the following day until that evening, when gunfire was heard near Douala International Airport.

According to Hamidou Yaya Marafa, Minister of State, Minister of Territorial Administration and Decentralisation, the Cameroonian government learned in January that the Social Democratic Front (SDF), the main opposition to the ruling Cameroon People's Democratic Movement (CPDM) political party, had formulated a plan they dubbed "Operation Kenya" to bring instability to Douala, Cameroon's biggest city and chief port. In response, the government indefinitely banned street demonstrations in the Littoral Province, where Douala is located. Undeterred, SDF leaders met at the Bamenda home of party chairman John Fru Ndi in late January, government officials claim, with the aim of organising street demonstrations across the country. Marafa says that the SDF planned to have members from both the government and civil sectors participate in the protests. Meanwhile, the SDF allegedly offered training to young people in how to stage an effective street demonstration.

Fru Ndi and the SDF have rejected the government's claims, citing several peaceful SDF-led protests in the past. Fru Ndi told the government to look at their own policies as the cause of the unrest. Fru Ndi said that he had information that implicated government officials with "[manipulating] the State apparatus and its information system" in a bid to deflect attention from their own corruption.

== Protests ==
The protests began on 25 February 2008 in Douala. Because of the transport strike scheduled for that day and general fear, the streets were empty of all traffic but the transport used by government forces. Heavy gunfire was reported that morning, and youths burnt cars, tyres, and vegetation to block off major roads and bridges; the city was filled with plumes of smoke. Meanwhile, groups of young people looted and vandalised property, including petrol stations and a retail store. Reports on national radio said that a finance ministry building, a town hall, and other government structures were aflame. IRIN reported seeing a firefight between protesters and police at the airport and witnessing victims of gunshot wounds in the city. Police responded with widespread arrests.

On 26 February, the government agreed to a reduction in petrol prices of 6 francs CFA (less than 1 US¢) per litre, and the transport union called off its strike that night. The head of the taxi union, Jean Collins Ndefossokeng, told Radio France International that "it is no longer a good time for the strike with the current vandalism." Nevertheless, violence had already gotten out of hand by this point and continued.

By 2 February, the protests had spread to other Cameroonian cities. Government figures show that the protests eventually spread to 31 municipal areas in five of Cameroon's ten provinces: the Centre, Littoral, Northwest, Southwest, and West. Marafa claims that the SDF collected and transported youths between hot points, including Bafoussam, Bamenda, Douala, and Yaoundé. Government forces allegedly stopped such convoys outside major cities on 25 and 27 February.

Witnesses reported heavy gunfire in Yaoundé on 27 February. One resident reported rioters looting and burning a market. The government flooded the streets of the capital with soldiers. Demonstrators threw stones and erected flaming barricades. Government forces responded with tear gas. Troops were stationed throughout the city and at petrol stations, and barricades were set up. Similar methods were used in other cities, and troops in Douala used water cannons. Meanwhile, looting and burning continued in Douala, where witnesses reported victims of gunshot wounds lining the streets.

According to a BBC reporter, troops confronted about 2,000 demonstrators on a bridge in Douala, and some 20 individuals fell into the river.

In Kumba, demonstrators marched with posters demanding Biya's resignation and for the government to reduce the cost of fuel and petroleum products. In Bamenda, some reportedly targeted boarding schools, where the nation's elite send their children. The protesters, reportedly armed with bottles of petrol, rocks, and sticks, threatened to burn the school down unless the students came with them, possibly for use as human shields against government forces. One boarding school reported that 200 teenage boys were taken by the protesters but the rest of the children were allowed to stay. Reports indicate that similar scenarios took place at other schools. Most of the children managed to escape back to the school or their parents' home. Others broke into the Social Affairs Delegation and stole 4 million francs CFA. The government accused the mayor of the Njombe-Penja Council of leading a group of demonstrators in an attack on a gendarme station in his town. The mayor was later suspended for this act and for alleged mismanagement of council funds.

Meanwhile, the government reports that two Italians in Cameroon were kidnapped in Douala as part of the violence. They were brought to Bamenda, where their kidnappers demanded ransom. They were eventually let go unharmed, and no ransom was paid. A report from The Associated Press, on the other hand, says that the victims were one Croatian woman and one Italian woman and that a Croatian newspaper has stated that a ransom was indeed paid.

The unrest continued through 29 February 2008.

== Aftermath ==
The government of Cameroon has held three press conferences regarding the crisis. The latest was on 10 March 2008. On 27 February, President Biya made a rare appearance on state-owned television. He accused "certain politicians", whom he dubbed "apprentice sorcerers in the shadows" with fomenting unrest and attempting to orchestrate a coup d'état.

On 27 February, the government reduced fuel costs. On 7 March, Biya declared a rise in pay of 15 percent for civil service employees to take effect 1 April and suspended duties paid on basic commodities such as cooking oil, fish, and rice. He also raised the pay of military personnel. The government reduced the custom duty paid on cement from 20 to 10 percent to address a shortage of building materials. It also announced plans to look at bank and telephone charges.

The government claimed to have arrested more than 1,600 people and to have found 200 guilty of looting and destruction of property with sentences of six months to three years. Human rights groups assert that the actual number of arrests is much higher, with as many as 2,000 arrests in Douala alone, due in part to an apparent randomness to the arrests of both youths who did and did not participate in the demonstrations. As of 26 March 2008, 800 accused were reportedly being held in Douala Central Prison and the government had charged 1,000 to 1,500 citizens. Such organisations and the Cameroon Bar Council spoke out against the trials, deeming them summary and secretive, with extreme sentences. A lawyer in Yaoundé claimed that defendants were being given no time to prepare a defence, and a lawyer in Douala said there was evidence the detainees had been beaten and tortured. According to one report, the defendants are tried en masse (one trial had more than 150 defendants), and defence attorneys are not alerted beforehand whom they will be asked to represent nor given access to police reports and files.

On 5 March, Jean-Michel Nintcheu, chairman of the SDF in the Littoral Province, was arrested in Douala on charges of violating the government ban on public demonstrations. On 7 March, Nintcheu announced that the SDF was calling off demonstrations in the Littoral Province due to "the recent upheavals that rocked many parts of the province, occasioning deaths and destruction of property." Another SDF leader was arrested at the airport attempting to travel to Europe. He was accused of being the mastermind of the demonstrations.

Some semblance of normalcy had returned to Cameroon's cities by 8 March, with traffic jams and people going about their daily business. However, Cameroonians report that the government reprisals and fear of another uprising have created a "climate of terror" in the country.

International media watchdog groups have claimed that the government has heavy-handedly censored the press in Cameroon and intimidated journalists with methods that include beatings and confiscation of equipment. As of 8 March, three media outlets had been shut down by the government, which claimed the moves were in the interest of "stability and social order".

As of 10 March, troops were reportedly searching homes in Kumba for property stolen from Les Brasseries du Cameroun, a brewery, and Transformation Reef Cameroon, a logging company. The Post newspaper, located in Buea, claims that the troops "torture and arrest" anyone in possession of allegedly stolen beverages or computer equipment. If the home is clear of such items, the troops are said to destroy radio and TV equipment. Some residents accuse the soldiers of raping women and stealing money. One man reportedly committed suicide rather than face arrest after troops allegedly found 25 crates of stolen beverages in his home on 6 March.

Despite the protests, the National Assembly voted to change the Constitution to remove term limits on 10 April 2008. Given the CPDM's control of the National Assembly, the change was overwhelmingly approved, with 157 votes in favor and five opposed; the 15 deputies of the SDF chose to boycott the vote in protest, denouncing it as a "constitutional coup". The change also provided for the President to enjoy immunity from prosecution for his actions as President after leaving office.

== Deaths and damages ==
As of 10 March 2008, official government figures put the number of deaths at 40, which includes both government security personnel and civilians. Marafa said that total included those who had been injured and later died. He placed 30 of the deaths in Douala alone, with two dead in Yaoundé and eight in the Northwest, Southwest, and West provinces combined.

On 7 March, the Maison des Droits de L'Homme (House of Human Rights, MDH), a Cameroonian human rights organisation affiliated with the International Federation of Human Rights, claimed the death total was "more than 100". The government denied these figures. According to Madeleine Affite, an MDH member, in one incident alone, 18 people died in Douala. Government forces had protesters trapped on the Wouri River bridge, and people jumped into the river in desperation. Affite says that local fishermen who witnessed the incident have been told by government agents to keep quiet. In another incident, a reported 20 demonstrators were killed in Douala when government forces fired on them. She also claimed that the government has ordered morgues not to release bodies of victims to keep the scale of the deaths caused in the protests a secret. Afité claims that the bans extend to photographing the remains or publishing the results of autopsies of those who died in the protests.

According to the government, during the demonstrations, protesters vandalised and sacked bars, bakeries, government buildings, industrial sites, 33 petrol stations, pharmacies, sales kiosks, security stations, and vehicles. The government estimates the damage caused by the protests at tens of billions of francs CFA (15.2 million euros or US$23.4 million). Government spokesman Marafa claimed that Cameroon had taken a blow to both its economy and its reputation. Finance Minister Johnson Kum Ofon of Meme division estimated the damages to Kumba alone at 695 million francs CFA (US$1.7 million or 1.1 million euros), more than the total amount allotted for infrastructural improvements for 2008.

On 12 April 2008, opposition SDF leader John Fru Ndi called for a national day of mourning for 21 April 2008 to commemorate those who died during the protests and the "death of democracy" in Cameroon due to the April 2008 amendments to the constitution to allow the president to run for more than two terms.
