= Emilia Monjowa Lifaka =

Cameroonian politician (1959–2021)

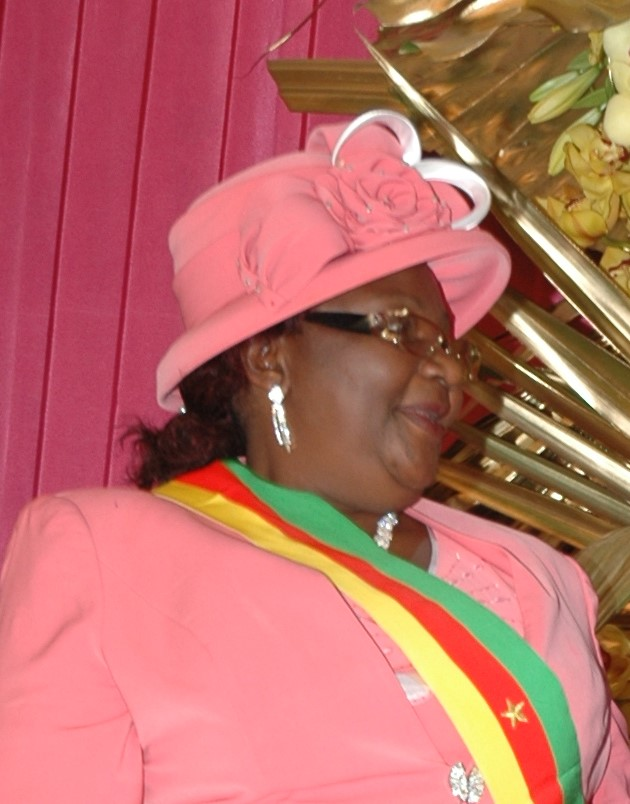
- Monjowa Lifaka in 2012

Member of National Assembly of Cameroon
- In office 2002–2021

Vice President of National Assembly of Cameroon
- In office 2009–2021
- Preceded by: Rose Abunaw

Personal details
- Born: 11 April 1959
- Died: 20 April 2021 (aged 62)
- Citizenship: Cameroon
- Party: Cameroon People's Democratic Movement
- Education: University of Maryland Eastern Shore

Emilia Monjowa Lifaka (11 April 1959 – 20 April 2021) was a Cameroonian politician and chairperson of the Commonwealth Parliamentary Association. She was a member of the National Assembly of Cameroon, first elected in 2002, and was vice-president of the Assembly at the time of her death.

== Early life and education ==
Monjowa Lifaka had a diploma in secretarial and business studies from Crown Secretarial and Business Studies College in England, and a diploma in administrative management from the University of Maryland Eastern Shore in the United States. As of 2017 she was studying for an MBA in human resource management with Anglia Ruskin University in England.

== Political career ==
Monjowa Lifaka represented the South West constituency for the Cameroon People's Democratic Movement (CPDM / RDPC), in the 7th 8th, 9th, and 10th Legislations of the National Assembly of Cameroon, and was its Vice-President from 2009 until her death.

In 2017 she became chairperson of the Commonwealth Parliamentary Association.

== Recognition ==
She was awarded three national honours:

- Knight of the Cameroon National Order of Merit
- Officer of the Cameroon National Order of Merit
- Knight of the National Order of Valour.

== Death ==
Monjowa Lifaka died on 20 April 2021 at the age of 62, from COVID-19.
