= Paul Abine Ayah =

Cameroonian politician (1950–2024)

Member of the National Assembly of Cameroon
- In office 2002–2012

Personal details
- Born: 1950 Akwaya, British Cameroons
- Died: 25 December 2024 (aged 74) Buea, Cameroon
- Party: CPDM (until 2011); PAP
- Education: National School of Administration and Magistracy
- Occupation: Lawyer

Paul Abine Ayah (1950 – 25 December 2024) was a Cameroonian politician and member of the National Assembly of Cameroon. Initially a member of the ruling Cameroon People's Democratic Movement (CPDM), he defected to the opposition People's Action Party. In August 2007, he was elected as Chairman of the Foreign Affairs Committee of the National Assembly of Cameroon. He was a deputy for Manyu in the Southwest Region.

== Life and career ==
Ayah graduated from the National School of Administration and Magistracy (ENAM) in Yaoundé in 1976 and went on to become the vice-president of the Court of Appeal in Buea, until becoming member of the National Assembly of Cameroon in 2002. His constituency centered around his hometown, Akwaya, which is accessible by a poorly maintained road and foot track from Mamfe in Cameroon; the area has been subject to unrest due to land and tribal conflict.

In June 2006, along with other deputies, he called on the government to investigate allegations of high-level corruption involving one of its ministers, Augustin Frédéric Kodock, regarding Kodock's earlier tenure at the head of the Agriculture Ministry.

In November 2007, he indicated his support for a law banning female genital mutilation, which is still practiced by members of the Ejagham tribe in the area he represents as a deputy. He also indicated his support for a law that would ban marriage for children. For women and girls marriage without parental consent is not permitted until 21 in Cameroon, and marriages of girls under 15 years old are not permitted by law, except with presidential permission. However, marriages as young as 8 or 9 years old occur in the north of Cameroon.

In early 2008, Ayah was an outspoken critic of the 2008 changes to the Constitution of Cameroon, which removed term limits that would have prevented President Paul Biya from standing for re-election in 2011. According to Ayah, the changes were "not democratic", and he said that if the bill was adopted it would "will take us back some 200 years." Despite not being present at the vote in the National Assembly and declaring that he had not made a procuration for his vote, a vote was reportedly made in his name.

On 3 January 2011, Ayah resigned from the CPDM and stood for the presidential election. He was later appointed a sitting judge at the Supreme Court of Cameroon. On 4 March 2019, he announced his resignation as president of the PAP.

=== Arrest and release ===
Ayah was arrested on 21 January 2017, in connection with advocating for Cameroon to return to federal system of government as it was in the 1960s. He was tried at the Yaoundé military tribunal with Cameroon Anglophone Civil Society Consortium (CACSC), which is now banned and illegal by the government of Cameroon in relation to the civil unrest in the two English speaking regions of Cameroon. Ayah was released from prison by a presidential decree on 30 August 2017 after spending more than eight months in detention in Yaounde prison.

=== Death ===
Ayah died on 25 December 2024, at the age of 74.
