= Eric Essono Tsimi =

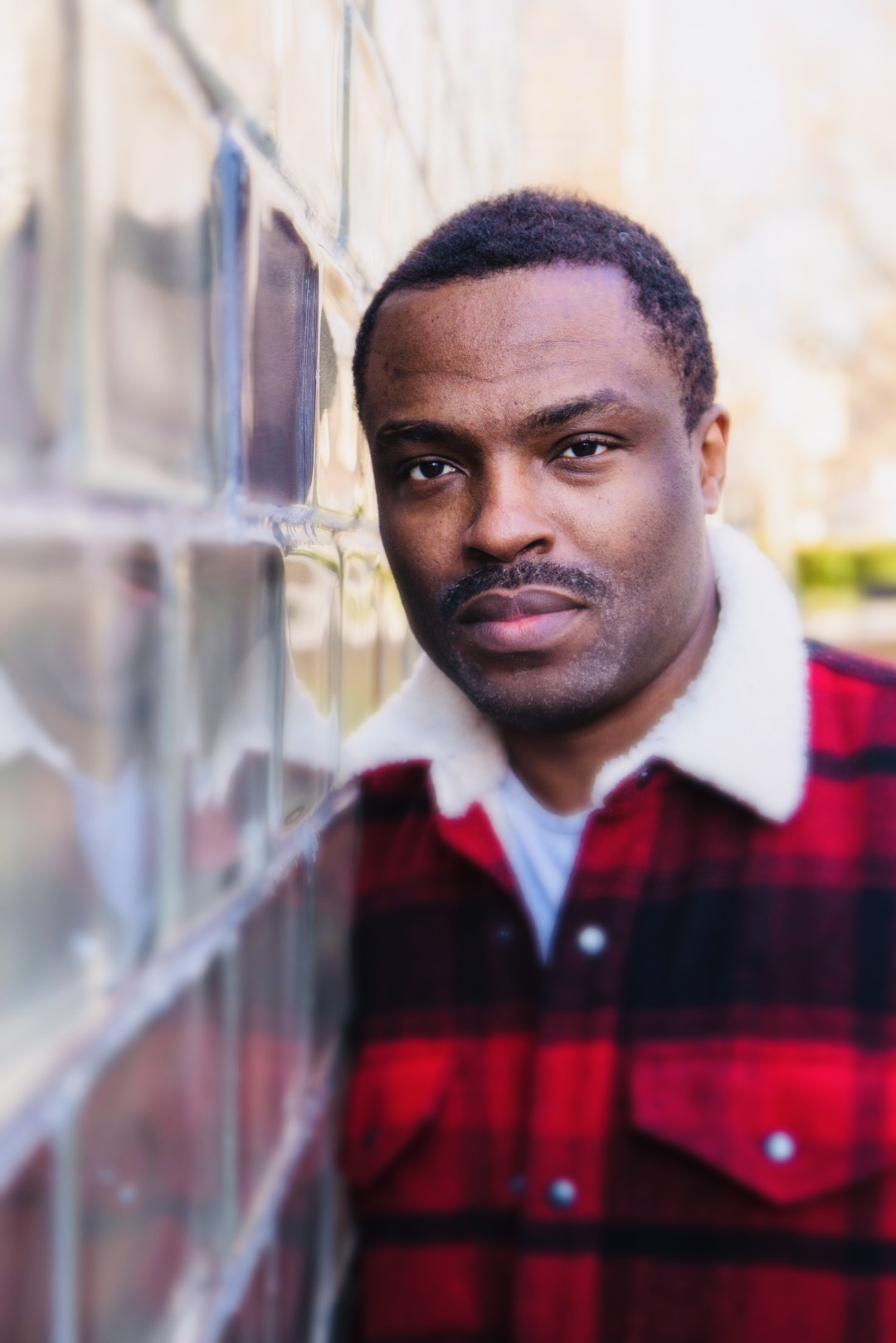
- Eric Essono Tsimi
- Born: Monatélé, Cameroon
- Education: University of Virginia (PhD); Université Grenoble Alpes (PhD); University of Lausanne (PhD)
- Occupations: Author, playwright, professor
- Employer: Northwestern University
- Known for: African and Francophone literature, decolonial studies
- Notable work: Les Inadmirables; L'antiracisme rend-il heureux? De quoi la littérature africaine est-elle la littérature?
- Awards: Humboldt Research Fellowship; Centre National du Livre Creation Grant
- Website: www.erictsimi.com

Eric Essono Tsimi (born in Monatélé, near Yaoundé) is an author, playwright, and university professor. His literary output spans novels, essays, short stories, and theatre, with notable works such as Les Inadmirables (2024), L'antiracisme rend-il heureux? (2022), and Les Ex ne meurent jamais (2017). His intellectual contributions have been acknowledged internationally, earning him distinctions such as the Humboldt Research Fellowship for Experienced Researchers (2022–2023) in Germany and a Creation Grant from the French Centre National du Livre in 2015.

== Education ==
Essono Tsimi first undertook higher education in Cameroon and Canada before pursuing graduate study in France, Switzerland, and the United States. He earned a PhD in French Civilization and Cultural Studies from the University of Virginia in 2019 and a European doctorate jointly awarded by Université Grenoble Alpes (France) and the University of Lausanne (Switzerland) in 2017. At the University of Lausanne, he also taught and conducted research in social psychology.

== Career ==
In 2025, Northwestern University's Weinberg College of Arts and Sciences announced that Tsimi would join its Department of French and Italian as an associate professor for the 2025–2026 academic year; a novelist, literary critic, and cultural theorist, his work focuses on African and Francophone literatures, migration, memory, language politics, and decolonial approaches. Before this appointment, he taught at Baruch College, City University of New York, as an assistant professor of French and Francophone studies and at The Ohio State University as a senior lecturer in Francophone literary and cultural studies.

Tsimi has published more than ten books across genres, including novels, essays, theatre, and scholarly monographs. His 2026 publications include the detective novel New Bell de nuit, published by Lettres Mouchetées, and the monograph L'Auteur face à l'IA : Création littéraire, modèles de langage, équité, published by UGA Éditions. Earlier works include the essay collection Les Inadmirables (2024), the study L'antiracisme rend-il heureux ? : race et ethnicité dans les espaces francophones (2022), and the monograph De quoi la littérature africaine est-elle la littérature ? : pour une critique décoloniale (2022), published by the Presses de l’Université de Montréal. He also authored Vous autres, civilisations, savez maintenant que vous êtes mortelles. De la contre-utopie (2021), which develops the concept of the "counter-utopia" as a critical literary form. His scholarly and public-facing writing addresses migration, memory, race, authorship, and canon formation in Francophone contexts.

In 2015, Tsimi received a bourse de création from the French Centre national du livre (CNL) for the novel project L'Origine du Mal, later published in 2018 by Acoria Éditions; the grant is listed in the CNL's annual report and noted in coverage of his work. His novel Migrants Diaries (2014) was a finalist for the 2015 Prix Ivoire for African Francophone Literature.

On stage, his play Le jeu de la vengeance (2004) has been performed in Cameroon and on international tours. A 2006 production directed by Emery Noudjiep, featuring actress Jeanne Mbenti, won several theatre distinctions, including the prize for best direction at the Festival national du théâtre francophone d’Afrique centrale.

Tsimi also writes fiction in English. His short story "A Brief Eruption of Madness" was longlisted for the 2017 Short Story Day Africa Prize and subsequently included in the anthology ID: Identity – New Short Fiction from Africa (New Internationalist, 2018).

In 2024, he announced his intention to run as a civic, independent candidate in Cameroon's 2025 presidential election, a bid he discussed in interviews on the channel Naja TV and in economic press coverage of his proposals on monetary and economic reform.
