= CamerounWeb =

Cameroon-focused news and opinion website

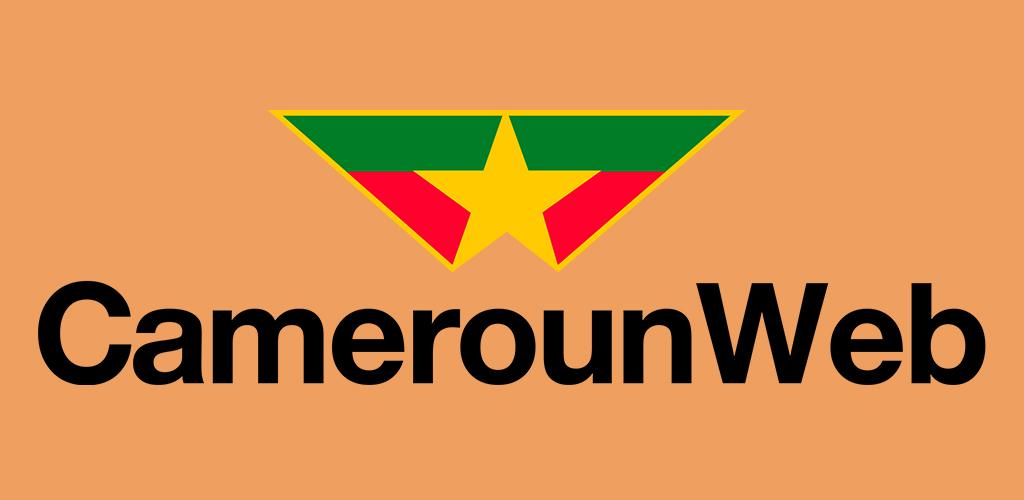
- CamerounWeb
- Website type: General news and information
- Available in: French
- Owner: AfricaWeb Holding
- Website: camerounweb.com
- Commercial: Yes
- Registration: Optional
- Launched: 2014
- Current status: Online

CamerounWeb is an online news site covering news from Cameroon. Created in 2014, the site deals with topics related to current affairs, politics, sport, economy, entertainment, among others. CamerounWeb stood out with its “Tribune” which regularly publishes the opinions of Cameroonians.

== Initiatives ==
In December 2020, CamerounWeb organized the first edition of the CamerounWeb Awards which rewarded the actors who animate the political, socio-cultural and economic life of Cameroon. The various nominees were classified in 9 categories. Winners of the first CameroonWeb Awards were revealed on January 21, 2021.
