= Hermine Patricia Tomaïno Ndam Njoya =

Cameroonian politician (born 1969)

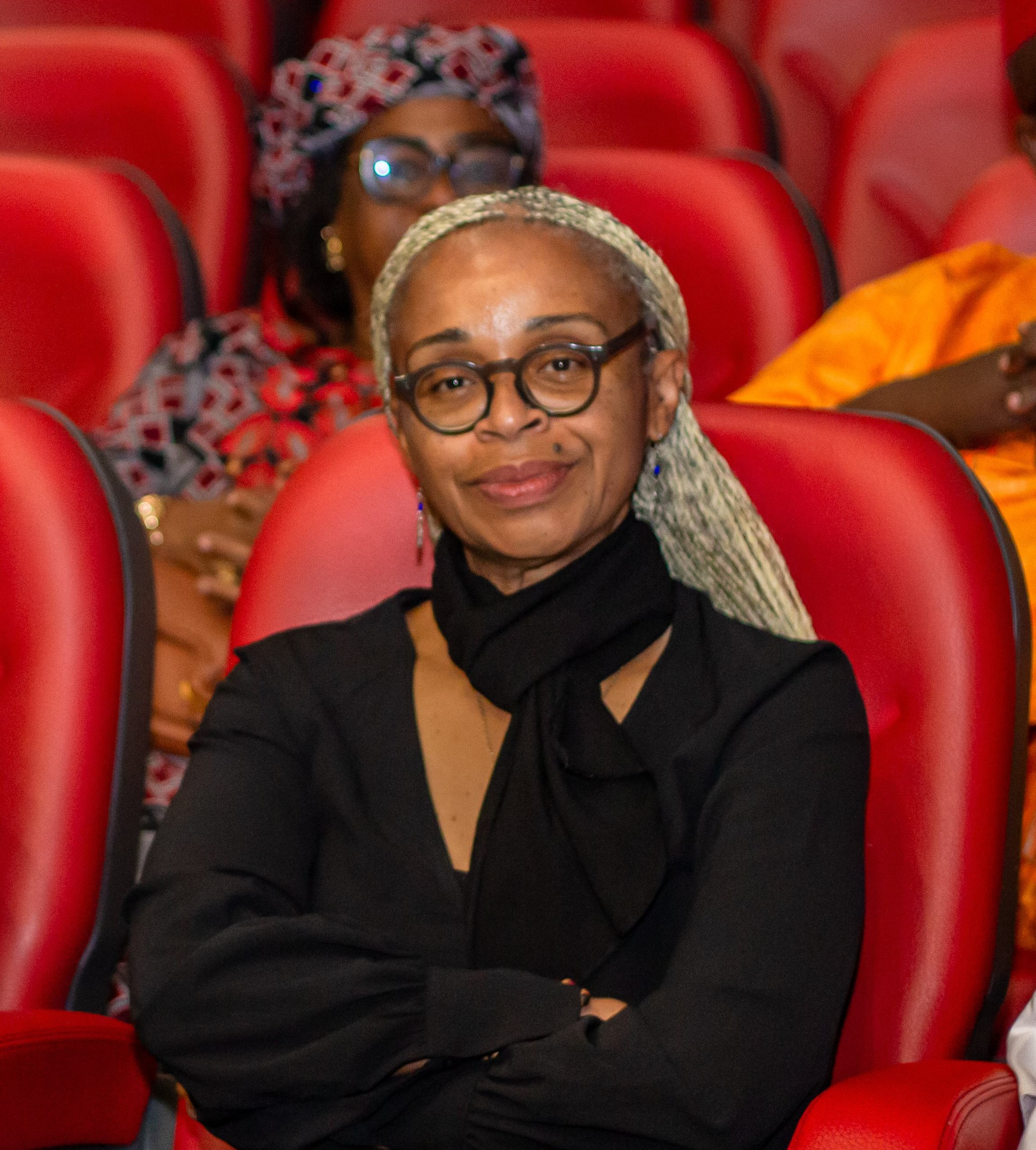
- Ndam Njoya at the Festival Écrans in 2025

President of the Cameroon Democratic Union
- Incumbent
- Assumed office 26 April 2020
- Preceded by: Adamou Ndam Njoya

Mayor of Foumban
- Incumbent
- Assumed office 9 February 2020
- Preceded by: Adamou Ndam Njoya

Member of the National Assembly for Noun
- In office 2007–2020

Personal details
- Born: 26 January 1969 (age 57) Yaoundé, Cameroon
- Party: Cameroon Democratic Union
- Spouse: Adamou Ndam Njoya (deceased)
- Children: 3
- Parent: Ayiagnigni Marie Angèle (mother)
- Education: University of Yaoundé; People's International Institute Histadrut
- Occupation: Politician; entrepreneur; author
- Website: https://www.udc-party.cm/

Hermine Patricia Tomaïno Ndam Njoya (born 26 January 1969) is a Cameroonian politician, entrepreneur and author who has served as President of the Cameroon Democratic Union since 2020. Hon. Tomaïno Ndam Njoya served as a member of the National Assembly from 2007 to 2020. She is currently the mayor of Foumban and the spokesperson of the Regional Council of the West Region.

She was a candidate for the 2025 Cameroonian presidential election.

She heads a coffee company and has been the president of the Association of Cameroonian Women in Coffee (AFECC) since 2016. Hermine Patricia is the widow of Adamou Ndam Njoya, the national president of the UDC.

== Education and training ==
Born in Yaoundé in 1969, Hermine Patricia Tomaino Ndam Njoya grew up in Cameroon between the cities of Yaoundé and Foumban. After completing her primary education, she began her secondary education in 1980 at the Sultan-Njoya High School in Foumban, culminating in obtaining her A4 baccalaureate in 1987.

She then joined the Faculty of Law and Economics at the University of Yaoundé, where she earned a bachelor's degree in law in 1990 and a master's degree in Public law in 1992.

In 2001 she attended the People's International Institute Histadrut for a special program on the role of women in urban rehabilitation.

== Political career ==
Tomaïno Ndam Njoya is the president of the Cameroon Democratic Union (UDC) she became involved in politics in 1991 and participated in opposition marches calling for a return to multipartism.

She joined the UDC at its inception in 1991. She was elected as a member of parliament to the National Assembly for Noun in the 2007 legislative elections.

She served as the secretary of the Committee on Constitutional Laws, Human Rights and Freedoms, Justice, Legislation, and Regulation at the National Assembly of Cameroon.

She was the spokesperson for UDC deputies in the National Assembly from 2007 to 2020. As a member of parliament she was member of the Bureau of the National Assembly, member of the Forum of Women in Africa and Spain for a Better World, member of the African Parliamentarian Union, and Member of Réseau Parlementaire pour la Promotion du Genre—REPAGE.

Despite winning the municipal and legislative elections Member of Parliament in 2020, Hon. Tomaïno Ndam Njoya gave up her seat and chose to become municipal councillor of the City of Foumban and subsequently Mayor of the city of Foumban.

She was elected Regional Councilor of the Western Region, and is the spokesperson of the councilors from the Noun Division from 2020 until the present.

She is the president of the union of Noun Division mayors, Syndicat des Communes du Noun—SYNCONOUN.

She is the spokesperson of the Platform of Opposition leaders for the amendment of the Electoral Code.

== Professional career ==
Ndam Njoya is a specialist in organizational training and has coordinated several programs and projects, including the HIV/AIDS and Children Task Force at the World Conference of Religions for Peace/Hope for African Children Initiative and the PACDDU program, Cameroon-European Union cooperation.

She is also an entrepreneur. Committed to promoting the coffee industry in Africa, she is the president of the Association of Cameroonian Women in Coffee (AFECC). Since 2013, she has also served as the president of the Gender Promotion Committee at the Agency for Robusta Coffee in Africa and Madagascar (ACRAM).

She is the author of several books, including "L'Enfer rose," "Les élections bancales," and "Les Coquelicots de l’Espoir," published in 2016, which recounts the story of her grandfather Angelo Tomaino, of Italian origin.

== Family life ==
Ndam Njoya is the wife of Adamou Ndam Njoya, the president of the Cameroon Democratic Union, who died in Yaoundé on March 7, 2020, at the age of 77. She is also the mother of three children.
