= Guidiguis =

Coordinates: 10°08′N 14°42′E

- Commune and town
- Interactive map of Guidiguis
- Country: Cameroon
- Time zone: UTC+1 (WAT)

Guidiguis is a town and commune in Cameroon, Far-North Region, Mayo-Kani Division.

== See also ==
- Communes of Cameroon
