= Cameroonian Party for National Reconciliation =

Cameroonian Party for National Reconciliation Parti camerounais pour la réconciliation nationale
- Abbreviation: PCRN (French); CPNR (English)
- Leader: Cabral Libii
- Founders: Albert Fleury Massardine; Robert Kona}
- Founded: 14 February 2003
- Headquarters: Yaounde
- National Assembly: 5 / 180

Website
- www.pcrn-france.fr

The Cameroonian Party for National Reconciliation (French: Parti camerounais pour la réconciliation nationale; PCRN or CPNR) is a political party in Cameroon, created on 14 February 2003.

== History ==
The party was created with the collaboration of Albert Fleury Massardine and Robert Kona. Massardine's son, the current secretary general, is the intermediary between Cabral Libii and the PCRN, in search of a party that will invest him.

On 4 January 2024, Cabral Libii is due to appear before the Mayo-Kan Court of First Instance in Kaélé (Far North). At a press conference in December 2023 in Yaoundé, Robert Kona, former civil administrator and founder of the party, accused him of having used the 11 May 2019 meeting in Guidiguis, Mayo-Kani to oust him and take control of the PCRN. He also declared that the PCRN would never invest Cabral Libii.

Its congress announced by Cabral Libii in Kribi in December 2023 was prohibited.

The PCRN is considered the third political force in the country during the 2020 Cameroonian parliamentary election with 5 deputies elected to the National Assembly.

The party president is Cabral Libii, elected on 11 May 2019, during the first party congress held in Guidiguis in the Far North region. He replaced Robert Kona, founder of the PCRN, who has led the party since its creation in 2003. Since 2018, Anne Féconde Noah has been the party's first vice-president.

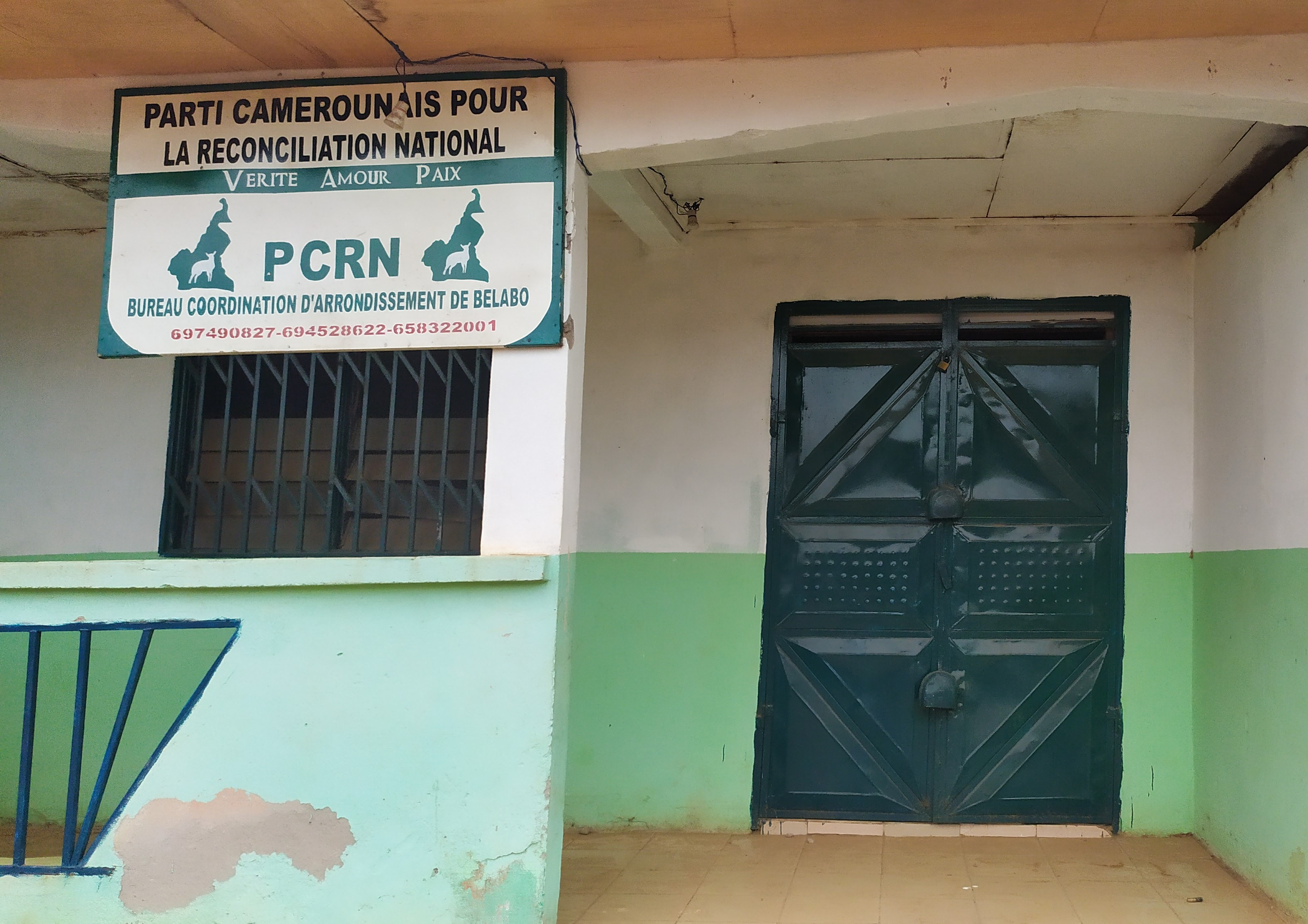
PCRN office in Belabo, Eastern Region.

The PCRN participated in the legislative and municipal elections of February 2020, and won 5 seats in the national assembly, 7 municipalities, and more than 200 municipal councilors.

== PCRN deputies in the National Assembly ==
Member of Parliament	Constituency	Région
Cabral Libii	Nyong-et-Kéllé	Centre
Ngo Issi Rolande Adele	Nyong-et-Kéllé	Centre
Ndjip Bienvenu	Nyong-et-Kéllé	Centre
Biba Francois Prostin	Sanaga-Maritime	Littoral
Nourane Fotsing Moluh Hassana	Wouri Est	Littoral

== Election results ==
=== Presidential elections ===
Election	Party candidate	Votes	%	Result
2025	Cabral Libii	157,568	3.42%	Lost ✗
