= Union of Socialist Movements =

Union of Socialist Movements Union des mouvements socialistes
- Abbreviation: USM
- Leader: Pierre Kwemo
- Founded: 2011
- Headquarters: Yaounde
- Ideology: Social democracy Civic nationalism
- Political position: Center-left
- Colors: Blue
- National Assembly: 2 / 180
- Senate: 0 / 100

The Union of Socialist Movements, abbreviated as USM (French: Union des mouvements socialistes abbreviated as UMS), is a political party in Cameroon.

It was founded in 2011 by Pierre Kwemo, former vice-president of the Social Democratic Front (SDF).

In March 2022, the political party joined forces with the SDF, the Cameroonian Party for National Reconciliation (PCRN) and the Cameroon Democratic Union (UDC) to form a sixteen-member opposition parliamentary group in the National Assembly called "Union for Change".

== Election results ==
=== Presidential elections ===
Election	Party candidate	Votes	%	Result
2025	Pierre Kwemo	12,873	0.28%	Lost ✗

=== National Assembly elections ===
Year	Votes	%	Rank	Seats
2020	—			2 / 180

=== Senate elections ===
Year	Votes	%	Seats	Rank
2018	26	0.26	0 / 70	7th
2023	55	0.51	0 / 70	7th
