= Coat of arms of Cameroon =

- Armiger: Republic of Cameroon
- Adopted: 1986
- Motto: Paix, Travail, Patrie (English: "Peace, Work, Fatherland")

The coat of arms of Cameroon consists of a shield with a banner above and below it. Behind the shield are two crossed fasces. The shield has the same color pattern as the flag of Cameroon, and in the center is a map of the nation. The scales of justice are superimposed on top of the map of the nation since 1984.

== Description ==
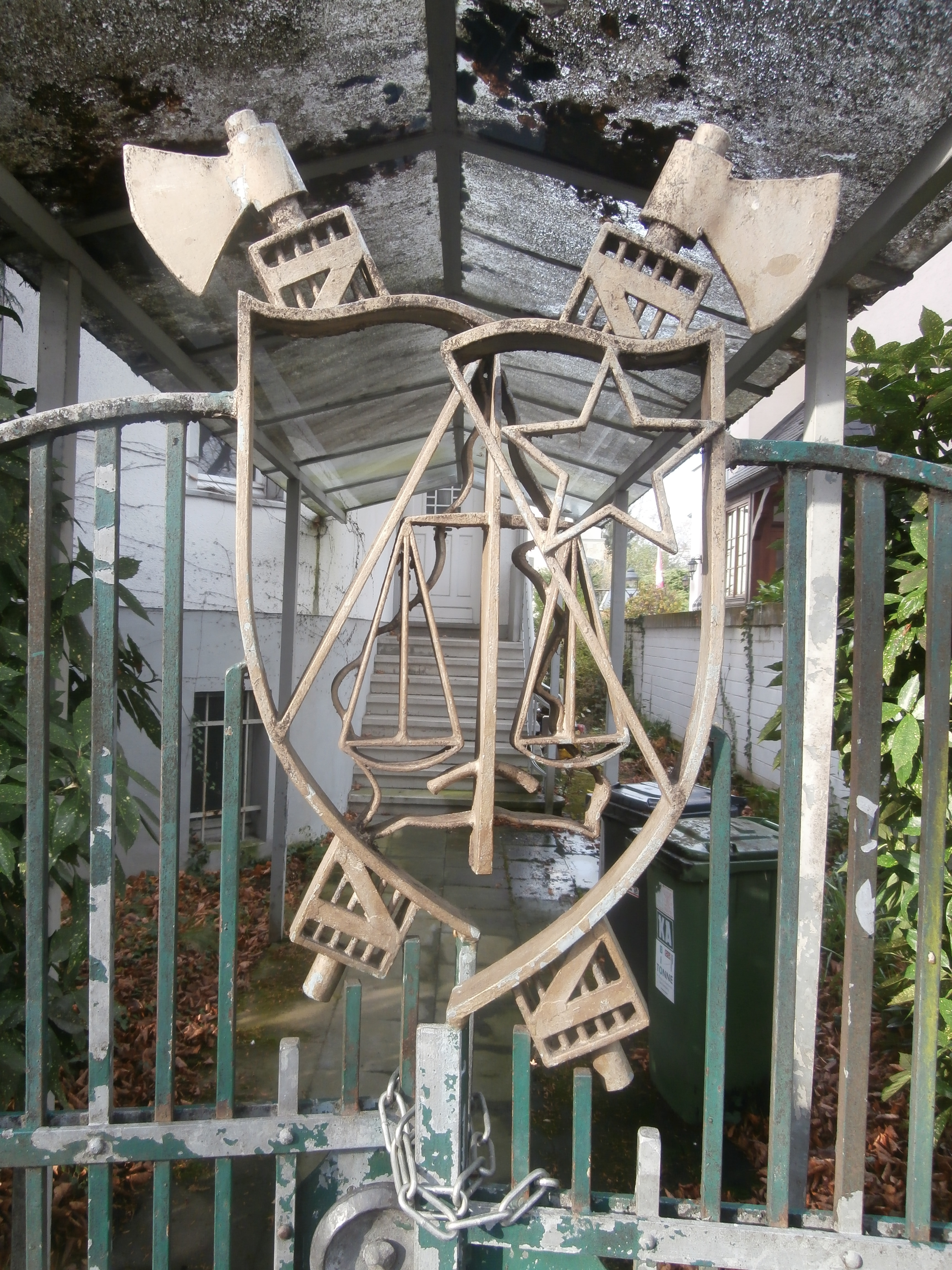
The 1975–86 arms of Cameroon depicted on the gates of the former Cameroonian embassy, Bonn, Germany.

The constitution of Cameroon describes the coat of arms as follows:

The coat of arms of the Republic of Cameroon shall be an escutcheon surmounted chief by the legend "Republic of Cameroon" and supported by two crossed fasces with the motto "Peace-Work-Fatherland" base.

The escutcheon shall be composed of a star on a field [vert] and triangle gules, charged with the geographical outline of Cameroon azure, and surcharged with the sword and scales of justice sable.

The previous version of the state arms had text in French only, with "République du Cameroun – 1er Janvier 1960" on a scroll above the shield, and "Paix, Travail, Patrie" below the shield. The shield differed in that the green and yellow areas to left and right each had one large blue five-pointed star, while the central red area did not have a star on top (so that the blue map outline of Cameroon extended higher).

== Historic coats of arms ==
=== Colonial era ===
In 1914, the German government decided to assign coats of arms to its overseas colonies, including Cameroon. Arms were designed, but World War I broke out before the project was finalised, and the arms were never actually taken into use. Giving the colonies their own insignia in time of war could let them have a symbol to rally around in case of rebellion. The arms proposed for the Imperial Colony of Cameroon depicted an elephant's head and the German imperial eagle on a chief. The eagle and the imperial crown on the shield was the same for all the proposed colonial arms.

Proposed coat of arms of German Cameroon (1914)

Seal of French Cameroon (1916–1960)

Badge of British Cameroons (1922–1961)

=== Post-independence ===
Coats of arms

Coat of arms of Cameroon (1960–1961)

Coat of arms of Cameroon (1961–1975)

Coat of arms of Cameroon (1975–1986)

Seals

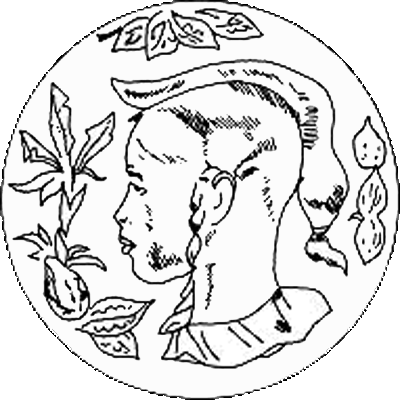
Seal of Cameroon

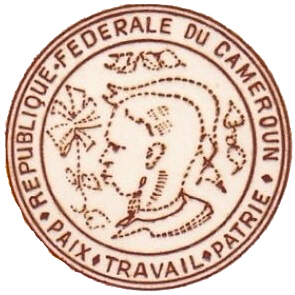
Seal of the Federal Republic of Cameroon

Seal of the Republic of Cameroon

== See also ==
- Flag of Cameroon
- Coats of arms of German colonies
