= 2020 Cameroonian parliamentary election =

- 9 February 2020
- All 180 seats in the National Assembly; 91 seats needed for a majority
Party	Leader	Seats	+/–
RDPC	Paul Biya	139	−9
UNDP	Bello Bouba Maigari	7	+2
SDF	John Fru Ndi	5	−13
PCRN	Cabral Libii	5	New
UDC	Adamou Ndam Njoya	4	0
FSNC	Issa Tchiroma	3	+3
MDR	Dakolé Daïssala	2	+1
UMS	Pierre Kwemo	2	New
This lists parties that won seats. See the complete results below.
Prime Minister before	Prime Minister after
Joseph Ngute; RDPC	Joseph Ngute; RDPC

Parliamentary elections were held in Cameroon on 9 February 2020, together with municipal elections. The Cameroon People's Democratic Movement retained its majority in parliament, winning 139 of the 167 seats decided on election day.

== Background ==
The elections had originally been scheduled for 2018. However, in June 2018 President Paul Biya sent a letter to leader of the Senate seeking to delay the elections until October 2019. On 2 July 2019 parliament voted to extend its mandate by twelve months. Ahead of that date the following June, documents leaked on social media purporting to show Biya's negotiations with parliamentary leaders to further delay parliamentary elections to coincide with municipal elections in February 2020. The ongoing Anglophone Crisis dominated the process, with supporters of Ambazonia calling for a boycott of the election. Ensuing violence resulted in a low turnout in the Northwest Region and Southwest Region, with separatists claiming that 98 percent of eligible voters had boycotted the election.

== Electoral system ==
The 180 members of the National Assembly are elected from 58 single- and multi-member constituencies based on the departments.

Most members were elected in multi-member constituencies, using a modified form of closed list proportional representation. A party receiving more than half of the vote in a district won all the seats. If no party received over 50% of the district vote, the party with the most votes was awarded half the seats and any other party receiving over 5% of the vote received a proportional share of the remaining half of the seats based on the largest remainder method and Hare quota.

A relative few were elected in single-member districts, where first-past-the-post voting was used.

== Results ==
Party	Votes	%	Seats	+/–
Cameroon People's Democratic Movement			139	−9
National Union for Democracy and Progress			7	+2
Social Democratic Front			5	−13
Cameroonian Party for National Reconciliation			5	New
Cameroon Democratic Union			4	0
Front for the National Salvation of Cameroon			3	+3
Movement for the Defence of the Republic			2	+1
Union of Socialist Movements			2	New
Other parties			0	–
Vacant			13	–
Total			180	0
Valid votes	2,942,194	97.36		
Invalid/blank votes	79,753	2.64		
Total votes	3,021,947	100.00		
Registered voters/turnout	6,900,928	43.79		
Source: Koaci, IPU
