= Cabral Libii =

Cameroonian politician and journalist

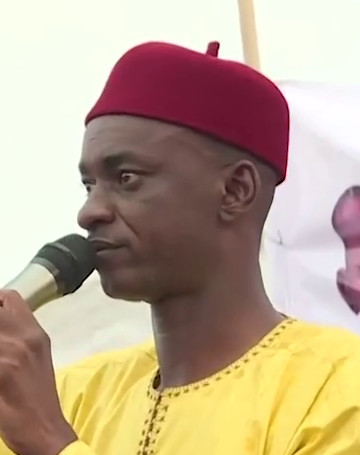
- Cabral Libii in 2018

President of the Cameroonian Party for National Reconciliation
- Incumbent
- Assumed office 11 May 2019
- Preceded by: Robert Kona

Member of the National Assembly for Nyong-et-Kéllé
- Incumbent
- Assumed office February 2020

Personal details
- Born: Cabral Libii Li Ngué Ngué; 29 March 1980 (age 46) Ekoamaen, Centre Region, Cameroon
- Party: PCRN
- Spouse: Murielle Peggy Libii
- Education: University of Yaoundé II
- Occupation: Politician, jurist, journalist

Cabral Libii Li Ngué (born 29 March 1980), often known as simply Cabral Libii, is a journalist, law instructor, and Member of Parliament in the National Assembly of Cameroon, elected in February 2020.

== Early life and education ==
Cabral Libii was born in 1980 in Ekoamaen (Centre Region, Cameroon), to Paul Ngué Ngué. He is a twin, but his twin sister did not survive.

As a law student at the University of Yaoundé II, Cabral Libii was a political editorialist and administrative contractor at the University of Yaoundé II. He served as the director of Radio Campus and hosted television programs, including Vox Live on VoxAfrica.

== Political career ==
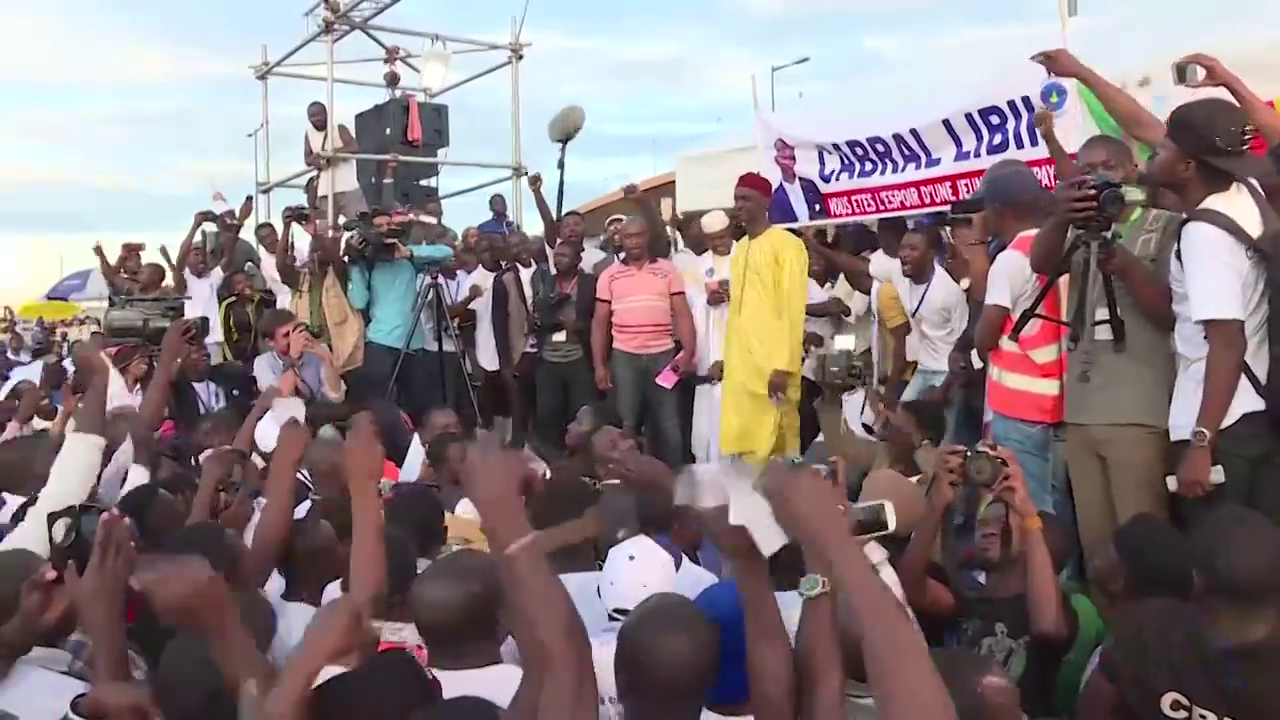
Cabral Libii's final meeting before the 2018 presidential election, in Yaoundé on 6 October 2018.

Libii consistently criticizes the Cameroonian Electoral Code, which allows Paul Biya to run for the presidency repeatedly.

He was first nominated for the presidential election at the age of 38 in 2018, becoming the youngest candidate, backed by the Univers Party and mentored by Professor Prosper Nkou Mvondo. He finished third out of seven candidates. In 2017, he declared his candidacy for the 2018 Cameroonian presidential election. He launched a groundbreaking campaign titled "11 million voters," asserting: "Thousands of my compatriots have called on me to lead their destinies. This authentic 'call of the people' honors me. I feel the weight of the responsibility of being elected by hearts and reason. I humbly feel the triumph of new ideas and new men in the upcoming challenges. Thank you all humbly. The electoral goal by January 1, 2018, is to have a body of at least 11 million registered voters. Let's get to work."

He officially received 6.28% of the votes in the presidential election.

In December 2019, he announced his election as the chairman of the Board of Risius Holding, a multinational specializing in Agribusiness-Import-Export, with its headquarters in Abidjan, Côte d'Ivoire. Soon after, some of the revelations, by letter, informed the Minister of Territorial Administration, Paul Atanga Nji, of Cabral Libii's exclusion from said political party.

Appointed as the head of the Cameroonian Party for National Reconciliation (PCRN) in 2019, Cabral Libii was subsequently elected as a member of the National Assembly of Cameroon during the dual municipal and legislative elections in Cameroon on 9 February 2020, along with four of his colleagues.

He was elected African politician of the year 2019 at the Gold Gifa in Paris on 4 May 2021.

On 17 March 2020, he was officially elected secretary to the bureau of the National Assembly of Cameroon. His political party, the PCRN, also secured seven municipalities and seats in other municipalities, totaling 210 municipal councilors, a performance that ranks this party as the second political party with elected officials in both the Northern and Southern parts of Cameroon.

In 2021, he published a book presenting his political ideology titled: "Community Federalism." The mere title of the book, even before its publication, had sparked fierce criticism from his political opponents. However, the actual publication of the book has mitigated the criticisms and led to a more structured debate on the form of the state.

On 28 March 2024, Robert Kona, founding member of the Cameroon Party for National Reconciliation (PCRN), by letter, informed the Minister of Territorial Administration, Paul Atanga Nji, of Cabral Libii's exclusion from said political party.

On 2 April 2024, he attended the Inauguration of Bassirou Diomaye Faye in Senegal.

In September 2024, he said he would run for the 2025 presidential election.

In May 2025, the political bureau of the PCRN chose Cabral Libii for his candidacy in the presidential election of October 2025. He placed third out of ten candidates with 3.4% of the vote, behind Paul Biya and Issa Tchiroma. He conceded defeat on October 27th and congratulated Paul Biya.
