= 2020 Cameroonian municipal elections =

The 2020 Cameroonian municipal elections were held place on 9 February 2020, together with parliamentary elections, The elections saw seats elected for more than 10,000 municipal councilors in 360 communes across Cameroon.
