= Parliament of Cameroon =

Legislature of Cameroon

Parliament Parlement

Type
- Type: Bicameral
- Houses: Senate; National Assembly

Leadership
- Speaker of Senate: Aboubakary Abdoulaye
- Speaker of the National Assembly: Théodore Datouo
- Seats: 280

Meeting place
- Yaoundé

The Parliament of Cameroon (French: Parlement du Cameroun) is the legislature of Cameroon. A bicameral body, it consists of the Senate and the National Assembly. The parliament is composed of 280 members, 180 MPs and 100 senators.
