= Cameroon National Salvation Front =

Cameroon National Salvation Front Front pour le salut national du Cameroun
- Abbreviation: FSNC
- Leader: Issa Tchiroma
- Founded: 2007
- Split from: National Union for Democracy and Progress
- Headquarters: Yaounde
- Ideology: Economic liberalism
- Political position: Centre
- Colors: Brown
- Slogan: Love - Labour - Justice
- National Assembly: 3 / 180
- Senate: 1 / 100

Website
- fsnc.cm

The Cameroon National Salvation Front, abbreviated as CNSF (in French: Front pour le salut national du Cameroun), is a political party in Cameroon.

It is chaired by Issa Tchiroma Bakary, until 2025 Minister of Employment and Cultural Training and former member of the National Union for Democracy and Progress (UNDP), since the party's creation in 2007.

== Election results ==
=== Presidential elections ===
Election	Party candidate	Votes	%	Result
2025	Issa Tchiroma	1,622,334	35.19%	Lost ✗

=== National Assembly elections ===
Year	Votes	%	Rank	Seats
2013	28 339	0,70	9th	0 / 180
2020	—			3 / 180

=== Senate elections ===
Year	Votes	%	Rank	Seats
2018	75	0.76	6th	0 / 70
2023	124	1.15	5th	0 / 70
