= Issa Tchiroma =

Cameroonian politician (born 1946)

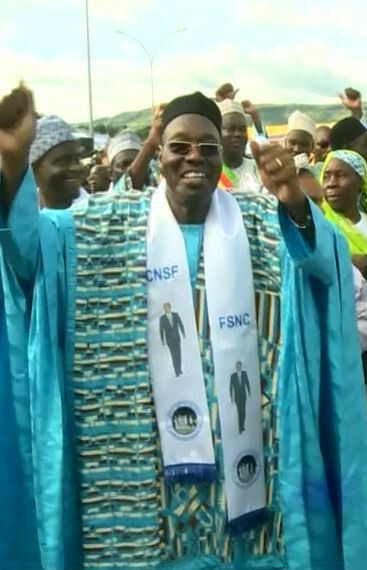
- Tchiroma in 2018

President of the Cameroon National Salvation Front
- Incumbent
- Assumed office 2007
- Preceded by: Office established

Minister of Employment and Vocational Training
- In office 4 January 2019 – 24 June 2025
- Prime Minister: Joseph Ngute
- Preceded by: Zacharie Perevet
- Succeeded by: Mounouna Foutsou (acting)

Minister of Communication
- In office 30 June 2009 – 4 January 2019
- Prime Minister: Philémon Yang
- Preceded by: Jean Pierre Biyiti bi Essam
- Succeeded by: René Sadi Emma

Minister of Transport
- In office 29 November 1992 – 19 September 1996
- Prime Minister: Simon Achidi Achu
- Preceded by: Jean-Baptiste Bokam
- Succeeded by: Joseph Tsanga Abanda

Member of the National Assembly
- Incumbent
- Assumed office 31 March 1992

Personal details
- Born: Issa Tchiroma Bakary; 10 September 1946 (age 79) or 1949 or 1950 (age 76–77) Garoua, Cameroon
- Party: FSNC (since 2007)
- Other political affiliations: UNDP (before 2007)
- Spouse: Aminata Müller
- Profession: Railway engineer

Issa Tchiroma Bakary (born 10 September 1946 or 1949/1950) is a Cameroonian politician. A former railway engineer, he served as Minister of Employment and Vocational Training from 2019 to 2025. He previously served under President Paul Biya as the Minister of Communication from 2009 to 2019 and Minister of Transport from 1992 to 1996.

Born in Garoua, Tchiroma went to France to do technical training in transport and materials. After completing his training, Tchiroma returned to Cameroon and worked as a materials and construction engineer at Regifercam (the National Railway Corporation) in Douala. In 1984, following a failed coup that year, Tchiroma was arrested by the Cameroonian government due to his alleged involvement even though Tchiroma wasn't directly involved in the coup.

In 1990, Tchiroma was released and two years later in 1992, he participated in the first ever multi-party elections held that year and was elected to the National Assembly as a member of the UNDP. Later that year, the UNDP joined the government as the ruling party, the Cameroon People's Democratic Movement (CPDM), lost its majority. Tchiroma was one of the few UNDP members to be a part of the government was appointed Minister of Transport by President Paul Biya despite some backlash from some members of Biya's party. Tchiroma served in this role until 1996.

In 2007, Tchiroma left the UNDP and formed the Front for the National Salvation (FNSC) and became its president. Two years later in 2009, he was appointed Minister of Communication in the cabinet of Prime Minister Philémon Yang. Tchiroma served in this role until 2019 where he was appointed the Minister of Employment and Vocational Training, a role Tchiroma served until in June 2025 where he unexpectedly broke ties with President Biya and left the government. He resigned from his post in the government and Tchiroma and his party joined the opposition and where he announced his candidacy and took part in the 2025 presidential election. Biya won by a large margin and Tchiroma thereafter fled the country, claiming for fear for his safety.

== Personal life ==
Tchiroma studied in France and became a materials and construction engineer. Working in Douala, Tchiroma was a Research Officer at the Cameroon Railways Camrail (Regie des Chemins de Fer, Regifercam), the state railway company of Cameroon, until April 1984. When soldiers attempted to overthrow President Paul Biya in a coup attempt on 6 April 1984, sparking days of fighting in Yaoundé, Tchiroma was in Douala. According to Tchiroma, he was uninvolved in the coup attempt and the violence was as mysterious to him as it was to others at the time; he said that he observed the gloomy atmosphere that prevailed in the city and noted the general lack of reliable information about what was occurring in Yaoundé.

The coup was foiled by loyalist troops, and the government arrested the supposed perpetrators. Tchiroma, being from the North, one of the regions that are purported to be a stronghold of the supposed coup plotters, was amongst the ones under suspicion. After several searches and damages to his home, he was arrested on April 16, 1984. Despite no charges being brought against him, Tchiroma was imprisoned first at Kondengui prison, then transferred to Yoko prison, where he endured lengthy detention under harsh conditions denounced by Amnesty International. During his years in detention, Tchiroma, a French-speaking Cameroonian, taught himself English. After more than six years, he was released in 1990.

== Political career ==
Following Tchiroma's release, he participated in a protest in Garoua against the actions of those who, in his view, were impeding the implementation of the law providing amnesty to individuals implicated in the 1984 coup attempt. He was then arrested and jailed again. According to Tchiroma, his arrest provoked anger among northerners, and he credited Edgar Alain Mebe Ngo'o, the Secretary-General of North Province, with securing his release in order to defuse the situation.

Tchiroma was Secretary-General of the National Union for Democracy and Progress (UNDP), an opposition party, in the early 1990s. In the March 1992 parliamentary election, he was elected to the National Assembly as a UNDP candidate in the Bénoué constituency of North Province. Later in the year, after Biya controversially won the October 1992 presidential election, Tchiroma was appointed to the government as Minister of Transport by Biya on 27 November 1992, along with another UNDP leader, Hamadou Moustapha. He and Moustapha accepted their appointments without the approval of UNDP President Maigari Bello Bouba; the appointments were viewed by some as a way of dividing and weakening the opposition by coopting certain opposition figures.

After Tchiroma and Moustapha were retained in their posts as part of the government named in July 1994, Bello Bouba said on 23 July 1994 that their continued inclusion in the government would mean the end of their membership in the UNDP. Tchiroma and Moustapha challenged their removal from the party, but they were expelled by the UNDP Central Committee in January 1995. Following their expulsion, Tchiroma and Moustapha established their own "authentic" faction of the UNDP, rejecting Bello Bouba's leadership. That faction then became the National Alliance for Democracy and Progress (NADP), a new party featuring a slight alteration of the UNDP's name, and it was legally recognized on 31 August 1995. Despite their creation of a new party, Moustapha and Tchiroma still legally contested Bello Bouba's leadership of the UNDP.

In 1996, while serving as Minister of Transport, Tchiroma urged companies in the United States to invest in Cameroon, saying that the country could not develop without foreign investment. He departed the government on 19 September 1996, when Joseph Tsanga Abanda was appointed to replace him as Minister of Transport.

== Return to the UNDP and creation of the FSNC ==
Tchiroma ultimately left the ANDP and rejoined the UNDP at a January 2002 party congress in Maroua. Following the June 2002 parliamentary election, Tchiroma and four other notable northern politicians released a statement in July, in which they alleged electoral fraud and announced the formation of a "resistance front". They warned that the governing Cameroon People's Democratic Movement (RDPC) was moving the country back to single-party rule and called on politicians "to transcend any divergence, selfishness and personal ambition in order to create a movement capable of saving Cameroon from collapse". He also joined other northern politicians in signing a September 2002 memo decrying the government's alleged marginalization and neglect of the north and urging that more attention be paid to addressing the north's problems.

At the time of the October 2004 presidential election, Tchiroma was part of the opposition coalition and denounced President Biya, urging the people to vote him out. He took that stance even though Bello Bouba and the UNDP leadership chose to support Biya's candidacy. Tchiroma headed a panel that was tasked with choosing a joint opposition candidate for the election, which would have improved the opposition's chances of defeating Biya. The panel chose Adamou Ndam Njoya, the President of the Cameroon Democratic Union (UDC), as the joint opposition candidate; however, John Fru Ndi, the Chairman of the Social Democratic Front (SDF), reacted angrily to the decision, saying that the selection process was improper and that he would stand as a candidate despite the panel's decision. Tchiroma in turn criticized Fru Ndi: "The rules to which all of us willingly subscribed, including him, were respected. If he were the democrat he claims to be, he should simply bow down to the will of the majority." With Ndam Njoya and Fru Ndi both standing and thereby splitting the opposition vote, a victory for Biya was considered to be almost certain.

Tchiroma later left the UNDP again and founded a new party, the Front for the National Salvation of Cameroon (FSNC), which was officially registered in January 2007. At the time, he said that the FSNC "intends to contribute to the advent of a free society and promote the democratisation process in Cameroon".

At a press conference on 20 February 2008, he announced his party's support for constitutional amendments favored by the government, including the elimination of presidential term limits. Although other opposition leaders viewed the amendments as a transparent effort to allow Paul Biya to remain in power, Tchiroma argued that the amendments should be considered on their own merits. He particularly stressed his support for extending the 45-day period for organizing a new presidential election following a vacancy in the office, arguing that it was "almost impossible" to do so within that length of time. He also argued that removing the presidential term limits would promote a climate of peace and stability by avoiding the uncertainty associated with a presidential succession, and he said that would in turn encourage foreign investment in Cameroon. On the same occasion, Tchiroma criticized other opposition leaders, saying that they were power-hungry and would be willing to start a civil war, while also denying that he had been bribed into supporting the amendments; according to Tchiroma, he considered the arguments of both sides, consulted constitutional experts, and then concluded that the ruling party's position was correct.

In an interview published by the Cameroon Tribune on 29 June 2009, Tchiroma defended President Biya in the midst of media claims about his wealth and argued that Biya was working to "eradicate corruption". He also alleged that foreign agents were working to destabilize Cameroon.

== Minister of Communication ==
President Biya appointed Tchiroma to the government as Minister of Communication on 30 June 2009. According to Tchiroma, he learned of his appointment when someone who had just heard the announcement called him to tell him to turn on the radio. He said that he initially took it as a joke and that he was very happy when he learned it was true, while stressing that "the responsibility and challenge is enormous". He took up his post on 1 July 2009.

On 17 August 2009, Tchiroma announced that he had ordered the closure of Sky One Radio due to "multiple infringements of laws governing communications in Cameroon". According to the government, the station was trying to solve social problems through its Le Tribunal program and thereby supersede the Ministry of Social Services. Tchiroma said that he had tried three times to reach an agreement with the station management, but was unsuccessful; he added that the station would be reopened if the management "promises to respect the code of ethics and the ministry's specifications".

When President Biya took an expensive vacation in France in September 2009, the vacation's cost generated some anger, but Tchiroma argued that Biya, "like any other worker ... has a right to his vacations" and that in taking vacations he was free to use "the means put at his disposal by the sovereign people ... to provide his needs".

The journalist Bibi Ngota, who was arrested on charges of fraud on 10 March 2010, died at Kondengui prison in April 2010. Tchiroma said that Ngota had been HIV positive and that he had died due to infections that had "overwhelmed" his weakened immune system, despite the best efforts of prison doctors. However, some expressed skepticism regarding the official version of events, claiming that Ngota had not received treatment. Ngota's brother was angered by Tchiroma's explanation and said that he was lying.

As Cameroon held celebrations marking its 50th year of independence from France in May 2010, Tchiroma acknowledged in an interview that "Cameroon has suffered from poor governance, mismanagement and corruption", while arguing that the country was making progress under President Biya. He noted that a high level of peace and stability had been preserved in Cameroon, in contrast to many other African nations. Regarding the controversy surrounding Ngota's death and allegations that he was tortured in hopes of extracting information on his sources, Tchiroma described the journalist as a "rascal" but insisted that Ngota was not subjected to torture and that his arrest had not been politically motivated.

On 21 June 2010, Tchiroma announced the news that the wreckage of a missing plane carrying the Australian businessman Ken Talbot and the rest of the board of the mining company Sundance Resources had been found in Congo-Brazzaville following an extensive search. The plane had taken off in Yaoundé and was travelling to the Congolese town of Yangadou, when all 11 people on board apparently died in the crash.

After a gay Cameroonian man was granted asylum in the United Kingdom due to his sexuality, Tchiroma said in July 2010 that, although homosexuality was illegal in Cameroon, homosexuals were not prosecuted for their private activities. He dismissed the asylum-seeker's claims, arguing that the man had nothing to fear from the law.

Tchiroma stated on 20 April 2017 that Biya had ordered the restoration of internet service in Anglophone parts of Cameroon, where it had been cut off in January 2017 due to unrest. Tchiroma said that the denial of internet service was no longer necessary because the situation in the Anglophone regions had largely returned to normal.

=== Minister of Employment and Vocational Training, 2019–2025 ===
Tchiroma also served as Minister of Employment and Vocational Training, overseeing the construction of several training centers in partnership with France, South Korea, the World Bank, and the African Development Bank (AfDB). He pushed for a law requiring foreign companies to contribute to the training of young Cameroonians. The cost of vocational training was also lowered to 50,000 FCFA annually so that the training became more accessible to a wider portion of the population.

A strong figure in the government, Tchiroma grew disillusioned with the weakening of leadership, the centralization of power, the despair of the youth, and the stagnation of the state. The absence of cabinet meetings for over a decade was said to further solidified his belief that it was time to break away. In June 2025, he publicly announced his resignation from the government.

=== 2025 presidential candidacy ===
On 25 June 2025, Tchiroma officially announced his candidacy for the 2025 presidential election, with the slogan "Le peuple au pouvoir / We are the power". In an open letter to the Cameroonian people, he stated his intention to break with a government he believes has run out of steam after 43 years of unbroken rule by President Biya. After voting was held on 12 October, Tchiroma proclaimed himself the winner despite official results not having been released yet. He was supported by the Human right's lawyer Alice Nkom. Following violent protests over Biya's reelection and subsequent inauguration, Tchiroma fled to the Gambia due to safety concerns on 7 November and was granted asylum.
