= National Assembly (Cameroon) =

Lower house of the Parliament of Cameroon

Coordinates: 3.857429°N 11.509394°E

National Assembly Assemblée nationale
- 10th Legislature

Type
- Type: Lower house Unicameral (1960–2013)

History
- Founded: 10 April 1960 (65 years ago)

Leadership
- President: Théodore Datouo, CPDM since 17 March 2026

Structure
- Seats: 180 members
- Political groups: Government (152): CPDM (152); Opposition (28): UNDP (7); SDF (5); CPNR (5); UDC (4); FNSC (3); MDR (2); USM (2)
- Length of term: 5 years

Elections
- Voting system: Mixed electoral system
- First election: 24 April 1964
- Last election: 9 February 2020
- Next election: 2026

Meeting place
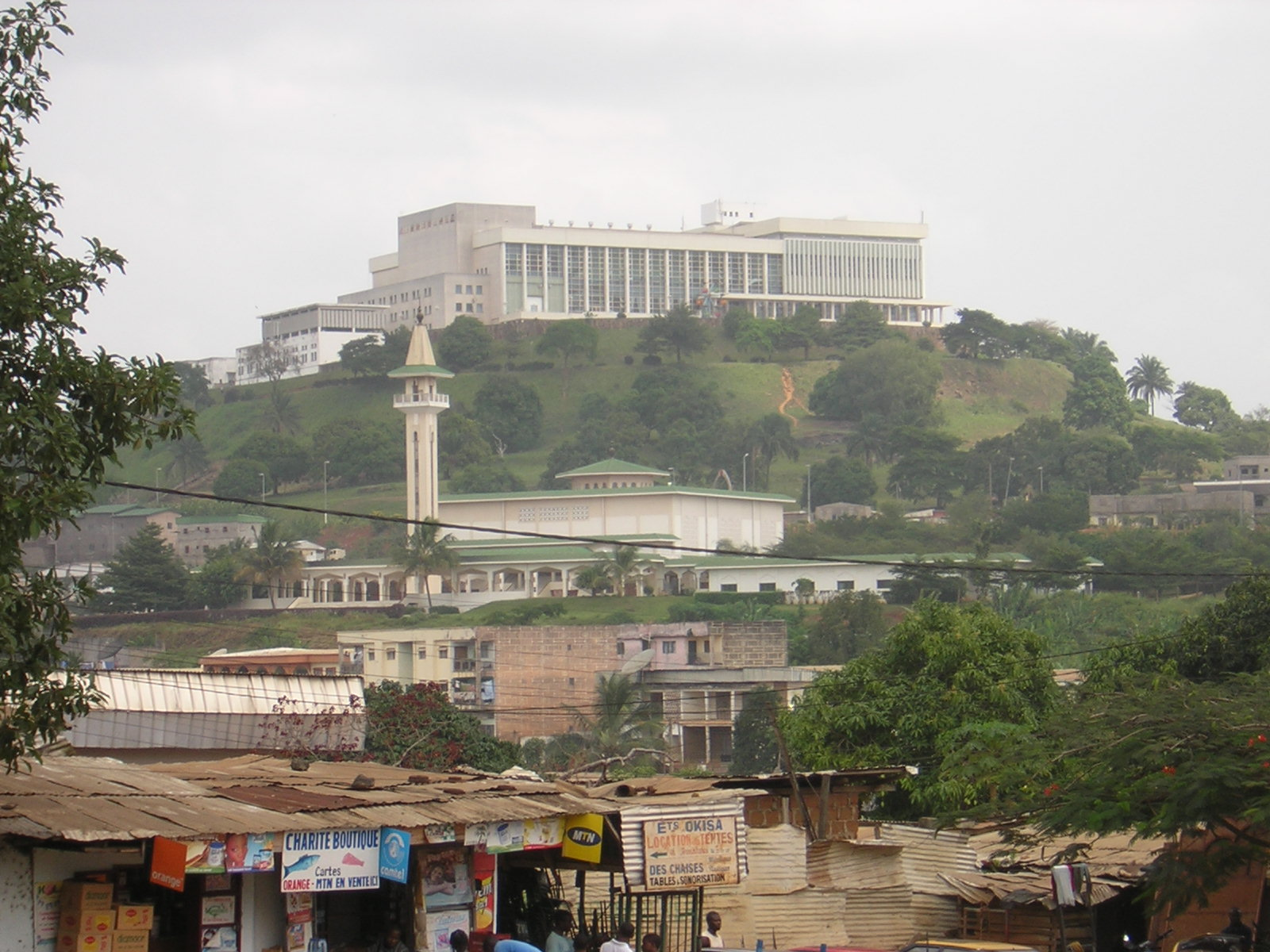
- Palace of Congress, Yaoundé

Website
- http://www.assnat.cm

Rules
- Standing Orders of the National Assembly (English)

The National Assembly (French: Assemblée Nationale) is the lower house of the Parliament of Cameroon. It has 180 members, elected for five-year terms in 49 single and multi-seat constituencies. Together with the Senate, it constitutes the legislative arm of government.

Although multiparty elections have been held since 1992, the Cameroon People's Democratic Movement (RDPC), the ruling party since independence, has always retained control of the National Assembly. The Cameroonian political system invests overwhelming power in the hands of the President of the Republic, Paul Biya, and the RDPC exists essentially to support Biya and his policies. As a result, for most of Cameroon's history since independence, the National Assembly has done little more than approve the President's policies.

From 1992 to 1997, the RDPC relied on alliances with two smaller parties to secure a parliamentary majority. This has been the only period since independence that saw any meaningful opposition to presidential decisions. Beginning in 1997, the RDPC has won an outright majority in each election; its majorities have consistently improved as the opposition has weakened. Prior to 2013 and the creation of the Senate, the National Assembly was a unicameral chamber.

== 2008 constitutional changes ==
On 10 April 2008, the National Assembly overwhelmingly voted a bill to change the Constitution of Cameroon to provide the President of the Republic with immunity from prosecution for official acts and to allow him to run for an unlimited number of seven-year terms (it was previously limited to two terms) along with a number of other changes. The changes took place after a walk-out of the National Assembly by the opposition SDF representatives and just one month after widespread violence resulting in dozens of deaths and hundreds of arrests protesting price rises and the proposed constitutional changes. Five members of parliament voted against the bill. Opposition lawmakers and at least one deputy from the ruling RDPC, Paul Abine Ayah, criticised the bill as a setback for democracy and the country in general.

== See also ==
- List of presidents of the National Assembly of Cameroon
- Politics of Cameroon
- List of legislatures by country
