= Biya (disambiguation) =

Biya may refer to:

== Places ==
- Biya (river), a tributary of the Ob in Siberia, Russia;
- Al Hoceima or Biya, a Moroccan port on the Mediterranean Sea;

== People ==
- Paul Biya (born 1933), president of Cameroon 1982–present
  - Jeanne-Irène Biya (1935–1992), first wife of Paul Biya
  - Chantal Biya (born 1969), second wife of Paul Biya
  - Brenda Biya, Cameroonian activist, rapper, and entrepreneur; daughter of Paul and Chantal
  - Franck Biya, Cameroonian businessman and entrepreneur; son of Paul
- Bisola Biya, Nigerian-Canadian author
- Biya Simbassa, Ethiopian-born American runner
- Syed Ibrahim Malik Biya (c.1315–1351), general for Muhammad bin Tughluq, northern India

== Other ==
- Grand Prix Chantal Biya, a professional bicycle road race in Cameroon
- Biya (also spelled Bia), a Filipino name for the Long-finned goby
