= Koko Ateba =

Cameroonian singer and guitarist (died 2024)

- Born: 9 December 1959; Zoétélé, Cameroon
- Died: 13 December 2024; Suresnes, France
- Occupations: Singer, guitarist

Koko Ateba (died 13 December 2024) was a Cameroonian singer and guitarist.

== Life and career ==
Born in Zoétélé, Ateba was inspired by Elvis Kemayo. During her professional development, she was accompanied by sound engineer Ambroise Voundi and musician Sade Gide. She was a multilingual artist and mastered the art of acoustic guitar. She sang in French, English, Ewondo, and Cameroonian Pidgin English. Her younger brother, Brice Ateba, followed in her musical footsteps.

Ateba released her first album, titled Talk Talk in 1986, which mixed elements of bikutsi, folk, and jazz. In 1988, she was invited to the Presidential Palace in Yaoundé and performed the song "Atemengue", which dealt with issues of female infertility. However, she was wrongfully accused of mocking the First Lady Jeanne-Irène Biya and was imprisoned and exiled. She later received an unofficial apology from President Paul Biya, but moved to France and signed with producer Jean Pierre Castellin. She then appeared on the TV series Frou-frou, hosted by Christine Bravo. In 2010, she returned to Cameroon for the 50th anniversary of the country's independence, once again performing for the top authorities of the country.

== Death ==
Ateba died in Suresnes on 13 December 2024.

== Discography ==
=== Albums ===
- Koko Ateba (1986)
- Koko Ateba (1993)

=== Songs ===
- "Si t'es mal dans ta peau" (1982)
- "Frou-Frou" (1993)
- "Si Jeu" (1993)
- "Taxi" (1993)
- "Laisse-moi en toi" (1994)
