= Bisola =

Surname

Bísólá
- Gender: Unisex
- Language: Yoruba

Origin
- Origin: Nigerian
- Meaning: Born into affluence
- Region of origin: South West, Nigeria

Other names
- Variant forms: Abísólá, Abiola, Biola

Bísólá audio (spelt as Bísólá) is a Nigerian unisex given name of Yoruba origin which means "born into affluence". Bísólá once exclusively feminine, is now being adopted by males, reflecting shifting societal norms and the growing trend of unisex names. It is a diminutive form of Abísólá.

== Notable people with the name ==
- Bisola Aiyeola (born 1986), Nigerian actress and singer
- Bisola Biya (born 1992), Nigerian author
- Bisola Makanjuola (born 1996), Nigerian freestyle wrestler
- Bisola Ojikutu, American infectious disease specialist
- Ahmed Fatimah Bisola, Nigerian politician
