= Rosette Ndongo Mengolo =

Cameroonian politician (c. 1954–2014)

Rosette Mengolo

Mayor of Bangou
- In office 2007 – 2 October 2014

Personal details
- Born: Rosette Marie Ndongo Mengolo c. 1954 Cameroon, France
- Died: October 2, 2014 (aged 59–60) Johannesburg, Gauteng, South Africa
- Spouse: Georges Vigouroux
- Children: Chantal
- Occupation: former beauty queen
- Known for: Miss Bertoua 1967 mother of the First Lady of Cameroon

Rosette Marie Ndongo (née Mengolo c. 1954 – October 2, 2014) was a Cameroonian public figure, beauty queen and politician. She served as mayor of Bangou from 2007 until her death and was the mother of Cameroon’s First Lady, Chantal Biya.

== Biography ==
She was originally from East Province, Cameroon, and in 1967 won the titles of Miss Bertoua and Queen of Beauty in the East.

She gave birth to Chantal Pulchérie Vigouroux in Dimako, and was married to a French expatriate Georges Vigouroux.

=== Political career ===
In 2007, Rosette Ndongo Mengolo was elected mayor of Bangou, a municipality in Cameroon’s West Region. She was re-elected in 2013 and served until her death in 2014. In August 2008, she received the Grand Prize for National Integration, a gold trophy symbolizing Cameroon, at the Palais des Congrès de Yaoundé by the Fondation Afrique Excellence (FAE).

She died on October 2, 2014, and was buried in Mvomeka'a, where the funeral was organized.
