= Pol language =

Bantu language of Cameroon

Pol
- Native to: Cameroon, Central African Republic, Republic of Congo
- Native speakers: (44,000 Pol and Pomo cited 2000) (it may be that Kweso is counted under Kako)
- Language family: Niger–Congo?: Atlantic–Congo; Benue–Congo; Bantoid; Bantu (Zone A); Makaa–Njem + Kako (A.80–90); Kako; Pol
- Dialects: Pol; Pomo; Kweso

Language codes
- ISO 639-3: pmm
- Glottolog: pomo1271 Pol pomo1276 Pomo-Kweso
- Guthrie code: A.92

Pol is a Bantu language of Cameroon. Pol proper is spoken in central Cameroon; the Pomo and Kweso dialects are spoken in Congo and the CAR near the Cameroonian border.

== Demographics ==
Polri Asóm, the southernmost dialect of the Polri language in Bertoua commune, is found in Dimako commune, in proximity with Kwakum.

The Asóm claim to understand Kinda and vice versa. Kwakum speakers also claim to understand Polri Asóm.

Polri Asóm is spoken in nine villages: four to the east of Doumé (commune of Dimako, department of Haut-Nyong, Eastern Region) and five to the north of Bertoua (south of Pol Canton in the commune of Bélabo, department of Lom-et-Djerem, Eastern Region).

Polri Kinda is spoken in three villages: Mambaya to the north, as well as Mansa and Ona. The Asóm dialect should not be confused with the Asón dialect of Bébil.

Polri is also spoken in the Republic of Congo. In Cameroon, there 38,676 speakers.
