= Robert Nkili =

Cameroonian politician (born 1945)

Robert Nkili (born 7 June 1945 in Endom, Cameroon) is a Cameroonian politician. He was Minister of Labour from 2002 to 2011 and then Minister of Transport between 2011 and 2015. He was appointed senator for the central region on March 31, 2023 by the President of the Republic Paul Biya. He is the brother to the former First Lady of Cameroon Jeanne Iréne Biya, and Uncle to Franck Biya.

== Biography ==
=== Childhood and early life ===
Robert Nkili was born on July 6, 1945 in Endom, in the department of Nyong-et-Mfoumou. He is the younger brother of Jeanne-Irène Biya, first lady of Cameroon from 1982 to 1992. In 1984, he obtained a doctorate in History at the University of Aix-Marseille. His thesis is entitled Administrative and Political Power in the Northern Region of Cameroon under the French Period (1919-1960).

== Family ==
Etende Nkili Brigitte Laissa, daughter of Ro ERT Nkili died on Monday 17 February 2025.

=== Career ===
In 1990, Robert Nkili was Inspector General of Pedagogy at the Ministry of National Education of Cameroon. On 24 August 2002, he was appointed Minister of Employment, Labour and Social Security. On 8 December 2004, following the reshuffling of the government, he became Minister of Labour and Social Security. On 1 Jun 2011 Robert Nkili, was elected President of the 100th International Labour Conference.

On December 9, 2011, he was appointed Minister of Transport.

He left the government on 2 October 2015.

=== Politics ===
Robert Nkili is an activist of the Cameroon People's Democratic Movement (CPDM). He is a full member of the central committee. He was appointed Senator of the department of Nyong-et-Mfoumou on 31 March 2023.

== Controversies and criticisms ==
He faced significant challenges during his tenure as Minister of Transport, especially with the acquisition of two MA-60 aircraft for Cameroon’s national airline, Camair-Co. Public outrage sparked over claims of financial mismanagement and insufficient transparency in the procurement process, holding Nkili responsible for the project’s shortcomings. He is tried by the Special Criminal Court on his management of the case for the purchase of two MA-60 aircraft for the national airline Camair-Co. An investigation had been requested by SDF deputies in 2015 to shed light on a surplus of more than 20 billion CFA francs observed in the acquisition of these two aircraft, which would have been bought at 34.4 billion CFA francs while they cost only 5.6 billion CFA francs each on the market.
