= Bertrand Teyou =

Cameroonian author (1969–2020)

Bertrand Zepherin Teyou
- Born: 17 March 1969; Douala, Cameroon
- Died: 22 January 2020 (aged 50); Douala
- Occupation: Author
- Known for: 2010-11 imprisonment

Bertrand Zepherin Teyou (March 17, 1969 - January 22, 2020) was a Cameroonian author.

== Book and arrest ==
Teyou is notable for his book La Belle de la république bananière : Chantal Biya, de la rue au palais (English: "The Beauty of the Banana Republic: Chantal Biya, from the Streets to the Palace"), where he traces Mrs. Biya's rise from ordinary origins to become the First Lady of Cameroon. He was imprisoned on charges of insulting Chantal Biya, the wife of President Paul Biya in his book and for trying to hold a public reading of this book.

On 3 November 2010, Teyou was arrested at a hotel in Douala where he had organized a book signing; copies of his book were seized and destroyed. On 10 November, he was tried by the High Court (Tribunal de première instance) in Douala and found guilty of "insult to character" and organizing an "illegal demonstration". The court sentenced him to two years’ imprisonment or a fine of 2,030,150 CFA francs (approximately 4,425 US dollars). Because he could not pay the fine, he began serving his sentence in New Bell Prison in Douala.

The Writers in Prison Committee of International PEN protested his trial and called for his immediate release. Amnesty International considered him to be a prisoner of conscience.

== Hunger strike, imprisonment and release ==
In February 2011, Teyou went on hunger strike to protest conditions in New Bell. On 8 March 2011, Le Jour reported that Teyou had been hospitalized. Amnesty International also issued an "Urgent Action" over concerns for his declining health, stating, "He is said to suffer from heavy bleeding caused by acute haemorrhoids, reportedly exacerbated by poor prison diet. Overcrowding is a problem in Cameroonian prisons and the food is known to be of poor quality and inadequate." Amnesty International had previously described general conditions at New Bell as "often life-threatening".

In a March 2011 interview, Teyou described his motives for writing his book, saying, "We are entitled to rise against the injustice that is crippling our country. We cannot let evil go unquestioned... This book is the expression of my dissatisfaction with what is going on in Cameroon, especially the macabre system that gives Chantal Biya the leeway to treat people around her with extreme cruelty."

On 2 May 2011, Teyou was freed when the London chapter of International PEN agreed to pay his fine from its emergency fund in order that he might immediately seek medical treatment for his worsening condition. He then received treatment. The chair of African literature at the University of Bayreuth also offered to pay the expenses for La Belle de la république bananière to be reprinted in Germany.

== Arson in Besançon ==
On June 26, 2015 parts of the Hôtel de Ville (city hall) of Besançon were destroyed by a fire caused by two Molotov cocktails. Arrested and suspected of this arson was Bertrand Zepherin Teyou, who lived in France as a refugee since May 2013. He wanted to start his own publishing house, but could not do so because of lack of funds. He then asked for assistance of an association which helps people to start their own business, but felt that the support he had obtained was not satisfactory. Some weeks before the arson, Teyou had made two sit-ins at the City Hall, forcing police to intervene to dislodge him. During his second sit-in, had threatened the staff of the municipality by saying he would "all burn down", if his demands were not met. Teyou was found guilty and subsequently sentenced to five years in prison.
