= Pomo language =

Pomo may refer to:

- One of the Pomo languages of California
- A dialect of the Pol language of Cameroon
