= Kwakum language =

Bantu language of Cameroon

Kwakum
- Native to: Cameroon
- Native speakers: 10,000 (2002)
- Language family: Niger–Congo?: Atlantic–Congo; Benue–Congo; Bantoid; Bantu (Zone A); Makaa–Njem + Kako (A.80–90); Kaka; Kwakum

Language codes
- ISO 639-3: kwu
- Glottolog: kwak1266
- Guthrie code: A.91

Kwakum (ISO [kwu]) is classified as belonging to the Bantu subgroup A90 (Kaka) of the Zone “A” Bantu languages, and specifically labelled A91 by Guthrie. According to one of the newest updates to the Bantu classification system, other languages belonging to this subgroup are: Pol (A92a), Pɔmɔ (A92b), Kweso (A92C) and Kakɔ (A93). The Kwakum people refer to themselves (and their language) as either Kwakum or Bakoum (sometimes spelled Bakum). However, they say that the "Bakoum" pronunciation only began after the arrival of Europeans in Cameroon, though it is frequently used today. Kwakum is mainly spoken in the East region of Cameroon, southwest of the city Bertoua.

== Dialects ==
Kwakum is listed by Simons & Fennig as having three dialects: Til, Beten (or Mbeten, or Petem), and Baki (or Mbaki). According to David Hare, there are two main districts in which Kwakum is spoken: Dimako and Doumé. The Dimako district has 8 villages centered around the town of Dimako. The Doumé district has 8 villages centered around the town of Doumé. The lexical similarity between the Kwakum spoken in these two districts is 92.3%. Among these villages are the two villages of Baktala and Longtimbi. The people who live in these villages consider themselves to be Kwakum, but also call themselves Til. There is a lexical similarity of 91.4% between the Kwakum spoken in the Dimako district and the language spoken in the Til villages.

There are four villages of people who consider themselves to be Mbeten (and not Kwakum). The lexical similarity between the Kwakum of the Dimako district and the Mbeten villages is 81.3%. The Mbaki live far from the Kwakum and the lexical similarity is only 47.7%. It is thus unlikely that Mbaki should be considered a dialect of Kwakum.

=== ALCAM (2012) ===
According to ALCAM (2012), the Kwakum inhabit 8 villages in Dimako commune (Haut-Nyong department) and its chief town, plus 3 villages in Doumé commune south of Doumé city (Haut-Nyong department, Eastern Region). They number about 10,000.

The Betán (or Til), who occupy three villages in the commune of Dimako (Longtimbi, Kpaktala, and Siafum) came from the north, from the village of Mbeten where Betán is still spoken - in the vicinity of Pol, north of Bertoua (Pol canton, commune of Bélabo and Diang, department of Lom-et-Djerem, Eastern Region).

Finally, the Baki, further north, occupy the three villages of Mbaki 1, Mbaki 2 and Mbambo.

== Tone ==
Kwakum is a tonal language, and has been analyzed by Stacey Hare as having three tones.

== Current Literature ==
The first analysis of Kwakum was completed in 2005 by François Belliard. Though this work focused on the music of the Kwakum, there is a brief description of the phonology and grammar. This dissertation was simplified into the form of a book entitled Parlons Kwakum (Let's Speak Kwakum) and published in 2007. Both works by Belliard are only available in French.

David Hare completed an MA thesis entitled Tense in Kwakum Narrative Discourse in June 2018. Stacey Hare wrote her MA thesis on Tone in Kwakum (A91) with an application to orthography. Elisabeth Njantcho Kouagang wrote a doctoral dissertation entitled A grammar of Kwakum in 2018 as well. These three works are only available in English. All data used for David Hare's thesis can be found on his blog.
