= Abisola =

Given name

Abísólá
- Gender: Born into wealth
- Language: Yoruba

Origin
- Origin: Nigerian
- Region of origin: South West Nigeria

Pronunciation of Abisola

Abisola is a feminine given name of Yoruba origin which translates as Born into wealth.

== Notable people with the name ==
- Little Simz (Simbiatu Abisola Abiola Ajikawo; born 1994), British rapper
- Abisola Esther Biya (born 1992), Nigerian author
- Alon Abisola Arisicate Ajoke Olajuwon (born 1988), Nigerian–American basketball player and coach
- Abisola Omolade, Nigerian art director

== Fictional characters ==
- Abishola Bolatito Doyinsola Oluwatoyin Wheeler, one of the titular characters in the American television sitcom Bob Hearts Abishola

== See also ==
- Bisola
