= Government of Cameroon =

The Republic of Cameroon is a decentralized unitary state.

== State power ==
In the Republic of Cameroon, the President of the Republic and the Parliament exercise 'State power' as per Article 4 of the constitution of Cameroon.

== Executive power ==
Executive power is vested in the President and the Government.

=== The president ===
A presidential election determines the President of the Republic. The presidential elections take place every seven years and the vote is made through direct, equal and secret suffrage. The President is elected by a majority of the vote cast for a term of seven years in office renewable only one time. (Constitution of Cameroon: Article 6) The president of the Republic defines the policy of the nation, appoint the government officials and other senior administrative officials and define their function with respect to the policy he defines; the President of the Republic put an end to these appointment.

=== The government ===
It is the duty of the Government to implement the policy of the nation. (Constitution of Cameroon: Article 11) The Prime Minister and the Council of Ministers lead the government. The Prime Minister is appointed by the President of the republic and the Council of Minister is made of ministers also appointed by the President of the republic on the proposal of the Prime Minister. The powers of the President of the Republic might be delegate by this one to the Prime Minister, any one of the Ministers or senior administrative officials of the State, Minister within their respective agendas.(Constitution of Cameroon: Article 10)

Pursuant to Article 14 of the 1996 Constitution (Law No. 96-06 of 18 January 1996), Legislative power rests with the Parliament which consists of The National Assembly (lower house) and The Senate (upper house). The Parliament has legislative power in matters relating to (a) The fundamental rights, guarantees and obligations of the citizen; (b) The status of persons and property ownership system; (c) The political, administrative and judicial organization; (d) The following financial and patrimonial matters; (e) Programming the objectives of economic and social action; and (f) The system of education in the country – Article 26. However, pursuant to Article 28 of the 1996 Constitution, Parliament may empower the President of the Republic to legislate by way of ordinance for a limited period and for given purposes. Such ordinances shall be tabled before the bureau of the National Assembly and the Senate for purposes of ratification within the time-limit laid down by enabling law.

== Public administration ==
The numerous administrations existing in Cameroon can be seen as the government in charge of the policy of the nation within the framework of their respective duties.

- Ministry of Social Affairs: Following decree n°75/467 of June 28, 1975, the Social Affairs Department is established as a Ministry in its own rights. The Ministry of Social Affairs is organised by Decree n°75/723 of November 1975. Madam Delphine TSANGA, economist, is at the Head of this ministerial department, there are central and external services. There were two Departments: Private Assistance Department and Social Development Department. External services were Provincial Services of Social Affairs, Divisional Sectors of Social Affairs, and Social Posts. Decree n°77/495 of December 7, 1977 fixes of functioning conditions and creation of Private Social Structures (OSP). Decree n°78/056 of February 23, 1978, creates the National Rehabilitation Centre for Persons with Disabilities initiated by the Canadian Cardinal Paul Emile LEGER. Decree n°80/199 of June 9, 1980 creates the National School of Social Workers (ENAAS) of Yaounde. A small innovation intervenes in 1981, with Decree n°81/295 of July 23, creating within the Ministry of Social Affairs, a Women Empowerment and Social Defence Service.
- Ministry of Agriculture and Rural Development
- The Superior State Audit: ministry under the Presidency of the Republic
- Minister-Delegate at the Presidency in charge of Relations with the Assemblies
- Ministry of Commerce 4.7. Ministry of Communication
- Ministry of Culture
- Ministry of Defense
- Ministry under the Presidency of the Republic
- Ministry of Urban development and Housing
- Ministry of Economy and Finance
- Ministry of Finance (Cameroon)
- Ministry of Basic Education
- Ministry of Livestock Fisheries and Animal Industries
- Ministry of Employment & Vocational Training
- Ministry of Energy & Water Resources
- Ministry Of Secondary Education
- Ministry of Secondary and Superior Education
- Ministry of Environment & Nature Protection in Cameroon
- Ministry of the Public Service and Administrative Reforms
- Ministry of Forestry & Wildlife
- Ministry of Industry, Mines & Technological Development
- Ministry of planning, Programming and Regional Development
- Ministry of Small & Medium Size Enterprises, Social Economy & Handicraft
- Ministry of Posts & Telecommunications
- Ministry of Women Empowerment and the Family
- Ministry of Scientific Research & Innovation
- Minister of External Relations
- Ministry of Public Health
- Ministry of Sports and Physical Education
- Ministry of Tourism
- Ministry of Transport (Robert Nkili; 2011-2015)
- Ministry of Labor & Social Security(Robert Nkili; 2002-2011)
- Ministry of Public Works
- Ministry of Justice
- Ministry of Territorial Administration and Decentralization: Preparation, implementation and assessment of Government policy on territorial administration, decentralization and civil protection is within the framework of the duties assigned to the MINATD. It is the duty of the MINATD to organize the territorial administrative units, chiefdoms and external services, to organize national and local elections and referendums in accordance with constitutional laws. By assuring the preparation and implementation of the laws and regulations and the maintenance of public order, the MINATD acts as a guarantor public liberties- associations and political organizations; religious organizations; non-profit movements, organizations and associations. Performing as a guarantor of the state powers, the MINATD oversees the activities of regional and local authorities. The MINATD is also in charge of preventing and managing the risks related to natural disasters.

== Regional government ==
Originality, the Republic of Cameroon was divided into provinces. The appellation "regions" came with the Amendment of the Constitution of 1996. The regions are the primary subdivisions in Cameroon. The ten regions of Cameroon are: Adamawa, Centre, East, Far North, Northwest, West, South, Southwest, Littoral and North.

Considering the fact that the Law No. 96-06 of 18 January 1996 did not yet came into force, a region is under the authority of a Governor appointed by Presidential Decree meaning that the governor represents the authority of the President of the Republic and implicitly upholds the authority of the State in the province/region where he is appointed. Each Ministers assigns to each region a competent provincial delegate in charge of implementing the policy of the state in his province within the framework of the responsibility assigned to their respective Ministerial department. For example, the Minister of Public Health appoints to each province a Delegate in charge of Public Health to coordinate the duty assigned to the Ministry of Public Health at the regional level. It is the same for all the Ministerial departments. With the collaboration of provincial delegates, the governor covers the general administration and co-ordination of the work of the civil service in the province, with the exception of those aspects that fall within the remit of the Minister for justice. And we also have to notice that all local government officials are employees of the central government's Ministry of Territorial Administration, from which local governments also get most of their budgets.

The regions are subdivided into departments.

== Department administration ==
There are 58 departments in Cameroon. As in the French model, the capital of a department is called a prefecture (préfecture). A department is under the authority of a prefect (préfet) appointed by Presidential decree, meaning that the prefect upholds both the authority of the State and implicitly the authority of the region at the local level. Each Ministerial department appoints to each department a departmental delegate in charge of preparing and implementing the policy of the state in his department within the framework of their respective agenda. For example, the Minister of Secondary Education appoints to each department a delegate in charge of secondary education to coordinate the duty assigned to the Ministry of Secondary Education at the local level.

== District administration ==
Departments are subdivided in arrondissements, which are further subdivided in districts. As is the case for French administrative division, the capital of an arrondissement is a sub prefecture (French: sous-préfecture). An arrondissement is under the authority of a sub-prefect (sous-préfet), who upholds the authority of the state in the arrondissement.
