= Bangou, Cameroon =

Bangou
- Village
- Location of Bangou in Cameroon
- Coordinates: 5°12′N 10°23′E
- Country: Cameroon
- Province: West Province

Government
  - Mayor: Mboutchouang Rosette

Population
  - Total: 12,000
- Time zone: UTC+1 (WAT)
  - Summer (DST): UTC+1 (not observed)

Bangou is a village of the Bamileke people in the West Province of Cameroon with a population of around 12,000. However, most people that consider themselves "from Bangou" do not reside in Bangou, but in Yaoundé, Douala, Nkongsamba or other cities in Cameroon and the world.

In fact there are Bangou associations in France, United Kingdom, Belgium and the United States as well as possibly other countries. There are also NGOs formed exclusively for the development of Bangou such as Association Solidarité France Bangou (ASFB) and American Association for the Development of Bangou (AADB).

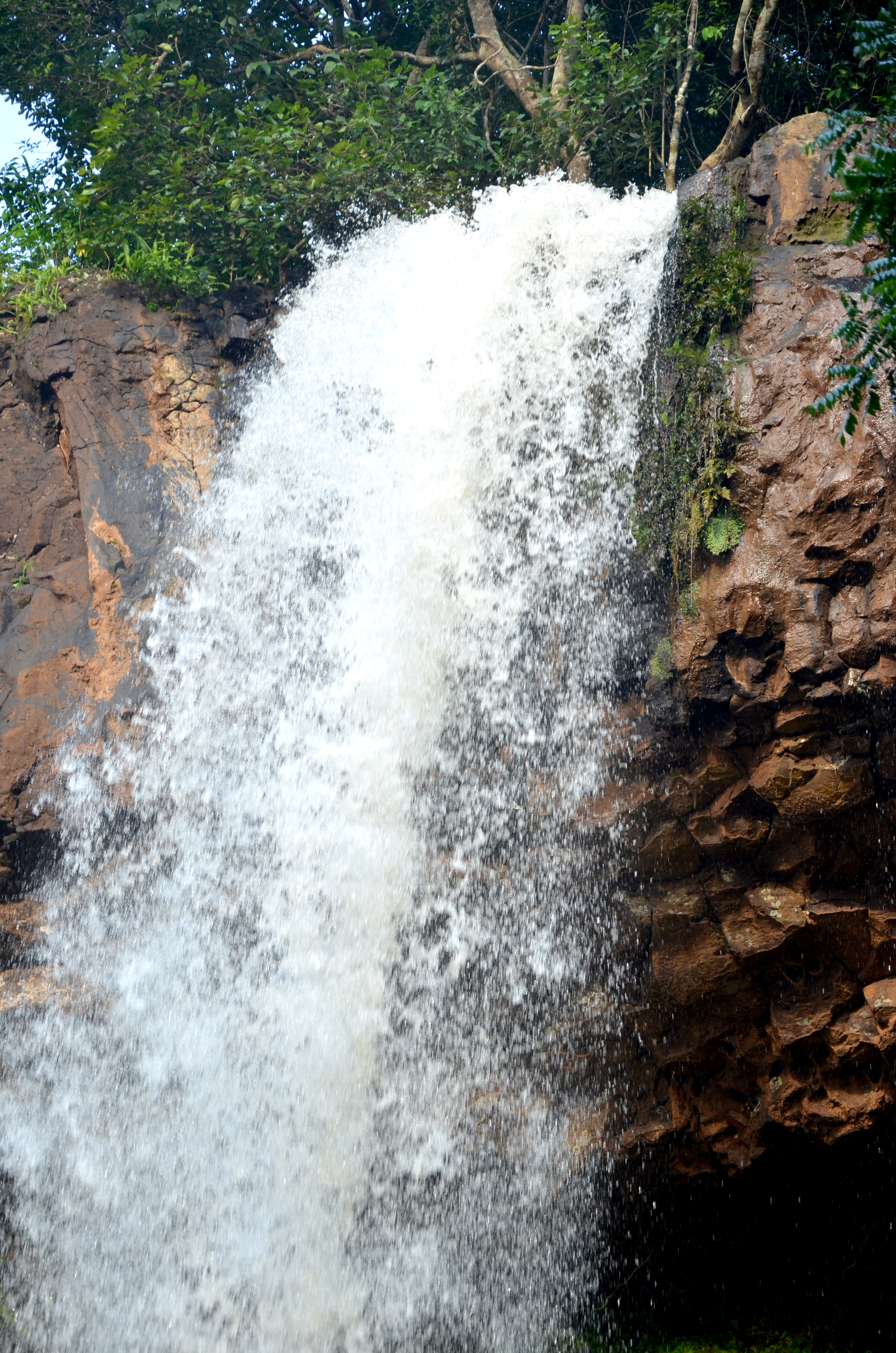
Chute Bangoua5

Baloungou is a district of Bangou with a population of about 3,500.

The current mayor of Bangou is Mboutchouang Rosette, the mother of Chantal Biya, President Paul Biya's wife.

The traditional Chief is Tayo II Marcel. While the Chief does not have legal or political authority, his role as a traditional leader helps to settle disputes among groups of people and families in lieu of the legal court systems.

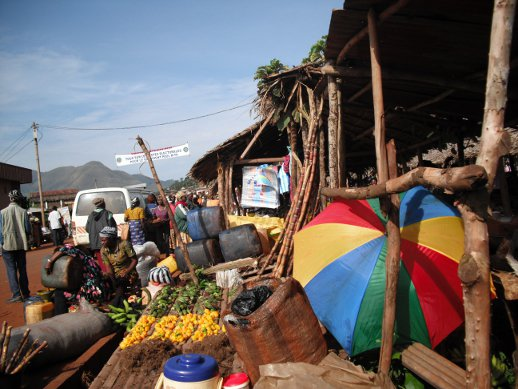
Market day on the carrefour (highway) of Bangou

Like many other villages in the West region, agriculture is the predominant economic subsistence in Bangou. The main staple crops that are cultivated are corn, potatoes, yams, bananas, plantains, and beans. Sources of meat are beef, goat, pigs, fish and "bush meat" that people hunt from the forests.

In addition to the numerous primary schools, there is a hospital in Bangou, a small bank that deals in micro-credit and a hotel (Hotel de la Paix).

== See also ==
- Communes of Cameroon

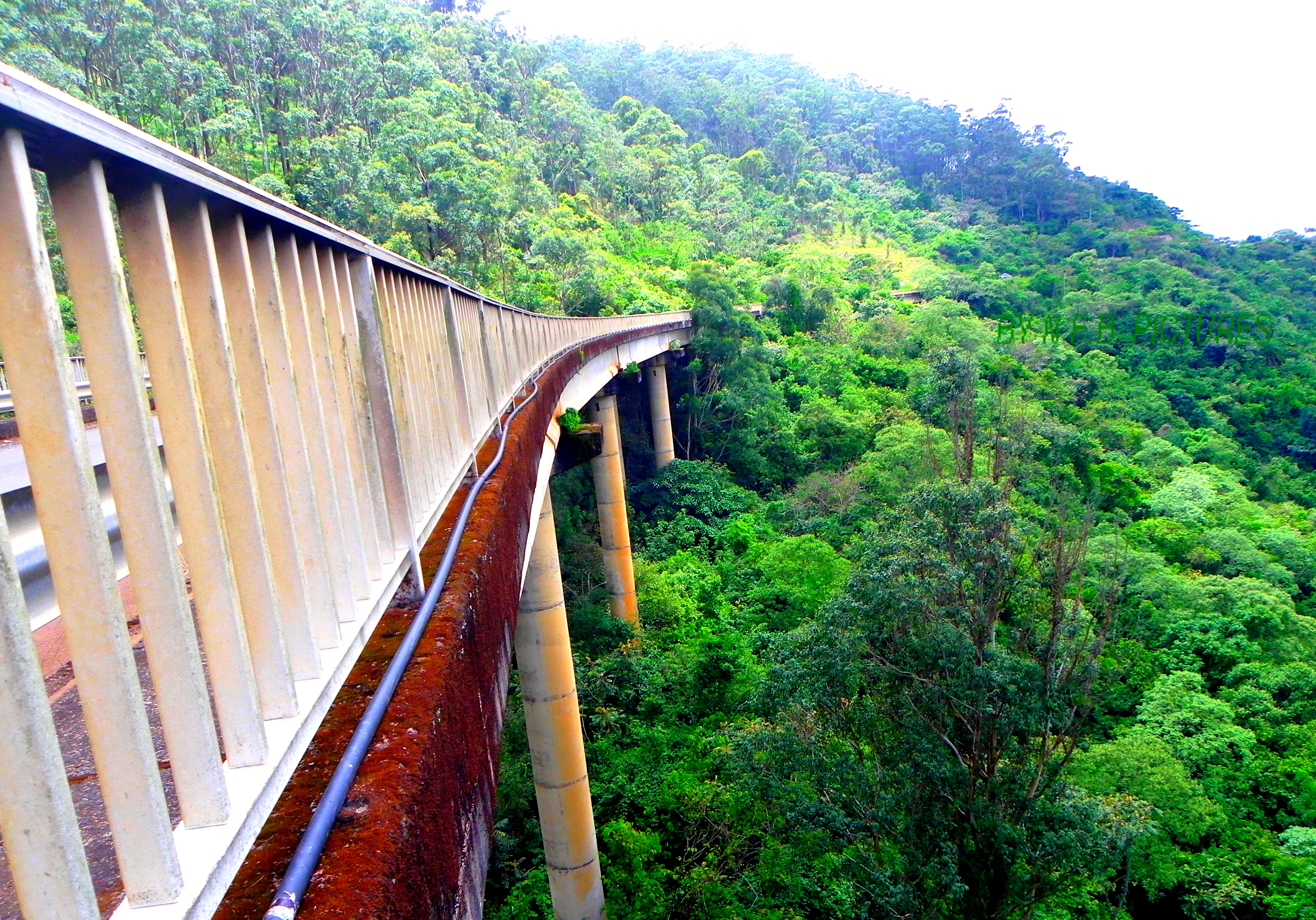
VIADUC de BANGOU-BANA au Cameroun

== Gallery ==
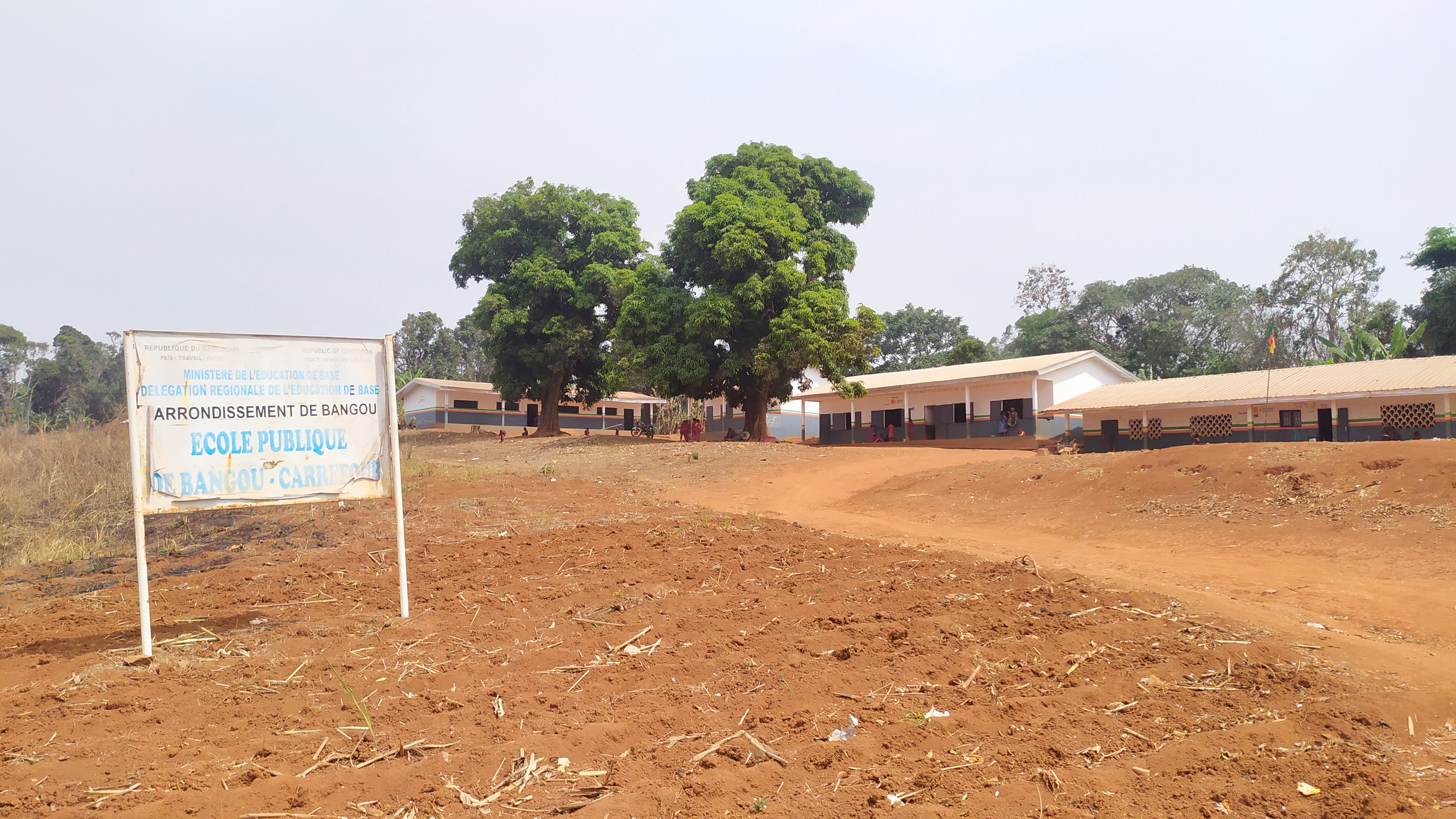
Government primary school Bangou

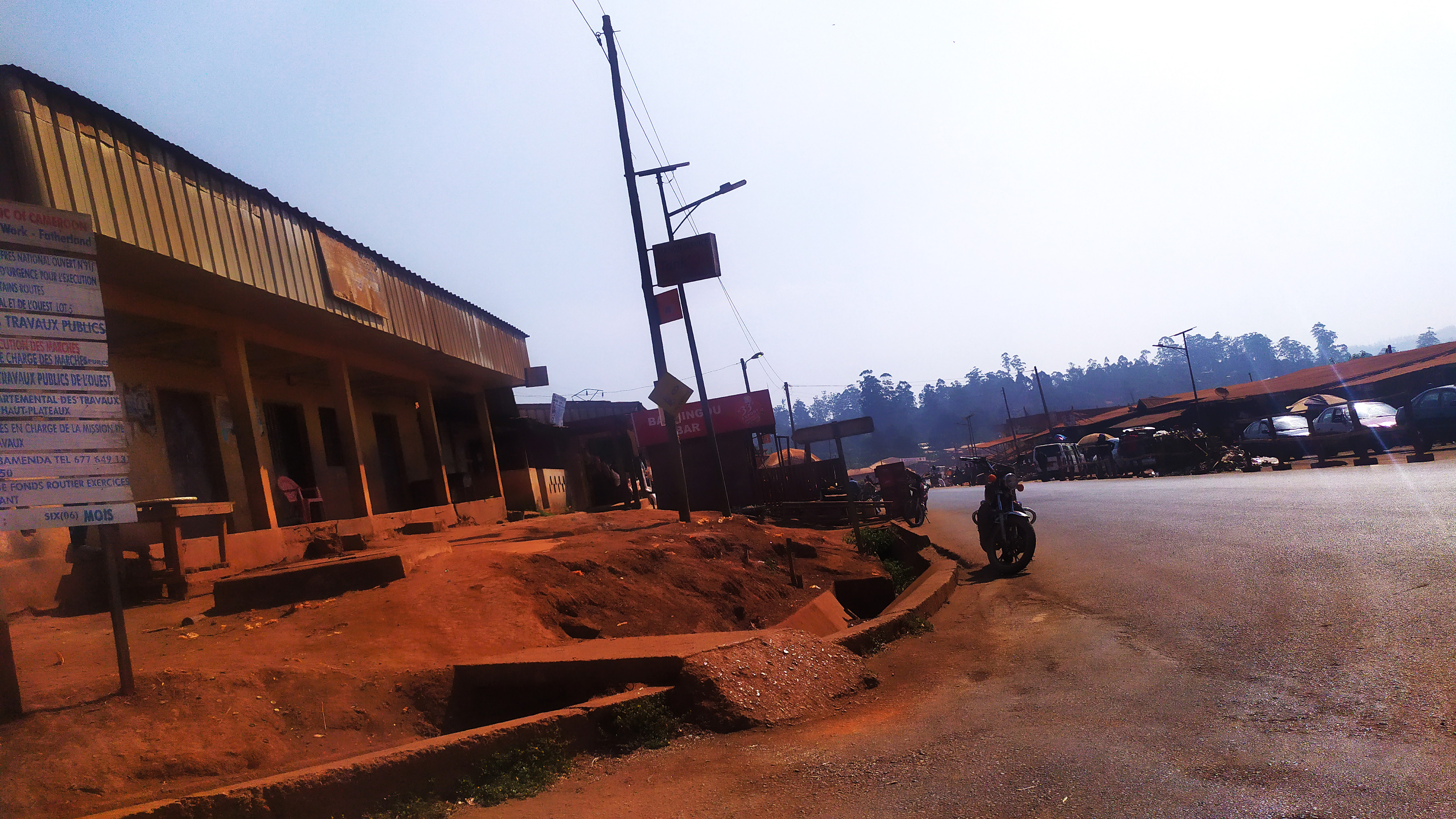
Main road at Bangou Junction
