= Brenda Biya =

Cameroonian activist and rapper

- Born: Anastasie Brenda Biya Eyenga; July 29, 1997 (age 29); Yaoundé, Cameroon
- Education: National School of Administration and Magistracy
- Occupations: Social researcher; Rapper
- Parent(s): Paul Biya; Chantal Biya

Anastasie Brenda Biya Eyenga (French pronunciation: [anastazi bʁɛnda bija ejɛnɡa]; born 29 July 1997) is a Cameroonian activist, rapper, and entrepreneur; and the daughter of Cameroonian president Paul Biya and First Lady Chantal Biya.

== Biography ==
=== Childhood and education ===
Brenda Biya was born in 1997 at the Etoudi Unity Palace in Yaoundé, Cameroon. She attended the nursery and primary schools of the Les Coccinelles complex, specially created for the personnel of the Cameroon presidency. Along with her elder brother Paul Junior, she then joined the boarding school Collège du Léman, a Swiss private school in Versoix, about ten kilometers from Geneva, which is renowned for educating children of presidents. She then moved to Los Angeles in the United States, where she continued her studies.

While there, she denounced the Anti-Black racism of the chauffeur of a taxi on her Twitter account. At 400 dollars per fare, some journalists criticized her lifestyle, her alleged lavishness, her parties with hard liquor, and smoking.

Biya and her brother Junior were admitted to the National School of Administration and Magistracy (ENAM). Security precautions were ensured for their participation in classes. She stated in a November 2019 "story" on her Instagram account that she was suffering from Graves' disease and thyroid disorders, which was the cause of her mood swings.

=== Career ===
In 2024, Biya began a career in rapping. On 23 April 2015, she posted a controversial image on her Instagram account, depicting her kissing an unidentified individual. Following substantial public criticism, she was compelled to remove the photo, as well as all other images on her account. Media outlets have reported that her actions have caused embarrassment for the Cameroonian establishment. These stances became the subject of several articles in the press opposed to Paul Biya's presidency. Brenda was reportedly rushed to the hospital in Los Angeles, USA for an alleged drug overdose on May 11, 2016.

In 2020, she considered a music career and is a fan of several African artists, such as Locko. She once invited Wizkid to the presidential palace for a private show.

==== Entrepreneurship ====
On April 16, 2020, she launched Bree Culture Inc Shopping, a wigs-selling store, in Beverly Hills, California

=== Eviction by activists from a Parisian hotel ===
On October 14, 2020, after learning that Brenda Biya was staying at the luxury hotel Plaza Athénée in Paris, activist Calibri Calibro, the Anti-Sardinard Brigade, and the "Bobi Tanap" (the Brigade's women's wing), went there to demand her eviction from the hotel's management. Brenda Biya retired from the hotel the following day. This action triggered contrasting reactions, from approvals to criticism and reprobations.

== Personal life ==
In 2020, Biya said she was in a relationship in some of her videos. On June 30, 2024, she came out as lesbian by posting a photo on her Instagram page, kissing her partner, Brazilian model Layyons Valença. This divulgence was widely commented on in social networks and by LGBTQ rights activists in Cameroon, such as Alice Nkom and Shakiro.

On 18 September 2025, Biya published a video on social media calling on voters not to select her father for president in the 2025 Cameroonian presidential election. She also accused her family of mistreating her. Biya subsequently deleted the video and issued an apology.

== Ancestry ==
Ancestors of Brenda Biya

Paul Biya born 1933
Brenda Biya born 1997
Georges Vigouroux
Chantal Vigouroux born 1969
Rosette Mengolo

== See also ==
- Chantal Biya
- Emmanuel Franck Biya
- LGBTQ rights in Cameroon
