= Germaine Ahidjo =

Cameroonian politician (1932–2021)

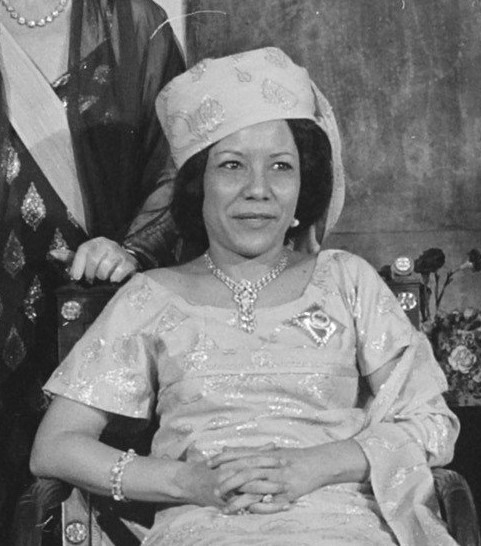
- Germaine Ahidjo in July 1979

First Lady of Cameroon
- In office 5 May 1960 – 6 November 1982
- President: Ahmadou Ahidjo
- Preceded by: Position created
- Succeeded by: Jeanne-Irène Biya

Personal details
- Born: 11 February 1932; Mokolo, French Cameroon
- Died: 20 April 2021 (aged 89); Dakar, Senegal
- Political party: Cameroonian National Union
- Spouse(s): Touffic Boubakari (divorced); Ahmadou Ahidjo (1956–1989; his death)
- Children: 4

Germaine Habiba Ahidjo (11 February 1932 – 20 April 2021) was a Cameroonian politician and nurse. She was the wife of the first president of Cameroon, Ahmadou Ahidjo. She was thus the First Lady of Cameroon from 1960 until 1982.

== Biography ==
Germaine Ahidjo was born in 1932 in Mokolo in the present-day Far North Region of Cameroon. Her mother was Fulani and her father was Corsican.

In 1942, she obtained her certificate of studies in Yaoundé. She later joined the Girls College of Douala, today New-Bell High School.

In 1947, she was awarded a scholarship to France, where she graduated as a state nurse in 1952 and specialized in tropical diseases.

She became friends with Ahmadou Ahidjo in 1955 and they were married on 17 August 1956. They had three daughters: Babette, Aissatou and Aminatou. She also had a son, Daniel Toufick, born before her marriage with Ahidjo. Mohamadou Badjika Ahidjo, now a deputy and a visiting ambassador, is the son of Ahidjo with his first wife, Ada Garoua. After the resignation of her husband in 1982 and her death sentence in absentia as a result of her supposed involvement in the failed coup of 1984, they settled in Dakar, Senegal, where she still lived. Her husband died on 30 November 1989. She campaigned for his official rehabilitation, including the repatriation of his ashes to Cameroon.

She died on 19 April 2021, at age 89 in Dakar, Senegal, where she had been suffering from protracted illness.

== Honours ==
=== Foreign honours ===
- Spain: Dame Grand Cross of the Order of Isabella the Catholic (20 September 1982).
