= Hôtel de Ville, Besançon =

Town hall in Besançon, France

Hôtel de Ville
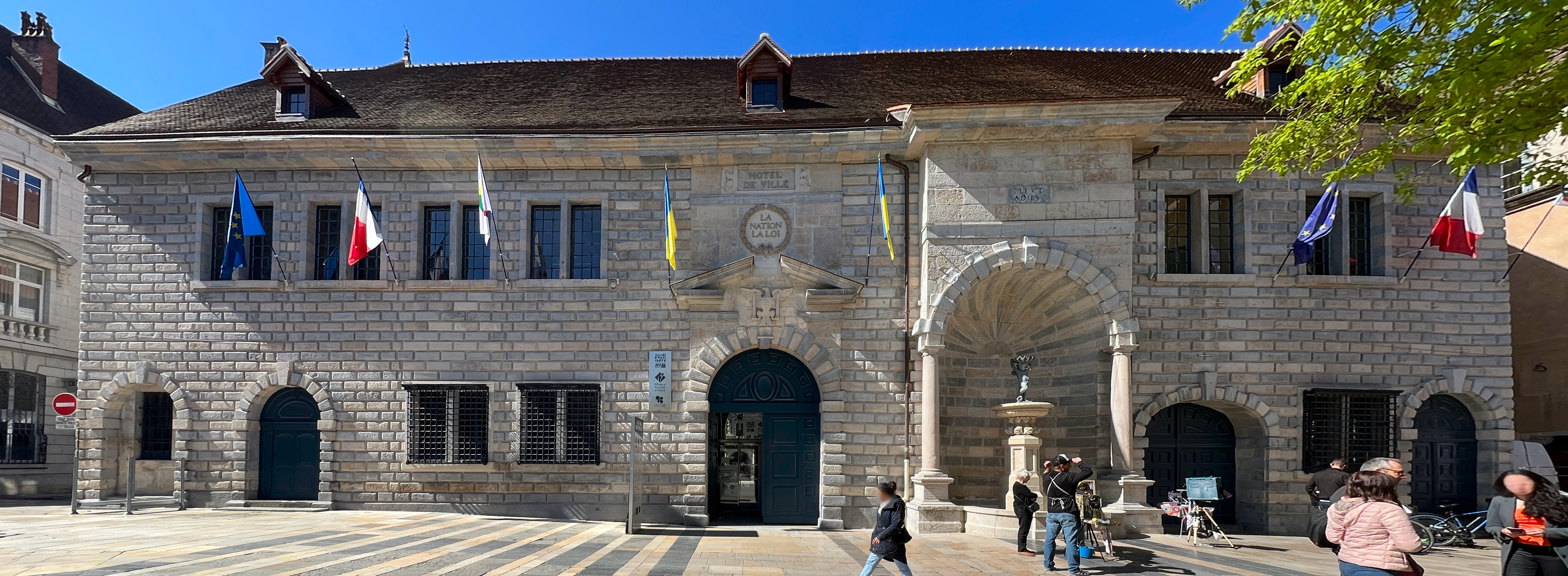
- The main frontage of the Hôtel de Ville in April 2022

General information
- Type: City hall
- Architectural style: Renaissance style
- Location: Besançon, France
- Coordinates: 47.2378°N 6.0239°E
- Completed: 1573

Design and construction
- Architect: Richard Maire

Monument historique
- Official name: Hôtel de ville
- Type: Inscrit
- Designated: 1912
- Reference no.: PA00101510

The Hôtel de Ville (French pronunciation: [otɛl də vil], City Hall) is a municipal building in Besançon, Doubs, eastern France, standing on Place du 8-Septembre. It was designated a monument historique by the French government in 1912.

== History ==
An early town hall was established on Place Saint-Pierre (now Place du 8-Septembre) between 1393 and 1397. In 1569, local officials decided to reconstruct the building on the same site. The new building was designed by Richard Maire in the Renaissance style, using multi-coloured stones from the Forest of Chailluz, and was completed in 1573.

The design involved an asymmetrical main frontage with nine ground floor bays facing onto the Place Saint-Pierre. The central bay featured a round headed opening with voussoirs and a keystone surmounted by a carving of an eagle rising into a broken pediment. The bay to the right of the centre bay was slightly projected forward and featured a tall niche, which originally contained a statue of Charles V riding a double-headed eagle. The first, second, seventh and ninth bays also contained round headed openings, while the other bays on the ground floor and all the bays on the first floor were fenestrated by bi-partite square headed windows. At roof level there was a prominent cornice and three dormer windows. The statue of Charles V was torn down during the French Revolution and subsequently replaced by a fountain.

Internally, the principal rooms were the Salle des Pas Perdus (room of lost steps) and the Salle des Mariages (wedding room). Over subsequent centuries, the birth and death certificates of notable residents, including the writer, Victor Hugo, the philosopher, Pierre-Joseph Proudhon, and the socialist writer, Charles Fourier, were installed in the Salle des Pas Perdus, while portraits of the 29 mayors elected since the French Revolution were installed in the Salle des Mariages.

Following the liberation of the town on 7 September 1944, during the Second World War, the chairman of the Provisional Government of the French Republic, General Charles de Gaulle, visited the town and gave a speech in front of the town hall on 23 September 1944.

On 25 June 2015, the interior of the building was badly damaged by a fire after two Molotov cocktails were thrown at the building. The fire caused extensive damage to the reception area and visitor centre on the ground floor, as well as the reception rooms on the first floor. The Cameroonian author, Bertrand Teyou, who had lived in France as a refugee since May 2013, was arrested for the crime. Teyou claimed that the council had failed to give adequate financial support to his business. He was found guilty and subsequently sentenced to five years in prison. After an extensive programme of repair works had been carried out at a cost of €2.8 million, the building re-opened on 4 May 2019.
