= Jeanne-Irène Biya =

First Lady of Cameroon from 1982 to 1992

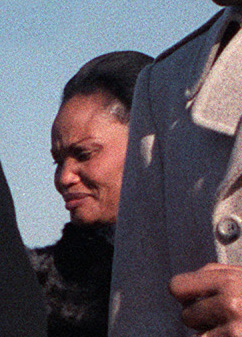
- Biya in 1986

First Lady of Cameroon
- In role 6 November 1982 – 29 July 1992
- President: Paul Biya
- Preceded by: Germaine Ahidjo
- Succeeded by: Chantal Biya (1994)

Personal details
- Born: Jeanne-Irène Atyam Ndoumin; 12 October 1935 Monengombo, Endom commune, Nyong-et-Mfoumou, French Cameroon
- Died: 29 July 1992 (aged 56) Yaoundé, Cameroon
- Spouse: Paul Biya (m. 1961)
- Children: Franck Biya

Jeanne-Irène Biya (12 October 1935 – 29 July 1992) was the First Lady of Cameroon from 1982 until her death in 1992, as the first wife of President Paul Biya.

== Biography ==
Biya was born Jeanne-Irène Atyam Ndoumin on 12 October 1935 in Endom in the Ava-Ava family. She was educated by her uncle Thomas Ndoumin, who was a cocoa farmer and exporter and the younger brother of Jean-Louis Ava-Ava who served as a deputy for decades. She had a younger brother, Robert Nkili, who served as Minister of Labour and Social Security alongside Minister of Transport after gaining influence with Biya due to Jeanne's marriage.

She married Paul Biya on 2 September 1961, in Antony, Paris. She studied at the Nantes School of Midwives in France and, after her return to Cameroon, worked as a qualified midwife in the Pavillon Baudelocque of the Yaoundé Central Hospital. She was socially committed, particularly to children.

Jeanne-Irène Biya died in Yaoundé at the age of 58, when her husband was on a trip in Dakar. Rumors arose in Cameroon that Jeanne-Irène Biya's death had occurred in an unnatural manner, and that he had been out of the country at the time for alibi reasons. It is also speculated that the two nuns of Djoum, who had close relations with Jeanne-Irène Biya, were also assassinated. Paul Biya remarried to Chantal Biya in 1994.

She is buried in Mvomeka'a, the birthplace of her husband.

== Personal life ==
It is speculated that Jeanne-Irène Biya adopted the illegitimate son that Paul Biya had with her sister or niece when he was four years old. He was named Franck Emmanuel Olivier Biya, and is considered to be the successor to his authoritarian father.

Honorary titles
Preceded by Germaine Ahidjo	First Lady of Cameroon; 1982–1992	Succeeded by Chantal Biya
