= Diang, Cameroon =

Coordinates: 4.5833°N 13.3500°E

Diang
- Commune and town
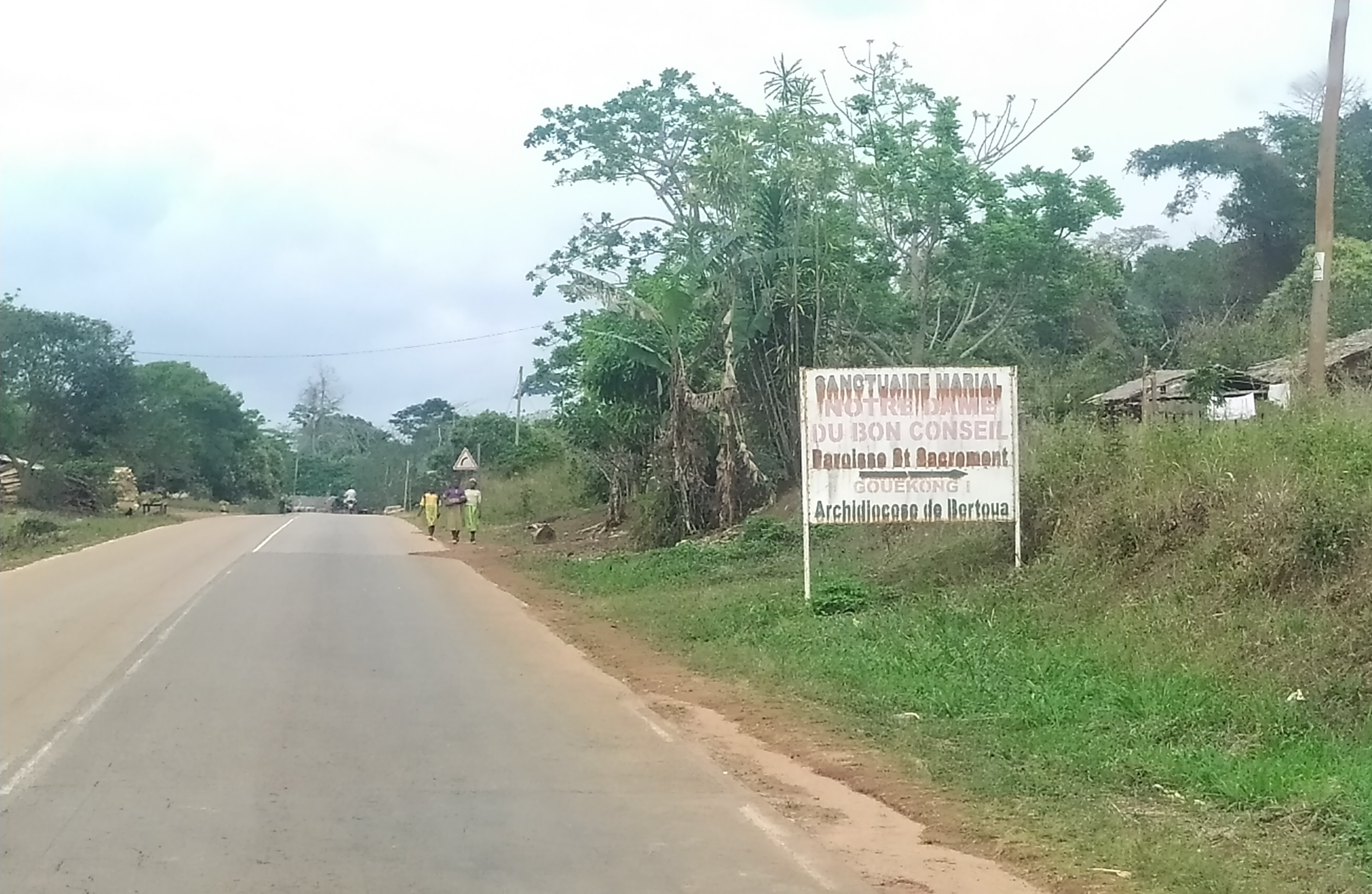
- Gouekong I, a locality in Diang subdivision
- Interactive map of Diang
- Country: Cameroon

Population (2005)
  - Total: 15 795
- Time zone: UTC+1 (WAT)

Diang is a town and commune in Cameroon. It is located in the Departement of Lom-et-Djerem in the East region of Cameroon.

== Population ==
As of 2005, the population of the Diang subdivision was estimated to 15 795 people, with 2 984 people in Dang Locality.

== See also ==
- Communes of Cameroon

== See also ==
- Site de la primature – Élections municipales 2002 (in French)
- Contrôle de gestion et performance des services publics communaux des villes camerounaises- Thèse de Donation Avele, Université Montesquieu Bordeaux IV (in French)
- Charles Nanga, La réforme de l’administration territoriale au Cameroun à la lumière de la loi constitutionnelle n° 96/06 du 18 janvier 1996, Mémoire ENA. (in French)
