= Franck Biya =

Cameroonian businessman (born 1971)

- Born: Emmanuel Franck Olivier Biya; 21 August 1971 (age 55); Yaoundé, Cameroon
- Education: University of Southern California
- Occupation: Businessman
- Children: 4
- Parent(s): Paul Biya (father); Jeanne-Irène Biya (mother)
- Relatives: Chantal Biya (stepmother); Brenda Biya (half-sister)

Emmanuel Franck Olivier Biya (born 21 August 1971), known as Franck Biya, is a Cameroonian businessman. He is the eldest son of Paul Biya, who has been President of Cameroon since 1982, and of his first wife, Jeanne-Irène Biya.

Franck Biya has never stood for election or held public office. He has often been named as a possible successor to his father. The post of vice-president was restored in April 2026, and false reports of his appointment to it have circulated several times. As of November 2026, the post was still vacant.

== Early life and education ==
Franck Biya was born on 21 August 1971 in Yaoundé. He is the eldest son of Paul Biya and his first wife, Jeanne-Irène Atyam, who died in 1992. His father married Chantal Vigouroux in 1994. They had two children, Paul Junior and Brenda.

He went to school in Cameroon and then studied in the United States. In 1994 he graduated from the University of Southern California with a degree in political science and economics.

== Business career ==
After his studies, Franck Biya worked at the Bank of Central African States and then in a forestry company. He was an intern at the bank from 1995 to 1997 and a partner in a forestry group, I.N.G.F., from 1997 to 2004. In 2004 he founded Venture Capital PLC, a company with interests in banking, forestry and energy.

He lived outside Cameroon for many years, first in Los Angeles and then in South Africa and France. He moved back to Cameroon in March 2020.

== Role in the succession debate ==
=== Before 2026 ===
Franck Biya has never stood for election and does not appear in any official organisation chart. He avoids the media and, by 2021, had never given an interview. For a long time he worked only in business. During the 2011 presidential election he appeared regularly beside his father at campaign rallies. In 2013 Jeune Afrique reported that Paul Biya did not rule out appointing him to the new Senate. He was mentioned as a possible candidate in the 2018 presidential election, but did not stand.

Cameroonian newspapers have often presented him as a possible successor to his father. By March 2021 a movement called the "Friends of Franck Biya" had started in Cameroon and spread to the diaspora. Its aim was to support his candidacy in the 2025 presidential election. In April 2021 Voice of America reported that four new groups were calling for him to succeed his father. The most prominent was the Citizens Movement in Support of Franck Biya for Peace and Unity in Cameroon. Franck Biya did not say publicly that he wanted to be president, and people close to him denied that he had political ambitions. Critics suspected Paul Biya of preparing a family dynasty. One opponent of the campaign said that Cameroon was not a monarchy and that, under the constitution, the president of the Senate would take over if Paul Biya died.

Paul Biya stood again in the 2025 presidential election. Franck Biya attended the launch of his father's campaign in October 2025.

=== Vice-presidency reports in 2026 ===
In April 2026 the Parliament of Cameroon amended the constitution to restore the post of vice-president, which had been abolished in 1972. The president appoints and dismisses the vice-president. If the president dies, resigns or is permanently unable to serve, the vice-president completes the term. Critics feared that the change opened the way to a dynastic succession.

Within days, a document presented as a presidential decree dated 4 April 2026 circulated online. It named Franck Biya vice-president, head of the armed forces and minister delegate for defence. Several media outlets in Africa reported the appointment. Officials denied the reports. Africa Check found no authentic decree and noted that the document did not carry the watermark used on official decrees.

In mid-2026 Jeune Afrique and The Africa Report described Franck Biya as a favourite for the vice-presidency. They also reported a conflict over the succession between him and his stepmother, Chantal Biya.

On 30 October 2026 Franck Biya was present when Prince Albert II of Monaco was received by Paul Biya. A Facebook post then claimed that his appointment as vice-president was confirmed. Oswald Baboke, deputy director of the president's civil cabinet, called the claim disinformation. As of November 2026, no vice-president had been appointed and Franck Biya held no constitutional office.

== Personal life ==
Franck Biya is married and has four children.
