= Mandjou =

Coordinates: 4°36′N 13°44′E

- Commune and town
- Interactive map of Mandjou
- Country: Cameroon
- Time zone: UTC+1 (WAT)

Mandjou is a town and commune in Cameroon.

== See also ==
- Communes of Cameroon
