= Lom-et-Djerem =

Department of East Region, Cameroon

- Department
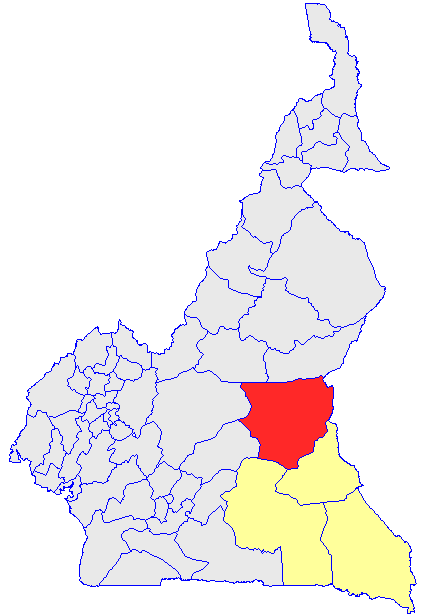
- Department location in Cameroon

- Location within Cameroon Location within Africa
- Country: Cameroon
- Province: East Province
- Capital: Bertoua

Area
  - Total: 26,345 km^{2} (10,172 sq mi)

Population (2001)
  - Total: 228,691
  - Density: 8.6806/km^{2} (22.483/sq mi)
- Time zone: UTC+1 (WAT)

Lom-et-Djerem is a department of East Province in Cameroon. The department covers an area of 26,345 km^{2} and as of 2001 had a total population of 228,691. The capital of the department lies at Bertoua.

== Subdivisions ==
The department is divided administratively into 8 communes and in turn into villages.

=== Communes ===
- Bélabo
- Bertoua
- Bétaré-Oya
- Diang
- Garoua-Boulaï
- Mandjou
- Ngoura
