= Ahmed Fatimah Bisola =

Commissioner for Education and Human Development, Kwara State

Commissioner for Education in Kwara.

Personal details
- Profession: Politician / Teacher

Ahmed Fatimah Bisola was a Commissioner for Education and Human Capital Development, in Kwara State.

== Early life and education ==
Fatimah Ahmed obtained her teaching licence from the Teachers Registration Council of Nigeria as a certified professional teacher. As commissioner for Education in Kwara, she discloses the use of Information and communications technology in Kwara State to transform the education sector. She obtained her teaching licence from the Teacher's Registration Council of Nigeria.

== Career ==
In her career, She set a schedule for writing common entrances for primary students. She discloses that no school should collect school fees for the third term in Kwara State. Also, she warned private secondary schools to take precautions against COVID-19. she warned parents not to let their children in any kind of bad behaviour as students.
