= Chantal Biya =

First Lady of Cameroon since 1994

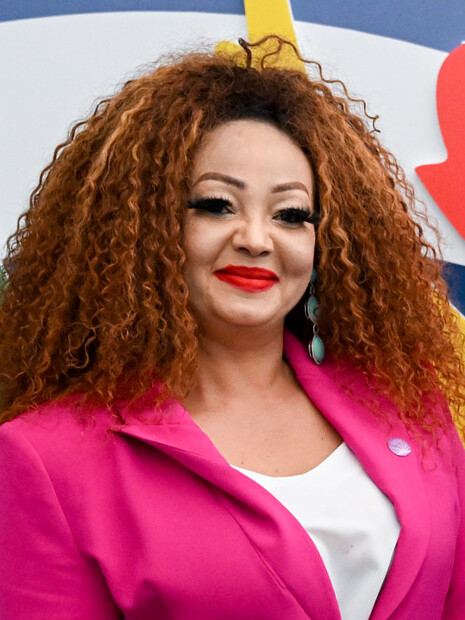
- Biya in 2022

First Lady of Cameroon
- Incumbent
- Assumed role 23 April 1994
- President: Paul Biya
- Preceded by: Jeanne-Irène Biya (1992)

Personal details
- Born: Chantal Pulchérie Vigouroux; 4 December 1970 (age 55) Dimako, East Province, Cameroon
- Spouse: Paul Biya (m. 1994)
- Children: 4, including Brenda
- Parent(s): Georges Vigouroux; Rosette Ndongo Mengolo

Chantal Biya (née Chantal Pulchérie Vigouroux; born 4 December 1970) is a Cameroonian public figure, who is serving as the First Lady of Cameroon since 1994 as the wife of President Paul Biya.

== Early life ==
Chantal Biya was born in Dimako, East Province, Cameroon. Her father was French expatriate Georges Vigouroux. Her mother, Rosette Ndongo Mengolo, was a Miss Doumé pageant winner. Her mother was elected mayor of Bangou following the July 2007 municipal elections. She spent her adolescence in Yaoundé.

== Philanthropy ==
She established the Fondation Chantal Biya in 1994. In 1996, she hosted the inaugural First Ladies Summit in Yaoundé. The Jeunesse active pour Chantal Biya is an organ of her husband's Cameroon People's Democratic Movement.

== Corruption ==
Paul and Chantal Biya's corruption and the theft of national assets of Cameroon has been well-documented. With her son Franck Hertz, she purchased apartments in Paris despite no visible income. U.S. diplomatic cables confirm endemic corruption in Cameroon, which reportedly amounted to more than $650 million between 2017 and 2022.

== Bertrand Teyou ==
In November 2010, Bertrand Teyou published a book, La belle de la république bananière : Chantal Biya, de la rue au palais (English: "The Belle of the Banana Republic: Chantal Biya, from the Streets to the Palace"), tracing Biya's rise from humble origins to become First Lady. He was subsequently given a two-year prison term on charges of "insult to character" and organising an "illegal demonstration" for attempting to hold a public reading.

Amnesty International and PEN International's Writers in Prison Committee both protested his arrest and issued appeals on his behalf. Amnesty International named him a prisoner of conscience. He was freed in April 2011 when a well wisher agreed to pay his fine in order that he might seek treatment for his worsening health.

== Personal life ==
She married Paul Biya, who is 36 years her senior, on 23 April 1994, after his first wife, Jeanne-Irène Biya, died in 1992.

She has twin sons Franck and Patrick Hertz (born 1987) with her first husband. With Paul Biya, she has two children: Paul Jr. and Brenda Biya.

Chantal Biya is known for her elaborate hairstyles. Particularly Mrs. Biya's use of wigs, her signature style is called the banane, and is used for formal occasions. Biya has popularised other styles. Collectively, they are known as the Chantal Biya. She is known for her exotic dresses, including designer dresses, and for her designer purses. Among her favourite designers are high-end European labels such as Chanel, Dior and Louis Vuitton.

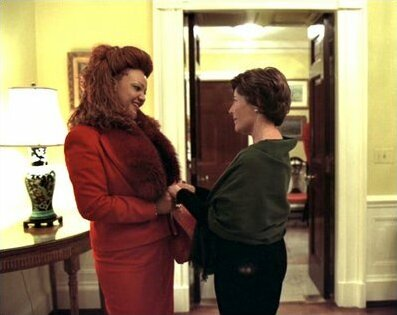
Chantal Biya and Laura Bush after a coffee in the White House's Yellow Oval Room, 2003

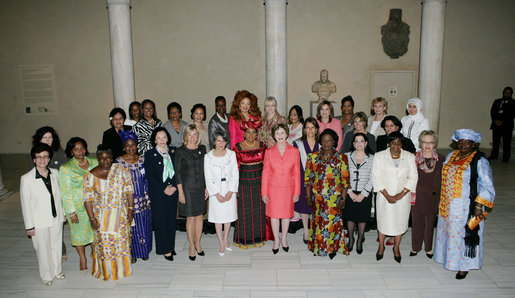
At a global First Ladies meeting in New York, 2008

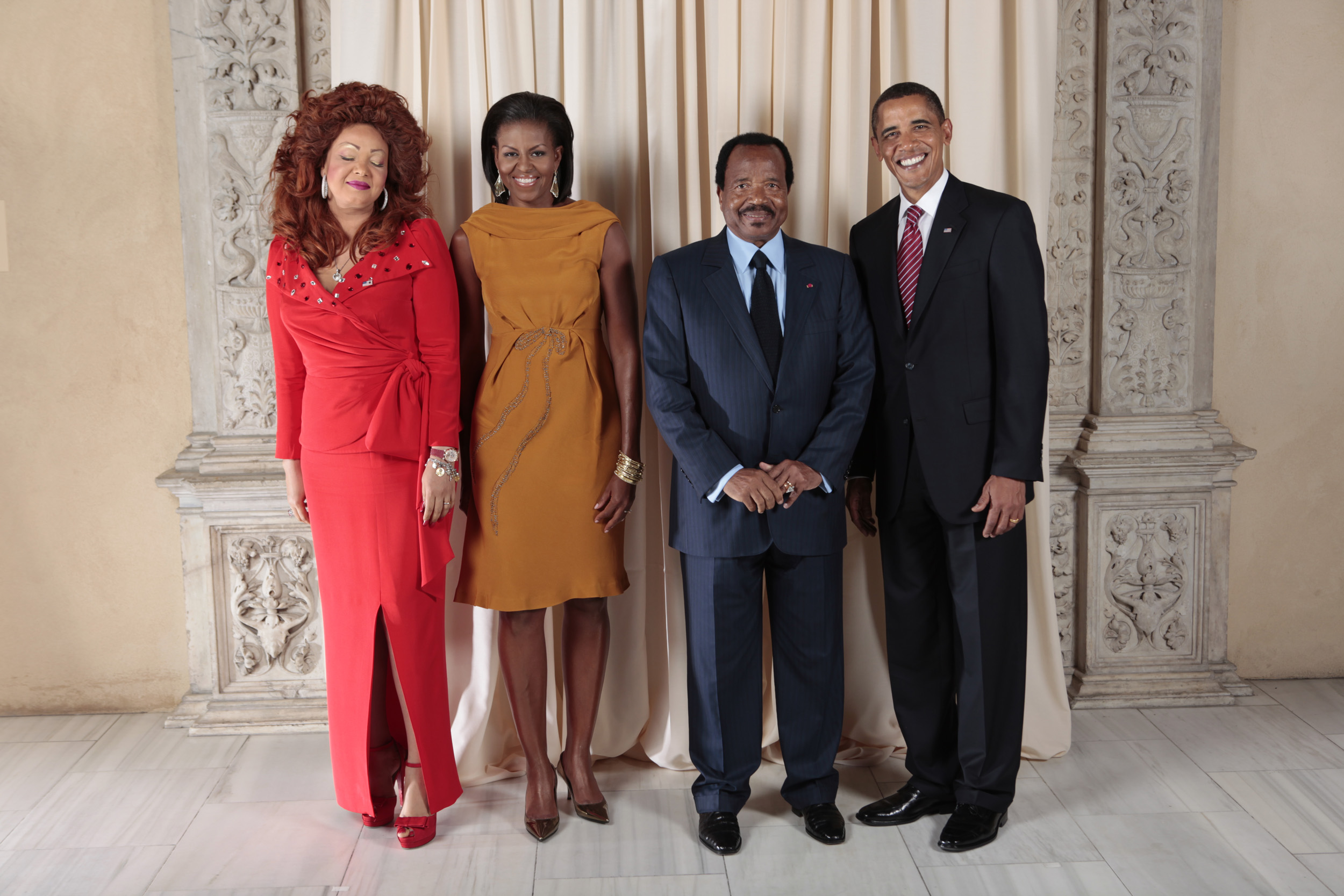
The Obamas with Chantal and Paul Biya, 2009

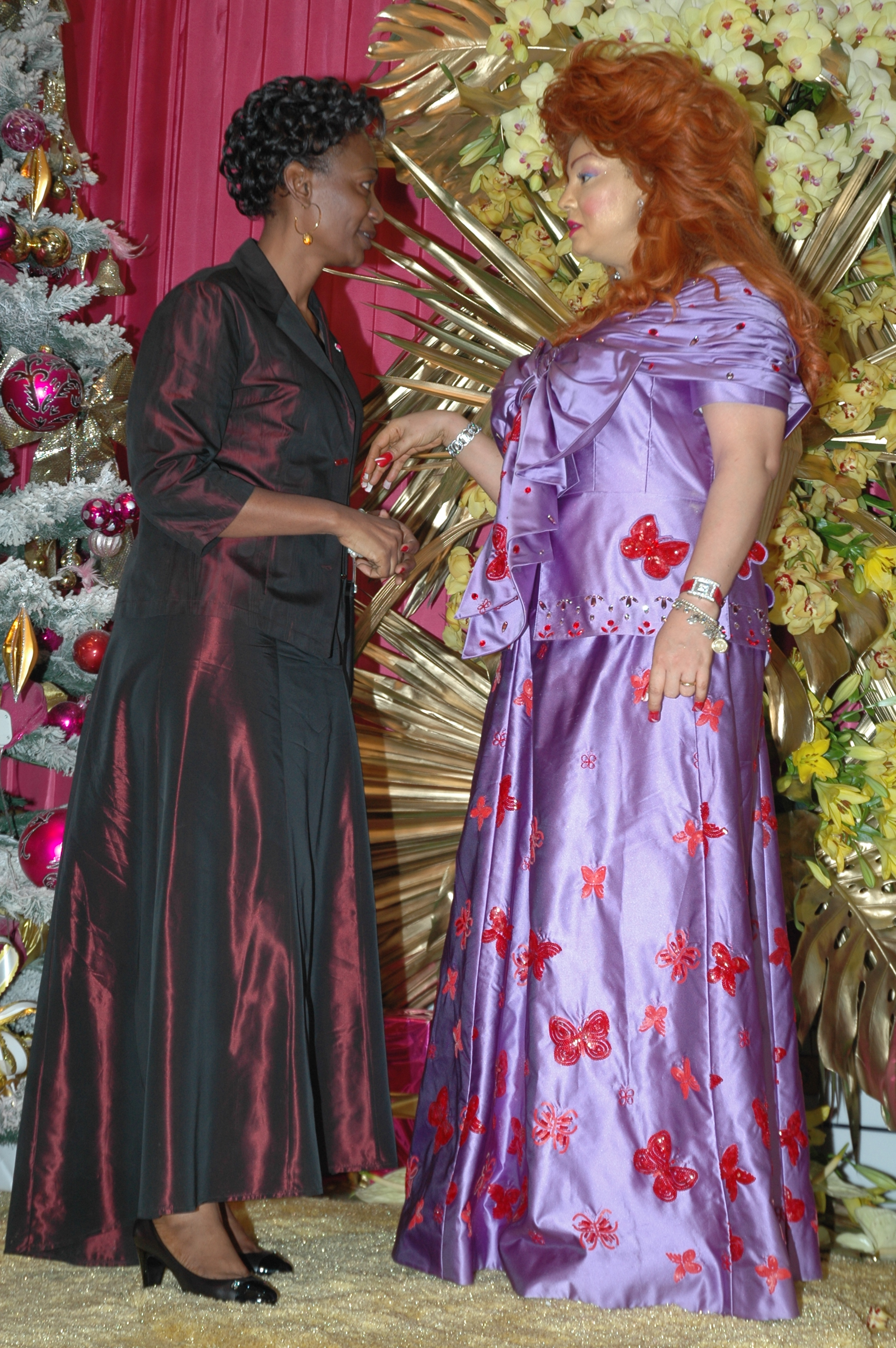
Chantal Biya receiving greetings from the Police Commissioner of Cameroon, Dr. Cecile Oyono in 2012

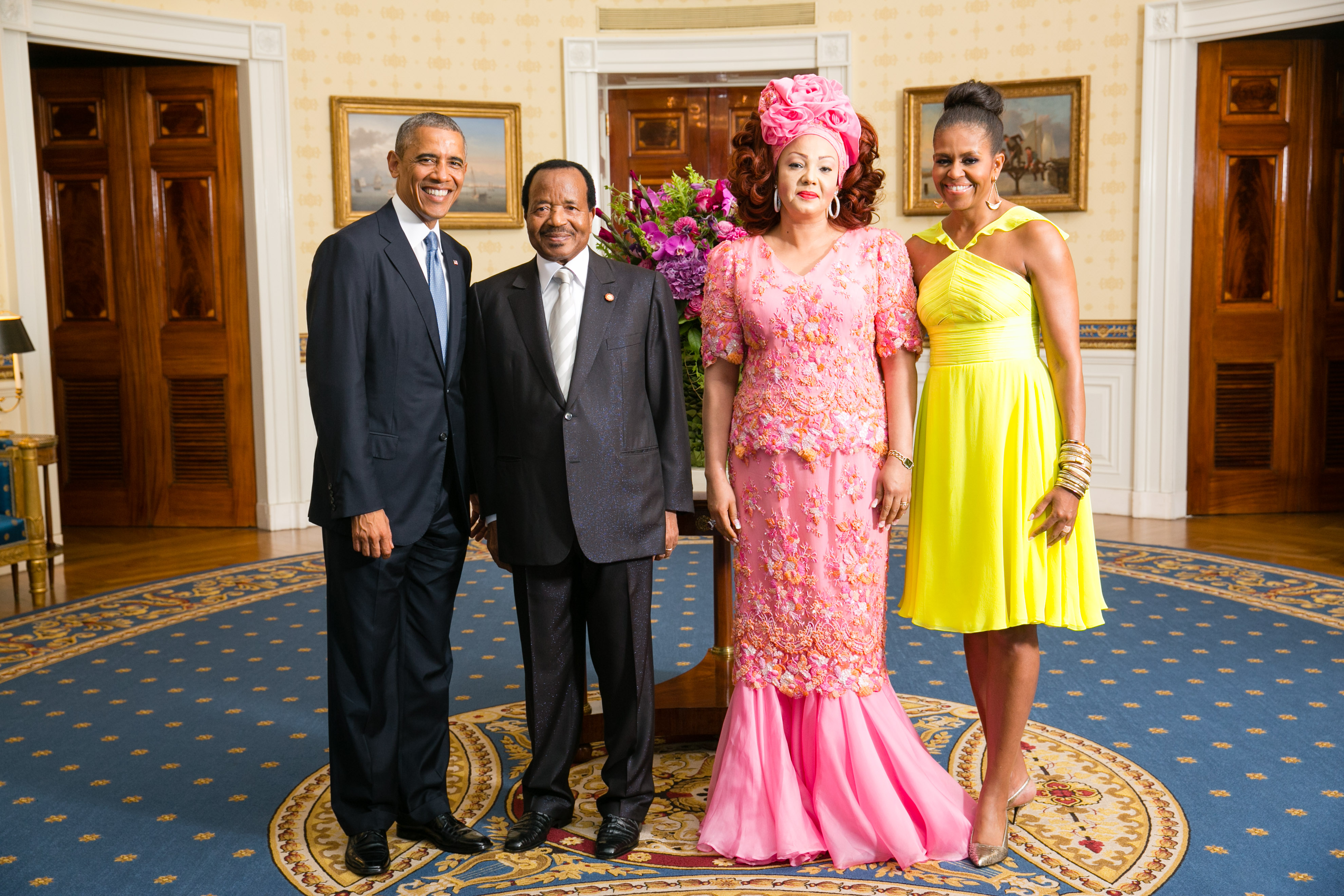
The Obamas with Chantal and Paul Biya, 2014

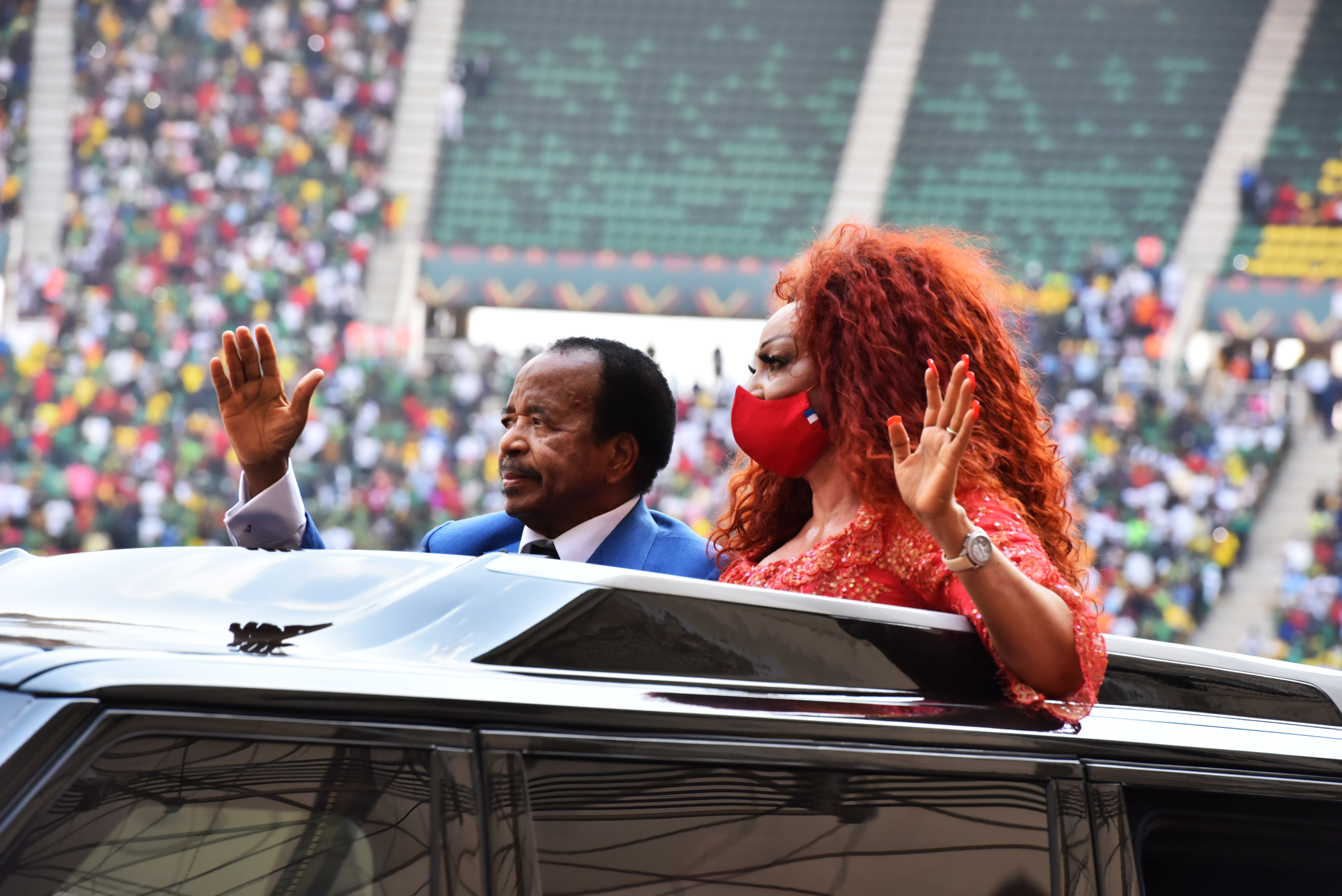
Paul and Chantal Biya aboard the presidential vehicle at Olembé Paul Biya Stadium, 2022

== Bibliography ==
- Andrews-Dyer, Helena (4 August 2014), "The first lady of Cameroon and her hair have touched down in D.C.", The Washington Post, Reliable Source, archived from the original on 12 October 2015.
- Dorall, Charyl, ed. (2004). Commonwealth Ministers Reference Book 2003. Commonwealth Secretariat.
- F., M. (2007), "Bangou : La mère de Chantal Biya élue maire" [Bangou: Chantal Biya's mother elected mayor], Quotidien Mutations (in French), Yaoundé, Cameroon: South Media Corporation, archived from the original on 8 February 2012.
- G'nowa, Hermann Oswald (19 April 2008), "L'unique fille de Paul Biya fait ses études primaires en Suisse", Cameroun Online (in French), archived from the original on 26 September 2008.
- Ibrahim, Jibrin (2003), Democratic Transition in Anglophone West Africa (PDF), Monograph, Dakar, Senegal: CODESRIA, ISBN 978-2-86978-122-1, LCCN 2006406193, OCLC 55051309, OL 8986042M, archived (PDF) from the original on 27 September 2007.
- Lees, Kevin A. (2014), "The Story Behind the Hair: Contemporary, Repressive Cameroon", HuffPost, OCLC 268958614, archived from the original on 6 July 2015
- Mitchell, Tamsin (2011a), Writers in Prison Committee: Cameroon: Author jailed for insulting President's wife, London, England: PEN International, archived from the original on 6 December 2015.
- Mitchell, Tamsin (2011b), Writers in Prison Committee: Cameroon: Author Jailed for Insult Released, London, England: PEN International, archived from the original on 15 December 2013, "PEN International welcomes the release of author Bertrand Teyou on 29 April 2011 after almost six months in prison for allegedly insulting the President's wife in a book he published [in 2010].... Teyou was freed from New Bell prison in Douala on 19 April 2011 after a well‑wisher paid the fine".
- Morikang, Tche Irene (2008), "Cameroon: Revisiting the Extraordinary Life of Chantal Biya", Cameroon Tribune – via AllAfrica, "From her birth in Dimako, through her life as an adolescent in [Yaoundé]..."
- Ngwane, Mwalimu George (2004), "Cameroon's Democratic Process: Vision 2020" (PDF), CODESRIA Bulletin, no. 3/4, Dakar, Senegal: Council for the Development of Social Science Research in Africa, ISSN 0850-8712, OCLC 774525259, archived (PDF) from the original on 5 February 2012.
- Nyamnjoh, Francis B.; Durham, Deborah; Fokwang, Jude D. (2002), "The Domestication of Hair and Modernised Consciousness in Cameroon: A Critique in the Context of Globalisation" (PDF), Identity, Culture and Politics: An Afro‑Asian Dialogue, vol. 3, no. 2, pp. 98–124, ISSN 0851-2914, OCLC 774633458, archived (PDF) from the original on 21 February 2006.
- Teyou, Bertrand (2010), La belle de la république bananière : Chantal Biya, de la rue au palais [The belle of the banana republic: Chantal Biya, from the streets to the palace] (in French), Douala, Cameroon: Nation libre, LCCN 2011342343, OCLC 707023206, OL 24833906M.

Honorary titles
Preceded by Jeanne-Irène Biya	First Lady of Cameroon; 1994–present	Incumbent
