= Mvomeka'a =

- Location in Cameroon
- Coordinates: 3°7′12″N 12°16′18″E
- Country: Cameroon
- Province: South Province
- Department: Dja-et-Lobo
- Communes: Meyomessala

Mvomeka'a is a village near Sangmélima, in Meyomessala subdivision, Dja-et-Lobo department, South Province, Cameroon. It is mostly known for being the birthplace of the current President Paul Biya.

It is located 500 kilometres (310 mi) northeast of Sangmélima, the departmental capital, on the road that connects Ndjom to Zoumeyo.

== Population ==
In 1962, it had 274 inhabitants, mainly of the Boulou ethnic group. According to the 2005 census, 4,054 people were counted there.

== Economy ==
In 2015, a mini-solar power plant of 293 photovoltaic panels and 93 streetlights, with a production capacity of 73 kW of electrical energy per day and a total cost of 454 million CFA francs, was donated to Mvomeka'a by Chinese firm Huawei, as part of a vast rural electrification program that is expected to benefit 1,000 Cameroonian localities in the long term.
