= Dimako =

Dimako, East, Cameroon Dimako, Est, Cameroun
- Village
- Location in Cameroon
- Coordinates: 4°23′N 13°34′E
- Country: Cameroon
- Province: Eastern Province

Dimako is the name of a sub-division district and small town situated in Upper Nyong Division of the East Province of Cameroon, Africa. It lies a little way south of East Province capital of Bertoua. The local language is Kwakum, spoken by the population of around 10,000.

National Road 10 passes through Dimako. Due to the humid mosquito- and black fly-infested forests, the area sees little tourism.

It is mostly known for being the birthplace of the current first lady Chantal Biya.

== Forestry ==
There are several attempts at developing sustainable tropical rain forest forestry projects in the area, including the Dimako Council Forest.

Illegal and indiscriminate logging is a problem in the area, and especially in natural forest stands.

Rougier Ocean operate a veneer and plywood factory at Dimako. This and other wood processing factories have attracted immigration to the sparsely populated area.

== See also ==
- Communes of Cameroon
