= Endom =

Coordinates: 4°06′N 12°32′E

- Commune and town
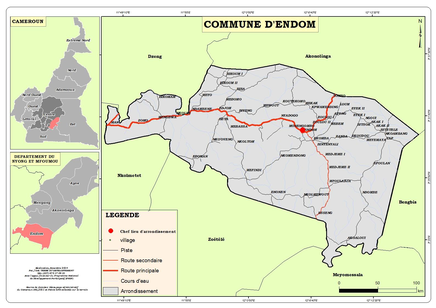
- Map of Endom
- Interactive map of Endom
- Country: Cameroon
- Time zone: UTC+1 (WAT)

Endom is a town and commune in Cameroon.

== See also ==
- Communes of Cameroon
