= Bisola Biya =

Nigerian author (born 1992)

- Born: Abisola Esther Biya; 21 December 1992; Lagos State, Nigeria
- Education: Aston University, Cranfield University
- Occupation: Writer

Bisola Biya (born Abisola Esther Biya on 21 December 1992 in Lagos) is a Nigerian-Canadian author. Her book "Life Lessons… My Path to Happiness" was published on the 24th of March, 2018 by Parrésia Publishers, Nigeria, and has been described as "a timely expression of Nigeria's socio-economic reality, with viable advice on how to counter the demons of contemporary society and achieve all -round intelligence."

She is also an environmental activist and has helped in raising the awareness of plastic pollution in Nigeria."

."

Bisola was born to Wale and Clara Biya in Lagos, where she spent most of her early years before moving to Ibadan for her teenage years. She then undertook further studies in the UK for schooling, earning both a bachelor's and master's degree in Business and Management.

Before returning to work in Lagos, Biya had worked in London and New York. In 2018, she released her debut book "Life Lessons…My Path to Happiness"(ISBN 9789785529432).

== Activism ==
Abisola is passionate about the environment and in 2019, she conveyed the Plastic SOS rally to help raise more awareness on plastic pollution in Nigeria, stating the need for urgent attention to this issue that was deteriorating while pushing for the backing of the government.

For her, it was about taking action no matter how minute before a catastrophe happened’."

== Personal life ==
Bisola Biya is the youngest of two children. Her sister Abimbola Biya-Ojo is a diplomat who resides in the US. Bisola currently lives in Toronto, Canada, but is never far away from Lagos, where she spent her childhood.
