= First Lady of Cameroon =

Spouse of the president of Cameroon

- Première dame du Cameroun

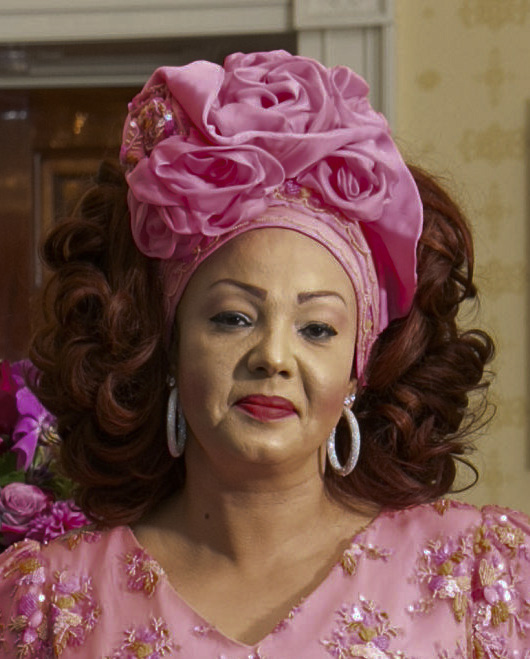
- Incumbent; Chantal Biya since 23 April 1994
- Inaugural holder: Germaine Ahidjo
- Formation: 1 January 1960

First Lady of the Republic of Cameroon (French: Première dama du Cameroun) refers to the wife of the president of Cameroon. Chantal Biya, the second wife of President Paul Biya, became First Lady upon her marriage to Biya on April 23, 1994.

== First ladies of Cameroon ==
No.	Portrait	Name	Term begins	Term ends	Time in office	President or Head of State	Notes
1		Germaine Ahidjo (1932–2021)	1 January 1960	6 November 1982	22 years, 309 days	Ahmadou Ahidjo (1924–1989)	Inaugural First Lady of Cameroon
2		Jeanne-Irène Biya (1935–1992)	6 November 1982	29 July 1992 (Note: Died in office)	9 years, 266 days	Paul Biya (1933–)	Jeanne-Irène Biya died in Yaoundé on 29 July 1992
Office Vacant			29 July 1992	23 April 1994	1 year, 268 days	Paul Biya (1933–)	Biya was a widower following the death of Jeanne-Irène
3		Chantal Biya (1969–)	23 April 1994 (Marriage)	Present	32 years, 137 days	Paul Biya (1933–)	Chantal Biya married President Biya on 23 April 1994
