= Paul Biya =

President of Cameroon since 1982

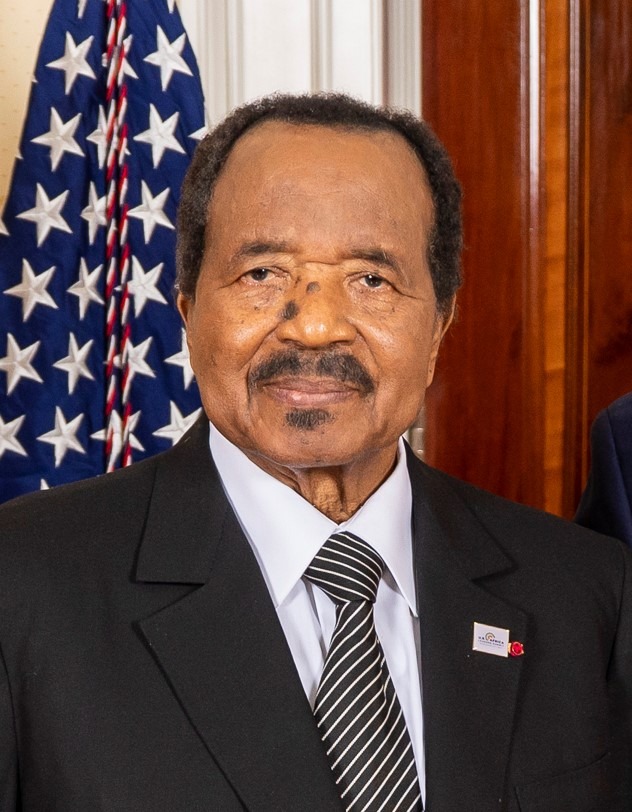
- Biya in 2022

2nd President of Cameroon
- Incumbent
- Assumed office 6 November 1982
- Prime Minister: Bello Bouba Maigari; Luc Ayang; Sadou Hayatou; Simon Achidi Achu; Peter Mafany Musonge; Ephraïm Inoni; Philémon Yang; Joseph Ngute
- Vice President: Vacant
- Preceded by: Ahmadou Ahidjo

5th Prime Minister of Cameroon
- In office 30 June 1975 – 6 November 1982
- President: Ahmadou Ahidjo
- Preceded by: Office re-established; Simon Pierre Tchoungui and Salomon Tandeng Muna (1972)
- Succeeded by: Bello Bouba Maigari

Personal details
- Born: Paul Barthélemy Biya'a bi Mvondo; 13 February 1933 (age 93) Mvomeka'a, French Cameroon
- Party: RDPC
- Spouses: Jeanne-Irène Ndoumin (m. 1961; died 1992); Chantal Vigouroux (m. 1994)
- Children: 3, including Franck and Brenda
- Education: National School of Administration, Paris; Institute of Political Studies, Paris
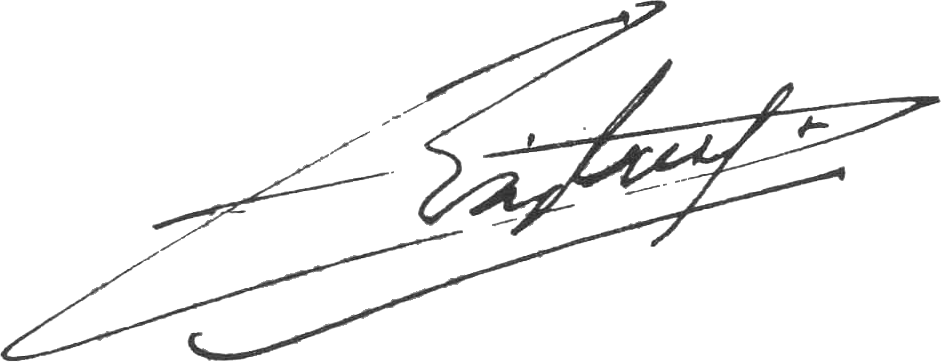
- Signature

Paul Barthélemy Biya (né Biya'a bi Mvondo, (Note: French pronunciation: [pɔl baʁtelemi bja.a bi mvɔ̃do]) born 13 February 1933) is a Cameroonian politician who has been serving as the second president of Cameroon since 1982. He was previously the fifth prime minister under President Ahmadou Ahidjo from 1975 to 1982. Widely considered to be a dictator, Biya is the second-longest-ruling president in Africa (after Teodoro Obiang Nguema Mbasogo in Equatorial Guinea) and the longest consecutively serving current non-royal national leader in the world; at the age of 93, he is also the oldest current head of state in the world.

A native of Cameroon’s south, Biya rose rapidly as a bureaucrat under President Ahmadou Ahidjo in the 1960s, as Secretary-General of the Presidency from 1968 to 1975 and then as prime minister. He succeeded Ahidjo as president upon the latter's surprise resignation in 1982 and consolidated power after an attempted coup in 1984, eliminating his major rivals.

Biya introduced the political reforms within the context of a one-party system in the 1980s, later accepting the introduction of multiparty politics in the early 1990s under serious pressure. He nevertheless leads an authoritarian regime in Cameroon, where his Cameroon People's Democratic Movement continues to rule the country as a de facto one-party state with little to no opposition. He won the contentious 1992 presidential election with 40% of the plurality, single-ballot vote and was re-elected by large margins in 1997, 2004, 2011, 2018, and 2025. Opposition politicians and Western governments have alleged voting irregularities and fraud on each of these occasions. It is widely believed that the 1992 election was manipulated in his favor, and domestic and international observers have documented evidence of systemic electoral fraud in parliamentary and presidential elections under his administration.

== Early life and education ==
Ethnically Beti, Paul Biya was born in the village of Mvomeka'a in what is now the South Region of Cameroon. He studied at the Lycée General Leclerc, Yaoundé, and in France at the Lycée Louis-le-Grand, Paris, going on to the Institut des hautes études d'Outre-Mer, where he graduated in 1961 with a higher education diploma in public law.

== Early career ==
As a Chargé de Mission in post-independence 1960s Cameroon, Biya rose to prominence under President Ahmadou Ahidjo. After becoming director of the Cabinet of the minister of national education in January 1964 and secretary-general of the ministry of national education in July 1965, he was named director of the civil cabinet of the president in December 1967 and secretary-general of the presidency (while remaining director of the civil cabinet) in January 1968. He gained the rank of minister in August 1968 and the rank of minister of state in June 1970, while remaining secretary-general of the presidency.

== Leadership (1975–present) ==
=== Premiership (1975–1982) ===
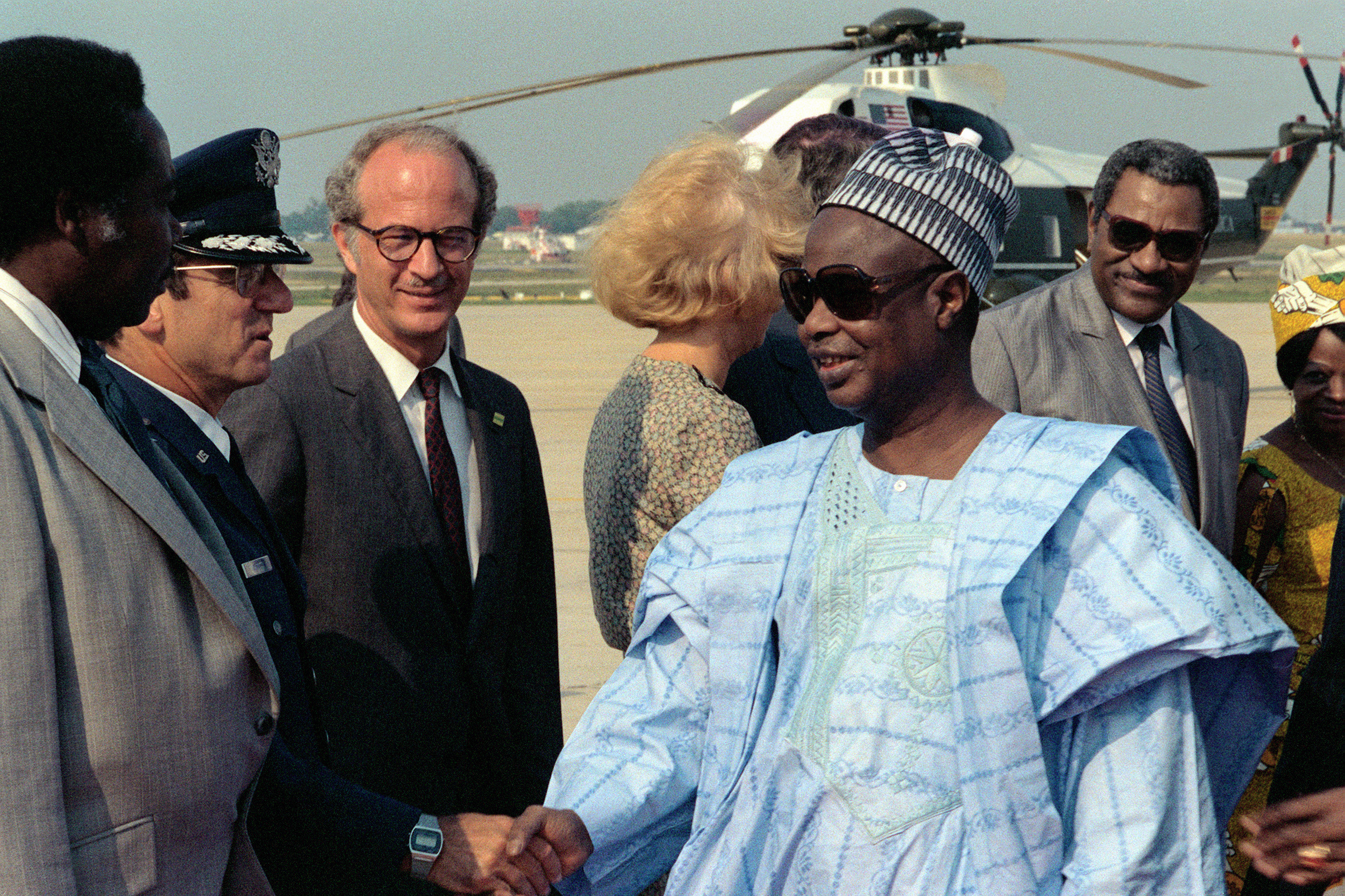
Ahidjo in July 1982, three months before he resigned.

Following the creation of a unitary state in 1972, Biya was appointed prime minister by President Ahidjo on 30 June 1975. Because Biya is a Catholic from the southern region of Cameroon, it was considered surprising that he was chosen by Ahidjo, a Muslim from the north, as his successor. Biya's father, who was a catechist, wanted him to join the clergy, but at the age of 16 he was expelled from Catholic school.

In June 1979, a new law designated the prime minister as the president's constitutional successor, which entailed Biya as the legal successor to Ahidjo should the presidency become vacant intra-term. Ahidjo announced his resignation on 4 November 1982 and Biya became president two days later on 6 November.

=== Presidency (1982–present) ===
After Biya became president, Ahidjo initially remained head of the ruling Cameroon National Union (CNU/ UNC). Biya was brought into the CNU Central Committee and Political Bureau and was elected as the vice-president of the CNU. On 11 December 1982, he was placed in charge of managing party affairs in Ahidjo's absence.

During the first months after Biya's succession, he continued to show loyalty to Ahidjo, and Ahidjo continued to show support for Biya, but in 1983, a deep rift developed between the two. Ahidjo went into exile in France, and from there, he publicly accused Biya of abuse of power and paranoia about plots against him. After Ahidjo resigned as CNU leader, Biya took the helm of the party at an "extraordinary session" of the CNU party held on 14 September 1983.

In November 1983, Biya announced that the next presidential election would be held on 14 January 1984; it had been previously scheduled for 1985. He was the sole candidate in this election and won 99.98% of the vote. In February 1984, Ahidjo was put on trial in absentia for alleged involvement in a 1983 coup plot, along with two others; they were sentenced to death, although Biya commuted their sentences to life in prison. Biya survived a military coup attempt on 6 April 1984, following his decision on the previous day to disband the Republican Guard and disperse its members across the military. Estimates of the death toll ranged from 71 (according to the government) to about 1,000. Northern Muslims were the primary participants in this coup attempt, which was seen by many as an attempt to restore that group's supremacy. Biya, however, chose to emphasize national unity and did not focus blame on northern Muslims. Ahidjo was widely believed to have orchestrated the coup attempt, and Biya is thought to have learned of the plot in advance and to have disbanded the Republican Guard in response, forcing the coup plotters to act earlier than they had planned, which may have been a crucial factor in the coup's failure.

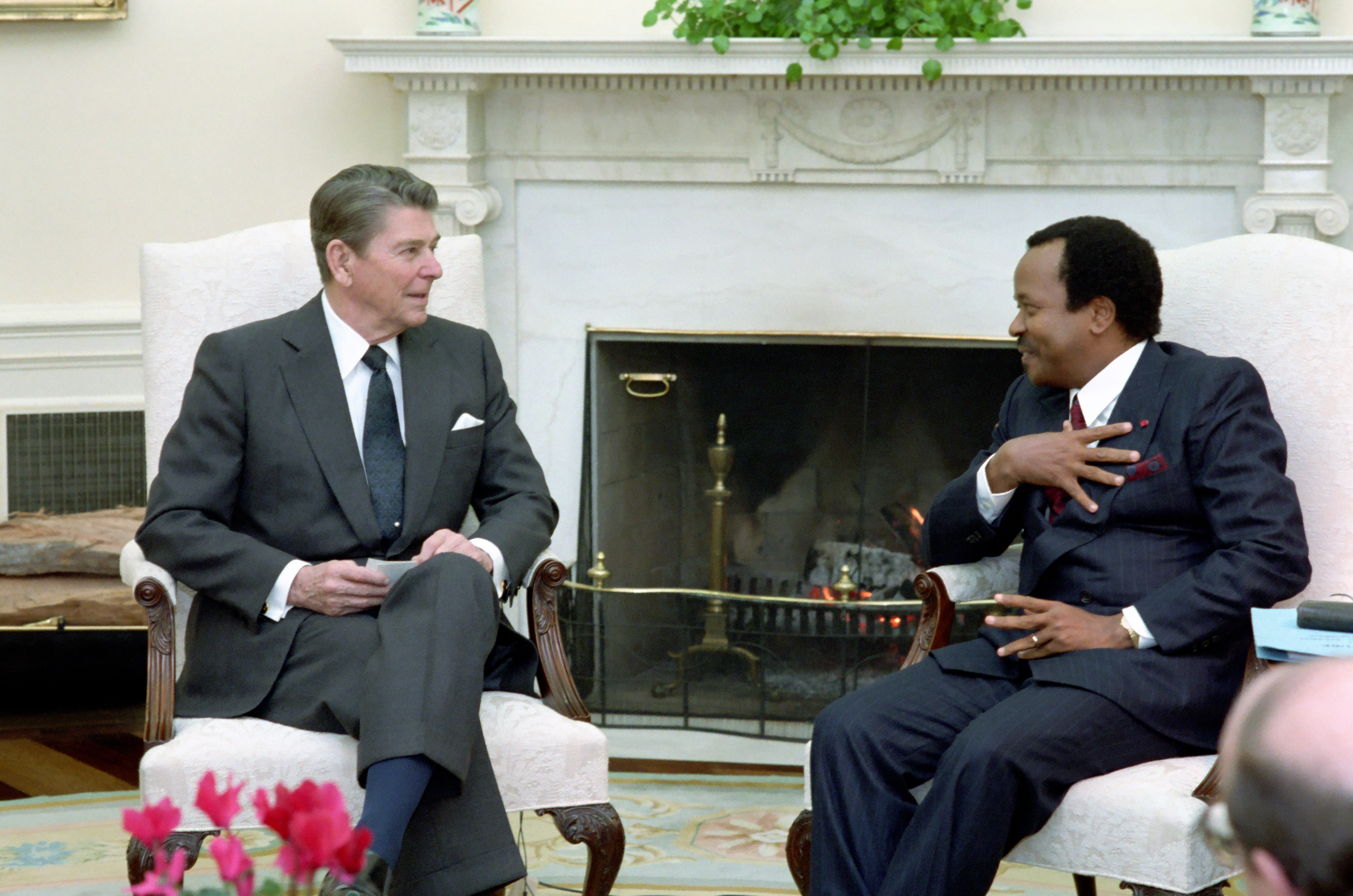
Biya with U.S. president Ronald Reagan in 1986

Under his rule, the country adopted a structural adjustment plan submitted to it by the International Monetary Fund (IMF) and World Bank, which involved privatization, opening up to competition, and reducing social spending. Civil servants' salaries were reduced by 60%, and the informal sector increased very significantly.

In 1985, the CNU was transformed into the Cameroon People's Democratic Movement, in Bamenda and Biya was unlawfully elected as its president. He was also re-elected as President of Cameroon on 24 April 1988.

Biya initially took some steps to open up the regime, culminating in the decision to legalize opposition parties in 1990. According to official results, Biya won the first multiparty presidential election, held on 11 October 1992, with about 40% of the vote. There was no provision for a runoff; the opposition was unable to unite around a single candidate. The second placed candidate, John Fru Ndi of the opposition Social Democratic Front (SDF), officially received about 36%. The results were strongly disputed by the opposition, which alleged fraud.

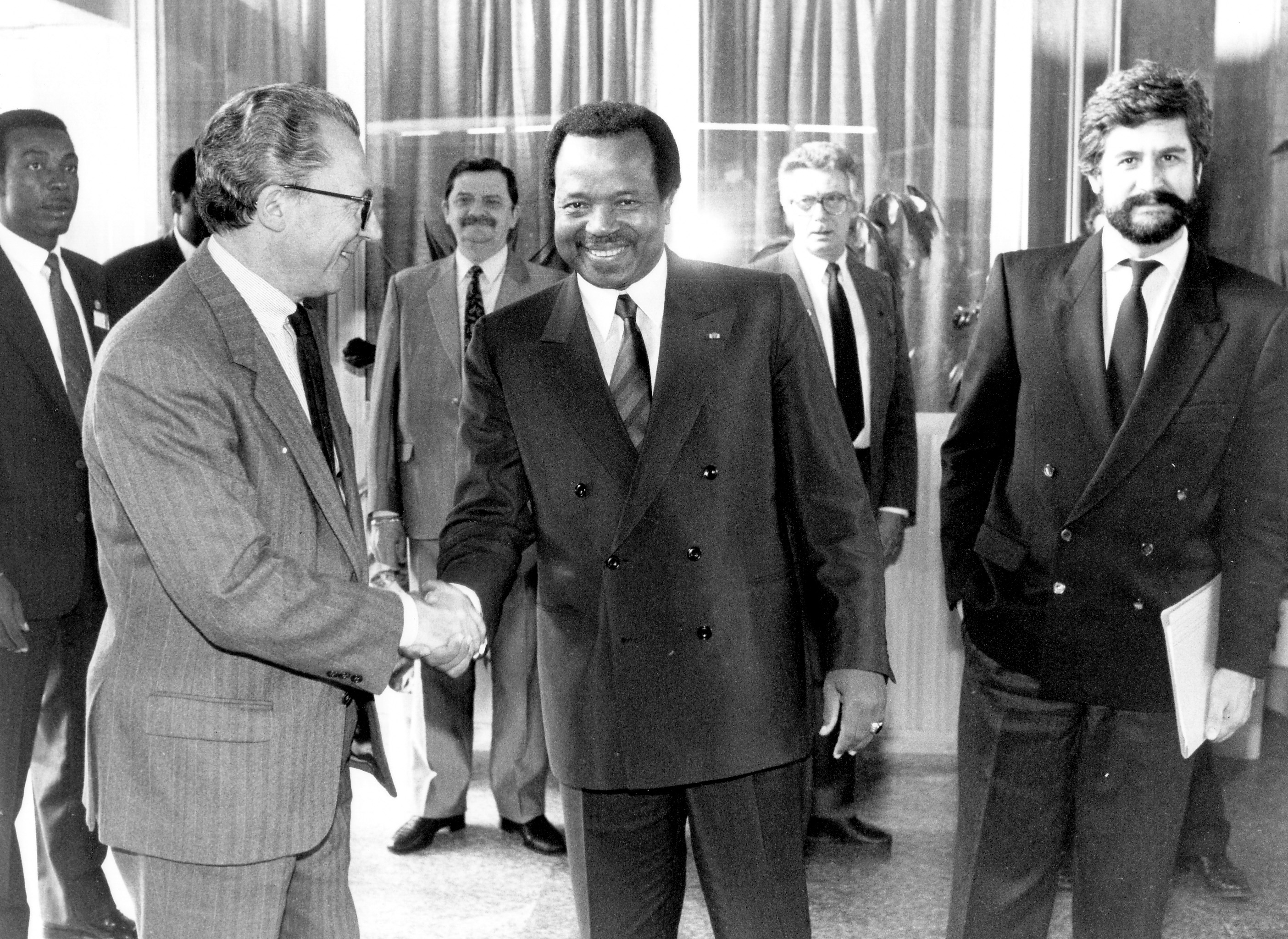
Biya with President of the European Commission Jacques Delors (left) and Manuel Marín (right) in 1989

In the October 1997 presidential election, which was boycotted by the main opposition parties, Biya was re-elected with 92.6 percent of the vote; he was sworn in on 3 November.

He has been consistently re-elected as the National President of the RDPC; he was re-elected at the party's second extraordinary congress on 7 July 2001 and its third extraordinary congress on 21 July 2006.

Biya won another seven-year term in the 11 October 2004 presidential election, officially taking 70.92 percent of the vote, although the opposition again alleged widespread fraud. Biya was sworn in on 3 November.

After being re-elected in 2004, Biya was barred by a two-term limit in the 1996 Constitution from running for president again in 2011; however, he sought to revise this, to allow him to run again. In his 2008 New Year's message, Biya expressed support for revising the Constitution, saying that it was undemocratic to limit the people's choice. The proposed removal of term limits was among the grievances expressed during violent protests in late February 2008. Nevertheless, on 10 April 2008, the National Assembly voted to change the Constitution to remove term limits. Given the RDPC's control of the National Assembly, the change was overwhelmingly approved, with 157 votes in favor and five opposed; the 15 deputies of the SDF chose to boycott the vote in protest. The change also provided for the President to enjoy immunity from prosecution for his actions as president after leaving office.

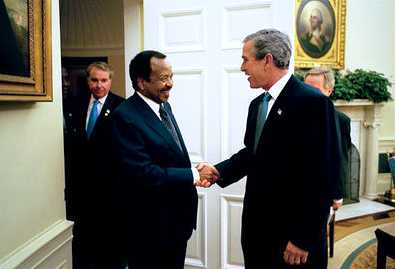
Biya with U.S. president George W. Bush in 2003

On 12 June 2006, he signed the Greentree Agreement with Nigerian president Olusegun Obasanjo which formally put an end to the Bakassi peninsula border dispute.

In February 2008, riots broke out, calling for lower prices and the departure of Paul Biya as president. The demonstrators were severely repressed with reports of a hundred dead and thousands of arrests.

In the October 2011 presidential election, Biya secured a sixth term in office, polling 77.9% of votes cast. John Fru Ndi was his nearest rival, polling 10%. Biya's opponents alleged wide-scale fraud in the election and procedural irregularities were noted by the French and US governments. In his victory speech, Biya promised to stimulate growth and create jobs with a programme of public works which would "transform our country into a vast construction site". On 3 November 2011, he was sworn in for another term as president.

Biya won the 2018 presidential election with 71.3% of the vote. The election was marred by violence and low voter turnout.

In July 2025, Biya filed his candidacy for an eighth term in the 2025 Cameroonian presidential election scheduled in October. On 27 October, the Constitutional Council announced that Biya was re-elected for an 8th consecutive term. In the aftermath of the election, a series of protests broke out after allegations of electoral fraud were made by the opposition. Biya was inaugurated for his eighth term on 6 November as protests continued. Biya's opponent in the election, Issa Tchiroma, had fled the country to the Gambia right after his inauguration amid threats from his government.

=== Foreign relations ===
==== France ====
Biya's regime is supported by France, one of the former colonial powers in Cameroon, which supplies it with weapons and trains its military forces. France is also the leading foreign investor in Cameroon. The move has been criticised by many, especially Pan-Africanists, accusing France of playing neocolonialism with Cameroon and also accusing Biya of being a French puppet.

==== China ====
In the 2000s, leading politicians paid state visits to and from each country; these included President Biya's visit for a conference in 2006 and Hu Jintao's visit to Cameroon in 2007.

Chinese foreign minister Wang Yi visited Cameroon on 12 January 2014.

Cameroon was one of 53 countries that, in June 2020, backed the Hong Kong national security law at the United Nations.

==== Israel ====
Biya resumed diplomatic relations with Israel in 1986, after a 13-year lapse due to the Yom Kippur War, making Cameroon one of the first African states to restore relations.

Cameroon has voted against several anti-Israel UN resolutions, and was the only nation to join Israel in voting against the UN resolution "Assistance to Palestine Refugees". The government uses Israeli armored vehicles, and Cameroon's Rapid Reaction Force, (often referred to by its French acronym BIR) is equipped and trained by Israel. Israelis also trained personnel at six hospitals in Cameroon on how to combat the Ebola virus. Students in Cameroon were granted 11 month visas to travel to Israel and learn about agriculture, while poultry farmers underwent training for poultry production in Israel.

Biya expressed his "sincere condolences" to Israeli president Isaac Herzog following the October 7 attacks in southern Israel.

==== Nigeria ====
Biya filed suit at the International Court of Justice on 29 March 1994. Cameroon's claim to Bakassi was largely based on the Anglo-German agreement of 1913 and the 1975 Maroua Declaration. Nigeria, on the other hand, argued that the peninsula had been the territory of the chiefs of Old Calabar, who had transferred their title to Nigeria upon its independence. As support for this argument it pointed to the Nigerian collection of taxes in the region, the widespread use of Nigerian passports by its residents, and other signs that the Nigerian state had been intimately involved in the governance of the peninsula. On 10 October 2002, after more than eight years of hearings and deliberations, the court ruled in favour of Cameroon, instructing Nigeria to withdraw immediately from the region.

Although Nigeria initially protested the decision, and although it caused significant unrest in Bakassi, the Nigerian government largely cooperated with the ruling. In June 2006, at the Greentree estate in Long Island, New York, the countries signed the Greentree Agreement, which required Nigeria to withdraw its troops from Bakassi by 4 August 2008, and also required Cameroon to protect the rights of the Nigerian citizens who lived in Bakassi. The transfer of the territory to Cameroon proceeded peacefully under the agreement. The Cameroonian government now presents the dispute as a "misunderstanding", and its resolution as "a model of peaceful conflict resolution in Africa."

At the request of Biya and Nigerian president Olusegun Obasanjo, UN Secretary-General Kofi Annan established the Cameroon–Nigeria Mixed Commission to negotiate a smooth implementation of the International Court of Justice's 2002 ruling. The commission's responsibilities included demarcating the entirety of the Cameroon–Nigeria border, facilitating cross-border cooperation and troop withdrawals from Bakassi, and protecting the rights of locals. The commission was chaired by Mohamed Ibn Chambas and had met 38 times by 2015. As of July 2019, 2,001 kilometres of boundary (out of an estimated 2,100 kilometres) had been surveyed and agreed to by both countries, including the border at Bakassi. In May 2007 in Abuja, the commission finalised the maritime boundary, but in 2015, the Cameroonian government reported that "a few tens of kilometres remain[ed] a stumbling block" in finalising the land boundary.

==== United States ====
Cameroon–U.S. economic relations were at their highest ever level in 1982, when Ahidjo was replaced by his prime minister, Biya. Between 1982 and 1984, the U.S. overtook France as Cameroon's foremost export market, primarily due to its consumption of Cameroonian oil. Biya pursued a diversification of Cameroonian foreign relations still more vigorously than Ahidjo had, describing his foreign policy in such terms as "diplomacy of development", "co-operation without frontiers", and "open door" diplomacy.

From around 2013, bilateral relations increasingly emphasised joint counterterrorism actions against Boko Haram and Islamic State – West Africa Province, alongside other regional security initiatives, especially in the Gulf of Guinea. Between 2015 and 2020, about 300 U.S. military personnel were deployed in northern Cameroon to conduct regional intelligence, surveillance, and reconnaissance.

== Opposition and criticism ==
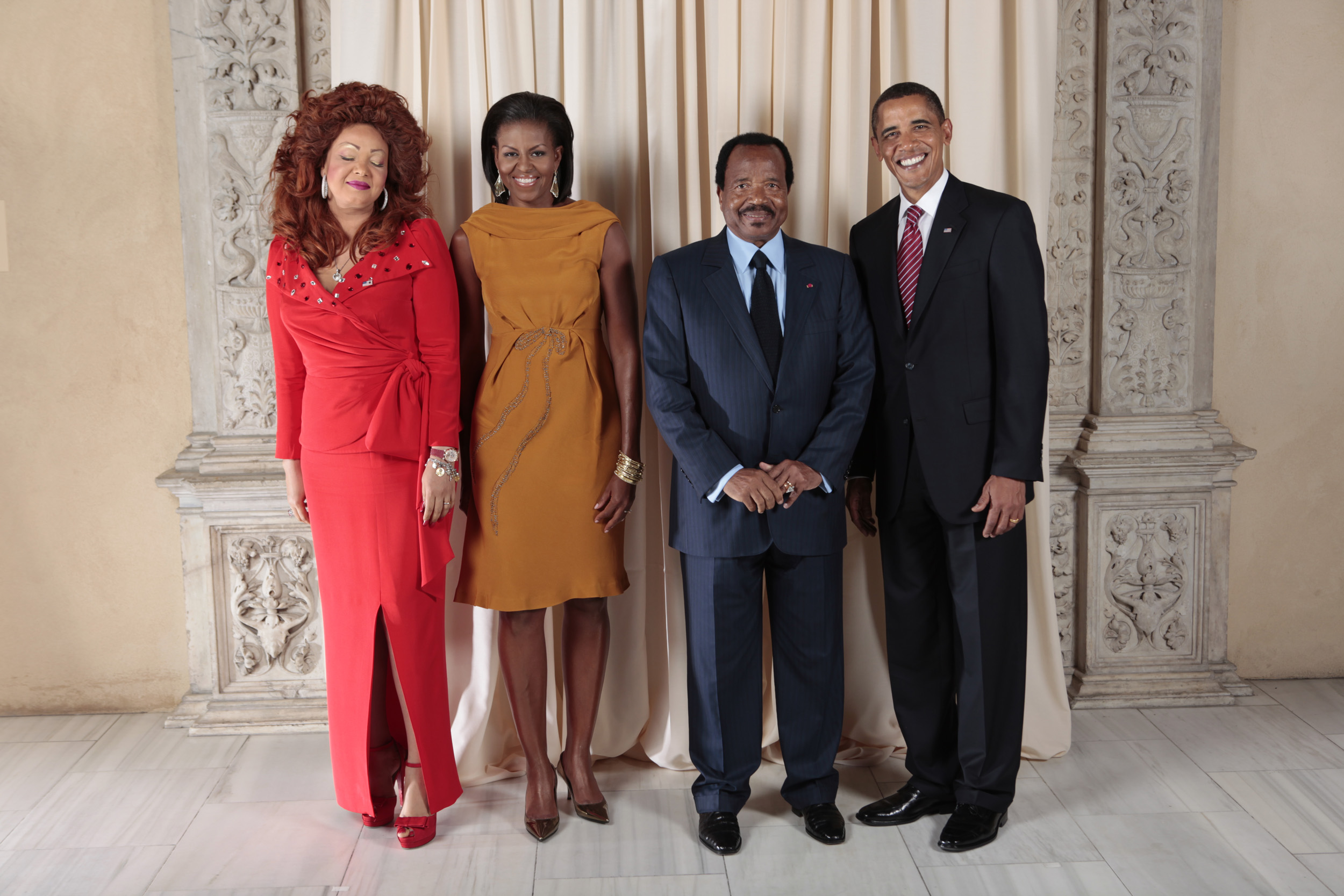
US president Barack Obama and First Lady Michelle Obama pose for a photo during a reception at the Metropolitan Museum in New York with Biya and his wife Chantal, 2009.

Biya makes relatively few public appearances, and is sometimes characterized as aloof. Since the early 1990s, he has faced his strongest opposition from the Anglophone population of the former Southern Cameroons in the western part of the country.

Although Biya made some efforts to open up the political environment, his regime still retains clear authoritarian characteristics and has largely bucked the trend toward democracy in Africa since the 1990s. Under the constitution, Biya has sweeping executive and legislative powers. He even has considerable authority over the judiciary; the courts can only review a law's constitutionality at his request. The RDPC continues to dominate the National Assembly, which does little more than approve his policies.

"Tyrants, the World's 20 Worst Living Dictators", by David Wallechinsky, ranked Biya together with three other leaders in sub-Saharan Africa: Robert Mugabe of Zimbabwe, Teodoro Obiang Nguema Mbasogo of Equatorial Guinea, and King Mswati III of Swaziland (now Eswatini). He describes Cameroon's electoral process in these terms: "Every few years, Biya stages an election to justify his continuing reign, but these elections have no credibility. In fact, Biya is credited with a creative innovation in the world of phony elections. In 2004, annoyed by the criticisms of international vote-monitoring groups, he paid for his own set of international observers, six ex-U.S. congressmen, who certified his election as free and fair." In a 2005 interview William Quantrill, a retired member of the British Diplomatic Service, argued that the reluctance of Biya to delegate responsibility seriously hampered the quality of governance, with trivial decisions often delayed until he got round to delivering them, and that there was too much government interference in the economy in general.

Biya regularly spends extended periods of time in Switzerland at the Hotel InterContinental Geneva where the former director Herbert Schott reportedly said he comes to work without being disturbed. These extended stays away from Cameroon – while sometimes as short as two weeks and sometimes as long as three months – are almost always referred to as "short stays" in the state-owned press and other media. In February 2008, he passed a bill that allows for having an additional term in office as president which was followed by civil unrests throughout the country. The main violent riots took place in the Western, English-speaking part of the country starting with a "strike" initiated by taxi drivers in Douala, allegedly causing more than 200 casualties in the end. In 2009, his holiday in France allegedly cost $40,000 a day spent on 43 hotel rooms.

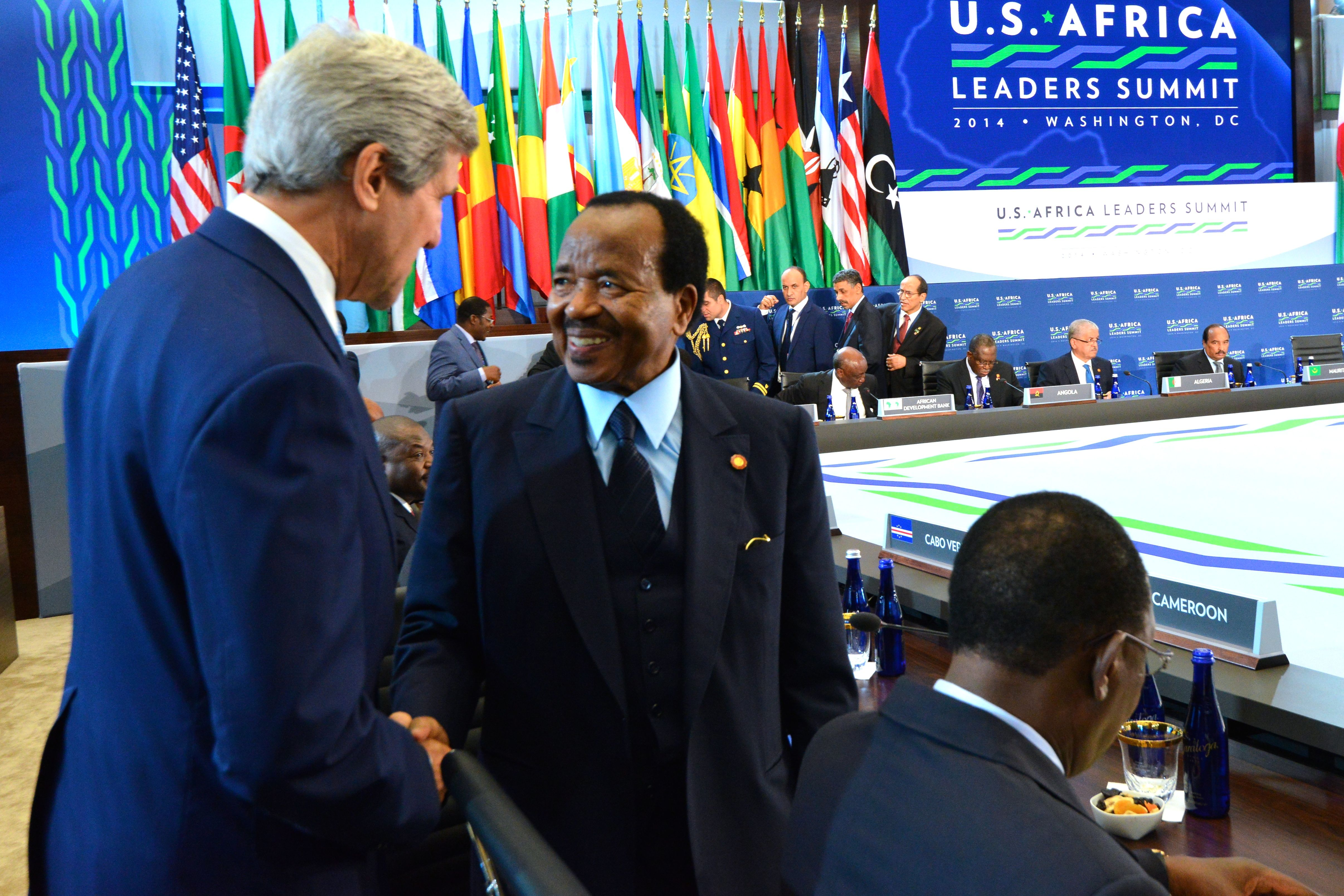
US Secretary of State John Kerry greets President Biya, 2014

In 2009, Biya was ranked 19th in Parade Magazine's Top 20 list of "The World's Worst Dictators".

In November 2010, Bertrand Teyou published a book titled La belle de la république bananière: Chantal Biya, de la rue au palais (English: "The beauty of the banana republic: Chantal Biya, from the streets to the palace"), tracing Chantal Biya's rise from humble origins to become Paul Biya's First Lady. He was subsequently given a two-year prison term on charges of "insult to character" and organizing an "illegal demonstration" for attempting to hold a public reading. Amnesty International and International PEN's Writers in Prison Committee both protested his arrest and issued appeals on his behalf; Amnesty International also named him a prisoner of conscience. He was freed on 2 May 2011 when the London chapter of International PEN agreed to pay his fine in order that he might seek treatment for his worsening health condition.

In February 2014, French citizen Michel Thierry Atangana was released from a makeshift Yaoundé prison where, under Biya's orders, he had been arbitrarily detained for 17 years under false claims of embezzlement because of supposed closeness to presidential candidate Titus Edzoa. Considered a political prisoner and prisoner of conscience by the United States Department of State, Amnesty International, Freedom House, and the U.N. Working Group on Arbitrary Detention since 2005, Michel was released under Biya's personal decree but the Working Group's tripartite demands remain unfulfilled.

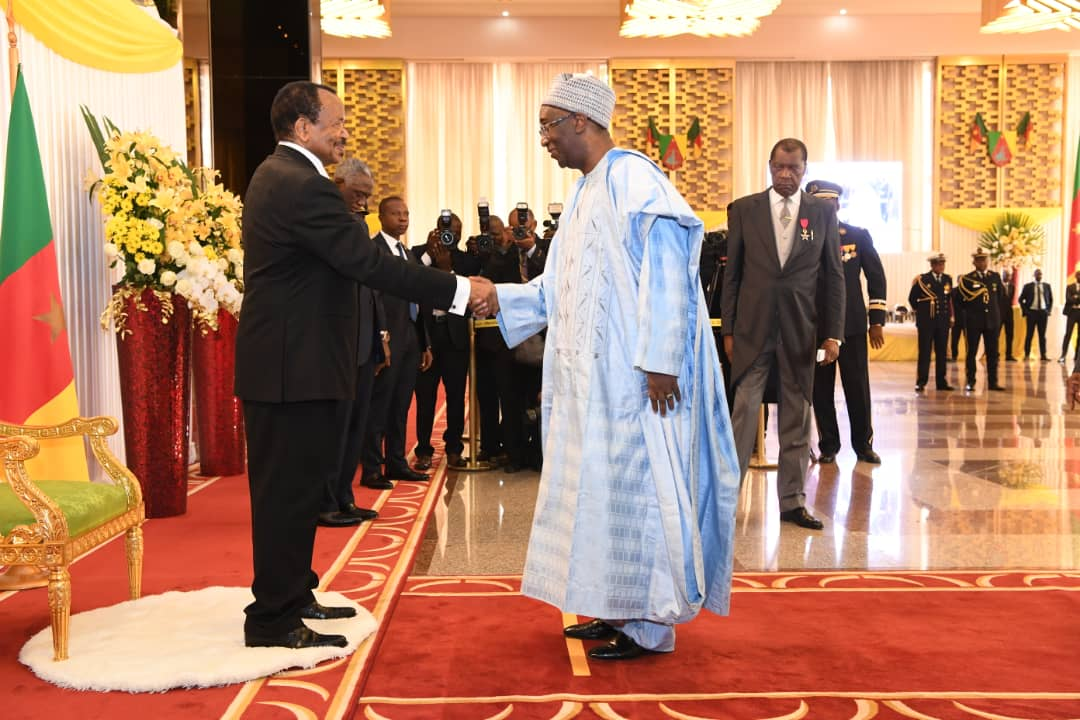
Bayero Fadil with Paul Biya, 2020

In 2016, Cameroonians in the nation's capital city of Yaoundé criticized Biya's reaction to the country's worst train crash in which 79 people died. Critics included government officials who remained anonymous, fearing a backlash. The Anglophone protests in late 2016 were led by English-speaking lawyers in protest against the use of French in Cameroonian courts, which led to violent clashes with police. Opposition party leader Edna Njilin of the Cameroon People's Party spoke out against the enforced use of French in the classroom. In January 2017, the government ordered a suspension of Internet services in the Northwest and Southwest provinces. Criticism of the suspension and increased opposition led to resumption of services in late April.

By June 2017, protests in Cameroon's English-speaking provinces and cities led to police responding with force, with four protesters killed and more than 100 arrested. International criticism has been levied at the United States for their lack of response to the growing Cameroonian crisis.

In April 2017, a Cameroonian journalist working for Radio France Internationale, Ahmed Abba, was sentenced to 10 years' imprisonment by a military tribunal for failing to report acts of terrorism. The judgement was severely criticized by human rights groups including Amnesty International.

On 7 November 2018, another Cameroonian journalist, Mimi Mefo, was arrested after reporting on social media that the Cameroonian military was behind the murder of an American missionary in the country, Charles Trumann, in October of that year. Mefo was charged with "publishing and propagating information that infringes on the territorial integrity of the Republic of Cameroon," but was released and charges were dropped on 12 November after her arrest was condemned by both local and international media groups.

In March 2024, the NGO Human Rights Watch (HRW) denounced “intense repression” by the Cameroonian government against the opposition, after the government of Paul Biya declared the grouping of its main parties in two platforms “illegal”.

=== Anglophone Cameroon ===
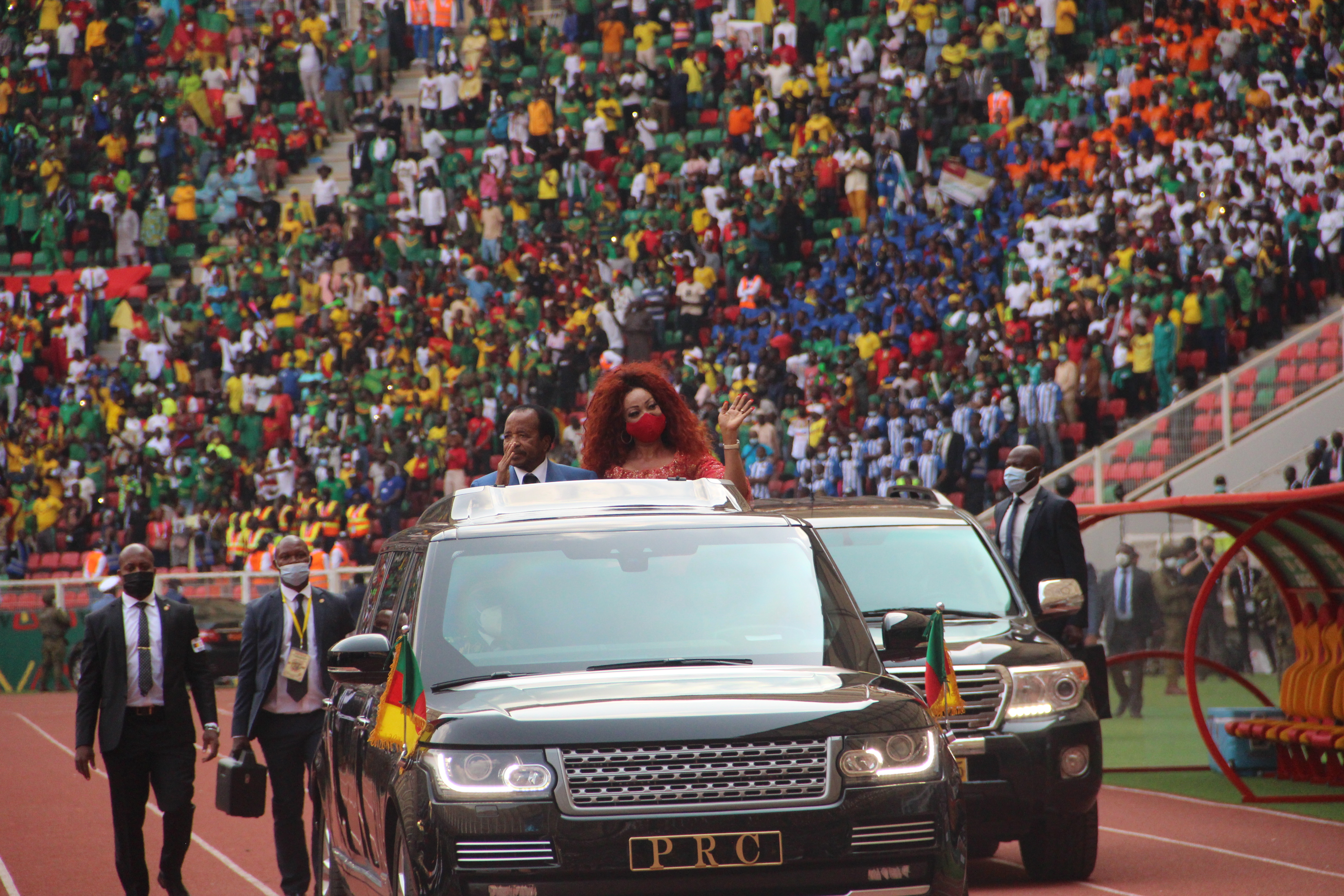
Biya and his wife Chantal at the opening of CAN 2021 in January 2022

During 2016 and 2017, under Biya's reign, large scale protests broke out among Anglophone Cameroonians in the area of the formerly British Southern Cameroons. Protestors complained that Anglophone regions in Cameroon (the Northwest Region and the Southwest Region) were neglected by Biya's government, and excluded from power. During this time, Anglophone separatists claim that government forces murdered protestors en masse, and committed crimes against humanity, including genocide. Certain protestors had called upon Biya and the Cameroonian government to grant them independence.

Eventually, separatists declared independence in October 2017 under the name Ambazonia. Civilians and activists have accused Biya's government forces of burning villages, raping women, extrajudicial killings of civilians, and acts of genocide. A petition to the United Nations gave details of police raping students at a university. In 2017, the National Commission for Human Rights and Freedoms embarked on a fact-finding mission in Buea to investigate allegations of human rights abuses in the region.

A June 2018 report by the BBC News found a widespread pattern of villages throughout the Southwest Region being burnt, including one video of men wearing government-issued BIR (Bataillon d'Intervention Rapide) equipment. The BIR is a special force body that reports directly to President Biya. The report also included a video of a man being tortured by men appearing to be Cameroonian gendarmes. Biya's Minister of Communication, Issa Tchiroma, responded by stating that anyone can use government equipment to commit false flag attacks, and said that Biya's government would investigate. Sources testify those sent to fight the secessionist militia are French-speaking, thus widening the linguistic division between local residents.

In November 2019, Biya admitted in a Paris forum of trying to assimilate former British Southern Cameroons into the majority Francophone system, formerly East Cameroon State but failed, due to identity differences, thus triggering the conflict.

== Personal life ==
Biya became a naturalized citizen of France when he studied there, but he later relinquished his French citizenship when he returned to Cameroon to serve in government positions. In 1961, he married Jeanne-Irène Biya, who did not have any children, though she adopted Franck Biya, who had been born in 1971 from a relationship between Biya and Jeanne-Irène's sister or niece. Franck Biya is seen as a possible successor of his father in the context of presidential elections scheduled for 2025. Jeanne-Irène Biya died on 29 July 1992 after a short illness while Paul Biya was attending a conference abroad. Rumors have it that she and several people close to her did not die of natural causes. Paul Biya married Chantal Vigouroux, who is 36 years his junior, on 23 April 1994, and has two more children with her: Paul Jr and Brenda Biya. Brenda Biya, who is also a LGBTQ activist, publicly revealed her same-sex relationship with Brazilian model Layyons Valença on 5 July 2024. She later stated that she hoped the post would change anti-LGBT laws in Cameroon. However, she deleted the post and broke up with Valença after explicit photographs of them were released without her consent on the Internet. She reportedly accused Valença of sharing the photographs "for the attention of social media followers and even extort money" on TikTok.

Biya has been involved in a number of European-based secret societies, among them freemasonry. He later shifted to Rosicrucianism, and was likely part of the Rosicrucian organization CIRCES, led by the French esotericist Raymond Bernard. Bernard was also his personal advisor; Biya gave him an allowance of several million francs, and gave the organization itself 40 million francs for Bernard's services.

=== Health ===
As of 2026, Biya is the longest serving non-royal head of state, having been in power since 6 November 1982. Due to his advanced age, there has been ongoing speculation about his health and potential succession. In October 2024, the government dismissed rumors of his death after his absence from public events since the previous month raised concerns. Officials clarified that he was in Geneva and in good health. On 9 October, the Minister of Territorial Administration Paul Atanga Nji banned media outlets in the country from discussing the president's health. On 21 October, Biya was shown on state television arriving at Yaoundé Nsimalen International Airport following his return from Switzerland.

== See also ==
- List of current heads of state and government
- List of heads of the executive by approval rating

== Notes ==
Political offices
Preceded by Simon Pierre Tchoungui as Prime Minister of East Cameroon	Prime Minister of Cameroon; 1975–1982	Succeeded by Bello Bouba Maigari
Preceded by Salomon Tandeng Muna as Prime Minister of West Cameroon	Prime Minister of Cameroon; 1975–1982	Succeeded by Bello Bouba Maigari
Preceded by Ahmadou Ahidjo	President of Cameroon; 1982–present	Incumbent
