= Ama Tutu Muna =

Cameroonian politician

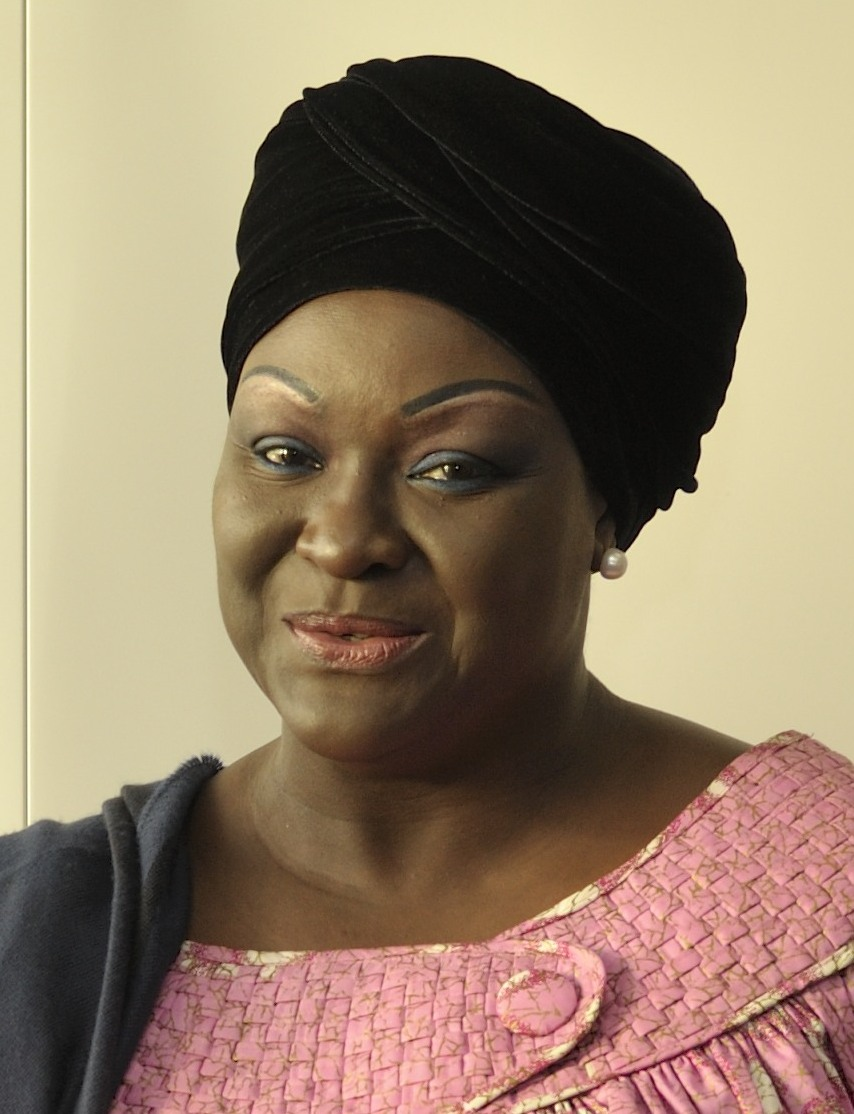
- Ama Tutu Muna in 2012
- Born: 1960/07/17; Limbe, Southwest Province of Cameroon
- Citizenship: Cameroon
- Education: University Degree
- Alma mater: University of Montreal
- Occupation: Politician
- Title: Minister of Arts and Culture
- Term: 8 years
- Children: 1
- Parents: Salomon Tandeng Muna (father); Elizabeth Fri Ndingsa (mother)

Ama Tutu Muna (born 17 July 1960) is a Cameroonian politician who was the Minister of Arts and Culture from 2007 to 2015.

== Early life and education ==
Muna was born in Limbe in Southwest Province on 17 July 1960. She is the youngest of eight children born to Salomon Tandeng Muna, formerly Prime Minister of West Cameroon and then Vice President of Cameroon, and Elizabeth Fri Ndingsa. Her brothers include Bernard Muna, Chairman of the Alliance of Progressive Forces, and Akere Muna, President of the International Anti-Corruption Conference Council.

Muna studied linguistics at the University of Montreal in Canada, graduating in 1983.

== Career ==
Muna was Secretary of State at the Ministry of Economy in Limbe from December 2004. She was appointed Minister of Arts and Culture in 2007. Muna initiated the Mbengwi Women Cooperative to combat the plight of the rural woman and founded the North West Women’s Forum.

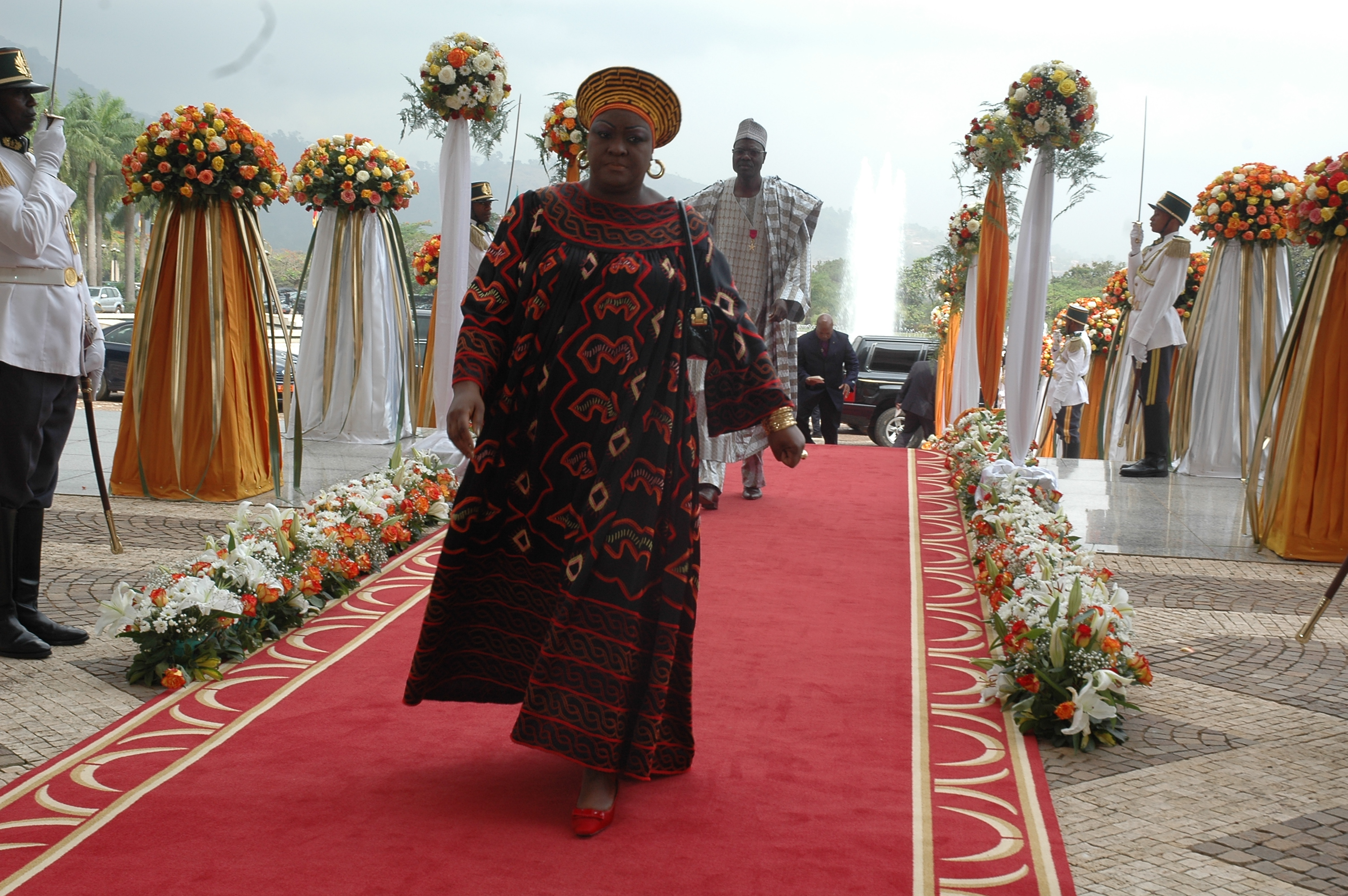
Ama Tutu Muna in 2012

In 2014, Muna was criticised for transferring cultural artifacts from the Northwest Region to Yaounde. On May 22, 2015, Prime Minister Philemon Yang gave Muna forty-eight hours to dissolve a new authors' rights structure (SOCACIM) she had created. She was removed from her ministerial position in a government reshuffle by President Paul Biya on 2 October 2015, amid reports that she had mismanaged billions of francs in authors royalties. In February 2016, staff sought to remove from her state-owned ministerial villa at Bastos, but she refused and claimed she had made arrangements to buy it. As of September 2016, she had not moved.

== Personal life ==
Muna had one son, Efemi Nkweti Muna, who was born in 1987. He was killed in a car accident on 8 February 2014.
