= Akere Muna =

Cameroonian lawyer and politician (born 1952)

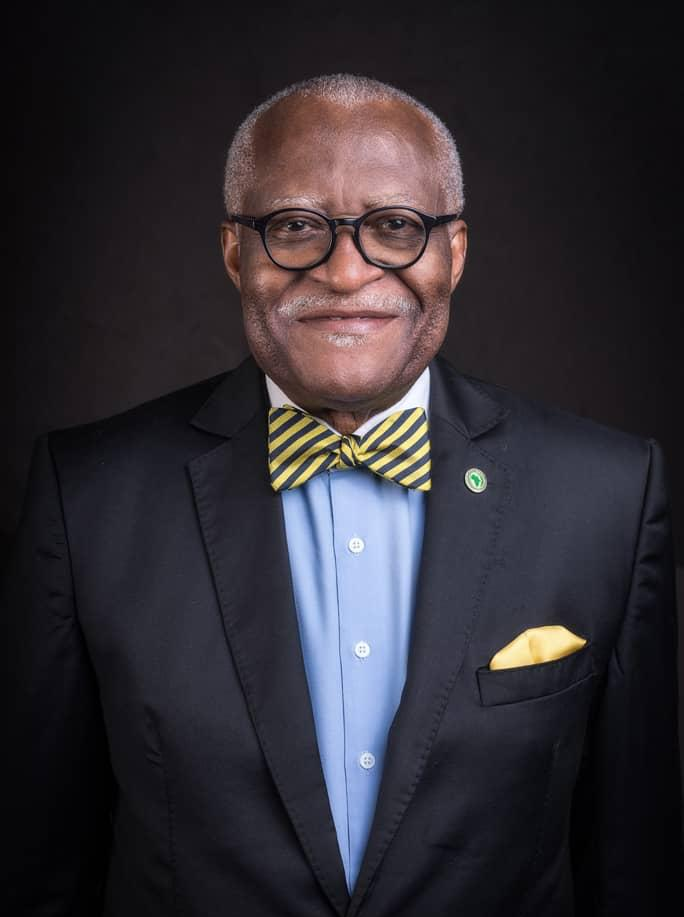
- 2022 portrait

President of the International Anti-Corruption Conference
- In office 16 October 2014 – October 2017
- Preceded by: Barry O'Keefe

Sanctions Commissioner of the African Development Bank
- Incumbent
- Assumed office 11 February 2013
- Preceded by: Position established

Vice Chair of Transparency International
- In office 14 November 2005 – 19 October 2014

Chairperson of the African Peer Review Mechanism
- In office 26 May 2013 – 29 January 2014

President of the Economic, Social and Cultural Council of the African Union
- In office 8 September 2008 – 10 November 2014
- Preceded by: Wangari Maathai

President of the Pan African Lawyers Union
- In office 5 July 2005 – 9 May 2014
- Preceded by: Position established

President of the Cameroon Bar Association
- In office 1997–2002
- Preceded by: Position established

Personal details
- Born: 18 August 1952 (age 74) Ngyen-Mbo, Cameroon
- Spouse: Beverly Bird
- Children: Lydia Muna and Kandi Muna
- Education: American University

Akere Tabeng Muna (born 18 August 1952) is a Cameroonian lawyer who is currently a member of the African Union High Level Panel on Illicit Financial Flows from Africa, chaired by H.E. Thabo Mbeki, and co-chair of the Common African Position on Asset Recovery (CAPAR). He is a former President of the Pan African Lawyers Union (2005-2014) and former President of the Cameroon Bar Association. He was formerly the chairman of the International Anti-Corruption Conference Council and sanctions commissioner of the African Development Bank Group. He has also served as the vice-chair of Transparency International and presided over the Economic, Social and Cultural Council (ECOSOCC) of the African Union, the Pan African Lawyers Union and the Cameroon Bar Association.

For most of his career, Barrister Muna denied having any political aspirations in Cameroon, and stated that his interest remains in his work as a lawyer and with civil society organizations. However, Jeune Afrique, a leading African weekly, described him as both a credible and the possible successor to President Paul Biya, given his prominence in Cameroon and his accomplishments on the international stage, especially in the areas of anti-corruption and good governance.

== Early life and education ==
Akere Muna was born in Ngyen-Mbo, a village in the North-West region of Cameroon. He completed his primary and secondary education in his native country before heading to the School of International Service (SIS) at American University in Washington, D.C., United States, obtaining a Bachelor of Science degree in international relations in 1975. He then moved to England, where he joined the Honourable Society of Lincoln's Inn. He was called to the Bar in England in 1978. That same year, he returned to Cameroon to practice law.

== Career ==
Upon returning to Cameroon, Akere Muna joined the legal practice of his brother, Bernard Muna. In 1984, the legal practice was converted into a law firm called Muna, Muna & Associates. Muna, Muna & Associates is one of the oldest law firms in Cameroon, with experience in the bi-jural (common law and civil law) legal system of Cameroon. Although Akere Muna has continued to work as a lawyer at the firm, he has held several positions in civil society within Cameroon and internationally.

=== The Cameroon Bar Association ===
In 1997, Akere Muna ran for president of the Cameroon Bar Association and won in a landslide. In that election, Akere formed a coalition (the Rainbow Coalition) for membership of the Bar Council that represented all the regions of Cameroon. All subsequent presidents of the Cameroon Bar Association have come from that initial Rainbow Coalition. This has led some to criticize that Akere Muna's efforts led to the creation of an elitist group with excessive influence in the bar election process.

=== Transparency International ===
In 2000, Akere Muna founded the Cameroon chapter of the anti-corruption watchdog, Transparency International. In the two previous years, Transparency International's Corruption Perceptions Index (CPI) had listed Cameroon as the most corrupt of the countries surveyed. Many therefore thought it was risky for Akere Muna to head an organization that challenged the status quo. The Cameroon government strongly challenged TI's assessment, and even considered suing TI. Muna, Muna & Associates lost many clients during this period, as many of those clients wanted to avoid the government's ire as a result of any association with the firm. Eventually, the government formed an ad hoc committee, presided over by the Prime Minister, to combat corruption. Akere Muna, was a member of that committee, in his capacity as president of the Cameroon Bar.

In 2004, Akere Muna was elected to the Board of Directors of TI. That same year, the African Chapters of TI designated him as Coordinator of the Coalition of African Chapters of TI. As Coordinator, he was involved in the TI working group that helped draft the AU Convention on Preventing and Combating Corruption, and authored a guide to the convention.

In 2005, he was elected Vice-Chair of the Board of Directors of TI, for a three-year term. He subsequently was reelected twice to that position, and stepped down in 2014, after serving the maximum number of terms.

=== International Anti-Corruption Conference Council ===
As Akere Muna's mandate as Vice Chair of Transparency International came to an end in 2014, the Board of Directors of TI appointed him Chair of the International Anti-Corruption Conference (IACC) Council. The IACC is a forum that brings together civil society, heads of state and the private sector to tackle challenges posed by corruption. The IACC takes place every two years in a different region of the world, and attracts up to 1500 participants from over 135 countries. Akere Muna was appointed for a six-year term.

=== Pan African Lawyers Union ===
Akere Muna was a founding member of the Pan African Lawyers Union (PALU), the umbrella association of African lawyers and lawyers' associations, tasked with working towards the development of the law and legal profession, the rule of law, human rights and socio-economic development of the African continent, as well as promoting African regional integration. In July 2005, Akere Muna was unanimously elected president of PALU by the heads of the various African bar associations. As president, he launched a program, funded by African Development Bank, to train African lawyers in sophisticated commercial transactions in all the five regions of Africa. He served as president from 2005 to 2014.

=== Economic, Social and Cultural Council of the African Union ===
In 2005, The Pan African Lawyers Union became a member of the Economic, Social and Cultural Council (ECOSOCC) of the African Union (AU), an advisory body created to promote civil society involvement within the AU institutions and decision-making processes. In September 2008, Akere Muna was unanimously elected president of ECOSOCC, replacing Nobel Prize winner Wangari Maathai of Kenya. He was installed by President Kikwete of Tanzania, the then-President of the African Union. He held this position until 2014.

=== African Peer Review Mechanism ===
In 2010, Akere Muna became a member of the APR Panel of Eminent Persons. The Panel exercises oversight of the African Peer Review Mechanism process, which is aimed at encouraging conformity among African countries in regard to their political, economic and corporate governance values. The Panel also oversees the selection of the APR Teams and appoints them to conduct country reviews. Akere Muna served as a member until 2013, when the Panel members elected him Chairperson. He was panel team leader for the assessment of Sierra Leone and Tanzania. He presented the reports for both countries, as well as the report for Ethiopia, to the APRM forum of heads of states. Akere Muna served as chairperson until 2014. His tenure ended controversially, with his release of scathing report on the APRM Secretariat and the internal governance of the APRM process. The report strongly criticized the Panel's failure to adhere to its own governance mechanisms, despite promulgating good governance among the signatory member states to the APRM.

=== High-Level Panel on Illicit Financial Flows from Africa ===
In 2012, Akere became a member of the High Level Panel on Illicit Financial Flows from Africa, a body established by the United Nations Economic Commission for Africa, and chaired by former President of South Africa, Thabo Mbeki. The Panel presented its report on illicit flows from Africa to the AU Summit of African Heads of States and governments in January 2015.

=== African Development Bank ===
On February 11, 2013, the Board of Directors of the African Development Bank (AfDB) approved the appointment of Akere Muna as Sanctions Commissioner of the African Development Bank. As Sanctions Commissioner, he may impose penalties against parties for proven commission of sanctionable practices in projects administered, financed or supported by the African Development Bank.

=== Campaign for President ===
After being appointed Chairperson of the Board of Directors of ECOBANK Cameroon in February 2017, Akere Muna resigned from his positions within ECOBANK Cameroon, the IACC, the IAAF and the African Development Bank to run for President in the 2018 elections in Cameroon, citing potential conflicts of interest as his reason. True to his reputation as “Mr. Clean”, Akere Muna was the only presidential candidate to release his declaration of assets prior to the election. After working unsuccessfully to convince the other candidates to form a coalition as the only way to defeat the incumbent, he formed a coalition with Professor Maurice Kamto of the CRM Party and withdrew his candidacy.

Akere Muna continues his work on the High-Level Panel on Illicit Financial Flows from Africa, as well as his work on anti-corruption and good governance across the globe. He advises several countries on matters of governance and anti-corruption, including the Democratic Republic of Congo.

In September 2024, Akéré Muna was invested by the Univers party and on behalf of a coalition of around twenty other political organizations, in the 2025 presidential election.

=== African Legal Support Facility (ALSF) ===
In March 2024, Akere Muna was appointed Goodwill Ambassador of the African Legal Support Facility (ALSF) association.

== Controversy ==
=== Abacha Affair ===
In 1999, Akere Muna was briefed by the Abacha family to be counsel for Mohammad Abacha, the son of the former president of Nigeria, General Sani Abacha. Mohammad Abacha was charged with the murder of Kudirat Abiola, the wife of M.K.O Abiola, a popular Nigerian businessman and politician. Akere Muna's representation did not relate to other allegations against Mohammad Abacha, involving charges of money laundering during Abacha's father's military rule. Due to the cloud of mistrust which loomed over the Abacha family in light of accusations of corruption, Akere Muna's representation appeared to conflict with his role as then-President of the Cameroon Chapter of Transparency International. Akere Muna ultimately withdrew from the case. In 2002, Abacha was acquitted and released by President Olusegun Obasanjo, after an agreement was reached between the government and the Abacha family that they would hand over the balance of funds embezzled during his father's rule.

=== Cameroon Government Representation ===
Critics of the Biya regime have questioned Akere Muna's representation of the Cameroon government and several parastatal institutions in litigation both within Cameroon and abroad. They point to a disconnect between his role in promoting good governance and combatting corruption across the globe, with his defense of a regime that has been riddled with accusations of corruption and undemocratic practices.

== Personal life ==
In 1978, Akere Muna, son of Salomon Tandeng Muna and brother of Bernard and Ama Tutu Munamarried Beverly Bird, the daughter of V.C. Bird, the then-prime minister of Antigua and Barbuda. They have two daughters, Lydia Muna and Kandi Muna.

== Family background ==
Akere Muna is the son of Solomon Tandeng Muna (1912 – 2002) and Elizabeth Fri Ndingsa (1918 – 1983). He is the seventh of eight children; six older brothers (Daniel Muna, Bernard Muna, Edwin Muna, Humphrey Muna, Walinjom Muna, and George Muna) and a younger sister (Ama T. Muna). His father, Solomon, was Prime Minister of West Cameroon, and subsequently the Vice President of the Federal Republic of Cameroon. He then became president of the National Assembly until his retirement in 1987. The Muna family is one of the most prominent families in Cameroon. Daniel Muna, Akere's oldest brother, founded one of the longest-running and largest private hospitals in the Central African region, Polyclinic Bonanjo (renamed the Daniel Muna Memorial Clinic after his death in 2009). He also served as the President of the Cameroon Medical Council, the body that controls and organizes the medical profession in Cameroon, and promotes and preserves the medical ethics code. Bernard Muna, a career lawyer, is currently Chairperson of the United Nations Commission of Inquiry on the Central African Republic. He was also the Deputy Prosecutor of the United Nations Criminal Tribunal for Rwanda (1997-2002) and served as President of the Cameroon Bar Association (1986 - 1992). In 1987, he was elected President of the Central African Lawyers Union (UNAAC). He ran unsuccessfully for president of the Republic of Cameroon in 2011, and remains a prominent opposition figure in the country. Walinjom Muna is a cardiologist and former president of the African Society of Cardiology. Ama T. Muna, the youngest sibling, used to be the Minister of Arts and Culture in Cameroon.
