= Narcisse Mouelle Kombi =

Cameroonian academic and writer (born 1962)

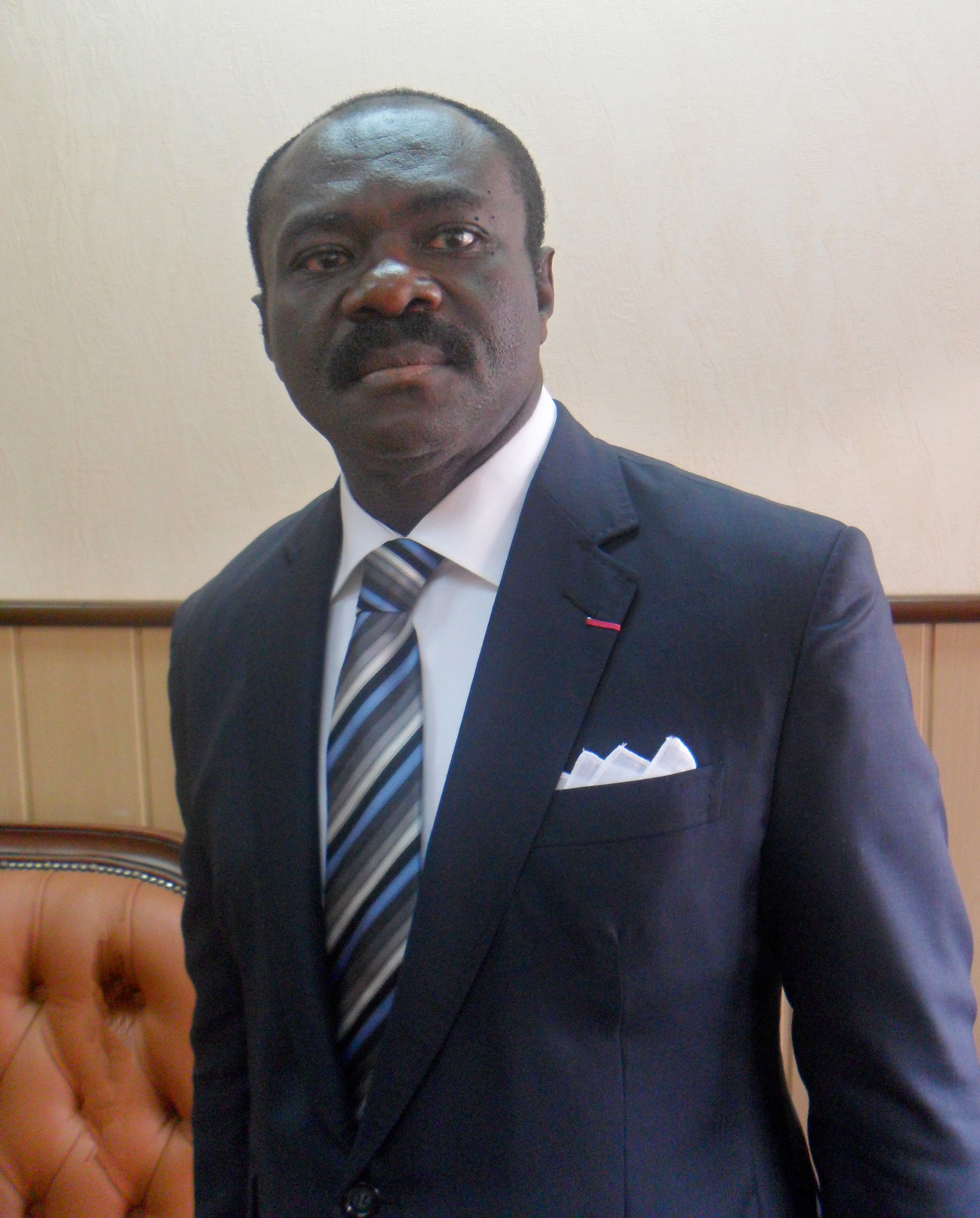
- Kombi in 2014

Minister of Sports and Physical Education
- Incumbent
- Assumed office 4 January 2019
- Prime Minister: Joseph Ngute
- Preceded by: Pierre Ishmael Bidoung Kpwatt

Minister of Arts and Culture
- In office 2 October 2015 – 4 January 2019
- Prime Minister: Philémon Yang
- Preceded by: Ama Tutu Muna
- Succeeded by: Pierre Ishmael Bidoung Kpwatt

Personal details
- Born: June 6, 1962 (age 64) Douala (Cameroon)
- Party: CPDM
- Education: University of Yaoundé; Université Strasbourg III; Université Paris II

Narcisse Mouelle Kombi (born on 6 May 1962) is a Cameroonian academic and writer. Associate of public law and political science, professor at the University of Yaounde II, he was appointed Minister of Arts and Culture of Cameroon in 2015 in the government of Philemon Yang.

== Biography ==
His father Mouelle Guillaume Kombi, a trained teacher in ENI Nkongsamba, director of public schools, is also a native of the village of Bona'Anja (district of Yabassi, Nkam). His mother, Marthe Charlotte Malongo Djengue, of the Bonanjombe-Dénè-Wouri-Bossoua lineage, a social worker by profession, died in 1998. Her father-in-law Walther Heinrich Kombi (1900–1984), a merchant, is one of the first generations of German-speaking Cameroonians.

Eldest of siblings of fifteen children, Narcisse Mouelle Kombi attended primary and secondary school in Nkongsamba, Mbanga and Douala, according to the assignments of her parents. It is at the polyvalent high school of Bonabéri in Douala that he obtained a baccalaureate C (mathematics and physics) in 1982. He enrolled the same year at the Faculty of Law and Economics of the University of Yaoundé, he obtained a bachelor's degree (1985) then, a master's degree in public law (1986).

== Studies ==
He then continued his studies in France, notably at the University of Strasbourg III where he obtained a Diploma of Advanced Studies (DAS) in international law and a certificate of English legal terminology in 1988; at the University of Paris II where he obtained a higher diploma in political science (1989) and at the University of Paris V where he supported in 1992 a doctoral thesis in law under the direction of Professor Edmond Jouve, with the honorable mention. In 1998, the same university awarded him the habilitation to direct research (HDR) in legal sciences. He prepares the aggregation at the Institute for the Development of Francophone Higher Education (IDESUF) of Bordeaux IV and is received in 2001, major in the competition of aggregation of public law and political science of the African and Malagasy Council for the higher education (CAMES). He was an auditor at the Institute of Higher National Defense Studies of Paris in 2007.

== Career ==
Having served as a supernumerary jurist at the Division of Legal Affairs of UNESCO in Paris and as a public law instructor at the Versailles Academy (1991–1992), he began in May 1993 a teaching career at the Faculty of Sciences. legal and political University of Yaounde II where he will be assistant, lecturer, lecturer and professor. He also teaches at the Institute of International Relations of Cameroon (IRIC) and at the Joint Higher Defense Center, Yaounde War School. He is since 2003, visiting professor of international law at the University Jean-Moulin-Lyon-III. Since 2005, he has headed the Department of Public International and Community Law of the University of Yaounde II.

== Administrative and political responsibilities ==
Narcisse Mouelle Kombi has assumed or assumed various responsibilities in university administration and various functions in his country.

Researcher at the General Secretariat of the Presidency of the Republic (1995–2003), Dean of the Faculty of Legal and Political Sciences of the University of Douala (2003–2005), Director of the Institute of International Relations of Cameroon (2005–2012), Member and President of the Sub-Commission on Civil and Political Rights of the National Commission for Human Rights and Freedoms (since 2006).

Since 2012, he has been Vice-President of the African Association of International Law and is a member of the Cameroonian delegation to the United Nations Cameroon-Nigeria Mixed Commission and the Green tree Accord Commission on the Implementation of the Agreement. implementation of the judgment of the International Court of Justice in the case of the border dispute between Cameroon and Nigeria.

He is Special Advisor to the Presidency of the Republic from 2011 to 2015.

He is named in the government of Philemon Yang Minister of Arts and Culture on October 2, 2015.

Narcisse Mouelle Kombi is an alternate member of the central committee of the CPDM, the party of Paul Biya (since the Yaoundé congress of 2011). He has accomplished various political missions under the banner of this party since 1997 in the district of Yabassi, the department of Nkam or the Littoral region; and at the national level, as Vice-President of the Communication Sub-Commission established during various events or elections. He is among others, the initiator and the spokesman of the Appeal of the Cameroonian Intelligentsia in favour of the candidacy of the president Paul Biya to the presidential election of 2004.

== Publications ==
He is the author of thirty scientific publications including four books:

- The imperatives of international law, Yaoundé, CRA, 1996;
- Cameroon's foreign policy, Paris, L'Harmattan, 1996 (ISBN 978-2738437013);
- Preventive war and international law, Paris, Dianoïa, 2006 (ISBN 978-2913126329);
- Democracy in Cameroonian Reality, Paris, Dianoïa, 2013. (ISBN 978-2913126930).

In the literary field, he is the author of:

- Translated from events, poems, Douala, AfricAvenir Editions, 1986;
- Such a tragic Dawn, Poems, Douala, AfricAvenir Editions, 1986;
- The Imperfect of Exile, Yaoundé, Editions Clé, 2010;

Having used his pen as a freelance journalist in the years 1980–1990, he published dozens of articles in pan-African magazines such as Bingo or Amina of the press group directed in Paris by Michel de Breteuil.

== Distinctions and other activities ==
- Knight of the Order of the Value of Cameroon;
- International Poetry Prize of the International Circle of Thought and Arts (CIPAF), 1980;
- First Poetry Prize of the National Association of Poets and Writers of Cameroon (APEC), 1986;
- Delegate of the Ideal ICG, Joint Initiative Group working for the development of Ecotourism and Sustainable Agriculture in the Wouri Valley;
- Member of several learned societies.
