= LITEXPO =

Convention centre in Vilnius, Lithuania

Coordinates: 54°40′43″N 25°13′30″E

Lithuanian Exhibition and Congress Center

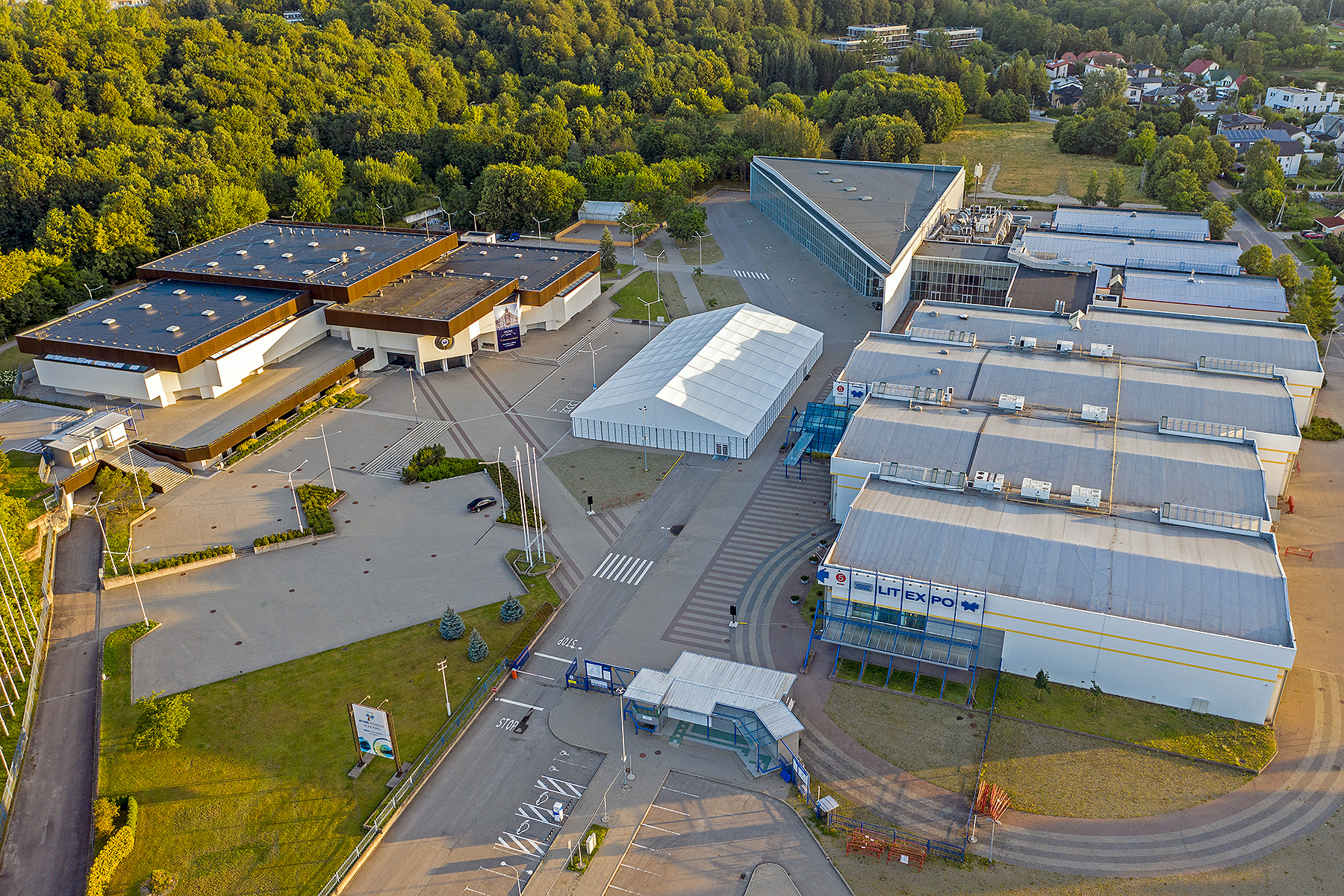
- Interactive map of Lithuanian Exhibition and Congress Center
- Address: Laisvės pr. 5, 04215 Vilnius, Lithuania

Construction
- Opened: 1960

Website
- litexpo.lt

LITEXPO (from Lithuanian exposition) or Lithuanian Exhibition and Congress Centre (Lithuanian: Lietuvos parodų ir kongresų centras) is the largest exhibition centre in the Baltic states located in Vilnius, Lithuania.

== History ==
LITEXPO organizes over twenty international exhibitions annually, including Resta (construction fair) and Vilnius Book Fair. Some exhibitions and associated events are organized with partners. For example, multiple events and conferences during Balttechnika, the largest technology and engineering exhibition in the Baltic States, are organized by Linpra.

It also organizes conferences and other special events. In December 2011, LITEXPO hosted Ministerial Council meeting of the Organization for Security and Co-operation in Europe. During the COVID-19 pandemic, LITEXPO was a major vaccination centre used for the mass vaccination. In July 2023, it hosted the NATO 2023 Vilnius summit.

== Technical details ==
It offers nine exhibition halls with a combined area of 17,600 square metres (189,000 sq ft) and outdoor area of 15,100 square metres (163,000 sq ft). The biggest hall has a capacity for 1,800 people, while the capacity of the whole centre is 8,000 people.

The Ministry of Economy owns more than 98% of the shares in LITEXPO.

== Gallery ==
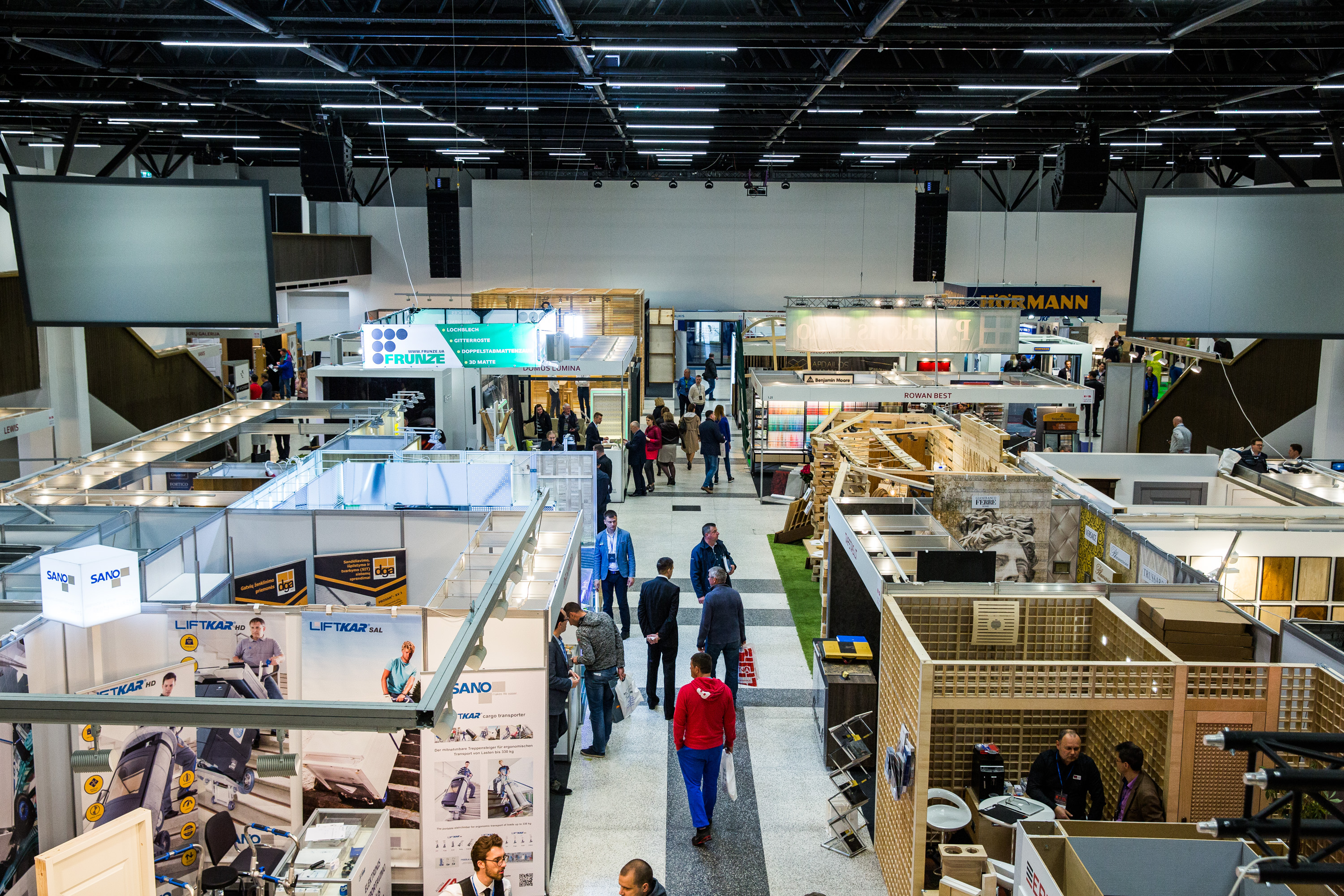
RESTA construction exhibition in 2018

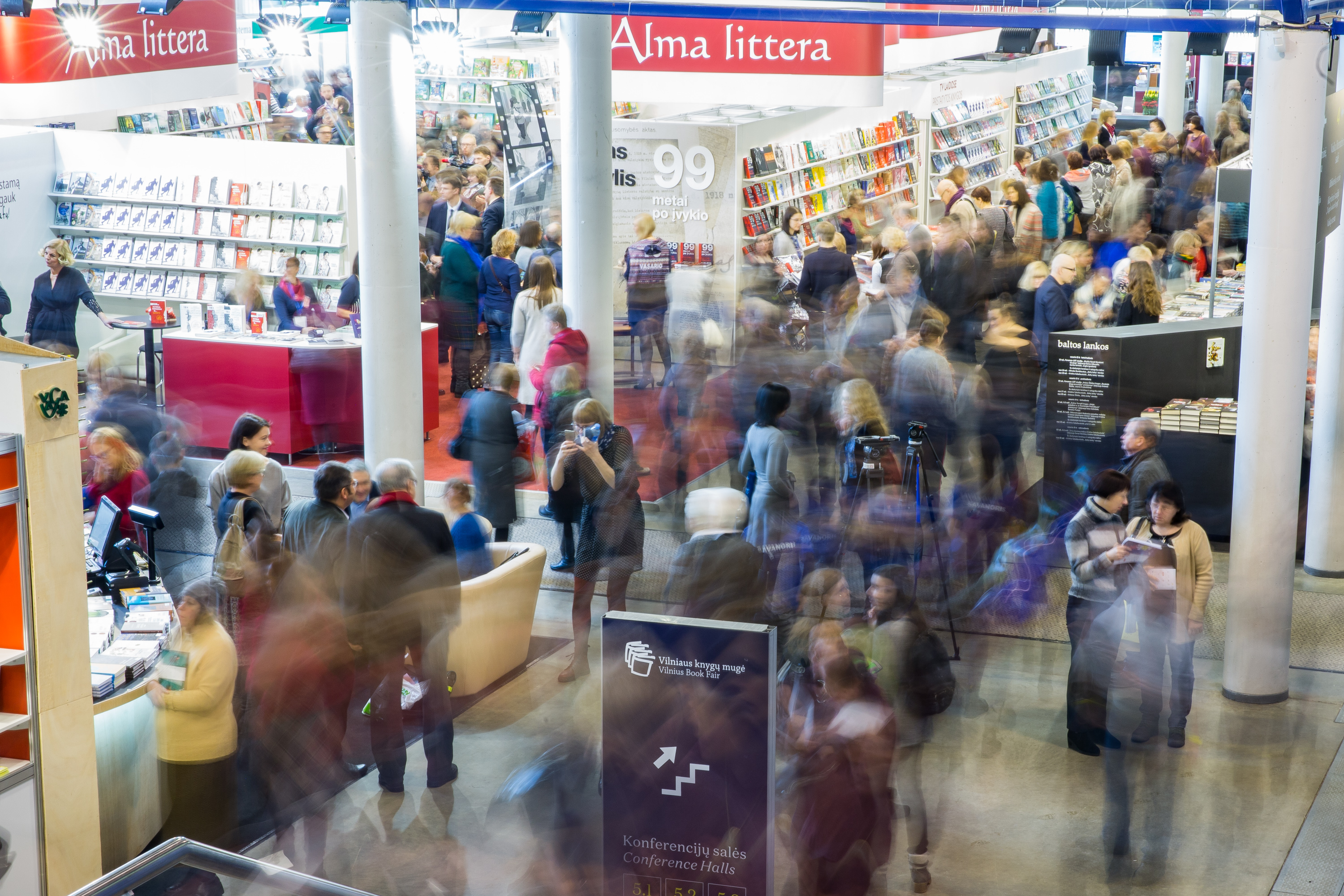
Vilnius Book Fair 2018 in LITEXPO

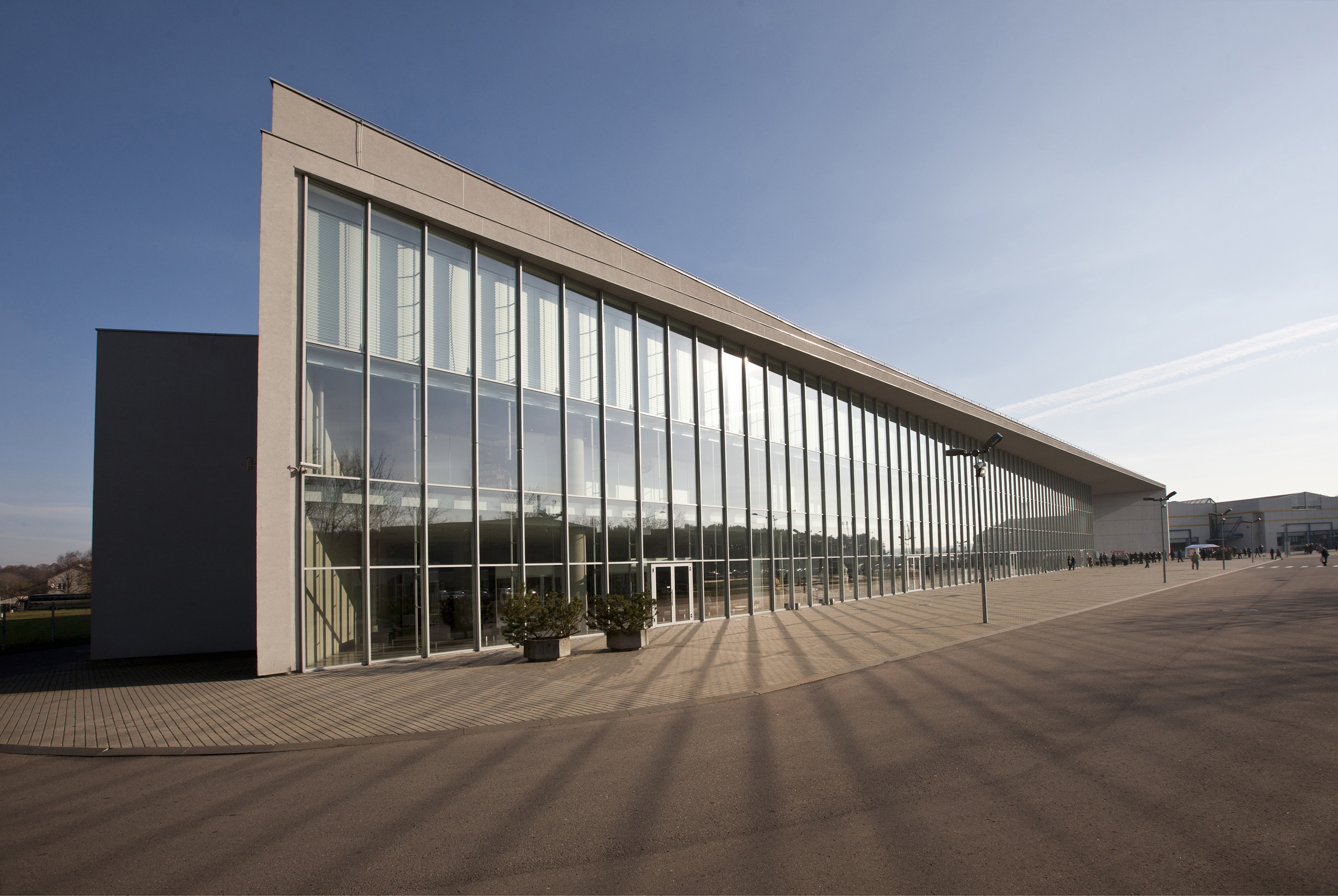
3rd conference hall

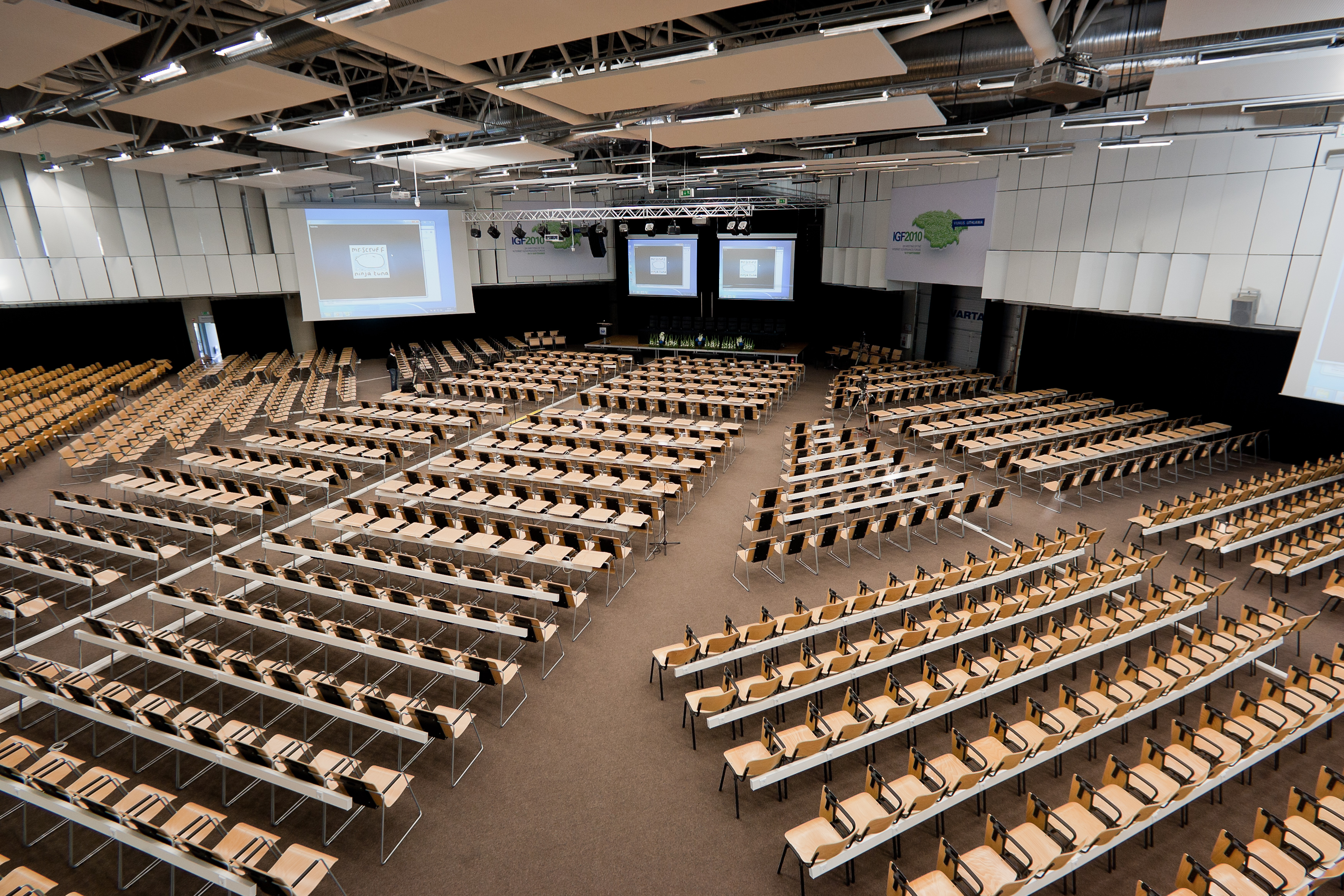
5th exhibition hall

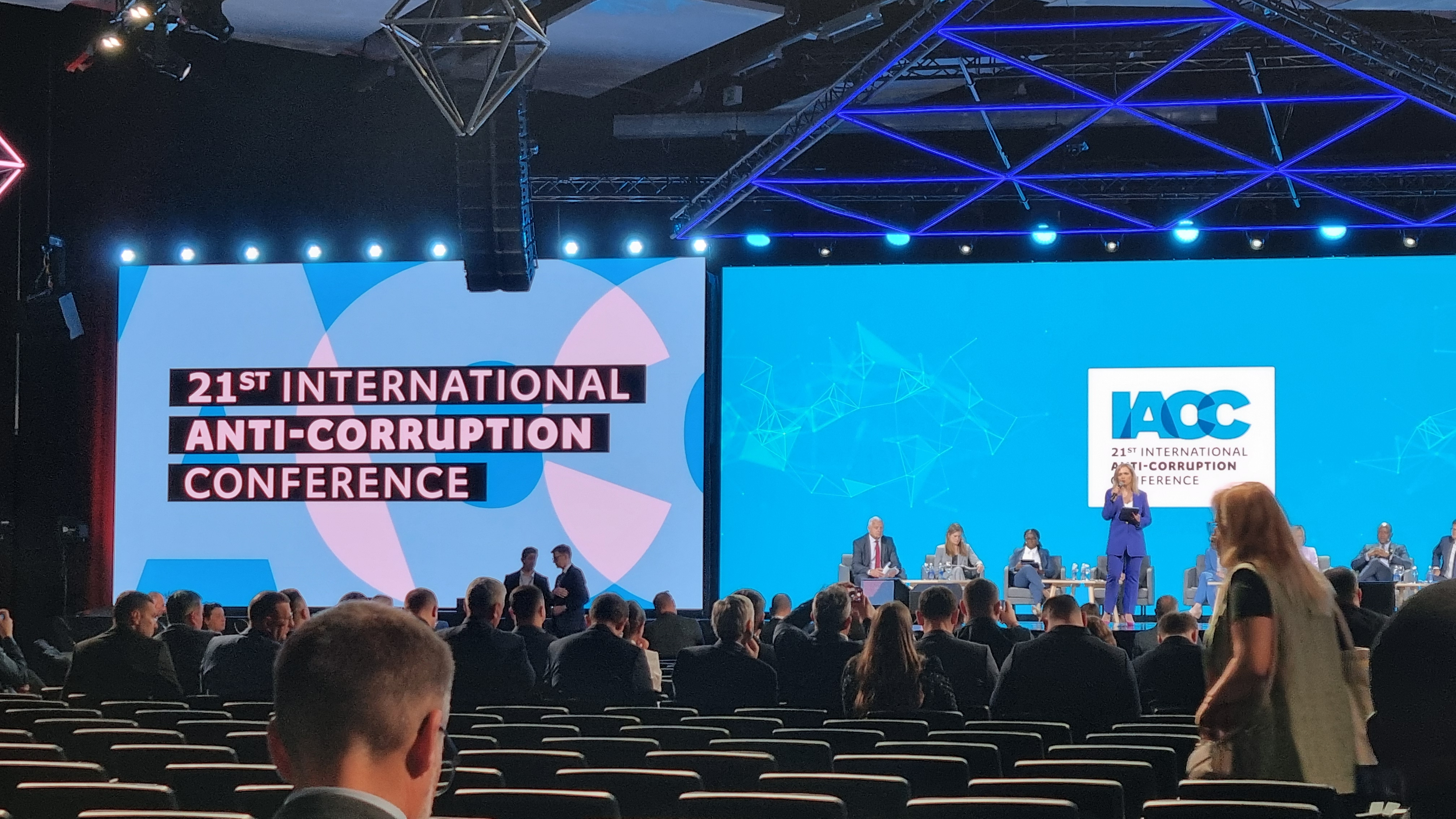
International Anti-Corruption Conference 2024 plenary session in LITEXPO conference hall
