= Vilnius Book Fair =

Annual book fair in Vilnius, Lithuania

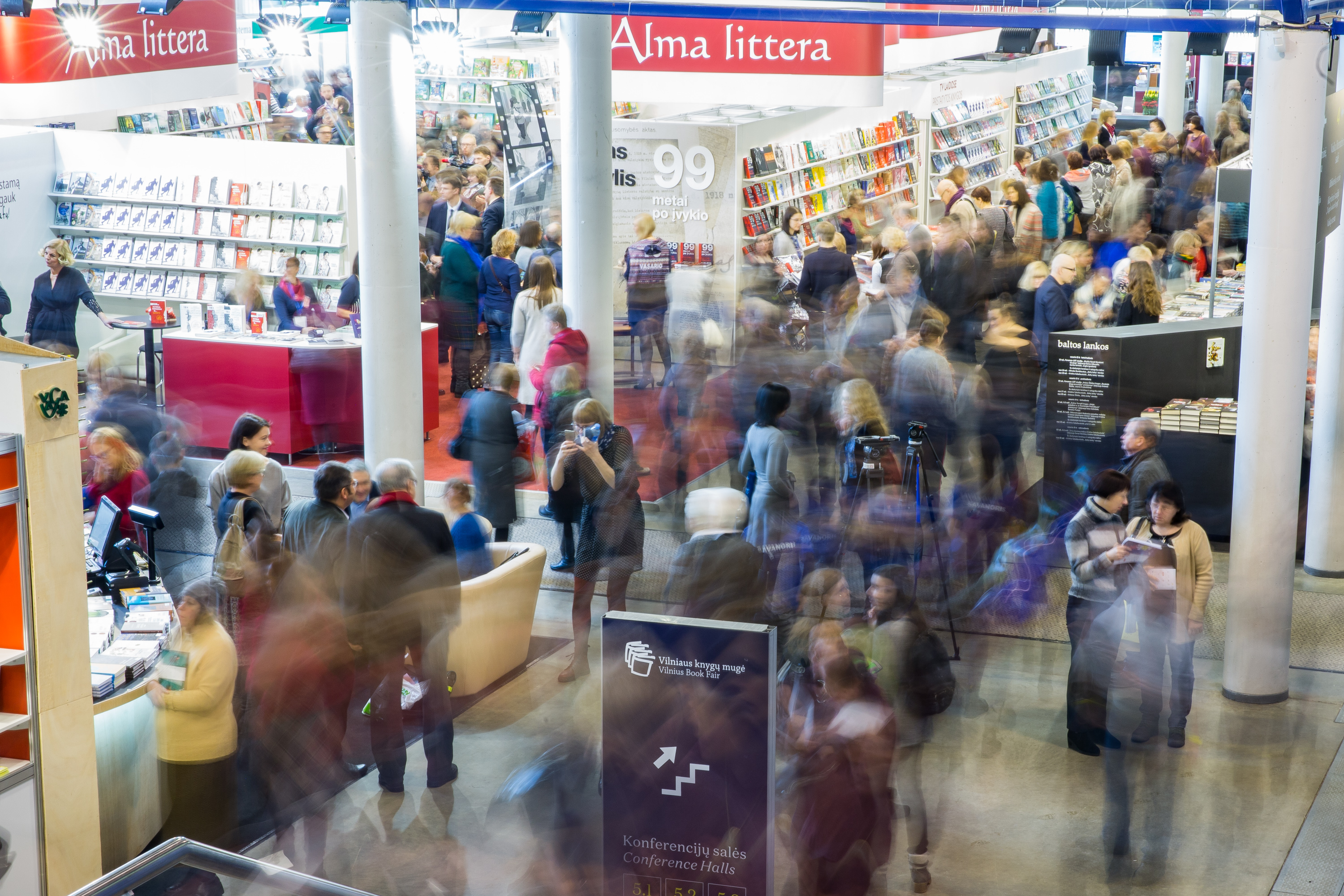
Vilnius Book Fair 2018.

Vilnius book fair is the largest annual book fair in the Baltic states, held in Vilnius, the capital of Lithuania. Traditionally it takes place in February at the LITEXPO exhibition center, and organized by LITEXPO, Lithuanian Culture Institute and Lithuanian Publishers Association. In 2009, the book fair celebrated its 10-year anniversary.

Together with the main hall, the book fair has:

- An area for young readers - offers books and creative activities for children. Contains a Library area for reading and meeting up, and a Creativity area that holds various activities hosted by writers.
- A forum - a place for intellectual discussions and new book presentations. Every year, famous artists, scientists and public personas meet there for the debate club.
- A music hall - gathers numerous well-known Lithuanian artists in the largest musical production fair in Lithuania. Organized by the association AGATA.
