= Corruption Watch (South Africa) =

South African non-profit organisation

- Formation: 2012; 14 years ago
- Headquarters: Johannesburg, South Africa
- Location: South Africa
- Coordinates: 26.147875°S 28.039547°E
- Parent organisation: Transparency International
- Website: www.corruptionwatch.org.za

Corruption Watch is a South African anti-corruption non-profit organisation that sets out to monitor and expose acts of corruption that involve public resources and donated charitable resources in South Africa. The various focus areas in which the organisation monitors and exposes corruption include corruption in the education sector, police corruption, leadership appointments (mainly in institutions that support democracy), corruption in the mining applications processes and its effects of communities, corruption in land ownership and tenure, beneficial ownership transparency, and public procurement. Whistleblowers are an essential source for the organisation as their whole operational mode is built upon reports received from whistleblowers.

Corruption Watch is the official South African chapter of Transparency International. (It is unrelated to the UK company formerly known as Corruption Watch Ltd.) (Note: Corruption Watch Ltd, founded by Andrew Feinstein, changed its name to Shadow World Investigations in December 2019 and was formally renamed in 2021.)

== History ==
Corruption Watch (SA) was launched in January 2012 at the initiative of trade union federation COSATU (the Congress of South African Trade Unions). The launch, held at Constitution Hill in Johannesburg, was attended by a range of government officials, including former minister of Justice and Correctional Services of South Africa Jeff Radebe, civil society and business leaders including Jay Naidoo, Mark Haywood, Mary Metcalfe, and Njongonkulu Ndungane, and a range of mainstream media organisations.

In his keynote speech, former COSATU secretary-general Zwelinzima Vavi lauded Corruption Watch as a "Critical intervention of COSATU and civil society that will help empower our people and successfully mobilise them." Radebe also spoke, decrying corruption as a "cancer" in South African society. David Lewis, founding executive director of Corruption Watch, said: "We have formed this organisation to enable citizens to report and confront public and private sector individuals abusing their power and position."

=== Land and Corruption in Africa ===
Land and Corruption in Africa is a decade-long Transparency International research project into the connection between land and corruption in Africa. Phase one, rolled out from 2014 to 2019, yielded rich country-by-country research on land corruption risks and the impact on citizens across 10 countries in Africa: Cameroon, Ghana, Kenya, Liberia, Madagascar, Sierra Leone, South Africa, Uganda, Zambia, and Zimbabwe. Corruption Watch is the South Africa lead for the project and works with various civil society and private and public sector representatives. A second phase of the project (2021-2025) is currently under way and has resulted in a research report and podcast.

=== Zondo Commission ===
In 2016, Corruption Watch added its voice to calls for the resignation of former President Zuma, stating that he was not doing enough to prevent corruption by public officials.

Corruption Watch monitored the Zondo Commission, a public inquiry established in January 2018 by former President Jacob Zuma to investigate allegations of state capture, corruption, and fraud in the public sector in South Africa. Corruption Watch produced various updates and reports.

=== South African Arms Deal ===
Corruption Watch monitored developments arising from the South African Arms Deal, including the work of the Seriti Commission, a challenge to the commission's report brought by Corruption Watch and Right2Know, and the subsequent successful review in 2019 and the setting aside of the report.

== Activities ==
Corruption Watch is funded by donations from a range of private philanthropic foundations and businesses. It has a small staff of fewer than 30 people and is located in Rosebank, Johannesburg.

As of 2026 the Corruption Watch board comprises Themba Maseko (chairperson), Marianne Camerer, Bridgitte Mdangayi, Zukiswa Kota, Karabo Rajuili, Thapelo Musekwa, Gary Pienaar, and Sanan Mirzoyev.

Corruption Watch monitors and exposes corruption in areas including corruption in the education sector, police corruption, leadership appointments (mainly in institutions that support democracy), corruption in the mining applications processes and its effects of communities, corruption in land ownership and tenure, beneficial ownership transparency, and public procurement. It operates a reporting system which encourages members of the public to share their experiences of corruption through SMS, fax, e-mail or online through its website, mobi-site, or Facebook page. It is modelled on similar schemes like I Paid A Bribe in India. The organisation uses this information from the public in various ways, including research, preparing contributions to legislative or policy development, undertaking strategic litigation on matters that are in the public interest, investigating a selected number of reports (of necessity this number is limited because of resource constraints), developing campaigns, and more.

Corruption Watch collaborates with various South African institutions that are charged with supporting democracy or dealing with corruption, such as the National Prosecuting Authority, the Public Protector, and the Special Investigating Unit.

Current and former representatives of Corruption Watch sit on various national anti-corruption advisory panels, such as the Border Management and Immigration Anti-Corruption Forum Infrastructure Built Anti-Corruption Forum, the Health Sector Anti-Corruption Forum, and the National Anti-Corruption Advisory Council.

Whistle-blowers are the primary source of information for Corruption Watch but sometimes the organisation conducts its own investigations and reports are created based on those findings. The key reports that Corruption Watch produces are annual reports, the Analysis of Corruption Trends (ACT) report series, sectoral reports - one each year - each focusing on a different sector, the Transparency in Corporate Reporting (TRAC) report series, and various research reports. Corruption Watch also produces public education material, usually related to their campaigns or with current focus areas.

=== Communication ===
Corruption Watch provides a platform for reporting corruption. Anyone can safely share what they experience and observe and can speak out against corruption. The available communication channels include Corruption Watch's website, a WhatsApp number, social media, e-mail or post. Walk-ins are permitted; however, they are limited to certain days, namely Mondays and Tuesdays as the team mostly works remotely due to COVID-19.

=== Investigation ===
The organisation investigates selected reports of alleged acts of corruption, in particular those cases that have the most serious impact on society. For instance, these may be cases involving basic health or education services which affect the most disadvantaged South Africans. Corruption Watch hands its findings over to the relevant authorities to take further action, and monitors the progress of each case. The organisation also collaborates with mainstream and community media to make sure that corruption is fully exposed through its investigative work.

=== Research ===
Corruption Watch gathers and analyses information to identify patterns and hot spots of corruption. The organisation prepares research reports on these hot spots to expose and find solutions to systemic corruption. Using its own communication platforms and the media, Corruption Watch shares its findings with the public, like-minded non-governmental organisations, and public sector bodies, all of which are stakeholders in the fight against corruption.

=== Mobilisation ===
Corruption Watch builds campaigns that mobilise people to take a stand against corruption. Campaigns involve the public, community groups, and other organisations such as civil society entities.

=== Other activities ===
Corruption Watch contributes to policy and legislation. It was involved in the 2018 People's Tribunal on Economic Crime. It has produced E-books for youth readers.

It has also undertaken strategic litigation that is in the public interest. Recent focus areas have included Parliament of South Africa in the case of Commission for Gender Equality appointments, South African Social Security Agency social grants, Sanral in Cape Town, the Richard Mdluli matter, and the Eskom delinquency case.

The organisation also promotes public involvement in the political process, especially voting in elections, contributing to legislation development, and monitoring appointments to key crime- and corruption-fighting institutions, including Chapter 9 institutions and law enforcement institutions. and lobbies for the development of regulatory processes for transparency in government spending.

== Technology projects ==
Corruption Watch has developed three data tools which focus on corruption.

=== Veza tool ===
The Veza tool is an interactive website that equips people with the knowledge and insight to demand better and more accountable policing. Features include a map of corruption hotspots related to policing, information relating to public rights when encountering the police in various situations, and data on all police stations across the country, such as locations, resources, budget and personnel. It also enables users to rate and review police stations based on personal experiences, to compare resources of up to four stations, to commend honest and ethical police officers, and to report incidents of corruption and police misconduct that are immediately geo-located through the tool.

=== Procurement Watch ===
Developed with a view to enhancing transparency in public procurement, Procurement Watch is a data tool that tracks and aggregates certain kinds of national procurement data, otherwise only available in pdfs on the National Treasury’s website, and makes this data easier to search, interpret, and understand. In particular, the tool provides data on deviations (from pre-existing procurement procedures); expansions (of the initial terms of a public contract); and blacklisted suppliers (suppliers that have been barred from doing business with the government). Meant mainly for monitoring and analysis purposes, it is not publicly available, but access is granted via an online form. To date, three reports have been produced from its data.

=== Local Government Anti-Corruption digital tool ===
The Local Government Anti-Corruption tool is a citizen-focused platform designed to promote transparency, accountability, and active civic participation in local government. Developed under the Strengthening Against Corruption (SAAC) project - funded by the European Union and implemented by Corruption Watch, Social Change Assistance Trust, and Transparency International - the tool empowers residents to identify, understand, and anonymously report corruption-related issues affecting their communities. Currently the tool is only available on the Eastern Cape, but the aim is to roll it out to other provinces in time.

== See also ==
- ACCU Uganda
- Botswana Center for Public Integrity
