= Corruption in Botswana =

Corruption in Botswana is usually regarded as one of the lowest in Africa. However, corruption is not eradicated and can still be seen in many different governmental sectors and in differing forms. Despite attempts at combating corruption, corruption in Botswana has started to get worse. The most common forms of corruption are nepotism or patronage.

== Extent ==
Transparency International's 2025 Corruption Perceptions Index gave Botswana a score of 58 on a scale from 0 ("highly corrupt") to 100 ("very clean"). When ranked by score, Botswana ranked 41st among the 182 countries in the Index, where the country ranked first is perceived to have the most honest public sector. For comparison with regional scores, the best score among sub-Saharan African countries (Note: Angola, Benin, Botswana, Burkina Faso, Burundi, Cameroon, Cape Verde, Central African Republic, Chad, Comoros, Côte d'Ivoire, Democratic Republic of the Congo, Djibouti, Equatorial Guinea, Eritrea, Eswatini, Ethiopia, Gabon, Gambia, Ghana, Guinea, Guinea-Bissau, Kenya, Lesotho, Liberia, Madagascar, Malawi, Mali, Mauritania, Mauritius, Mozambique, Namibia, Niger, Nigeria, Republic of the Congo, Rwanda, Sao Tome and Principe, Senegal, Seychelles, Sierra Leone, Somalia, South Africa, South Sudan, Sudan, Tanzania, Togo, Uganda, Zambia, and Zimbabwe.) was 68, the average was 32 and the worst was 9. For comparison with worldwide scores, the best score was 89 (ranked 1), the average was 42, and the worst was 9 (ranked 181, in a two-way tie).

The Business Anti-Corruption Portal, ranked Botswana as moderate in regards to the amount of corruption seen in the country. The Business Anti-Corruption Portal continued on, stating that multiple government sectors, such as the Judicial services, Police, Legislation, Public services, Tax Administration and Public Procurement all see varying risks of corruption. In the 2019 Global Competitiveness Report Botswana ranks 113/141 in the public-sector performance and ranks 32/141 in Transparency. In the Global Competitiveness Report conducted in the years of 2011 and 2012, it was reported that corruption in Botswana is one of the most problematic factors when it comes to doing business in the country.

Corruption has seen a slight increase over the past years, as a survey carried out by Transparency International and Afrobarometer in 2015 stated that 1% of Botswana citizens had paid a bribe in the previous 12 months for a public service, which in 2019, increased to 7%.

The survey also stated that 39% of Botswana residents think that people in police departments are involved in corruption, a decrease from 54% in 2015. 39% of Botswana residents think that government officials are involved in corruption, an increase from 29% in 2015, and 28% of Botswana residents think that members of parliament are involved in corruption, an increase from 28% in 2015.

Furthermore, in 2019, 52% of Botswana residents stated that corruption increased in their nation, 20% said it decreased, 17% said it stayed the same, and 11% did not give an answer; while in the 2015 survey, 51% of residents said that there was an increase in corruption, 24% said that it decreased, 14% said it stayed the same and 11% did not give an answer.

=== Forms of corruption ===
Corruption in Botswana is primarily used by the small, state elite. It is these individuals that have used their power to create patronage networks and have the interests of both the public sector and private sector blur together. Combating this form of corruption is harder. It is more entrenched in the state government and private industries, and the small minority that is benefitting from this corruption can use their power to ensure that it continues on. Nepotism and patronage are the preferred methods of these state elites.

Botswana is also a victim to petty and bureaucratic corruption. However, this form of corruption is typically rarely seen and perceived to be low. In 2016, the Ministry of Education and Skills Development spent 600 million pula without approval from the Parliament, and put Botswana’s education sector in financial danger.

== Anti-corruption efforts ==
Corruption in Botswana is primarily investigated by the Directorate on Corruption and Economic Crimes (DCEC). It is because of the Directorate on Corruption and Economic Crimes that Botswana is able to stay relatively low on the corruption scale. This is because of the high prosecution rates that the Directorate on Corruption and Economic Crime is able to achieve. To aid in fighting corruption, Botswana is also a member of the Eastern and Southern Anti-Money Laundering Group.

Mokgweetsi Masisi, the president of Botswana from 2018 to 2024, has also had a hand in combating corruption in his country. At a regional conference dedicated to combating corruption on the African continent, Masisi gave a speech as the guest of honour, where he called on governments to implement corruption-fighting policies. These policies would require internal accounting and auditing mechanisms, strong anti-corruption institutions to provide oversight, and the rule of law and due process. Masisi also explained the various methods that his country has adopted in combating its own corruption, which include the creation of a specialized court only for criminal acts of corruption, and a number of different legal acts, such as the Whistle Blower Act and the Proceeds and Instruments of Crime Act.

When it comes to other legal frameworks and acts passed to combat corruption in the country, the most widely noted is the Corruption and Economic Crime Act of 1994. This act created the Directorate on Corruption and Economic Crimes (DCEC), which has led corruption-fighting efforts in Botswana, and granted the Directorate its powers. The Corruption and Economic Crime Act also has a number of other powers, such as outlawing the solicitation, receiving and accepting of a payment with aims to manipulate a public civil servant. Some more powers of the CECA include numerous whistleblower protections.

== See also ==
- Directorate of Intelligence and Security
- Directorate on Corruption and Economic Crime
