= International Anti-Corruption Conference =

International conferences held to combat corruption

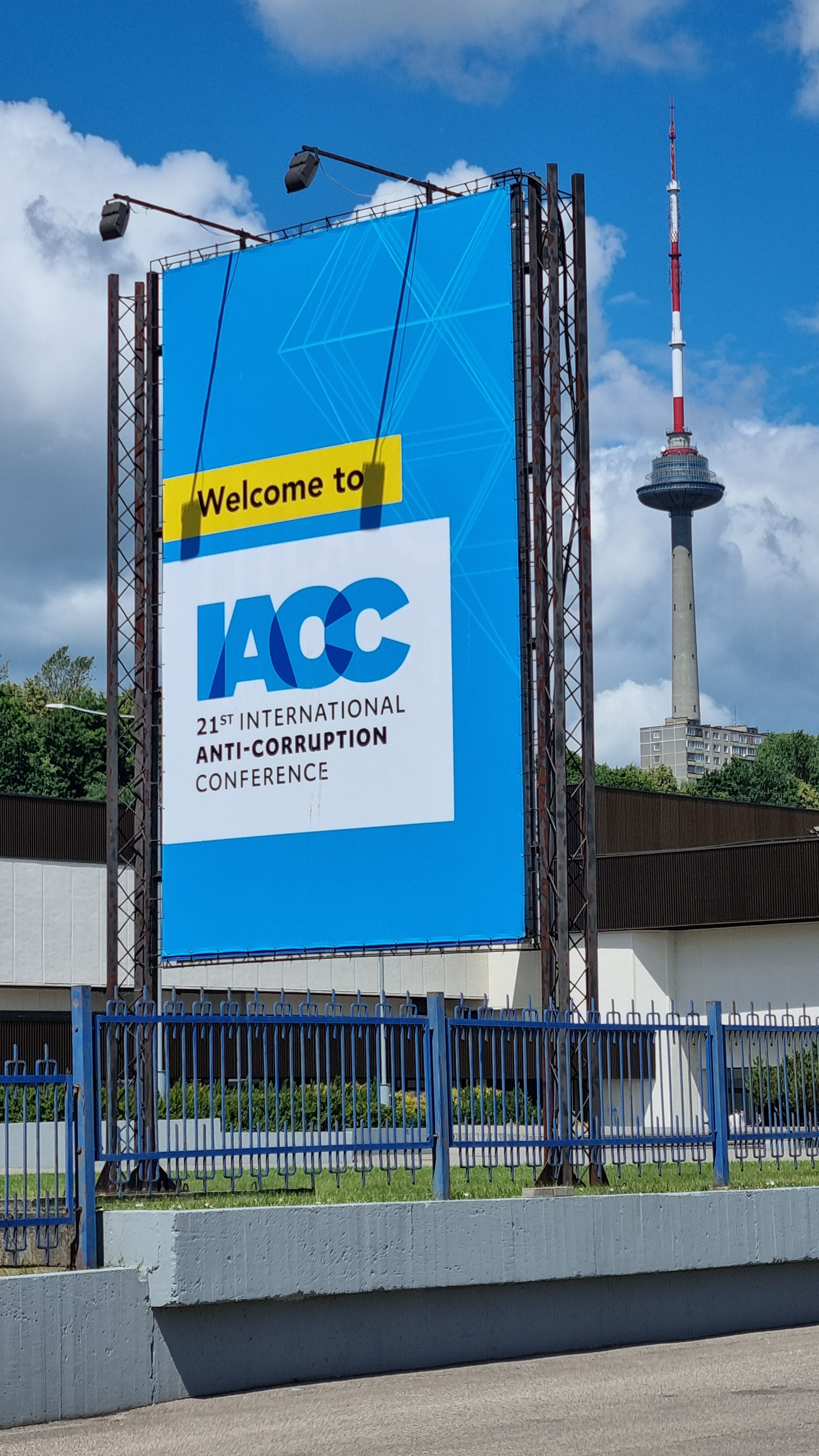
International Anti-Corruption Conference 2024 - sign at Vilnius LITEXPO convention centre

The International Anti-Corruption Conference (IACC) is a series of international conferences organised by the IACC Council, in association with local governments and organisations, with Transparency International as its secretariat. The conference was first held in 1983 in Washington D.C. and has since been held every two years in a different country.

IACC has developed a number of global initiatives that run independently of the conference, such as Young Journalist Initiative, Social Entrepreneurs for Transparency, Journalists 4 Transparency, anti-corruption film festival, and the Fair Play music Anti-corruption competition.

== Host cities ==
The table below shows the location of each IACC since the conference was first held in 1983.

Year	Location
1983	Washington, D.C.
1985	New York City
1987	Hong Kong
1989	Sydney
1992	Amsterdam
1993	Cancún
1995	Beijing
1997	Lima
1999	Durban
2001	Prague
2003	Seoul
2006	Guatemala City
2008	Athens
2010	Bangkok
2012	Brasília
2015	Putrajaya
2016	Panama City
2018	Copenhagen
2020	Seoul
2022	Washington, D.C.
2024	Vilnius

== Summary of conferences ==
=== 14th IACC ===
The 14th IACC was held In Bangkok between 10 and 13 November 2010 with the theme “Restoring trust: Global action for transparency”. The conference was hosted jointly by the IACC Council, the National Anti-Corruption Commission, The Royal Thai Ministry of Justice and Transparency Thailand. Delegates from over 130 countries were present at the conference, which was also attended by the Prime Minister of Thailand Abhisit Vejjajiva, World Bank Managing Director Sri Mulyani Indrawati, Asian Development Bank President Haruhiko Kuroda and Transparency International chair Huguette Labelle.

The conference featured 40 workshop sessions structured around four identified global challenges:

- Restoring Trust for Peace and Security
- Fuelling Transparency and Accountability in the Natural Resources and Energy Markets
- Climate Governance: Ensuring a Collective Commitment
- Strengthening Global Action for an Accountable Corporate World

The conference concluded as all attending nations pledged to increase the intensity of anti-corruption initiatives, and to fully honour all existing anti-corruption agreements.

=== 15th IACC ===
The 15th IACC was held in Brasília between 7 and 10 November 2012, with the theme "Mobilising people: connecting agents of change". The conference was organised by the IACC Council, with Transparency International as the secretariat and in association with the Brazilian Office of the Comptroller General (OCG), AMARRIBO Brazil and Instituto Ethos.

=== 16th IACC ===
The 16th IACC was held in Putraya between 2 and 4 September 2015, with the theme "Ending Impunity: People, Integrity, Action". The Conference was organised by the IACC Council, with Transparency International as the Secretariat in association with the Malaysian Anti-corruption Commission.

=== 17th IACC ===
The 17th IACC took place in Panama City between 1 and 4 December 2016, with the theme "Time for Justice, Equity, Security and Trust", The Conference was organised by the IACC Council, with Transparency International as the Secretariat in association with National authority for Transparency and access to Information ANTAI and TI National Chapter in Panama. The four-day conference was packed with opportunities for anti-corruption activists and experts to exchange, learn and enjoy through workshops and panels, film screenings, plenaries, an evening networking events and an outdoor concert, the Fair Play Anti-corruption Music.

The conference featured 60 workshop sessions structured around four identified global challenges:

- Panama Papers
- Strong, resilient and ethical institutions
- Shielding Justice, Financial Integrity
- People fighting Grand Corruption

=== 18th IACC ===
The 18th IACC was held in Copenhagen, Denmark from 22 to 24 October 2018.

=== 19th IACC ===
The 19th IACC was planned to be held in Seoul, Korea from 2 to 5 June 2020. In light of the pandemic of coronavirus disease 2019 (COVID-19), it was postponed to 1 to 4 December 2020. While the South Korean government was still the IACC host, the conference took place virtually.

=== 20th IACC ===
The 20th IACC was held in Washington, D.C. in the US from 6 to 10 December 2022 on the theme of "Uprooting Corruption: Defending Democratic Values."

=== 21st IACC ===
The 21st IACC was held between 18 and 21 June 2024 in the LITEXPO centre in Vilnius, Lithuania. Its theme was "Confronting Global Threats: Standing Up for Integrity".

==== Gallery ====
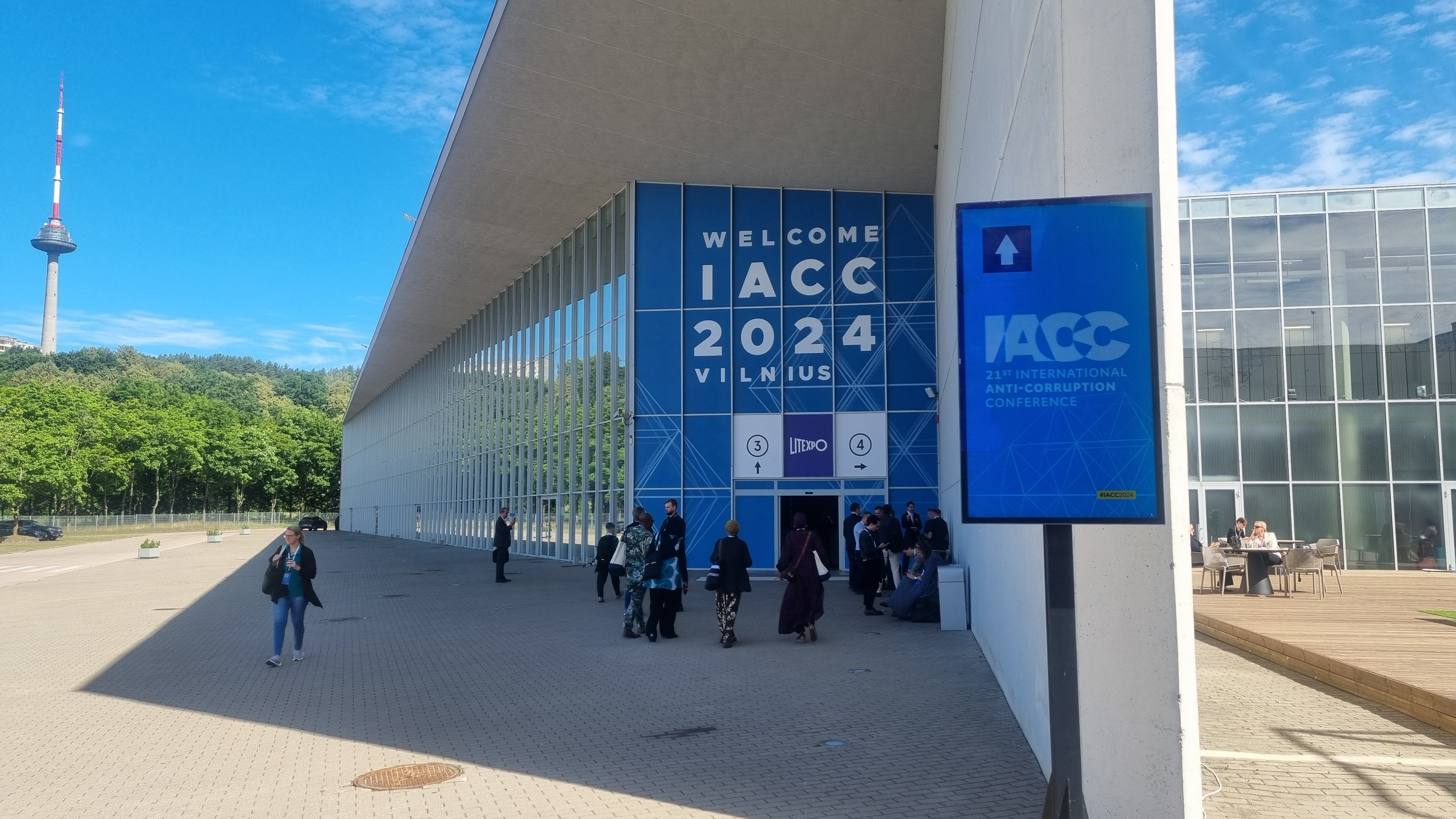
IACC 2024 delegates entering Vilnius LITEXPO convention centre

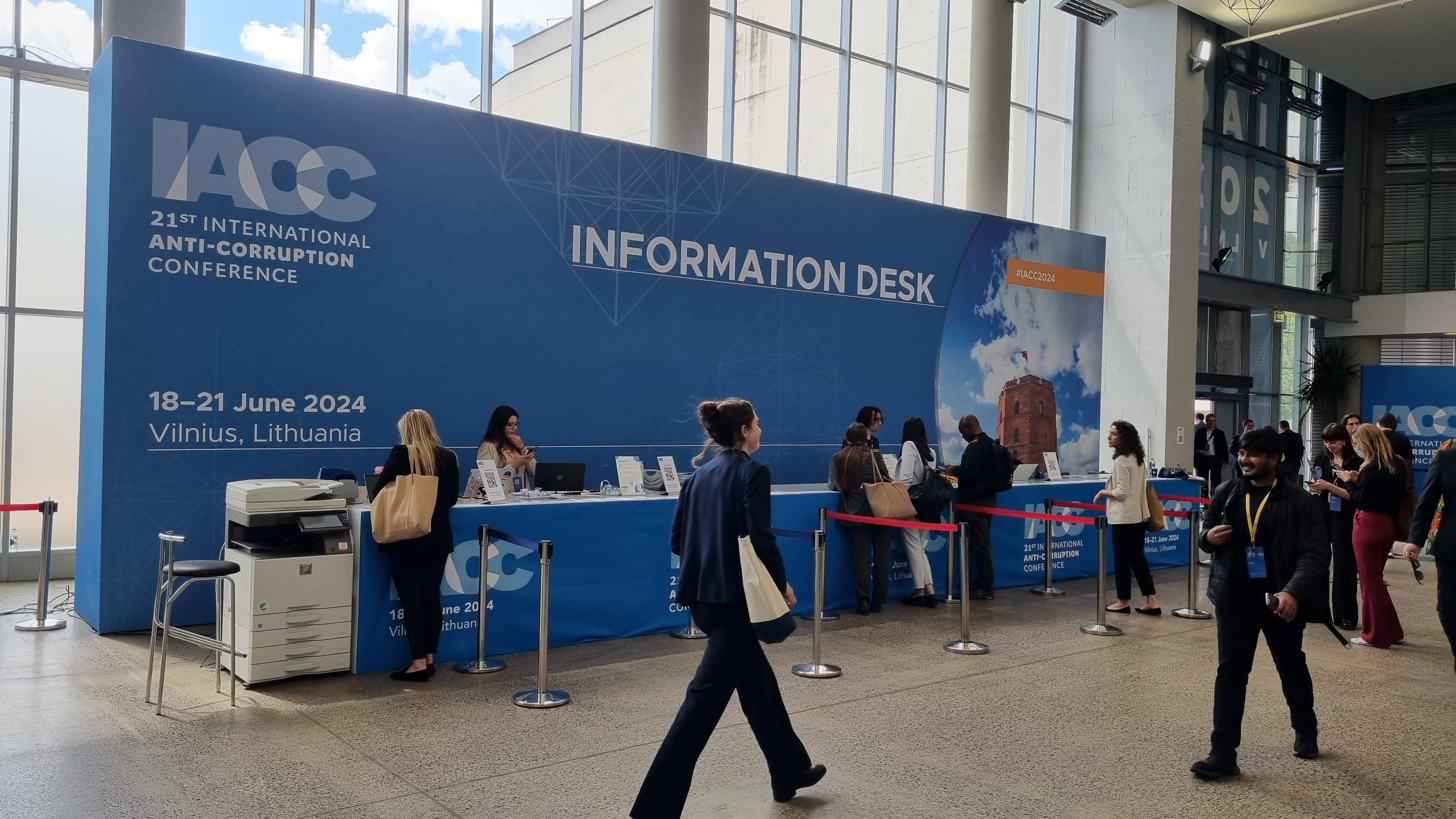
IACC 2024 conference registration

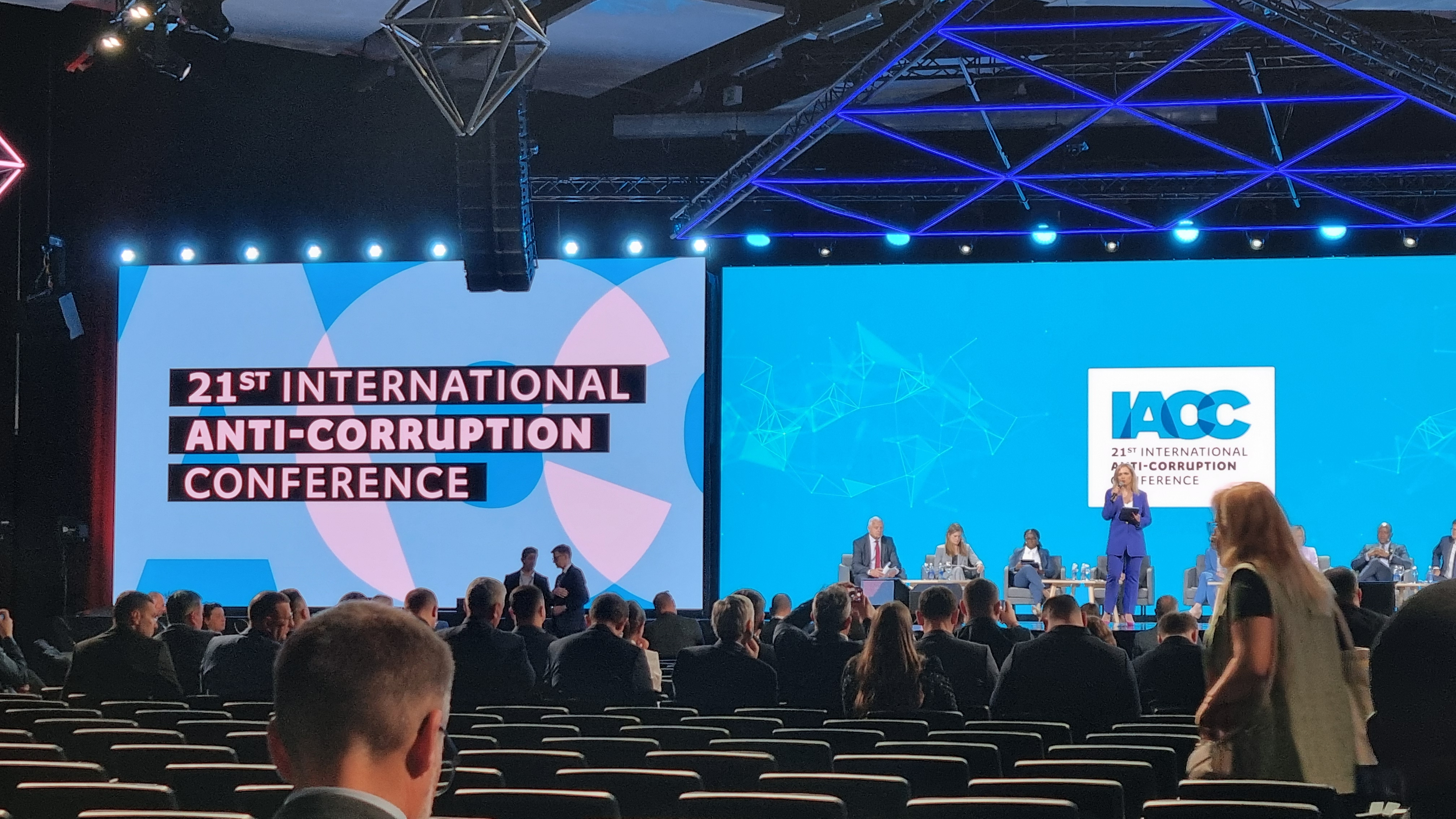
IACC 2024 plenary session

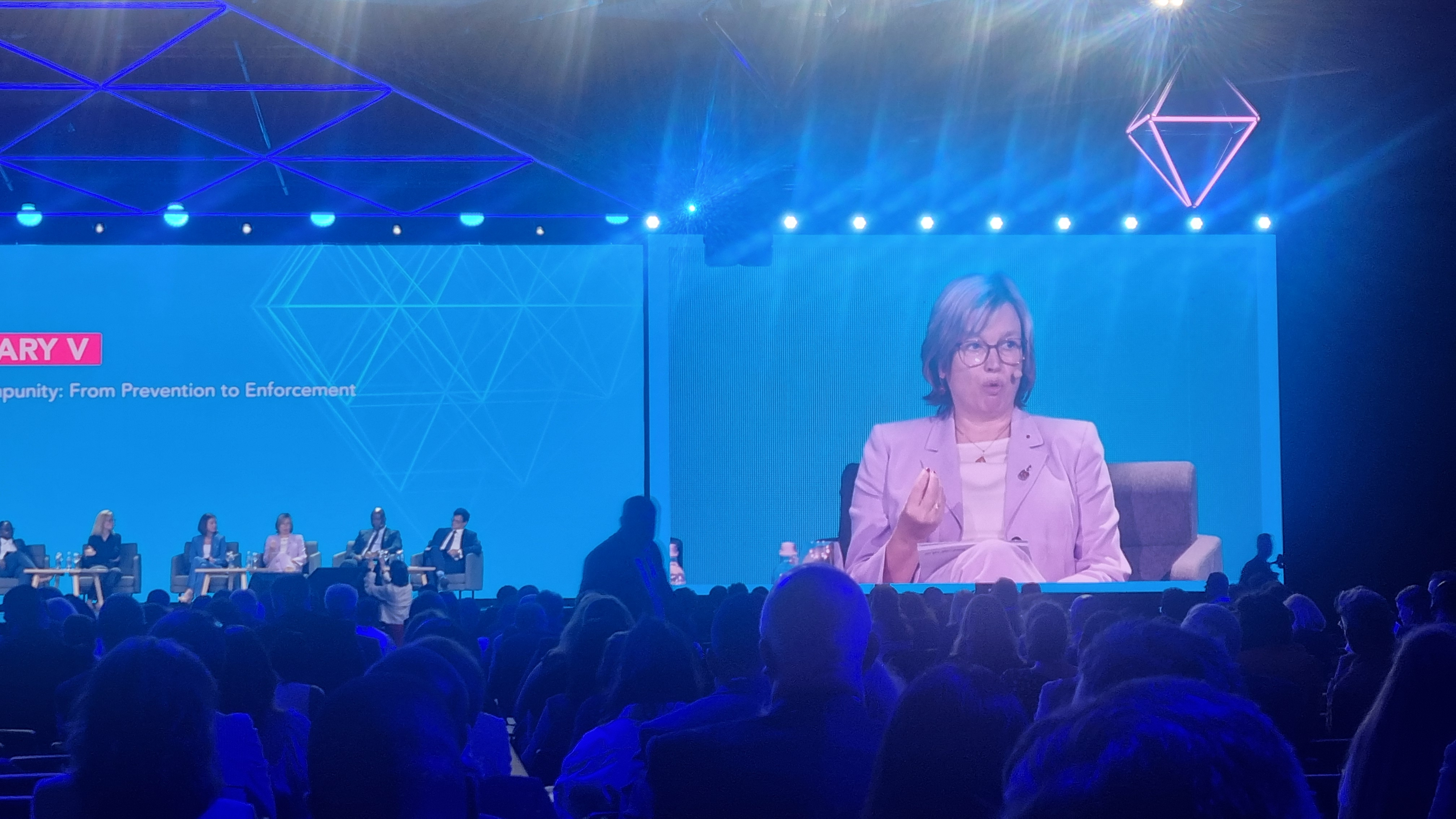
Catherine De Bolle on screen during IACC 2024 plenary session

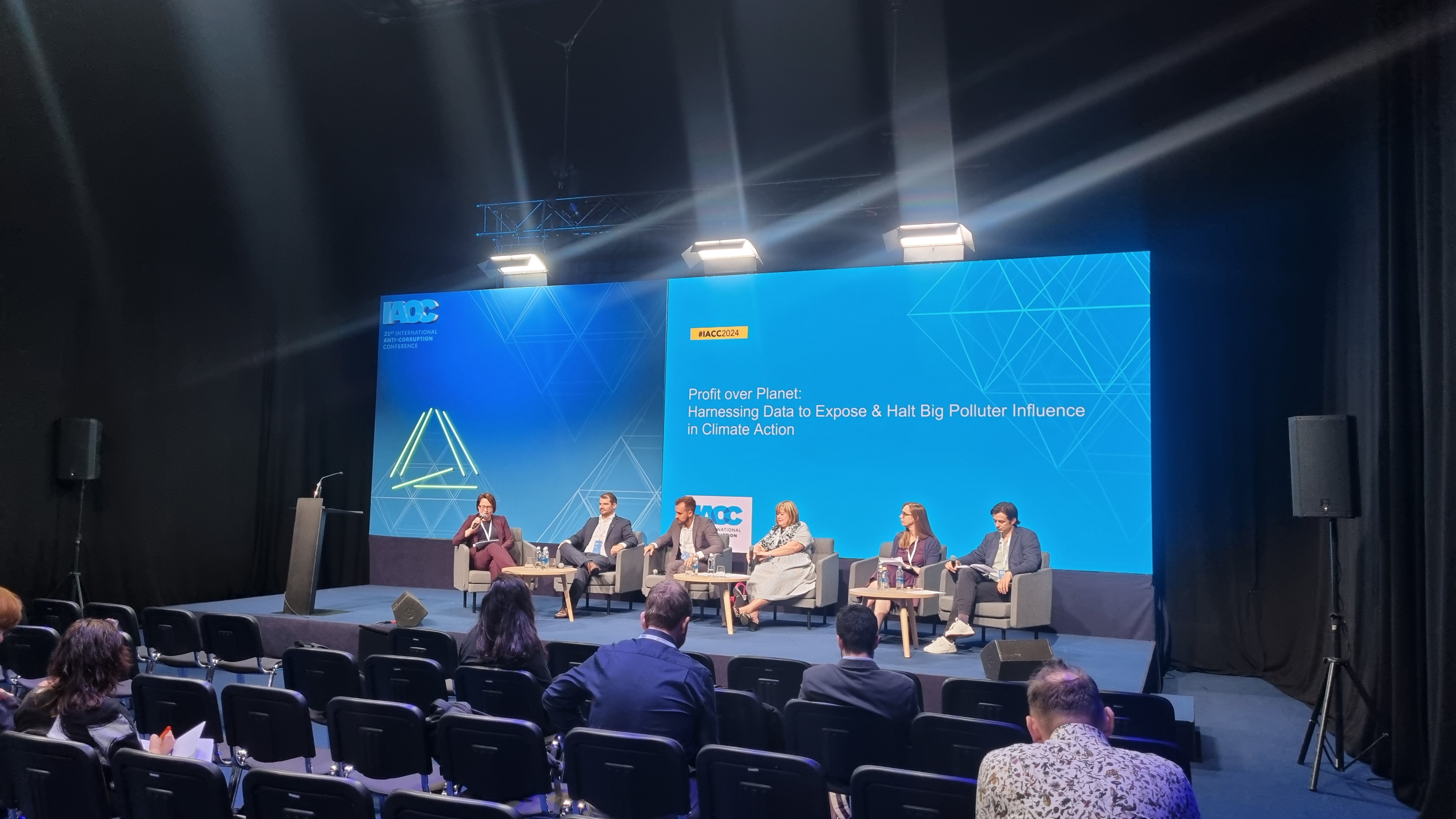
IACC 2024 breakout session

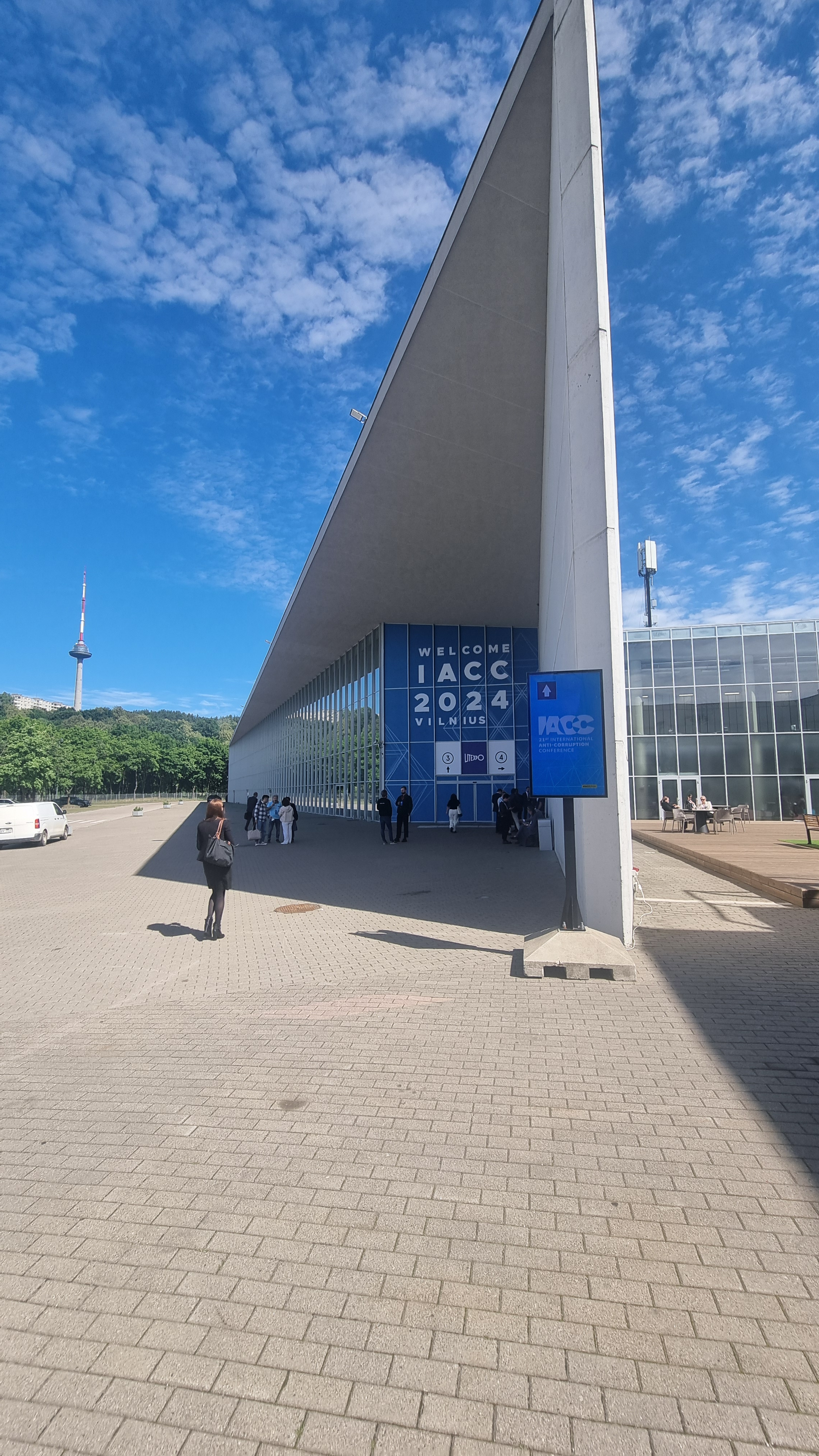
IACC 2024: exterior signage at convention centre

== See also ==
- Botswana Center for Public Integrity
- Corruption Watch (South Africa)
- ACCU Uganda
