= Directorate on Corruption and Economic Crime =

Botswanan anticorruption organisation

- Abbreviation: DCEC
- Formation: 1994; 32 years ago
- Purpose: anti-corruption
- Headquarters: Gaborone, Botswana
- Location: Botswana
- Key people: Botlhale Makgekgenene (Director General)
- Website: www.gov.bw/ministries/directorate-corruption-and-economic-crime

Directorate on Corruption and Economic Crime (DCEC) is a Botswanan anti-corruption agency founded in 1994 by the government of Botswana that sets out to monitor, expose & prevent acts of corruption

The current director general of the organisation is Botlhale Makgekgenene.

Whistle-blowers are an essential source for the organisation as their whole operational mode is built upon reports received from whistle-blowers.

== See also ==
- Corruption in Botswana
- Botswana Center for Public Integrity
