= ACCU Uganda =

Anti-Corruption organization in Uganda

Anti Corruption Coalition Uganda
- Abbreviation: ACCU
- Formation: 1999; 27 years ago
- Legal status: Non-profit organization
- Purpose: ACCU is a national umbrella membership organization of Civil Society Organizations (CSOs) and activists working together in the fight against corruption in Uganda
- Location: Kampala, Uganda (Headquarters)
- Region served: Uganda
- Members: Anti Corruption CSOs & Activists in Uganda
- Executive Director: Cissy Kagaba
- Website: www.accu.or.ug

The Anti-Corruption Coalition Uganda, abbreviated as ACCU, is a Ugandan civil society advocacy organization whose primary aim is to fight against corruption in Uganda. It has a network of nine (9) Regional Anti-Corruption Coalitions (RACCs) in the country.

ACCU was founded in 1999 by multiple organisations and individuals. The coalition then existed as a loose arrangement until 2004 when it was formally registered as an independent body.

Its initiatives are primarily aimed at empowering grassroots communities to effectively engage the local governments of Uganda to act against corruption and strengthen good governance. In collaboration with national partners and networks, ACCU also advocates against corruption at a national level. ACCU's efforts are implemented in conjunction with different stakeholders like the media, civil society organizations (CSOs), religious leaders and groups, individual activists, academicians and other key institutions. The nonprofit organization survives on donor support and membership subscriptions.

Over the years, ACCU has helped expose corrupt officials and practices in the private and public sectors of Uganda notably through publications like The Black Monday Newsletter, themed anti-corruption events like the Anti-Corruption Caravan and the Anti-Corruption Week (ACW) as well as regular corruption related news on its official website and online resource centre among others.

== History ==
ACCU was formed in August 1999 as the creation of many individuals and 10 organisations. These were: Uganda Debt Network, MS Uganda, Oxfam GB, Transparency International–Uganda, FIDA–Uganda, Uganda Women's Network (UWONET), DENIVA, UCAA, FABIO and UNATU.

The coalition existed as a loose arrangement until 2003 when the Annual General Meeting sitting at Human Rights Network Uganda (HURINET-U) took the decision to have it formally registered as an independent body. In 2004, ACCU was registered with both the NGO Board and the Registrar of Companies for Uganda to become a legal entity with perpetual succession and a common seal.

Since inauguration, ACCU has been surviving on donor support and membership subscriptions. ACCU started with support from MS Uganda as the main donor, eventually starting to receive funds from ActionAid Uganda and DANIDA as well. To date, ACCU has a consortium of donors ranging from The Democratic Governance Facility (DGF), ActionAid Uganda, UNDP, DanChurchAid, Partnership for Transparency Fund, CARE Uganda, Twaweza, among others.

== ACCU's work ==
ACCU's Vision is “A transparent and corruption free society”.

Its mission is “To empower citizens to actively and sustainably demand for transparency and accountability from the public and private sector”.

ACCU's Objectives are:

- To provide a platform through which CSOs pressure government to be responsible and committed to improving transparency and accountability in service delivery; and fighting corruption in the public sector.
- To equip civil society with skills, knowledge, conviction, confidence and methods of effectively fighting corruption.
- To increase information sharing and accessibility among the coalition members, strategic allies and the general public on exposure of corruption.

And its core functions are:

- Coordination of member activities for effective anti-corruption strategies.
- Research and advocacy on corruption related issues.
- Building the capacity of civil society to demand for responsive and accountable leadership.
- Facilitating information sharing and communication.

=== Projects ===
ACCU has of late been involved in the following projects:

The Forest Resources Sector Transparency Project - to deepen democratic accountability in the governance of Environment and Natural Resources (ENR) in Uganda under the Rights Equity and Protected Areas (REPA) Programme.

Gender Strategic Fund (GSF) Project– to empower women to fight corruption through use of mobile technology to monitor and expose corruption in the health and education sectors as a means of creating an engendered demand for social accountability.

UNDP Project – aimed at strengthening transparency and accountability in the utilization of Universal Primary Education (UPE) resources.

Citizen Action Platform (CAP) Project – to track problems with health care service delivery in the Apac district of Uganda.

Water Governance Project – to strengthen the citizens' capacity and voice to demand for transparency and accountability in water service delivery.

Karamoja Anti Corruption Community Empowerment project (KACEP) – to establish and operationalise a sustainable community based transparency and accountability monitoring and follow up mechanism in Districts of Napak and Nakapiripirit.

ACCU is also involved in the management of the Anti-Corruption Week (ACW) and partly contributes to the publication of the Black Monday Newsletter.

=== Anti-Corruption Week (ACW) ===
Every December, ACCU joins the world in commemorating the International Anti-Corruption Day on the 9th of the same month. That day always falls in ACCU's annual Anti-Corruption Week (ACW), with it usually marked with a series of activities aimed at mobilizing the public towards the fight against corruption. The week's activities are influenced by the global and national theme of the Anti-Corruption Day.

== Organizational values ==
ACCU's values are as follows:

- Integrity: ACCU carries out its activities in an honest and truthful manner, and takes all reasonable measures to prevent willful wrongdoing by its management and staff.
- Transparency: ACCU is open at all times in dealing with all partners in the fight against corruption; it documents its operations and freely disseminates them to the public as and when required.
- Accountability: ACCU takes full responsibility for its actions and is always answerable to the civil society and to its partners.
- Non-discrimination: ACCU endeavors to show fairness in all its interventions through the involvement of diversity of people and doing so in a gender-sensitive manner.
- Justice: ACCU is committed to promoting fairness in all its dealings.
- Solidarity: ACCU upholds that the struggle against corruption needs close collaboration with others and it will support others to raise issues of similar interest.
- Objectivity: ACCU works in full judgment of its actions based on well-consulted opinion of its members.

== See also ==
- Botswana Center for Public Integrity
- Black Monday Movement
- Transparency International
- Partnership for Transparency Fund
