= Partnership for Transparency Fund =

Partnership for Transparency, officially named Partnership for Transparency Fund is a not-for-profit anti-corruption organization that tackles small scale corruption around the world. Founded in 2000, the organization is headquartered in Washington, DC, with affiliates in the Philippines, India, South Africa and Germany.

The organization provides technical assistance and mobilizes resources to aid partner civil society organizations (CSOs) that engage citizens in actions to improve governance, increase transparency and reduce corruption in developing countries. The stated mission is to advance innovative citizen-led approaches to improve governance, increase transparency, promote the rule of law and reduce corruption in developing and emerging countries. In one part of India, an investment of under $300,000 over three years saw corruption reduced in the public distribution system, helping over 48,000 families.

An independent review by the Department for International Development found Partnership for Transparency (PTF) to be effective and encouraged donors to support them. Since its inception, PTF has supported 162 civil society organizations in 66 countries completing over 260 projects. PTF's model relies on the support of volunteer professionals who provide pro-bono assistance.
