= Bernard Muna =

Cameroonian lawyer, magistrate, and politician (1940–2019)

- Born: 27 May 1940; Kumbo, British Cameroon
- Died: 6 October 2019 (aged 79); Yaounde, Cameroon
- Occupations: Lawyer, magistrate, politician

Bernard Muna (27 May 1940 – 6 October 2019) was a Cameroonian lawyer, magistrate and politician. He served as Deputy Prosecutor of the International Criminal Tribunal for Rwanda from 1997 to 2002. He was a candidate for the 2011 Presidential elections in Cameroon.

He died of heart disease on 6 October 2019, at the General Hospital of Yaounde.

== Personal life and career ==
Born in 1940, Bernard Muna was admitted to the English Bar in 1966, becoming State Counsel in the Office of the Attorney-General, with responsibility for the prosecution of all criminal cases in the Federated State of West Cameroon. He was named Magistrate in Bamenda in 1969, and Chief Prosecutor for Northwest Province in 1971. He decided to resign from the Public Bar to enrol at the Bar of the Federated State of West Cameroon, establishing his practice in Buea.

Muna was elected President of the Cameroon Bar Association in May 1986, a position he retained until 1992. He was then named United Nations Country Rapporteur for penal reform and crime prevention in 1987, and elected President of the newly created Central African Lawyers Union (UNAAC).

Bernard Muna was appointed Deputy Prosecutor of the International Criminal Tribunal for Rwanda on 29 April 1997. He retained this position until December 2002.

Bernard Muna was the brother of Akere Muna, founder and former president of Transparency International Cameroon.

In 2013, Bernard Muna was appointed by the UN Secretary General to the UN Commission of Inquiry on the situation in the Central African Republic.

== 2011 presidential campaign ==
Bernard Muna announced his candidacy for President of the Republic of Cameroon, which was held in 2011. His candidacy was supported by the Alliance des Forces Progressistes (Alliance of Progressive Forces), an opposition party which had been previously prevented by government authorities to compete in presidential elections.
