= African Peer Review Mechanism =

African Union self-monitoring mechanism

The African Peer Review Mechanism (APRM) is a mutually agreed instrument voluntarily acceded to by the member states of the African Union (AU) as a self-monitoring mechanism. The APRM was launched on 9 March 2003 by the NEPAD Heads of State and Government Implementation Committee (HSGIC) in Abuja, Nigeria (NEPAD/HSGIC/03-2003/APRM/MOU (9 March 2003), Assembly Decision 198 (XI), Decision 527 (XXIII) and Decision Ext/Assembly/AU/Dec.1-4(XI); The APRM is an African-owned and African-led platform for self-assessment, peer-learning, and experience-sharing in democracy and good governance, in full respect for democratic principles, human rights, rule of law, the acceleration of political, social and economic integration in Africa;

== The Mandate ==
The mandate of the APRM is to encourage conformity with regards to political, economic and corporate governance values, codes and standards, among African countries and the objectives in socio-economic development as well as to ensure monitoring and evaluation of AU Agenda 2063 and SDGs 2030.

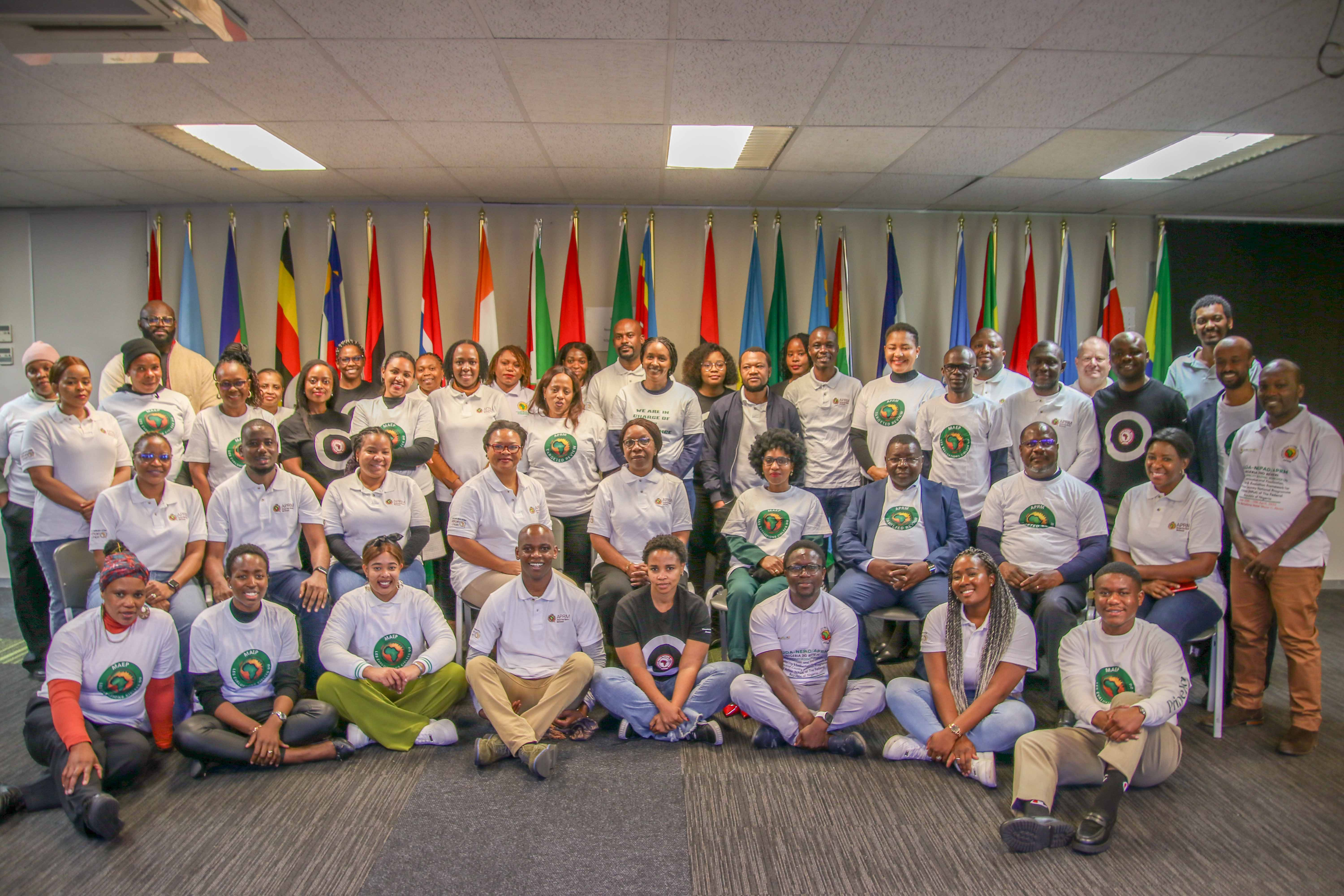
APRM Staff with CEO Amb. Marie Antoinette Rose-Quatre

The mandate of the APRM is to ensure that policies and practices of participating Member States conform to the agreed political, economic and corporate governance values, codes and standards contained in the African Union Declaration on Democracy, Political, Economic and Corporate Governance. As a voluntary self-monitoring instrument, APRM fosters the adoption of policies, standards and practices that lead to political stability, high economic growth, sustainable development and accelerated regional and continental economic integration through sharing of experiences and best practices, including identifying deficiencies and assessing the needs for capacity building.

== Expanded Mandate ==
In 2018, during the 28th Assembly of Heads of State and Government of the AU, the APR Forum of Heads of State and Government decided to extend the APRM's mandate. This expansion includes the tracking and oversight of key governance initiatives across the continent.

Furthermore, the AU Assembly expanded the APRM's responsibilities to encompass monitoring the implementation of the African Union's Agenda 2063

Organisation	African Peer Review Mechanism (APRM)
Established	9 March 2003
Parent	African Union
Total Member States	44
Chief Executive	Ambassador Marie Antoinette Rose Quarte
APR Forum Chairperson (2024-2026)	H.E Abdelmadjid Tebboune, President of the People's Democratic Republic of Algeria
Website	https://aprm.au.int/en
Address	Building F, Eco Origin Office Park, 349 Witch-Hazel Ave, Eco-Park Estate, Highveld, Centurion, 0144.
Connect	Facebook: https://www.facebook.com/AfricanPeerReviewMechanism/ X (Twitter) - https://twitter.com/APRMorg/ YouTube - https://www.youtube.com/aprmechanism LinkedIn - https://www.linkedin.com/company/african-peer-review-mechanism/ Instagram - https://www.instagram.com/aprmorg/

and the United Nations Sustainable Development Goals (SDGs) as part of Agenda 2030. This broadened mandate aims to enhance the APRM's role in promoting governance, development, and accountability in African nations.

- Tracking governance-related aspects of Agenda 2063 and UN SDGs 2030
- Biennial Africa Governance Report completed in AGR2019, AGR2021, AGR2023 on UCG. AGR2025 (tbc)
- National Governance Reporting
- Support to Member States in the area of International Credit Rating Agencies

== Africa's self-assessment for good governance ==
Member countries within the APRM undertake self-monitoring in all aspects of their governance and socio-economic development. African Union (AU) stakeholders participate in the self-assessment of all branches of government – executive, legislative and judicial – as well as the private sector, civil society and the media. The APRM Review Process gives member states a space for national dialogue on governance and socio-economic indicators and an opportunity to build consensus on the way forward.

== Four types of country reviews ==
1. Base Review – carried out immediately after a country becomes a member of the APRM

2. Periodic Review every four years

3. Targeted Review – requested by the member country itself outside the framework of mandated reviews

4. A Review commissioned by the APR Forum when there are early signs of pending political and economic crisis.

== Five Thematic Areas ==
1. Democracy and Political Governance (DPG)

2. Economic Governance and Management (EGM)

3. Corporate Governance (CG)

4. Broad-based Sustainable Socio-economic Development (SED)

5. State Resilience to Shocks and Disasters

The APRM Principles that underpin APRM reviews include

(i) national ownership and leadership;

(ii) inclusive participation;

(iii) technical competence and

(iv) freedom from political manipulation.

== The five stages of a peer review ==
=== 1. Consultation ===
The APR Secretariat and the Country under review consult on the process overview and terms of the Memorandum of Understanding (MoU). The Country under review creates a Focal Point to liaise with the Secretariat and provide it with relevant laws, treaty ratifications, budgets and development plans. The Secretariat prepares a background assessment document. At the same time, the Country under review independently completes the APR Self-Assessment Questionnaire, gathers inputs from civil society and drafts a paper outlining the nation's issues and a National Programme of Action (NPoA) with clear steps and deadlines on how it plans to conform to APRM codes and standards, the African Union Charter, and UN obligations. The Country Review Team that is set up writes a report outlining issues to be focused on during the review mission.

2. THE REVIEW MISSION

Visits the Country under review and conducts broad-based consultations with government, officials, political parties, parliamentarians, and representatives of civil society organisations (e.g. media, academia, trade unions, professional bodies), and the private sector. The mission typically lasts two-and-a-half to three weeks.

3. DRAFT REPORT

The APR Country Review Team drafts a report on the Country under review.

4.THE PEER REVIEW

takes place at the level of the APR Forum, using the APR Panel's report on the team's findings as a basis. The APR Forum discusses these recommendations with the Reviewed Country's leadership.

5. FINAL REPORT

Within six months, after the peer review, the published Country Review Report must be tabled in sub-regional institutions (Pan-African Parliament, African Commission on Human and Peoples' Rights, AU Peace and Security Council, Economic, Social and Cultural Council of the African Union [AU-ECOSOCC]). The report is then made publicly available.

== The second generation review ==
The objective of the APRM Second Generation Review is to assess progress made in Governance and Socio-economic Development in Member States in the period since the Base Review. The specific objectives are to:

- reinvigorate, rationalize and institutionalize the APRM in governance reforms within a Member States.
- appraise to what extent the National Programme of Action (NPoA) is implemented and its continued relevance, on the basis of which a new NPOA with a few key actions will be proposed;
- facilitate the development of a second NPOA with greater focus and based only on key actions; and
- make the APRM Review process more relevant to citizens' needs, more cost-effective and in tune with the Agenda 2063 priorities and goals.

== What happens after the country review ==
The National Programme of Action (NPoA) is divided into short-term, medium-term and long-term goals and is continuously monitored by the National Governance Commission/Governing Council, or a smaller body of state and non-state representatives. Progress Reports on implementation are presented annually to the APR Forum. The APR Secretariat follows up on commitments made, holds regional workshops to share best practices identified in the reviews, and offers technical support to fulfill APRM plans.

== APRM Structures ==
=== APR FORUM ===
(Committee of Participating Heads of State and Government)

Highest decision-making authority.

APR PANEL

(Panel of Eminent Persons)

Oversees the review process to ensure its independence, professionalism and credibility, and reports to the Forum. The APR Panel is also responsible for selecting and appointing and the Review Teams.

COMMITTEE OF FOCAL POINTS

Committee of representatives of Heads of State and Government

Manages the budgetary process, resource mobilisation through Member States, Strategic and Development Partners, and the APRM Trust Fund and Audit.

National Governing Council (NGC)

The National Governance Commission/National Governing Council (NGC) is the body that oversees implementation of the APRM process at the Member State level. In addition to providing guidance in terms of policy direction, the NGC ensures professionalism, credibility and independence of the national APRM self-assessment and review processes. The NGC is composed of key stakeholder groups from government, civil society and the private sector, in line with the APRM principle of broad-based participation.

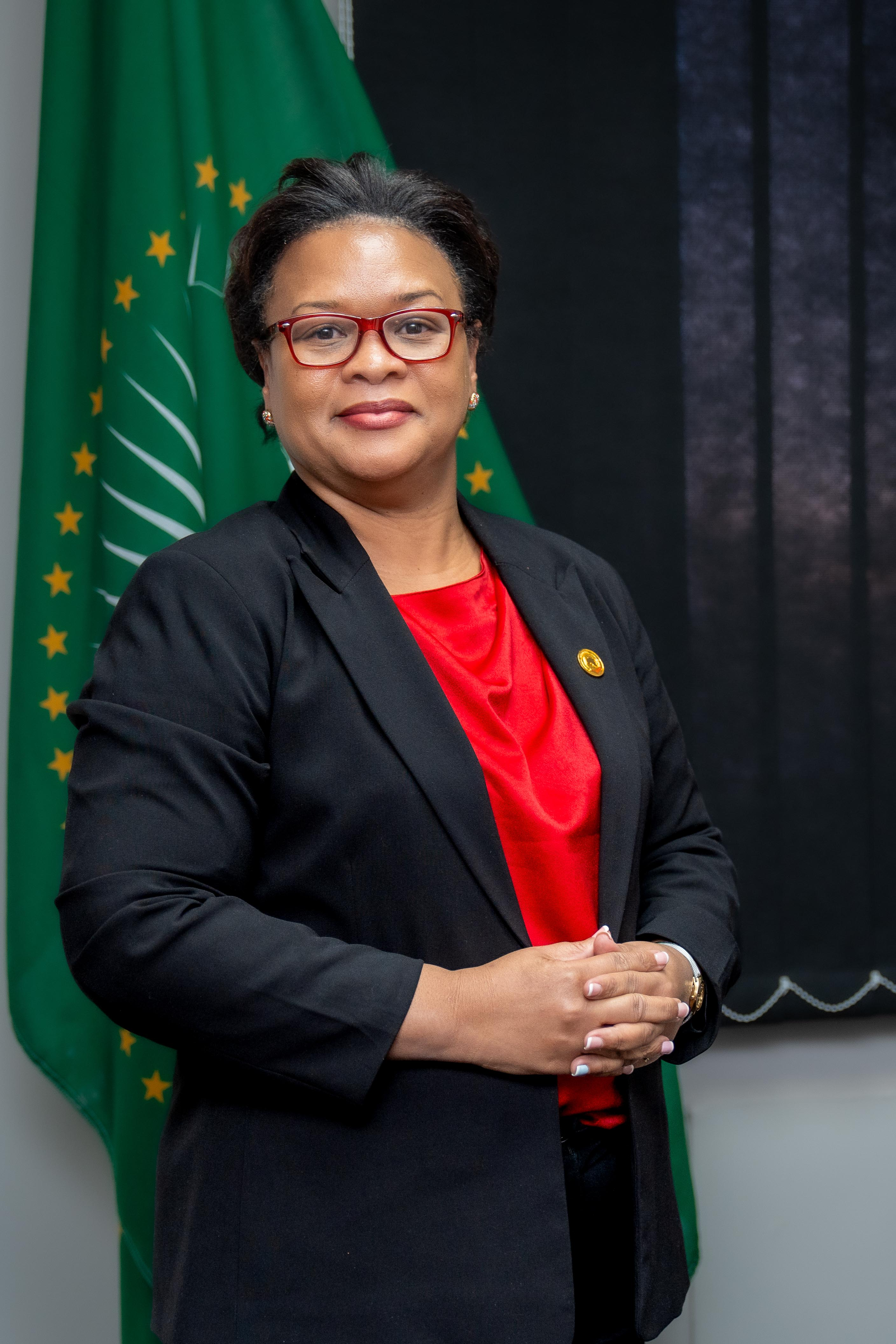
Chief Executive Officer, APRM Continental Secretariat - Ambassador Marie Antoinette Rose-Quatre

Management of the APRM Continental Secretariat

The APRM Secretariat is currently managed by H.E. Ambassador Marie-Antoinette Rose Quatre, Chief Executive Officer (CEO). The continental structure works in collaboration with the National Focal Points and the National Commissions / National Governing Councils.

APRM SECRETARIAT

Provides technical, coordinating and administrative support services. It must have sufficient capacity for the analytical work that underpins the peer review process.

== Membership of the APRM ==
Membership of the APRM is voluntary and open to all African Union (AU) countries. Accession begins with an expression of interest in membership followed by the signing of a Memorandum of Understanding (MoU) between the country and the APR Forum.

As of 2024, the African Peer Review Mechanism (APRM) comprises 44 member states, with the Central African Republic (CAR) acceding during the 33rd APR Forum on February 6, 2024. Among these members, 26 countries have completed their first-generation peer reviews, 5 have undergone second-generation reviews, and 12 have participated in targeted peer reviews.

- Algeria
- Angola
- Benin
- Botswana
- Burkina Faso
- Cameroon
- Chad
- Côte d'Ivoire
- Djibouti
- Egypt
- Equatorial Guinea
- Ethiopia
- Gabon
- Gambia
- Ghana
- Kenya
- Lesotho
- Liberia
- Malawi
- Mali
- Mauritania
- Mauritius
- Mozambique
- Niger
- Namibia
- Nigeria
- Republic of Congo
- Rwanda
- São Tomé and Príncipe
- Senegal
- Seychelles
- Sierra Leone
- South Africa
- Sudan
- Tanzania
- Togo
- Tunisia
- Uganda
- Zambia
- Zimbabwe

== Strategic partners ==
The APRM has entered into special support agreements with partner institutions designated by the Forum as Strategic Partners. These are: African Capacity Building Foundation (ACBF), the African Development Bank (AfDB); Mo Ibrahim Foundation; United Nations Economic Commission for Africa (UNECA); Office of the Special Advisor on Africa (OSAA); United Nations Development Programme (UNDP) Regional Bureau for Africa.

== See also ==
- New Partnership for Africa's Development
- African Unions

== Bibliography ==
=== APRM documents ===
- APRM Base document The APRM base document
- Memorandum of Understanding on the APRM The Memorandum of Understanding (MOU)
- Guidelines Guidelines for Countries to prepare for and participate in the APRM
- Organisation and Processes Organisation and Processes
- The objectives, standards, criteria and indicators for the APRM. Retrieved 27 May 2006.
- The Africa Governance Report 2019

=== Critiques and studies of the APRM process ===
- An Analysis of the Implementation of the African Peer Review Mechanism in Ghana, Kenya and Mauritius Grant Masterson, EISA, February 2005
- NEPAD’s APRM: A Progress Report, Practical Limitations and Challenges Paper by Ayesha Kajee on the APRM, 2004, retrieved 27 May 2006.
- Becoming my brother's keeper eAfrica October 2003 by Ross Herbert, retrieved 27 May 2006.
- The APRM process in Kenya: A pathway to a new state? Report by OSIEA/AfriMAP, April 2007
- Critical review of the African Peer Review Mechanism Process in Rwanda Report by Ligue des Droits de la Personne dans la Région des Grands Lacs (LDGL), January 2007
- Between Hope and Scepticism: Civil Society and the African Peer Review Mechanism Partnership Africa Canada, October 2005
- Strategies for promoting effective stakeholder participation in the African Peer Review Mechanism, UNECA, 2005
- Inadequately Self-Critical: Rwanda’s Self-Assessment for the African Peer Review Mechanism Eduard Jordaan, African Affairs, April 2006
- Effective Stakeholder Participation. in the APRM Process for the Promotion. of Democratic Governance:. A Case Study of Ghana, Eric Opoku, UNDP, December 2006
- Ghana and the APRM: A Critical Assessment, Adotey Bing-Pappoe, AfriMAP & OSIWA, June 2007
- The African Peer Review Mechanism in Mauritius: Lessons from Phase I Sheila Bunwaree, AfriMAP & OSISA, August 2007
- Further analysis of the African Peer Review Mechanism and the ECA/OECD-DAC Mutual Review of Development Effectiveness in the context of NEPAD Report to the UN High Level Task Force on the Implementation of the Right to Development, January 2008
- The African Peer Review Mechanism: Lessons from the Pioneers, Ross Herbert and Steven Gruzd, South African Institute of International Affairs, March 2008
- Civil Society Participation in Uganda’s APRM Process Juliet Nakato Odoi, SAIIA, June 2008
- Assessing South Africa’s APRM: An NGO Perspective, Nick Hutchings, Mukelani Dimba, and Alison Tilley, SAIIA, June 2008
- Addressing the African Peer Review Mechanism's Programmes of Action, Faten Aggad, SAIIA, June 2008
- Understanding APRM Research: Planning, Process and Politics. A Practical Handbook for Peer Review Research, George Katito, SAIIA, June 2008
- The African Peer Review Process in Nigeria, Adele Jinadu, AfriMAP, August 2008
- Benin and the African Peer Review Mechanism: Consolidating Democratic Achievements Gilles Badet, AfriMAP, August 2008
- Making the News: Why the APRM Didn't, Brendan Boyle, SAIIA, September 2008
- Media Freedom, Transparency and Governance, Raymond Louw, SAIIA, September 2008
