= Botswana Center for Public Integrity =

- Abbreviation: BCPI
- Type: International non-governmental organization
- Purpose: Combat corruption, crime prevention
- Headquarters: Gaborone, Botswana
- Location(s): 2704 Phala; Gaborone, Botswana
- Region served: Botswana
- Executive Director: Pusetso Morapedi
- Website: bcpi.org.bw

Botswana Center for Public Integrity (BCPI) is a Botswana non-governmental organization that works to increase transparency (social), integrity and accountability in Botswana through the provision of policy-oriented research, monitoring, capacity building and advocacy on political corruption and aid effectiveness.

== Organizational values ==
BCPI's values are as follows;

- Accountability and Responsibility
- Cooperation and Partnership
- Integrity and Honesty
- Impartiality and Non-Partisan
- Transparency and Openness

== See also ==
- Corruption Watch (South Africa)
- Directorate on Corruption and Economic Crime
- International Anti-Corruption Conference
