= List of Cameroonian actors =

This is a list of notable Cameroonian actors and actresses.

== Actors ==
=== A ===
- Axel Abessolo

=== B ===
- Alphonse Beni
- François Bingono Bingono
- Achille Brice
- Louis Brody

=== C ===
- Chief Epey JR
- Chief Jeo
- Shengang R Claude
- Babila Clovis

=== D ===
- Asobo De
- LucFosther Diop

=== E ===
- Eriq Ebouaney
- Kurt Egyiawan
- Jean Pierre Essome
- Agbor Gilbert Ebot

=== G ===
- Yann Gael
- Agbor Gilbert Ebot

=== J ===
- Epule Jeffrey
- Enah Johnscott

=== K ===
- Daniel Kamwa

=== M ===
- Alenne Menget

=== N ===
- Ivan Namme
- Nkanya Nkwai
- Anurin Nwunembom

=== S ===
- Vitalis Otia Suh

=== V ===
- Nchifor Valery
- Achiri Victor

=== Y ===
- Eystein Young Dingha Junior
- Bechem Bisong BB
- Chu Eu
- Dupree Koual
- Eriq Ebouaney
- Eyombo Basil Jr
- Eystein Young Jr
- Fonde Collins
- Gerard Esomba
- Ivan Namme
- Kang Quintus
- Lynno Lovert
- Mathieu Banye Senjo
- Neba Godwill Awatu
- Nchini Justin
- Nkanya Nkwai
- Nsoh Piepanse
- Onyama Laura
- Pascal Moma
- Prince Toboh Serdrick
- Roy Ntinwa
- Seehoofer N. Roland
- Sumbai Ekane Epie
- Tanhoh Ramin Funwie
- Vugah Samson
- Yannick Davidson Annoh

== Actresses ==
=== B ===
- N Sylvia-Bright Bi
- Joyce Bikidik
- Bibish Bright

=== C ===
- Syriette Che

=== D ===
- Alvine Diba
- Nsang Dilong
- Sahndra Fon Dufe

=== E ===
- Adela Elad
- Brenda Elung
- Syndy Emade

=== F ===
- Faith Fidel
- Roseline Fonkwa
- Catherine Fri
- Tantoh Ramin Funwie

=== G ===
- Charlotte Gobina

=== I ===
- Quinny Ijang
- Lina Ikechuju

=== J ===
- Prisma James
- Wang Jenif

=== K ===
- Ade Kelly

=== L ===
- Onyama Laura
- Memba Lucie

=== M ===
- Malvis-Ann Mohvu

=== N ===
- Relindis Nchang
- Gladys Ndonyi
- Ruth Nkweti

=== Y ===
- Solange Yijika

== See also ==
- Cinema of Cameroon
- List of Cameroonian films
- Cameroon Film Industry
- List of Cameroonians
