= List of Cameroonian films =

This is a list of films produced in Cameroon, from the 1960s to the present day.

== 1970s ==
- Le prix de la liberté (1978)
- Muna Moto (1975)
- Ribo ou le soleil sauvage (1978)

== 1980 ==
- Notre fille by Daniel Kamwa (1980), entered into the 12th Moscow International Film Festival

== 1983 ==
- Histoires drôles et drôles de gens by Jean-Pierre Dikongue Pipa (1983)

== 1985 ==
- Chocolat

== 1995 ==
- Le grand blanc de Lambaréné by Bassek Ba Kobhio (1995)

== 1996 ==
- Clando by Jean-Marie Téno

== 2000 ==
- Yahan Ameena Bikti Hai

== 2003 ==
- Le silence de la forêt

== 2004 ==
- Moolaadé (2004)

== 2005 ==
- Les Saignantes Directed by Jean Pierre Bekolo (2005)
- Sisters in Law by Florence Ayissi(2005)

== 2007 ==
- Volcanic Sprint

== 2017 ==
- A Man For The Weekend directed by Achille Brice and produced by Syndy Emade (2017)
- Breach of Trust Directed by Nkanya Nkwai and produced by Roseline Fonkwa featuring Epule Jeffrey
- Apple For Two Directed by Enah Johnscott and produced by Elung Brenda Shey

== 2018 ==
- Le serpent de Bronze by Thierry Ntamack

== 2019 ==
- Broken directed by Anurin Nwunembom and produced by Syndy Emade

== 2020 ==
- Therapy is directed by Anurin Nwunembom & Musing Derick The movie dramatises a dysfunctional couple that hires the services of an unconventional therapist in an effort to solve their marital troubles. Mr. Lima is almost losing his mind over his wife's psychological pain. The methods of Dr. Benedicta leads the couple to discover truths that threaten the couple more.
- The Fisherman's Diary by Enah Johnscott. A 12-year-old girl - Ekah (Faith Fidel) - is inspired by Malala Yousafzai's story and is determined to get an education. In a village of uneducated fishermen, she gets entangled with her father's - Solomon (Kang Quintus) - past experience with girl child education.

== 2021 ==
- Hidden Dreams by Nchini Justin

== 2022 ==
- Love Trap
- The Planters Plantation by Eystein Young Dingha.
- Half-Heaven
- Kuvah

== 2023 ==
- L'Axe Lourd (The Highway) Directed by Nkeng Stephen
- Nganù Directed by Kang Quintus
