= Solange Yijika =

Cameroonian actress

- Born: Solange Yijika; Cameroon
- Education: University of Yaoundé II
- Occupations: Actress, activist, film producer
- Years active: 2005-present
- Known for: Expression the Courage to Heal (2017)

Solange Yijika is a Cameroonian actress also much present in the Nigerian theatre and film producer, as well as an activist for women and children's rights. She is the most celebrated actress in the Central African sub-region and the main figure of the Cameroon International Film Festival (CAMIFF).

== Life and education ==
Yijika hails from North West Cameroon. She graduated from the University of Yaoundé II, Soa, Cameroon.

== Career ==
Yijika had been an important face in the Cameroon Film Industry since her first appearance about the year 2005. In two anti-malaria campaign posters in Cameroon sponsored by the Global Fund for the fight against Malaria, Tuberculosis and AIDS, she was used as a model in the posters. She is also a global justice activist for women and children. She was an ambassador of the first edition of the Cameroon International Film Festival (CAMIFF) in 2016.

Yijika had featured in the Cameroonian movie industry in many productions numbering about 20 and is a recipient of many award nominations including AMAA and NAFCA awards.

She starred in the "Trials of Passion" 2006 TV Series, shown on CRTV, in which she played the role of "Diana". She afterwards in 2008 featured in "Mark of the Absolute", a movie which Asaba Ferdinand directed and produced. Next was the 2009 "Land of Shadows", a movie produced by Agbor Gilbert Ebot and directed by Zack Orji and Neba Lawrence. The film also featured Jim Iyke. That same year, she also again featured in the movie "Great Pain" directed by Neba Lawrence, and later, still in the same year featured in "Royal Destiny", a Cameroonian movie which also featured Emeka Ike and Tonto Dikeh, two Nollywood actors. She, in 2012 featured in "Troubled Kingdom", a movie directed by Neba Lawrence, co-produced by the US-based film producer Mairo Sanda and South African-based Fred K. Keyanti - who praised the actress's expertise.

Still in 2012, she was starred in the Nollywood movie, "Blood or Wine", produced by Henry Neba Awantoh and Jim Iyke and directed by Neba Lawrence, screenwritten by Ruth Kadiri.

In 2013, she was nomination for the SONNAH Awards.

She appeared in the movie, "Decoded", produced by Brenda Elung - also an actress and directed by Akim Macaulay and Enah Johnscott in 2013, in which she acted alongside both Ghanaian and Cameroonian actors such as Van Vicker, Jeffery Epule and Desmond Wyte.

She was one of the two moderators on the Panel Discussion at the 2016 edition of the African Achievers Awards Ceremony, held on July 8 at the International Conference Centre, Abuja, Nigeria alongside Richard Mofe Damijo, a Nigerian actor and politician.

In the 2017 movie, "Expression the Courage to Heal", directed by Musing Derick Tening and produced by Tessy Eseme, she played the role of "Jazmine Juma". The movie was premiered in London.

She was nominated for an award in the second edition of the CAMIFF Awards, held between April 24–29, 2017 at Buea, Cameroon with other Camerwood and Nollywood actors also nominated. She was one of the sponsors of the CAMIFF 2018 edition alongside Nollywood's Ramsey Nouah.

== Filmography ==
Year	Film	Role	Notes	Ref.
2017	Expression the Courage to Heal			
2017 -	Samba		TV series	
2013	Decoded			
2012	Blood or Wine			
2012	Troubled Kingdom			
2009	Royal Destiny			
2009	Great Pain			
2009	Land of Shadows			
2008	Mark of the Absolute			
2006 -	Trials of Passion	Diana	TV series	

== Accolades ==
Year	Event	Result
2017	Cameroon International Film Festival	Nominated
2013	SONNAH Awards	Nominated

== See also ==
- List of Cameroonian actors
