= Bandy Kiki =

Cameroonian blogger, LGBT activist and entrepreneur

- Born: Emily Kinaka Banadzem; 20 February 1991 (age 35); Jakiri, Cameroon
- Education: University of Yaounde
- Occupations: Blogger; Entrepreneur; LGBT activist
- Website: kinnakasblog.com

Bandy Kiki (20 February 1991) is a Cameroonian blogger, LGBT activist and a serial entrepreneur based in the U.K. She is the creator of Kinnaka's Blog, a high traffic English-speaking website in Cameroon for news and entertainment. She is a controversial figure due to her political views and LGBT activism, and has been called "The Most Hated Anglophone On Social Media in Cameroon."

== Education ==
She moved to Bolton from Cameroon in 2011, where she studied at the University of Bolton.

== Background ==
Kiki was born Emily Kinaka Banadzem on 20 February 1991 in Jakiri, Cameroon.

== Career ==
Kiki started her career as a blogger in the UK, in a daily published online blog Kinnaka's Blog and Kinnaka's TV, launched in 2015. Her blog is one of the most frequented by anglophone Cameroonians. In 2016, she was listed among the 50 most influential Cameroonian youths under the age of 40 by Avance Media, CELBMD Africa and partners. Kiki was crowned Best Cameroonian Media CAMEEA in 2015 and won "Best 2016 Blogger" from Diaspora Entertainment Awards. Kiki is a spokesperson for the Rainbow Equality Hub, an NGO that supports LGBT people in Cameroon. In 2017, she was nominated for best African Blogger of the Year Award By AWA. In a May 2017 interview, Kiki announced she would be assisting Irène Major with the Gay in Africa Foundation. She also gave an interview to the Humen Online Hungarian gay magazine, which is also available in Hungarian language.

== Controversy and attacks ==
She was criticized for her controversial post on her blog following the ongoing 2016–2017 Cameroonian protests. She received extensive abuse online, including the spread of unsubstantiated rumors claiming Kiki was HIV-positive and that she is an agent of the Cameroon government attempting to sabotage the ongoing crisis. Kiki has denied those claims. Kiki has been criticized for being gay and supporting LGBT rights in Cameroon. In one example, film producer Agbor Gilbert Ebot stated that ''...If I catch you for Cameroon, I go 'rape' you well well so that di demon of lesbianism go comot for your body…I get plans to give you belle..." She has been the subject of death threats.

== See also ==
- List of Cameroonian Actors
- Cinema of Cameroon
