= Pamela Happi =

Cameroonian television personality

Miss P
- Born: Pamela Happi; 1989 (age 36–37); Bamenda, Cameroon
- Education: University of Buea
- Occupations: TV presenter, content producer, philanthropist

Pamela Happi is a Cameroonian television personality. She is known for The Miss P Show, which is sponsored by Orange Cameroon and aims at promoting the youth to have self-confidence and to build better careers.

== Background ==
Happi was born Cameroonian, but no information about her background and date of birth has been published. Some sources say she was born in 1989.

== Career ==
Happi started her professional career as a TV presenter in Douala, on a talk show known as The Miss P Show, launched in April 2015 with Orange Cameroon. "We are not confined to a set of rules. We will adapt to the needs of our audience but our DNA is providing info and entertainment to people of our (my) generation", Pamela told Camerounweb. Her original idea was to build the confidence of youth to become starters of their world through her talk show. In September 2015 she visited the God First Orphanage with her team, including Nigeria star Alexx Ekubo, to wrap up season 1 of her show.

She was listed amongst the most influential Cameroonians between 15 and 49 years in the category of Media by Avance Media & COSDEF Group 2016 edition. She was amongst the moderators of the All Africa Music Awards (AFRIMA) ceremony in Lagos, Nigeria 2016.

== Awards and recognition ==
Year	Award	Category	Recipient	Result
2016	Most Influential Cameroonian by (Avance Media & COSDEF Group)	Best Actress	Herself	Nominated

== See also ==
- List of Cameroonian Actors
- Cinema of Cameroon
