= Stephanie Tum =

- Born: Stephanie Tum; 2 December 1987 (age 38); Bamenda, Cameroon
- Education: University of Buea
- Occupations: Actress, Model, humanitarian, entrepreneur
- Notable work: The Planters Plantation
- Children: Mutta, Chris

Stephanie Tum is a Cameroonian actress, model and philanthropist. She is known for her role in the 2011 movie Pink Poison.

== Career ==
Stephanie, started her acting career in 2009 and quit the screen until her return in 2013 in the movie "Viri" according to an interview with celebrity website Dcodedtv, she explains her reason for the long break:

“I couldn’t concentrate on work, my career as an actress and my family all at the same time, I have returned now because I am at a right place in my life to take chances to fully commit myself in my acting career since I no longer work in the oilfield and have more time to myself to pursue my passion and other interest. I am dedicated to building my career as an actress/producer and take care of my family”.

She recently starred in the Cinema of Cameroon in Shrill and Little Cindy movies in 2018. She was listed amongst the most influential Cameroonians between 15–49 years in the category of entertainment by Avance Media & COSDEF Group 2018 edition and Best Social Media Campaign for Mental Health Awareness by Bonteh Digital Awards.

== Personal life ==
Tum is a mother of two boys. In 2018 she began a charity foundation to sensitize young women on menstrual hygiene, and to distribute free sanitary pads. Her campaign GirlsAndHygiene seeks to promote and encourage safe and clean physical practices among young girls in Cameroon.

== Filmography ==
- Pink Poison (2011) with Agbor Gilbert Ebot
- Viri (As a Cocky lawyer) 2013.
- Shrill (As a slay queen)
- Little Cindy (2017)
- The Giant Broom
- The Planters Plantation (2022)

== Awards and recognition ==
Year	Award	Category	Recipient	Result
2018	Most Influential Cameroonian by (Avance Media & COSDEF Group)	Entertainment	Herself	Nominated
Year	Award	Category	Recipient	Result
2017	Bonteh Digital Awards	Best Social Media Campaign for Mental Health Awareness	Herself	Nominated

== See also ==
- List of Cameroonian Actors
- Cinema of Cameroon
