= Brenda Elung =

Cameroonian film producer, actress

- Born: Brenda Shey; Cameroon
- Other name: Madam Brenda
- Occupations: Actress, film producer
- Known for: Samba (TV series 2017 -)
- Spouse: Elung

Brenda Shey Elung is a Cameroonian actress and film producer. She is the Vice President of the Cameroon Film Industry (CFI). She is also fondly called "Madam Brenda".

== Career ==
Brenda has been a part of the Cameroonian Film Industry since 2010.

She produced and starred in the movie, "Decoded", directed by Akim Macaulay and Enah Johnscott, which was released in 2013. The movie was shot in August 2012 at Limbe, Cameroon, featuring the Ghanaian actor, Van Vicker and Cameroonian actors such as Solange Yijika, Jeffery Epule and Desmond Wyte.

She was one of the cinematographic moguls who assembled in Buea in a three-day workshop (August 31 - September 2, 2016) to discuss the revamping of the ailing film industry in Cameroon.

In 2017, her TV Series, "SAMBA" which she produced, starring Camerwood actors like Jeffery Epule, Kelly Ade, Nsang Dilong, Marie Nyna, Solange Yijika, herself, and others; written by Proxy Buh Melvin; and directed by Enah Johnscott, was released. The movie later went ahead to win the Official Selection award in the FESPACO awards of 2017, and Best Series award in the Écrans Noirs awards in 2018. In Accra, Ghana, during the Golden Movie Awards Africa (GMAA) 2017, the popular television series received three awards; with the Best Actress award going to Ade Kelly, Best Actor award to Libota McDonald and the film getting the Best TV Series award.

In the seventh edition of the AMVCA awards held at Eko Hotels and Suits in Lagos, Nigeria on March 14, 2020, she was notably the only representative of the Cameroon Film Industry (CFI) at the awards in which she was sighted elegantly dressed.

== Entrepreneurship ==
She is the founder of Omega One Entertainment, a film production company. She represented the company's business interests at the Nigerian International TV Submit held in Paris (April 13–14, 2018).

== Criticisms ==
In 2018, she received heavy attacks from fans on social media after being sighted wearing an elegant Russian made dress at the fifth edition of the AMVCA, accusing her of refusal to support home-based designers using huge international platforms such as the AMVCA, which she ignored. She, however, decided to act their plea out in the seventh edition of the award show in 2020 in which she appeared in a Limbe made designer outfit called TAS Design.

== Filmography ==
Year	Title	Role	Notes
2017 -	SAMBA	actress; producer	TV series
2013	Decoded		

== See also ==
- List of Cameroonian actors
