= Nsang Dilong =

Cameroonian actress (born 1994)

- Born: Bodi Nsang Dilong; 1994 (age 31–32); Buea, Southwest Region, Cameroon
- Education: University of Buea
- Occupations: Actress, model, social worker

Nsang Dilong born (Bodi Nsang Dilong) in August 1994 in Buea) is a Cameroonian actress, social worker and a model. She was the winner of the 2011 edition of the Miss West Africa Cameroon Competition (MWACC). In 2015, she was a TV host at Fox Broadcasting Company

== Early life ==
Nsang Dilong was born Bodi Nsang Dilong in Buea Cameroon. She is a native of Kotto Barombi in Kumba and no information about her real date of birth has been published. She was born around 1994. During her secondary school days, she studied at PCSS Buea and completed at PHS in Kumba. She earned a Bachelor of Science in Sociology in 2011 at the University of Buea.

== Career ==
In 2011, she won the Miss West Africa Cameroon Competition (MWACC). In 2013, she was a contestant in the Miss Cameroon Beauty Pageant, she has starred in movies such as Whisper, Expression, she also star in Zamba, an award-winning television series. In 2015, she was a Television host in a program called African-focus show meant for Fox Broadcasting Company (Fox 28). When the offer was given to her, she said

I'm truly humbled by this opportunity and hope to impact my career and that of several other Africans through it.

Apart from being a celebrity, she works as a social worker for an NGO in Buea. She was number 10 on the list of 2016 Ranking of 50 Most Influential Young Cameroonians by Avance Media & CELBMD Africa.

== Selected filmography ==
- Zamba (2016) with Epule Jeffrey
- Whisper (2012)
- Rumble
- Expression

== See also ==
- List of Cameroonian Actors
- Cinema of Cameroon
