= Akoachere Jane Francis =

Cameroonian microbiologist and public health academic

Jane Francis Akoachere
- Born: Jane-Francis Tatah Kihla Akoachere; Buea, Cameroon
- Education: University of Buea; Fulbright Scholar at University of Wisconsin-Milwaukee
- Occupations: Microbiologist, academic
- Years active: 1990s–present
- Employer: University of Buea
- Known for: Research on infectious diseases, antimicrobial resistance, public health
- Title: Professor of Microbiology

Jane Francis Akoachere (also published as Jane-Francis Tatah Kihla Akoachere) is a Cameroonian microbiologist, public health researcher, and academic whose career spans over two decades. She is a professor in the Department of Microbiology and Parasitology at the University of Buea and has conducted extensive research on infectious diseases, antimicrobial resistance, food and water safety, and public health issues in Cameroon.

== Early life and education ==
Akoachere was born in Buea, Cameroon, where she later pursued her higher education. Early in her academic career she was awarded a Fulbright Visiting Scholar Program grant which enabled her to conduct research as a lecturer at the *University of Wisconsin-Milwaukee* from September 2005 to June 2006.

She completed her advanced academic training in microbiology, environmental health, and related biomedical sciences, later rising through the academic ranks at the University of Buea where she has held various teaching and research roles.

== Academic career ==
Akoachere is a professor of microbiology in the Department of Microbiology and Parasitology at the University of Buea, Cameroon. Her research spans multiple facets of infectious disease epidemiology, environmental microbiology, antimicrobial resistance, and water and food safety.

Her areas of research include:

- Bacterial contamination of water sources and public health implications in Cameroonian cities.
- Determinants of vacuum-transmissible infections, such as cholera in health districts of Cameroon.
- Community knowledge and practices regarding neglected tropical diseases such as Buruli ulcer.

Additionally, she has contributed to research on urinary tract infections in children, antimicrobial resistance patterns, and co-infections involving malaria, HIV, and intestinal parasites.

== Public health research and contributions ==
Throughout her academic career, Akoachere has co-authored numerous empirical studies on public health issues impacting Cameroon and Sub-Saharan Africa, often emphasizing practical infection control, microbial ecology, and antibiotic resistance.

Her work investigating bacterial pathogens in healthcare settings and risk factors for wound infections in the Buea health district demonstrated the high prevalence of multidrug-resistant bacteria, raising awareness of infection control needs in clinical contexts.

== Administrative and leadership roles ==
In addition to her research, Akoachere has served in **academic leadership** within the Faculty of Science at the University of Buea, contributing to **curriculum development, postgraduate teaching, and postgraduate research supervision**.

She has also participated in scientific committees for national and international conferences, contributing to the development of bioscience research and professional networks in Cameroon.

== Selected chronology ==
- 2005–2006— Fulbright Visiting Scholar, University of Wisconsin-Milwaukee, USA
- 2014-05-02— Publication on wound infection and antimicrobial resistance in Buea health facilities
- 2016-05-26 — Co-authored study on Buruli ulcer transmission and practices
- 2023-10-17— Co-authored paper on malaria, HIV, and intestinal co-infections in adult patients

== See also ==
- University of Buea
- Microbiology in Cameroon
