= Ivan Namme =

Cameroonian movie actor

- Born: 1978 (age 47–48); Buea, Southwest Region (Cameroon)
- Citizenship: Cameroonian
- Occupations: producer, actor, journalist
- Years active: 2006–present

Ivan Namme is a Cameroonian movie actor, producer and a journalist He is the CEO of Nam Productions & producer of films such as "Smokescreen" (2016), "Barefoot On Broken Bottles"(2015, and "A Little Lie a Little Killed"(2014) In 2017, his film "A little lie A little at the Cameroon movie Achievement Awards.

== Career ==
Namme's International debut was (Before The Sunrise) with Nollywood actors in 2006 who came to Buea for the project, where he was head of communications. He did projects with Nigerian stars such has Fred Amata, Olu Jacobs and Dakore Egbuson. In 2017 he was listed among the top 10 Cameroonian Actors by Bareta news, Ivan, was nominated again for best dress actor by Cameroon fashion award (CFA) in men category.

== Selected filmography ==
- Barefoot on Broken Bottles (2016)
- Before the Sunrise (2006)
- Rumble (TV series, 2015)
- Smokescreen (2015)

== Awards and recognition ==
Year	Award	Category	Recipient	Result
2017	Cameroon Movie Achievement Awards 2017	Best film	Best film (A Little Lie A Little Kill)	Nominated
2017	Cameroon Fashion Award	Fashion	Himself (best dress actor)	Nominated

== See also ==
- List of Cameroonian Actors
- Cinema of Cameroon
