= Cameroon International Film Festival =

Annual Camerroon film festival

- Location: Buea, Cameroon
- Founded: 2016; 10 years ago
- Founded by: Agbor Gilbert Ebot
- Awards: Cameroon International Film Festival Award
- Language: International
- Website: camiff.cm

Cameroon International Film Festival (CAMIFF) is an annual film festival in Buea, Cameroon. created by actor and producer Agbor Gilbert Ebot in 2016. The goals of the festival is to create a platform where African and Cameroonian films can be showcased, cross-cultural exchanges made, and the growth of the domestic film industry promoted.

In addition to film screenings and industry events, CAMIFF also serves as an awards platform, recognizing outstanding achievements in African filmmaking.

== History ==
The festival was publicly declared in a press conference in Yaoundé on 30th January, 2016. The Cameroon International Film Festival (CAMIFF), was founded by Agbor Gilbert Ebot and conducted its first edition in Buea, Cameroon, South-West Region from 24th to 30th April, 2016.

The origin of the festival was motivated by a tour of the Africa International Film Festival in Calabar, Nigeria. According to Ebot, during his time in Nigeria, he had the chance of observing the development of the film industry in Nigeria and was inspired to create a platform where international buyers would be attracted and create opportunities for English-speaking filmmakers in Cameroon. According to CAMIFF organizers, the purpose of the festival was to unite people from all film-related professions such as actors, directors, scriptwriters, cinematographers, sound engineers, editors, lighting technicians, and students, as well as manufacturers of cinematographic equipment and media people in general.

CAMIFF's first edition was organized with the sponsorship of the Ministry of Arts and Culture of Cameroon and the Embassy of the United States of America in Cameroon. According to the organizers, the emergence of this festival was motivated by the lack of film festivals in Cameroon. The number of films submitted for the competition for the first edition was 600 films, and it went up to 1,215 films in the second edition. And went above 2,000 films in preparation for the third edition. Additionally, the festival faced some financial challenges due to lack of sponsorship from private firms and even government institutions.

The festival’s first edition featured notable attendees including Cameroon’s Minister of Arts and Culture, Narcisse Mouelle Kombi, as well as actors Ramsey Nouah and Ruth Nkweti. The third edition was held from April 23 to 28, 2018.

The fourth edition faced multiple postponements. Initially scheduled for April 22 to 27, 2019, in Buea, it was cancelled due to heightened tensions related to the Anglophone crisis in Cameroon. A second postponement occurred in 2020, with plans to reschedule in April 2021 disrupted by the COVID-19 pandemic. The ninth edition took place in April 2025.

== Format and activities ==
The week-long festival includes film screenings, panel discussions, masterclasses, workshops, and networking sessions. It welcomes entries in various categories including feature films, short films, documentaries, and student films. The festival also hosts red carpet events, award ceremonies, and cultural exhibitions that celebrate the diversity of African storytelling.

=== Notable guests and collaborations ===
Over the years, CAMIFF has hosted several notable African and international filmmakers, actors, and producers. Guests have included Nollywood actors like Ramsey Nouah and Richard Mofe-Damijo, as well as filmmakers from the United States, Europe, and other parts of Africa.

The festival has also formed partnerships with film organizations such as the Pan African Film Festival (PAFF) in Los Angeles and the Zanzibar International Film Festival, aiming to promote cross-cultural collaborations.

== Awards categories ==
Each year, CAMIFF presents awards in categories such as:

- Best Feature Film
- Best Short Film
- Best Documentary
- Best Actor and Actress
- Best Director
- Best Student Film

The awards are intended to recognize excellence in filmmaking and acting, and to encourage young and emerging talent in Africa.

== List of common film awards categories ==
2016 (CAMIFF) Awards

Awards
Award	Winner

2017 (CAMIFF) Awards

Category Awards
Awards	Winners
Best feature film	Overnight Flies
Best short film	Enemy of Time
Best documentary film	Africa
Best Cameroon film	Kiss of Death
Best Actor	Thierry Ntamack
Best Actress	Onyama Laura
Best Director	Georg Tiller
Lifetime achievement Award	Tangyie Peter Suh-Nfor

2024 (CAMIFF) Awards

Awards
Awards	Winners	Ref
Best Actor	Enyinna Nwigwe (Nigeria)	

2025 (CAMIFF) Awards

Category Awards
Awards	Winners
Best feature International film	Conversations In Transit (Nigeria)
Best short International film	Superman Doesn't Steal (USA)
Best Documentary film	Godsterminal (Austria)
Best Online Social Content Creator	Akamba Comedia (Audienc Choice Award)
Best Overall Actor	Richard Mofe-Damijo
Best Overall Actress	Jeanne Benti
Best Cameroon Film	The Dead Man's Wish
Best Cameroon Actor	Otia Vitalise Suh - (The Dead Man's Wish)
Best Cameroon Actress	Lum Nora Neba
Best short film Cameroon	Kuma- Weight Of Silence
Best Film Director	Robert Peters (Conversation In Transit)
Best Screenplay	Kismet
Best Cinematographer	Takong Delvis (The Dead Man's Wish)
Honorary Awards	Chioma Ude (Nigeria)
Best Tv Series	Ewusu
Best Community Film	His Word (Douala Film Community)

== Impact ==
CAMIFF has significantly contributed to the growth of Cameroon’s film industry by attracting international attention, providing a space for professional development, and encouraging the production and distribution of high-quality films. It has also helped to position Buea as a cultural hub in the region.
