= Therapy (disambiguation) =

Therapy is the attempted remediation of a health problem.

Therapy may also refer to:

- Psychotherapy

== Music ==
- Therapy?, a rock band from Northern Ireland

=== Albums ===
- Therapy (Anne-Marie album) or the title song, 2021
- Therapy (James Whild Lea album), 2007
- Therapy (Loudon Wainwright III album) or the title song, 1989
- Therapy (MiChi album) or the title song, 2012
- Therapy (Diatribe EP) or the title song, 1991
- Therapy (Tech N9ne EP), 2013
- Therapy (Zoe Wees album), 2023

=== Songs ===
- "Therapy" (Armin van Buuren song), 2018
- "Therapy" (The Damned song), 1980
- "Therapy" (T-Pain song), 2008
- "Therapy" (Mary J. Blige song), 2014
- "Therapy" (Budjerah song), 2023
- "Therapy", by Adéla from Prima, 2026
- "Therapy", by the Alchemist from Chemical Warfare, 2009
- "Therapy", by All Time Low from Nothing Personal, 2009
- "Therapy", by Axium from Blindsided, 2003
- "Therapy", by Brooke Fraser, 2016
- "Therapy", by Conro, 2020
- "Therapy", by Duke Dumont, 2020
- "Therapy", by Heltah Skeltah from Nocturnal, 1996
- "Therapy", by India.Arie from Testimony: Vol. 2, Love & Politics, 2009
- "Therapy", by Infectious Grooves from The Plague That Makes Your Booty Move... It's the Infectious Grooves, 1991
- "Therapy", by Khalid from American Teen, 2017
- "Therapy", by Kim Cesarion, 2016
- "Therapy", by Maisie Peters from The Good Witch, 2023
- "Therapy", by Relient K from Forget and Not Slow Down, 2009

== Literature ==
- Therapy (Fitzek novel), a 2006 novel by Sebastian Fitzek
- Therapy (Kellerman novel), a 2004 novel by Jonathan Kellerman
- Therapy (Lodge novel), a 1995 novel by David Lodge
- Therapy (journal), now Clinical Practice, a medical journal

== Other uses ==
- Therapy (New York City), a gay bar and nightclub in Manhattan
- Therapy (film), a 2021 Cameroonian film
- "Therapy" (Not Going Out), a 2013 television episode
- "Therapy" (Roseanne), a 1992 television episode

== See also ==
- List of therapies
- List of psychotherapies
