= Breach of Trust (2017 film) =

- Directed by: Nkanya Nkwai
- Produced by: Roseline Fonkwa
- Starring: Epule Jeffrey; Chris Allen; Princess Brun Njua; Gelam Dickson
- Release date: 9 June 2017
- Running time: 70 munites
- Country: Cameroon
- Language: English

Breach of Trust is a 2017 Cameroonian film featuring actors from the UK, Cameroon, and Nigeria which explores perceptions of incest as a taboo and views of perpetrators. The film is produced by Roseline Fonkwa.

== Plot ==
Breach of Trust tells us the story of the lives of two families who try to live a normal life but unfortunately one of the family members in each household sexually abuses these young girls. These abusers and parents are in a position of trust but they choose to sexually abuse their young family members. It is an epic story that explores how we perceive incest as a taboo and instead of addressing it and dealing with it, standing up to the abusers, protecting the victims, supporting the victims to stand up to their abusers and put an end to the abuse or the cycle, it is instead concealed due to societal pressures, fear, guilt, not knowing whom to talk to, where to get support from, feeling threatened, wanting to protect the abuser's image, reputation, family name and even the fear of not being believed. The feelings are numerous and as a society, most people have chosen to keep this form of abuse a secret leaving the victims and others to suffer as well as letting the abusers carry out repeated acts of failing to get treatment.

== Cast ==
- Chris Allen as The Mayor of London
- Princess Brun Njua as Oler Array
- Gelam Dickson as Mr. Tabi
- Mirabelle Ade as Enanga's Mum
- Epule Jeffrey as Paul Achang
- Susan Kempling Oben as Mrs. Tabi
- Martha Muambo as Enanga Achang
- Whitney Raine as Young Array

== Release ==
Breach of Trust was released on 9 June 2017.

== Reception ==
The movie was premiered at the Odeon Cinemas Greenwich London. Celebrity website fabafriq described the movie as "the revolutionary movie set to change the face of Cameroon Movie Industry." The movie was premiered in Douala on October 21, 2017.

== See also ==
- List of Cameroonian films
- Cinema of Nigeria
