= Zoneziwoh Mbondgulo-Wondieh =

- Born: 26 March 1985 (age 41); Cameroon
- Citizenship: Cameroonian
- Education: University of Buea and University of Aberdeen
- Occupations: Researcher, gender activist.
- Years active: 2009-present
- Organization(s): Women for a Change, Cameroon
- Awards: Global Citizen Award for Humanitarian Reporting and Storytelling and Mandela Washington Fellowship

Zoneziwoh Mbondgulo-Wondieh is a Cameroonian feminist advocate, storyteller, and researcher working to advance women's rights and feminist leadership across Africa. As the founder and executive director of Women for a Change Cameroon (Wfac), she leads programs on sexual and reproductive health and rights, feminist movement-building, and youth leadership.

== Early life and education ==
Zoneziwoh Mbondgulo-Wondieh was born on March 26, 1985. She earned a bachelor's degree in environmental science from the University of Buea in Cameroon. She continued her education at Buea and earned a Master of Social Science degree in Ssx and gender studies. She then earned a Master of Social Sciences in sex, gender, and violence from the University of Aberdeen in Scotland.This was followed by earning a doctorate in international relations and conflict at Buea.

== Career ==
As a humanitarian reporter and writer, she was recognized with the Global Citizen Award for Humanitarian Reporting and Storytelling and selected for the Obama–Mandela Fellowship for Young African Leaders. In 2024, she convened the Central Africa Feminist Forum on Beijing+30, reminding participants that “the journey continues, and together, we are making history.”

Mbondgulo-Wondieh has experience in gender and digital activism, movement building, policy advocacy, and youth leadership. She is the founder and executive director of Women for a Change (Wfac) in Cameroon. She frequently travels to the rural communities in Cameroon to carry out peer-to-peer sexuality education, conduct interviews, hold focus group discussions, and organize leadership training and workshops with youth and young women.

Mbondgulo-Wondieh has led Women for a Change, an organization that has reached over a million girls and women throughout central Africa. Over a thousand young women have been trained in advocacy and women's rights. The organization has advocated for the inclusion of the voices of African women in governmental policy and decision-making. Under her guidance, Women for a Change has been instrumental in translating and raising awareness on national and international women's rights protocols and frameworks, including the Maputo (Mozambique) protocol and the Beijing (China) Platform for Action.

In 2019, Mbondgulo-Wondieh launched a Central African advocacy platform, GenEgalité ECCAS, to advance women's rights in the sub-region. She was appointed to the civil society advisory group for the Generation Equality Forum, the 2021 world gathering of government leaders, civil society organizations and corporate CEOs committed to accelerating progress on women's rights on the 25th anniversary of the Fourth World Conference on Women in Beijing.
