= Angeline Solange Bonono =

Cameroonian writer (1975–2025)

- Born: 2 March 1975; Cameroon
- Died: 15 May 2025 (aged 50); Évry, Île-de-France, France
- Occupations: Teacher, novelist, actress, playwright, theatre director

Angeline Solange Bonono (2 March 1975 – 15 May 2025) was a Cameroonian teacher, novelist, actress, playwright and theatre director.

== Biography ==
=== Early life ===
Angeline Solange Bonono was born on 2 March 1975. Her parents were teachers and youth counsellors. Her father died in 1979. She attended secondary school at the bilingual high school in Essos, Yaoundé.

Her academic journey included a bachelor's degree with an option in German, a bachelor's degree in French literature, a master's degree in theatre studies, another master's degree in French literature, a diploma in general high school teaching (DIPES II), and an advanced studies diploma (DEA) in French literature.

=== Writing ===
In 1981, Angeline performed in the troupe of the bilingual college of Ngoa-Ekellé, playing Kabeyene ou à qui la faute by Julien Mfoulou, later televised. In 1982, she performed in La Secrétaire particulière by Jean Pliya.

She contributed to three collective books. The first, D'aujourd'hui: 15 poètes camerounais, included her work Que la poésie soit avec vous with 14 other Cameroonian poets. The second, Les Balançoires, included her piece La femme que je suis devenue in 2006. The third, Cameroun mon pays, featured her work Apostolat de la fourchette in 2008.

She participated in writing residencies, festivals, and intellectual societies such as the Round of Poets alongside Pabé Mongo. Her literary works span various genres including novels, theatre, children's literature, and essays.

Angeline wrote and produced the screenplay Oui No with journalist François Bingono Bingono of Cameroon Radio Television (CRTV). She starred in the feature film Amours à hauts risques directed by Serge Alain Noa. In 2008, she won the Clé Editions award for Best Playwright for La Déesse Phalloga directed by Rodrigue Barbe at the fourth edition of the Francophone Theatre Scenes festival.

=== Teaching ===
Bonono taught French at high schools in Ebonè, Nkongsamba, Obala, at the Lycée général Leclerc in Yaoundé, and was a lecturer in African literature at the University of Yaoundé I. In 2008, she became a regional pedagogical inspector of French.

=== Death ===
Bonono died on 15 May 2025, at the age of 50.

== Literary contributions ==
Several authors have analyzed her works. Mokwe Edouard discusses her works in L'afrocentrisme dans la prose d'Angeline Solange Bonono as a response to reestablish Cameroon's and Africa's reputation. Raymond Mbassi Atéba explores the sexual idea brought to writing in his book La Plume androgyne d'Angeline Solange Bonono: du féminin à la masculinisation de l’écriture.

== Publications ==
=== Novels ===
- Marie-France, l'orpailleuse, L'harmattan, 2012
- Le Journal intime d'une épouse, éditions Sopecam, Yaoundé, 2007
- Bouillons de vie, éditions les PU Yaoundé, 2005

=== Short stories ===
- La Femme que je suis devenue, Editions Tropiques, Yaoundé, 2006

=== Theatre ===
- Déesse Phalloga, éditions Sopecam, Yaoundé, 2006

=== Poetry ===
- Soif Azur, éditions de la Ronde, Yaoundé, 2002
- Le Sang en détresse
- Apostolat de fourchette, 2008

=== Collective works ===
- D'aujourd'hui: 15 poètes camerounais, Édition du CCF de Douala, Édition Les cahiers de l'estuaire, Douala, 2007
- Cameroun mon pays, Edition Ifrikiya, 2008, 191p
- Les Balançoires, Edition Tropiques, Yaoundé, 2006

== Stage productions ==
- 1981: Kabeyene ou à qui la faute by Julien Mfoulou
- 1982: La Secrétaire particulière by Jean Pliya
- Amours à haut risques

== Awards ==
- 2008: Clé Editions award for Best Playwright
