= Ekema Patrick Esunge =

Cameroonian politician (2013–2019)

Ekema Patrick Esunge (September 26, 1976 – October 27, 2019) is a Cameroonian politician. He was mayor of the municipality of Buea from 2011 to 2019.

== Biography ==
Ekema Patrick Esunge was born on September 26, 1976, in Small Soppo Woteke, in the city of Buea, Southwest Region. He is the son of Esunge John Matute and Julie Mojoko Wotany. He studied at the University of Buea. He holds a Bachelor of Science in History and a master's degree in political science.

== Career ==
After having been a supplier of sand and firewood, and an officer at the Faculty of Education of the University of Buea, Ekema Patrick Esunge was elected mayor of the municipality of Buea in May 2013, a position he held until his death on October 27, 2019, in Douala.

He was buried on December 14, 2019, in Buea.

== Family life ==
- Ekema was born into a modest family in Buea.
- His parents were well-known in their community, and his upbringing in Small Soppo Woteke shaped his early worldview.
- After his death in 2019, his family endured significant grief, with reports highlighting the lingering agony and disputes surrounding his legacy.
