= Ateki Seta Caxton =

Ateki Seta Caxton is a Cameroonian politician born in 1986 in the English-speaking region of Cameroon, precisely the Northwest Region. He is the founder of the NGO Network for Solidarity, Empowerment and Transformation for All (NEWSETA) where he served as executive director till July 2025.

== Early life ==
Ateki was born in the Northwest Region of Cameroon in 1986, and grew up in an environment known for a diverse culture and language. He is a holder of a bachelor's degree in history from the University of Buea and obtained a master's degree in International Relations form the Institute of International Relations in Cameroon. He is a husband and a father of four.

== Career ==
Known for his interests in power decentralisation, Ateki founded the NEWSETA, an organisation that champions democracy, peaceful coexistence, and inclusive development across Cameroon. Under his Leadership as executive director, and through his REPAIR initiative, he has empowered over 10,000 young Cameroonians.

He also doubles as the founding member for the African Movement for Democracy. He holds the position of the vice president of the Liberal Alliance Party (PAL).

== Politics ==
Being the Vice President of the PAL, Ateki was nominated on July 12, 2025 to be the Party's presidential candidate for the October 12, 2025, presidential election, making him the first official presidential candidate of the party since its creation in 1991, though his candidacy was short term as he withdrew from the race before the end.
