= Therapy (film) =

2021 Cameroonian film - Drama

- Directed by: Anurin Nwunembom and Musing Derick
- Written by: Anurin Nwunembom<>Musing Derick<>Forkwa Babila
- Produced by: Sakah Antoine & Ermelinde Simo Jing Sakah
- Starring: Ermelinde Simo Jing Sakah; Richard Mofe Damijo; Ireti Doyle; Alenne Menget; Lucie Memba; Neba Godwill Awantu; Syndy Emade; Kayla Merits; Obasy Ndula; Ngong Yvette Ngoinjang; Nchana Basil
- Distributed by: FilmOne Entertainment
- Release date: 26 March 2021
- Running time: 81 minutes
- Country: Cameroon
- Language: English /Pidgin English

Therapy is a 2021 English-language Cameroonian film drama produced by Ermelinde Simo Jing Sakah and Sakah Antoine and directed by Anurin Nwunembom and Musing Derick It stars Ermelinde Simo Jing Sakah Richard Mofe Damijo, Iretiola Doyle, Alenne Menget, Syndy Emade, Lucie Memba, Obasy Ndula, Kayla Merits, Ngong Yvette, Nchana Basil and Neba Godwill Awantu. It was acquired and aired on Netflix on 26 March 2021, making it the first Cameroonian film to air on Netflix. The film was released in all English speaking countries on 14 July 2021.

== Synopsis ==
Therapy is the story of a dysfunctional couple that hires the services of an unconventional therapist in an effort to solve their marital troubles. The plot as a whole talks about the inability of a man to produce children in an African context. Mr. Lima is almost losing his mind over his wife's psychological pain. The methods of Dr. Benedicta lead the couple to discover truths that threaten them more.

== Cast ==
- Ermelinde Simo S. Jing is Mrs. Lima née Loveline Ngum, founder of Lima Foundation an N.G.O focused helping women in need
- Richard Mofe Damijo is Mr. Dobgima Anthony Lima, troubled human resource manager who decides to stay home and support his depressed wife.
- Ireti Doyle is Dr. Ngole Benedicta, psychotherapist with busy private practice
- Alenne Menget is Nguni Maxwell, Business man and best friends with Mr. Lima
- Lucie Memba Bos is Dora Musi. Staff of Lima foundation and widowed friend of Mrs. Lima.
- Neba Godwill Awantu is Dr. Ndive Franklin MD (Urologist)
- Syndy Emade is Mrs. Ndive Laura. Stay home house wife of Dr. Ndive
- Kayla Merits is Nabila Lima 6/7 months old Lima baby product of the situation that brings about Mrs. Lima's depression
- Mrs. Obasy Ndula is Mrs. Che Niba (Madam Delegue), Mrs. Lima's elder sister and guardian.
- Ngong Yvette Ngoinjang is the Nanny of the Lima daughter
- Nchana Basil is Dr. Benedicta's other patient.

== Production ==
The film was produced by Ermelinde Simo Jing Sakah and Sakah Antoine for SAM's Production. Netflix acquired the distribution rights on 26 March 2021.

== Release ==
On 26 March 2021, the film was available to stream on Netflix.

== See also ==
- List of Cameroonian films
