= Roseline Fonkwa =

Cameroonian movie producer and a business (born 1975)

- Born: Roseline Fonkwa- Moundjongui; 1975 (age 50–51); Cameroon
- Occupations: Producer, businesswoman
- Awards: Cameroon Career Women Awards (2015) edition in business; 2016 Saker Baptist College pride award

Roseline Fonkwa- Moundjongui (born August, 1975) is a Cameroonian movie producer and a business woman who owns 3R productions. In 2017, she was recognized for her work as a producer in the movie Breach of Trust

== History ==
Roseline Fonkwa- Moundjongui originates from Cameroon in Africa. In 2015, she won the Cameroon Career Women Awards (2015) edition in business and Saker Baptist College pride award designated for ex-students in their respective skills, Fonkwa won still in Business.

== Selected filmography ==
Breach of Trust (2017) Alongside Epule Jeffrey

== 2017 ==
- Breach of Trust featuring Epule Jeffrey

== Awards and recognition ==
| Year | Award | Category | Recipient | Result |
|---|---|---|---|---|
| 2015 | Cameroon Career Women Awards | Business | Herself | Won |
| 2016 | Saker Baptist College pride award | Business | Herself | Won |

== See also ==
- List of Cameroonian Actors
- Cinema of Cameroon
