= Adela Elad =

Cameroonian movie actress (born 1987)

- Born: 25 October 1987 (age 39); Bamenda, Northwest Region, Cameroon
- Education: University of Buea
- Occupations: Actress, film producer, philanthropist
- Years active: 2012–present
- Awards: 2015 African Achiever awards

Adela Elad (born 25 October 1987) is a Cameroonian movie actress, producer and philanthropist. She started her acting career in 2012 in the movie University Girls. She won the 2015 edition of African dream achiever award. As a producer, her works include Night in the grassfield under her production Mae Pictures. Her first international movie debut project was Baby Daddy with Nigerian Nollywood producer Emem Isong featuring stars like Alexx Ekubo.

== Early life ==
Adela Elad was born on 25 October 1987 in Bamenda, the capital of the north west region of Cameroon. She is a native of Kwen. She attended primary school in Douala, then went on to the Government Bilingual Secondary School in Santchou before graduating from high school at City College of Commerce Mankon in Bamenda. She later attended the University of Buea.

== Career ==
In 2012 Elad started acting, appearing in the movie "University girls". Since then she has been active in the cinema of Cameroon with movies such has "U-turn", "Wrong combination" and others. She has also acted in two television series "Rumble" and "Bad Angels" both broadcast on Cameroon Radio Television (CRTV). In 2016, she launched her own movie production known as Mae Pictures and has produced the movie Night of the grassfield. In 2015 she won the African dream achiever award.

== Philanthropy ==
Elad is a philanthropist with focussing on children who lack basic facilities. In 2016 she created the Mae Foundation as a medium to reach out to underprivileged children.

== Selected filmography ==
- University girl (2012)
- U-turn
- Baby daddy with Alexx Ekubo
- Bad Angel (TV series)
- Night of the grassfield

== Awards and recognition ==
Year	Award	Category	Result
2015	African Achiever awards	Cameroon	Won

== See also ==
- List of Cameroonian Actors
- Cinema of Cameroon
