= Onyama Laura =

Cameroonian actress

- Born: 14 October 1992 (age 33); Buea, Southwest Region, Cameroon
- Education: University of Buea
- Occupation: Actress
- Years active: 2011–present
- Awards: Best Cameroonian Actress - Écrans Noirs Film Festival, 2016; Best Actress - Cameroon International Film Festival, 2017

Onyama Laura (born Onyama Laura Anyeni; 14 October 1992) is a Cameroonian actress. She won Best Actress at the 2017 Cameroon International Film Festival (CAMIFF), as well as Best Cameroonian actress at the 2016 Écrans Noirs Film Festival. Laura's first role was in the 2011 film Heavy Rain, with other roles in Kiss of Death (2016), Saving Mbango (2020), and others. She is the president of the Limbe Branch of the National Actors' Guild of Cameroon (NAGCAM).

== Early life ==
She was born in Buea General Hospital, in the capital of the Southwest Region of Cameroon, on 14 October 1992. She is the daughter of Onyama Judith. She started her primary school in Buea and later moved to Yaoundé to complete her secondary school, before moving back to Buea to complete a degree in Linguistics at the University of Buea.

== Career ==
Laura developed an interest in acting in 2009 and her first acting appearance was in Heavy Rain (2011). She has appeared in over a dozen films since then, winning awards in back-to-back years for her appearances in the films Kiss of Death (2016) and Rebel Pilgrim (2017).

== Selected filmography ==
- Heavy rain by Chando Daniel (2011)
- Kiss of Death by Musing Derrick (2016)
- Rebel Pilgrim by Chinepoh Cosson (2017)
- Ward Zee by Itambi Delphine (2018)
- Church street by Nkanya Nkwai (Short film, 2019)
- Saving Mbango by Nkanya Nkwai (2020)
- The Fisherman's Diary by Enah Johnscott (2020)
- Dirt Roads by Enah Johnscott (2022)
- Stripped by Enah Johnscott (2022)
- A Cry from the Forest by Lynno Lovert (2023)

== Awards and recognition ==
Year	Award	Category	Recipient	Result
2016	Écrans Noirs Film Festival	Best Cameroonian Actress	Herself	Won
2017	Cameroon International Film Festival	Best Actress	Herself	Won

== See also ==
- List of Cameroonian Actors
- Cinema of Cameroon
