= Shadowlands =

Shadowlands may refer to:

== Books ==
- Shadowlands, a non-fiction book on a scientific theory by Robert Foot
- Shadowlands: Fear and Freedom at the Oregon Standoff, a book by Anthony McCann
- The Shadowlands, a children's fantasy novel by Emily Rodda, from Deltora Quest 2
- Shadowlands: The True Story of C. S. Lewis and Joy Davidman, a book by Brian Sibley

== Film, television, and theatre ==
- Shadowlands (1985 film), a 1985 BBC TV movie about the relationship between C. S. Lewis and Joy Davidman
  - Shadowlands (play), a stage play adapted from the 1985 TV Movie by William Nicholson about C. S. Lewis and Joy Gresham
  - Shadowlands (1993 film), a 1993 adaptation of the William Nicholson play
- "Shadowlands" (Bluey), an episode of the first season of the animated television series Bluey

== Games ==
- Shadowlands (video game), 1992 computer role playing game published by Domark
- Shadowlands, the second expansion pack for the MMORPG Anarchy Online
- World of Warcraft: Shadowlands, a 2020 expansion pack

=== Settings within games ===
- Shadowlands, south of Rokugan in the Legend of the Five Rings game setting
- Shadowlands, setting within Eternal (video game)

== Music ==
- Shadowlands (Glass Hammer album), 2004
- Shadowlands (Klaus Schulze album), 2013
- "The Shadowlands," a song by Ryan Adams on his album Love Is Hell
- "Shadowlands" album by Sheila Walsh 1986

== See also ==
- Shadowland
