= Princess Brun Njua =

Cameroonian actress and model

- Born: 26 January 1986 (age 40); Kom, Northwest Region, Cameroon
- Citizenship: Cameroonian
- Occupation: Actress

Princess Brun Njua (born 26 January 1986) is a Cameroonian actress and Model. She came to prominence back in 2014 after appearing on the popular ITV TV series Judge Rinder. She is the recipient of a BEFFTA star award which she won back in 2016.

== Early life ==
Brun Njua (also known as Brunhilda Njua) was born on 26 January 1986 in Kom, which is in the Northwest Region of Cameroon. Brun lost both parents in a motor accident at the age of 14 years and had to fend for herself.

== Personal life ==
Brun is the last of ten children.

== Career ==
At 13, Brun started acting in Church Plays. Her first television appearance was on the ITV TV series Judge Rinder.

== Filmography ==
Year	Film	Role	Notes
2014	Judge Rinder (TV Show)	Herself	
2014	For the Love of Money (Film)		with Victoria Abraham, Collins Archie-Pearce, Kande Fatoumata & Fergurson Jack.
2015	Gold Dust Ikenga (Film)	Doris	with Van Vicker, Stevie Maxwell-Smith & Malcolm Benson.
2016	Slave Dancer (Film)		Slave Dancer was written and co-produced by Brun Njua and features Tchidi Chikere.
2017	Breach of Trust (Film)	Oler Array	
2019	Switch (Film)	Tandi	Switch is a movie by talented filmmaker Olumide Fadeyibi.

== Awards and nominations ==
Year	Award	Category	Film	Result
2015	5th U.K Nollywood & VoxAfrica	Special Recognition	Gold Dust Ikenga	Won
2015	CAAUK Awards	Best Actress	Gold Dust Ikenga	Won
2016	2016 NRIDB Awards	Charity Ambassador		Won
2016	2016 BEFFTA	Star Award		Won
