= Gladys Tantoh =

Cameroonian movie producer (born 1971)

- Born: July 1971 (age 54–55); Cameroon
- Education: University of Greenwich; London Film Academy
- Occupations: Film producer, promoter, entrepreneur
- Website: www.gclassentertainment.com

Gladys Ndonyi (born July 1971 as Gladys Ndonyi Tantoh), also known as G-Class, is a Cameroonian movie entrepreneur Venture Capitalist, creative arts & Event promoter executive who is the co-founder and current president of The UK Cameroon Academy Arts Film Awards, managing director camerous food and drinks Limited, and the CEO of G-Class Entertainment.

== Early life and career ==
No information about She was born in Cameroon but relocated to the UK, where she did her tertiary education at University of Greenwich and film production at London Film Academy. Apart from entertainment, she is a health care worker.

Gladys Ndonyi is an entertainment executive. Nothing has been published about the year she started her career. She is recognized for her work to promote the cinema of Cameroon through the creation of Cameroon Film and Movie Academy Awards and G-class entertainment in 2015. In 2016, she earned two nominations for awards. One for best promoter for Africa Films UK at Afro Hollywood Awards, and one at the 20th African Film Awards.

== See also ==
- List of Cameroonians
- Cinema of Cameroon
