= Ribo ou le soleil sauvage =

1978 Canadian-Cameroonian film

- Directed by: Roger Racine CSC; Joseph-Henri Nama
- Written by: Camil Adam; Alain Goudreau
- Starring: Daniel Ndo; Suzanne Bandolo; Dieudonné Ond Ond
- Distributed by: Cinefilms; Vidéo Productions Inc.
- Release date: 1978
- Running time: 95 minutes
- Countries: Canada; Cameroon

Ribo ou le soleil sauvage is a film shot in Cameroon in 1976. A Canadian-Cameroonian co-production, it was released in both countries in 1978.

== Story ==
In the African jungle, in ancient times, Ribo-a-Irep, the daughter of Irep, is a teenager girl living in a village of gatherers. She was promised to Dik-a-Gan, the son of Gan, chief of the neighboring village of dancers, while still inside her mother's belly. While the betrothed await their upcoming marriage, Teter-a-Mum, chief of a third village, a village of warriors, wants to make Ribo his new wife, one who would finally give him a child. With the help of his guards he has Ribo kidnapped. War follows, leading to the destruction of the village of gatherers. Thanks to an alliance between the gatherers and the dancers, Ribo is saved and the marriage between Ribo and Dik-a-Gan is joyously celebrated.

== Production ==
This film was shot in Cameroon, using amateur actors. Subsequently, however, Daniel Ndo became known for a long career as a humorist thanks to his role as Uncle Otsama. Suzanne Bandolo, who played Ribo, changed her name to Suzanne Bomback when she got married, and went into politics, eventually serving as Minister for the Promotion of Women and the Family.

== Technical details ==
- Director: Roger Racine CSC and Joseph-Henri Nama
- Director of photography: Roger Racine CSC
- Cameraman: Christian Racine
- Sound engineer, audio mixing: Gilbert Ferron and Jean Tsang
- Editor: Camil Adam, Alain Goudreau
- Assistant Editor: Olivier Adam
- Production: Cinéfilms Montréal
- Distribution: Cinefilms & vidéo productions inc.
- Countries of origin: Canada and Cameroon
- Format: Techniscope 2.33
- Genre: Drama
- Duration: 95 minutes

== Cast ==
- Daniel Ndo: Teter-a-Mum
- Suzanne Bandolo : Ribo-A-Irep
- Dieudonné Ond Ond : Dik-a-Gan
- Innocent Manda : Gan
- Paul Etoundi Mama : Irep
- Valentin Elandi : Zok

== French voices ==
- Med Hondo: Teter-a-Mum
- Marie Christine Darah: Ribo-A-Irep
- Tola Koukoui: Dik-a-Gan
- Pierre Saintons: Gan
- Daniel Kamwa: Irep
