= Nkanya Nkwai =

Cameroonian actor, director, and producer

- Born: 3 July 1982 (age 43); Donga-Mantung, Cameroon
- Education: University of Yaoundé; LCC International University
- Occupation: Actor

Nkanya Nkwai (born 3 July 1982) is an English-speaking Cameroonian film actor, director and producer. He was recognized in 2014 by the Écrans Noirs in Yaoundé, Cameroon in the movie Viri as best actor, making him the first Anglophone Cameroonian to merit such an award.
He is the producer of the movie Nightfall (Tombée De La Nuit) featuring Nollywood actor Clem Ohameze and Cameroonian star Epule Jeffrey.

== Early life ==
Nkanya, was born in Dumbo-Berabe, Donga Mantung Division in Cameroon into a polygamous family. He went to Presbyterian primary School (PS) Dumbo-Berabe and Government High School (GHS) Ako, where he completed at Government Bilingual High School in Nkambe with a G.C.E Advanced Level Certificate and later on enrolled at University of Yaoundé I, a crash programme in South Africa. He moved to LCC International University in Lithuania. As a young man, he lived and grew up in Idenau a suburb of Limbe town, in Cameroon.

== Career ==
His movie debut came in 2008, in the movie Becky Diana. He left Cameroon for further studies abroad. In 2010, he performed a role in The Crucible by LCC International University in Lithuania. After his return to Cameroon, he featured in several movies that include Viri, The African Guest, Nightfall and Life Point.
