= Lucie Memba =

Cameroonian actress (born 1987)

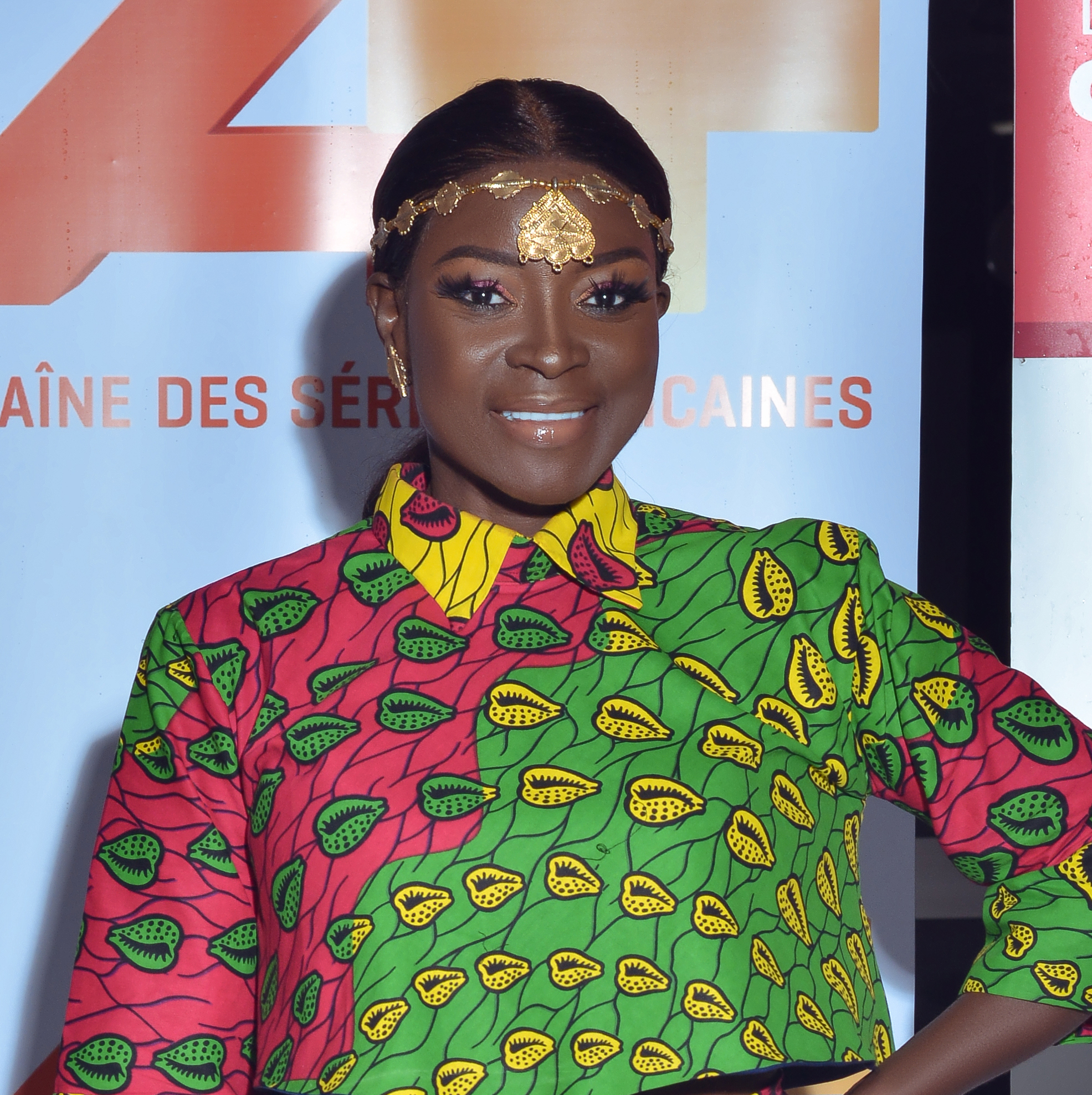
- Lucie Memba Bos in 2021
- Born: 1987 (age 38–39); Dschang, West Region, Cameroon)
- Occupations: Producer, actress
- Years active: 1999–present
- Awards: 2013: Cameroon Movies Merit Award (CMMA); 2014 Encrain Noir

Lucie Memba Bos (born 1987) is a Cameroonian actress, movie producer who have starred in both series and movies in French and English language. She was honored for best lead actress in Cinema of Cameroon for French speaking actress at Cameroon Movies Merit Award (CMMA) 2013 edition organized by Fred Keyanti. She did her International debut with Nollywood stars in the movie Pink Poison featuring Jim Iyke and Far starred alongside Nigerian Dakore Akande. In 2014 she launched L.M.B production after her name [Lucie Memba Bos].Producing the Cameroon movie Paradise, still in 2014. she co-produce La patrie d’abord, the first film of war in tribute to the Cameroonian defense forces under her production. In September, 2017 she was nominated as best Cameroonian female actor for le TROPHEES FRANCOPHONES DU CINEMA in the film La Patrie D'abord.

== Early life ==
Lucie was born in Dschang West Region (Cameroon) and grew up in Bafoussam where she started modeling and diverted into acting. After her degree in Baccalauréat philosophique, she moved to Douala for other opportunities. No information about her real date of birth has been published, some sources says; she was born in 1987.

== Career ==
Lucie first appeared in "Témoin à Seduire" in 1999 when Cinema of Cameroon was still developing.
She became prominent in 2008 and won the Cameroon Movies Merit Award (CMMA) as best actress in French speaking in 2013, she launched her own production Lucie Memba Bos (LMB). She is the producer of the Cameroon movie Paradise, her work was recognized as the lead and co-producer for the movie La patrie d’abord, the first film of war in tribute to the Cameroonian defense forces and still in 2014, she co-produced "Ntah Napi" which won the Écrans Noirs award in 2014 for best French movie She is one of those good-luck Cameroonian actors whose work has been recognized by the ministry of culture, she was among the casts to meet with minister Ama Tutu Muna who visited casts on set in the movie Pink Poison in Buea, 2013.
In 2016, she was recognized as the most Glamorous Actress by a Cameroonian celeb website Le Film Camerounais Lucie, is also recognized for the movie Fast Life with French actor Thomas Nguijol. She is also working with (Tribe Africa Media) to support and show love for Albinism in Cameroon as commemoration of World Albino's day celebration

In September 2017, Lucie took a lead role in a new movie coming up with Nigerian movie star Zack Orji in an interview by Dcoded TV, to know how she feels to work with Zack Orji, she says

I am overwhelmed with all of this. Its like a dream come true for me and Zack Orji is someone i respect and i have watched his movies over many years… To work with him on a film is just amazing. I can’t wait,”

Apart from her career in movie, in 2008 she was employed to work with Guinness Cameroon as a marketing agent

== Personal life ==
In September 2017, Lucie met with Cameroonian football legend Samuel Eto'o in Douala

== Selected filmography ==
=== 2011 – 2020 ===
- Chart of God
- Deiting the sixth
- Ntah napi 1 de Ousmane Stéphane et Sergio Marcello
- W.a.k.a
- First country
- La maladie
- Mission secrete
- Far With Dakore Akande
- Pink Poison with Jim Iyke
- Le Blanc D’Eyanga 2 with Thierry Ntamack
- La Partrie D’abord
- Fast Life

=== 2009 ===
- Sweet home de Ghislain Amougou
- Passion.Com de Serge Kendjo

=== 2008 ===
- Série Paradis d' Ousmane Stéphane
- Série Le Monde De Loïc, De Raphaël Matouke
- Virus Squad

== Awards and recognition ==
Year	Award	Category	Recipient	Result
2017	TROPHEES FRANCOPHONES DU CINEMA	Best Actress	Herself	Nominated
2013	Cameroon Movies Merit Award (CMMA)	Best Actress	Herself	Won
2014	Encrain Noir	Best French Film	Her work	Won

== See also ==
- List of Cameroonian Actors
- Cinema of Cameroon
