= Clando =

- Directed by: Jean-Marie Teno
- Written by: Jean Marie Teno
- Produced by: Jean Marie Teno
- Starring: Paulin Fodouop
- Cinematography: Nurith Aviv
- Edited by: Aurelie Ricard
- Distributed by: Les Films Du Raphia; ZDF - Zweites Deutsches Fernsehen
- Release date: 1996
- Running time: 98 minutes
- Country: Cameroon
- Language: French

Clando is a 1996 drama film from Cameroon directed by Jean-Marie Teno. Initially set in Douala, the film explores the experiences of Anatole Sobgui (played by Paulin Fodouop), a man who loses his job as a computer programmer and begins working as an unlicensed cab driver (or 'clando'). He is arrested and tortured by a corrupt regime for printing anti-government leaflets. Left sexually and psychologically impotent by the experience, his life begins to deteriorate rapidly. He migrates to Cologne to find his former employer's son, Chamba. Here, he falls in love with a local, political activist named Irene, who convinces him to return home to Cameroon.

Clando was Teno's first feature-length film. It addresses issues around migration and political violence in Cameroon, and sharply criticizes the authoritarian leadership.

== Cast ==
- Anatole Sobgui - Paulin Fodouop
- Madeleine Sobgui - Henriette Fenda
- Irene - Caroline Redl
- Chamba Rigobert - Joseph Momo
- Tchobe - Guillaume Nana

== See also ==
Clando at IMDb
