= Our Daughter =

1981 film

- Directed by: Daniel Kamwa
- Written by: Guillaume Oyono-Mbia; Daniel Kamwa
- Starring: Daniel Kamwa
- Release date: July 1981
- Running time: 90 minutes
- Country: Cameroon
- Language: French

Our Daughter (French: Notre fille) is a 1981 Cameroonian drama film directed by Daniel Kamwa. It was entered into the 12th Moscow International Film Festival. The film was also selected as the Cameroonian entry for the Best Foreign Language Film at the 53rd Academy Awards, but was not accepted as a nominee.

== Cast ==
- Nicole Okala as Colette - l'amie snob de Charlotte
- Daniel Kamwa as André
- Stanislas Awona as Mbarga - le père qui vient d'épouser sa huitième femme
- Elise Atangana as Mme Mbarga
- Berthe Mbia as Charlotte Mbarga - une jeune fonctionnaire moderne
- Florence Niasse as Maria
- Lucien Mamba as Le domestique
- Francis Messi
- Berthe Ebe Evina as Martha

== See also ==
- List of submissions to the 53rd Academy Awards for Best Foreign Language Film
- List of Cameroonian submissions for the Academy Award for Best Foreign Language Film
