= Shadowland =

Shadowland may refer to:

== Music ==
- Shadowland (band), an early-1990s British progressive rock band
- Shadowland (k.d. lang album), 1988
- Shadowland (Dark Moor album), 1999
- Shadowland (Nocturnal Rites album), 2002
- "Shadowland" (song), a 1997 song from the Lion King musical
- "Shadowland", song by Casey Stratton
- "Shadowland", song by Jim Kerr from Lostboy! AKA Jim Kerr
- "Shadowland", song by Steve Earle from his 2002 album Jerusalem
- "Shadowland", 2003 song by Australian band Youth Group

== Literature ==
- Shadowland (Cabot novel), 2000 young adult novel by Meg Cabot (as Jenny Carroll)
- Shadowland (Straub novel), 1980 horror novel by Peter Straub
- Shadowland (Arnold novel), 1978 biographical novel by William Arnold
- Shadowland, 2009 novel by Alyson Noël, from her Immortals series
- Shadowland, 2009 novel by Chitra Banerjee Divakaruni
- Shadowland, 2005 lesbian novel by Radclyffe
- Shadowland, alternative name of Mordor, a place in J. R. R. Tolkien's novel The Lord of the Rings

== Video games ==
- Shadowland, a localized title for the game Yokai Dochuki
- Shadowland, another name given for the criminal organization Shadaloo, run by video game character M. Bison

== Other ==
- Shadowland (comics), a 2010 Marvel Comics limited series featuring Daredevil
- Shadowland (film), a 2024 Finnish documentary film
- Shadowland (magazine), a 1919-1923 magazine dedicated to art, dance, and film
- Shadowland Theatre, a community arts theatre and collective of visual and theatre artists on Toronto Island
- Shadowland, a variety show by dance theatre Pilobolus
- Shadowland (miniseries), a limited series on Peacock, exploring known conspiracy theories that threaten the United States

== See also ==
- Shadowlands
