= Alenne Menget =

Cameroonian actor (born 1975)

- Born: 1975 (age 50–51)
- Citizenship: Cameroon
- Education: University of Buea, World Bank Institute
- Occupations: Actor, documentary filmmaker, and narrator

Alenne Menget (born 1975) is a Cameroonian actor, documentary filmmaker, and narrator. He was recognized as "Best African Actor" by the organizers of the Golden Academic Awards in Ghana. Menget has appeared in several well-known Cameroonian films, including Nganu, released in 2023.

== Early life ==
Alenne Menget was born in Bamenda, Cameroon, in 1975. He began his education at GS Atuakom, where he earned his First School Leaving Certificate. He went on to attend PSS Mankon, and later GBHS Bamenda, obtaining his Ordinary Level Certificate. He completed his Advanced Level studies at PHS Batibo. Menget pursued a degree in history at the University of Buea and later studied investigative journalism at the World Bank Institute in New York. later in the year 2023, the award winning Cameroonian actor Alenne has been crowned Ni Ngamfon a respectable traditional title in Nyen-Muyah a Fondom in Batibo.

== Career ==
Menget started his filmmaking career in 2008, two years after his acting debut in 2006, where he featured in several movies like Sacrament, Murder in the Police Station, Viral Ad, and Pink Poison Re-loaded. Having directed movies such as The Semetery, Living on Water, Come Rain Come shine, Clando, The Cameroon Mountain, and Web City, Kalabout in his earlier years, he has been a great actor, featuring in key Cameroonian movies like Smokescreen in 2016, Broken, and Assailed and Nganu in 2023.

He has received various awards, including Best African Actor in Golden Movies Award in Ghana in 2018, Best African Actor in CANNES, Dikalo Awards in France in 2019 and Best Nollywood actor in London in 2019 and a Cameroon Heroes Medal of Valor.

Away from being a movie producer and actor, he is a Chef, an instrumentalist playing diverse instruments, and a father of many children.

== Filmography ==
- Sacrament
- Murder in the Police Station
- Viral ad
- Pink Poison Re-loaded
- Smokescreen (2016)
- Broken (2019)
- Assailed
- Nganù (2023)
