= Alphonse Beni =

Cameroonian actor and film director (1946–2023)

Alphonse Béni
- Born: 1946; Nkongsamba, French Cameroon
- Died: 12 March 2023 (aged 77)
- Occupations: Actor, director
- Years active: 1973–2023
- Spouse: Suzanne Béni

Alphonse Béni (1946 – 12 March 2023) was a Cameroonian actor and movie director. He made several films in Cameroon, acted in French erotic comedies and played a ninja in Godfrey Ho's "ninja" flicks Black Ninja. He was credited as Alfons Bény and Chris Kelly in some films.

== Death ==
Béni died on 12 March 2023, at the age of 71.
