= François Bingono Bingono =

Cameroonian journalist and writer

- Born: 1959 (age 66–67); Njantom, South Cameroon
- Occupations: Journalist, writer, anthropologist, actor, director

François Bingono Bingono is a Cameroonian journalist, writer, anthropologist, actor, and director.

== Biography ==
François Bingono Bingono was born in 1959 in Njantom, in the South of Cameroon. He pursued studies in modern literature and theatrical arts. He teaches at the École supérieure des sciences et techniques de l'information et de communication de Yaoundé (ESSTIC) and is a researcher on the epistemology of African cryptocommunication and a playwright with the Alabado theater troupe.

In 2009 he published Evu sorcier with Éditions L'Harmattan. In 2020, he wrote two plays, Mafin et Tafin and Sidamour tue, a novel Ekeké, and an anthropological essay Ma bôm nkul, j'apprends à jouer du tambour d'appel, all published by Éditions de Midi. He contributed to the preface of William Omer's book Le Cahier des éloges, lettres et illuminations published by L'Harmattan in 2015 and Antoine-Beauvard Zanga's Les hommes de la nuit in 2017. He appeared in the documentary film Mvé-dzié by Roger Nankap in 2014.

As a national expert in intangible cultural heritage, he participated in the 2015, 2017, and 2019 sessions of the Intergovernmental Committee for the Safeguarding of the Intangible Cultural Heritage supported by UNESCO.

== Publications ==
=== Novels ===
- Bingono Bingono, François (2020). Ekeké (in French). Yaoundé: Éditions de Midi. ISBN 9789956636372. OCLC 1246253614.

=== Essays ===
- Bingono Bingono, François (2020). Ma bôm nkul, j'apprends à jouer du tambour d'appel. Yaoundé: Éditions de Midi.

=== Plays ===
- Bingono Bingono, François (2020). Mafin et Tafin, suivi de, Sidamour tue : théâtre. Yaoundé: Éditions de Midi. ISBN 9789956636549. OCLC 1258042764. – includes Mafin et Tafin and Sidamour tue

=== Collaborations ===
- Omer, William (2015). Le cahier des éloges, lettres et illuminations. Preface by François Bingono Bingono. Paris: L'Harmattan. ISBN 9782343080291. OCLC 936068800.
- Zanga, Antoine-Beauvard (2017). Les hommes de la nuit. Preface by François Bingono Bingono. L'Harmattan. ISBN 9782343121116. OCLC 990410482.
