= Daniel Kamwa =

- Born: 14 April 1943 (age 83); Nkongsamba, Cameroon
- Occupations: Film director, actor
- Years active: 1970–present

Daniel Kamwa (born 14 April 1943) is a filmmaker and actor from Nkongsamba, Cameroon. He studied drama in Paris, France, before producing his first film, Boubou-cravate, in 1973. His 1981 film Our Daughter was entered into the 12th Moscow International Film Festival.

== Filmography as director ==
- Boubou-cravate, director (1973)
- Pousse-Pousse, director (1976)
- Notre Fille, director (1980)
- Vidéolire, director (1991)
- Totor, actor and director (1994)
- Le Cercle des pouvoirs, director (1998)
