= Vitalis Otia Suh =

Cameroonian actor, director, and producer (1966/1967–2024)

- Born: 1966/1967; Tole, Cameroon
- Died: 9 June 2024 (aged 77); Yaoundé, Cameroon
- Occupations: Actor, producer
- Years active: 2006–2024

Otia Vitalis Suh (1966/1967 – 9 June 2024) was a Cameroonian film actor, director and producer. He featured in over 50 films and three television series.

== Early life ==
Otia Vitalis Suh was born and raised in Tole in the Southwest Region of Cameroon. He was a native of Modelle in Menchum Division, North West Region. He grew up on a CDC plantation. He attended the Bishop Rogan College in Buea. After his studies, he worked with the Medical Service of the HEVECAM Agro-Industrial complex in Kribi. He later left Kribi and went to Nigeria for training. After his training, he returned to Cameroon in 2004.

== Career ==
Otia Vitalis Suh began his career in 2004 when he moved to Yaounde. He debuted with Facing Destiny, a TV Series of 17 episodes for CRTV directed by Josephine Mangfu Talla. 2016 he played in the award-winning movie A Good Time to Divorce. In 2016, he equally featured in the TV series Samba by Enah Johnscott. In 2019, he was nominated at the Canal 2'Or awards in the category of Best Comedian for his role as Mindako in Bad Angels.

Suh was the co-founder of the Cameroon Film Industry. In 2013, he was elected as board chair of the Cameroon Film Industry. He was the founder and President of the Red Feather Awards, an annual cultural event that recognizes and celebrates achievements in the entertainment industry since 2016.

Besides his career in the film industry, Suh worked as a senior biomedical scientist at the Biotechnology Center of the University of Yaounde I.

== Death ==
Sun died in Yaoundé on 9 June 2024, at the age of 57.

== Selected filmography ==
=== 2024 ===
- The Chiseler

=== 2022 ===
- Dzemakou: Lords of the Forest
- Love Trap

=== 2020 ===
- 4th Generation
- Saving Mbango

=== 2019 ===
- Otage d'amour
- Broken
- Petit Jo, enfant des rues

=== 2018 ===
- Defying the 6th
- A Good time to divorce

=== 2016 ===
- Samba
