= Agbor Gilbert Ebot =

Cameroonian film producer

- Born: Tiko, Cameroon
- Occupation: Film director

Agbor Gilbert Ebot is a Cameroonian film producer.

== Early life and education ==
Agbor Gilbert Ebot was born to Cameroonian and Nigerian parents. His father is a Cameroonian from Mamfe in Manyu Division while his mother came from Cross River state in Nigeria.

He studied engineering at the Government Technical High School (GTHS) in Mamfe where he studies engineering. He did not attend any technical school for film.

== Career ==
In 2003, he met Jeta Amata, Fred Amata, Olu Jacobs and Rita Dominic in Calabar while they were shooting a movie. He often visited the location as he was always sent out of class on account of not having the right textbooks or tools. Each time he returned to the location, he would sit there and help as a production assistant on the set, and that is how his interest in film grew.

Agbor Gilbert is one of the founding members and Public Relations Officer of Cameroon Film Industry and also the founder and president of the Cameroon Film Festival( CAMIFF).

== Filmography ==
- Pink Poison (2012)
- The Blues Kingdom (2007)
- The Land of shadow (2014)
- Far (2014 film)

== See also ==
- List of Cameroonian Actors
- Cinema of Cameroon
