= Cinema of Cameroon =

The cinema of Cameroon includes French and English-language filmmaking. The Anglophone film industry is sometimes known as Collywood.

== History ==
In 1919, the movie Haut-Commissariat de la République française au Cameroun was shot in the French Cameroons.

In 1960, Cameroon became an independent country, and the history of Cameroonian cinema started around 1962.

Thérèse Sita Bella and Jean Pierre Dikonguè Pipa were the first Cameroonian movie producers. Other names in early Cameroonian cinema included Alphonse Béni who had studied Film technique at the Conservatoire libre du cinéma français (CLCF), and Daniel Kamwa, who studied film at the Université Paris 8 Vincennes-Saint-Denis. The first movie shot in Cameroon after the independence was Point de Vue No. 1, directed by Dia Moukouri, and released in 1966.

Before 1973, approximately 15 short and long films were produced, with financial support from the French Ministry of Cooperation, and technical support from the French Cultural Centers (CCF – centres culturels français). In 1972, there were about 32 movie theaters across Cameroon by Film Industry Development Fund (FODIC – Fonds du développement de l’industrie cinématographique) sponsored by the Government of Cameroon at the time.

In the 1970s and 1980s, a number of films were produced in Cameroon, including Muna Moto by Jean-Pierre Dikonguè, which was awarded the top prize, the Golden Stallion (Étalon d'or de Yennenga), at the Panafrican Film and Television Festival of Ouagadougou (FESPACO) in 1976.

In the 1980s there were several cinemas in Yaounde and Douala. They subsequently shut down, and movies were instead shown at mobile cinemas.

In a 2015 interview, Otia Vitalis, then the Chair of the Cameroon Film Industry Board, listed Ninah's Dowry (2012) by director Victor Viyouh and produced in Sabga Hills, Bamenda as a more recent notable film. It won several awards including Best Feature at the African Movie Academy Awards in 2013. Vitalis also referenced Beleh (2013), a short comedy by Christa Eka, which screened in over 20 international film festivals.

The Cameroon International Film Festival (CAMIFF) was first held in 2016, established by producer Agbor Gilbert Ebot.

== Cameroon Film Industry (CFI) ==
The history of Cameroon filmmaking dates back to 1962, two years after independence when motion picture production was film-based and very expensive, during which independent French filmmakers like Jean Paul Ngassa, Dikonge Pipa, Sita Bella, Alphonse Benny and others with actors like Gérard Essomba who formed the first generation of filmmakers in Cameroon made remarkable strides in the national and international milieu to revive the seventh art while shooting on the very expensive and scarce film technology at that time. This was closely followed by a second generation of filmmakers such as Jean Marie Tenu, Daniel Kamwa's pouss pouss and Dikongue Pipa's Muna Moto feature films in 1972/1975 respectively stepped up the level of the local industry at the time with national and international recognition. Jean père Bikolo, Baseck Bakobio and a few others are the last generation of filmmakers who shot on the analog film technology and are still engaging in film productions but this time with the modern digital video equipment which brought a major transformation in the early 1990s in Africa. This generation which overlaps into the digital film age is still impacting the film industry through their individual efforts to be recognized in the industry at home and abroad.

Following the continuous strides for evolution and the quest of local filmmakers to propagate the film making art with the coming of Cameroon television (CTV) in 1985, inspired new filmmakers including English filmmakers who, through Victor Pungong in 1987, produced "Trials of passion", the first English film aired on national television with its second version (series) in 2004 starring veterans including Claude Henry Ndenge, Chinepoh Corson, Yijika Solange, Yimbu Emmanuel, Njoya Grace, Chi Anthony, Tita Ernestine, Tarh Paddy King... most of whom got their entrance into the mainstream industry then.

Eleven years later, after many passionate filmmakers of English expression like Nfuh ebenezer, Njiforti Victor, and Thomas Belton continue to push ahead this film making passion. The influence of the Nigerian film industry in the mid-1990s also contributed greatly in the building process of the 7th arts in the west of the mungo through major co-productions initiated by local film producers with Nollywood with main intention to stimulate the local productions and give the local film industry steam. Within this period local film producer/director Thomas Beltin produced and directed Heavens forbid (2000), switching heart (2002), Mission to Damunza (2003) which also starred local daring actors at the time like Moma Pascal (Bob), Fanny Fungong, Mbuta Sylvie, Chatoh Collins, and Lyno Lovet.

Akonte Cyril of Splash network initiated the first-ever major Cameroon-Nigerian film project, Peace Offering, which they produced and was directed by Amayo Phillips, starring Nollywood/Cameroonian actors like Patience Ozukwo, Fabien Adibe Nonso Diobi, Tangie suh Nfor, Menye Patra, Cy Wanki and the list goes on. Inspired by this movie other passionate film enthusiast like Agbor Gilbert Ebot and Felix Alote initiated another Cameroon/Nigerian co production same year this time with another Nigerian born producer/director Oscar Benson in the movie titled The return of Mbombo which featured Vugar Samson, Nsuh George, Ngeh Gerald, Agbor Gilbert, with Nguffo Serge N. as associate producer. Ghis movie ended in a fiasco with numerous setbacks encountered in the process; their awful experiences pushed them to brainstorm on their way back of the creation of an ‘organ’ which could handle basic issues about actors rights and wellbeing realised a year later in 2004 today known as the National Actors Guild of Cameroon with its founding president Vugar Samson. Within this period, other local productions were also springing up in the southwest region before the big blast of Agbor Gilbert Ebot in 2005 with his maiden Cameroon/Nigerian co-production titled Before the Sunrise which he produced and was directed by Fred Amata starring ‘Giant’ Nollywood actors like Clarion Chukwura, Olu Jacobs, Dakore and featuring local actors at the time like Ivanne Namme, Quinta Eyoung Ashu, Agbor Magdalene, Jean Père Esome and Lyno lovet.

In 2006, Joe Walkie of the Joe Walkie Foundation in Kumba also produced Sacrament, starring local actors at the time such as Alene Menget (recently decorated with the medal of the knight of the order of valour by the head of state alongside Quinta Eyong Ashu) and directed by a Nigerian Director since the industry did not have a local director whose work could convince local producers at the time to entrust such a huge responsibility.

These early efforts stimulated the local industry. At the Buea meeting of 2008, through respective conventions and assemblies from Kumba, Bamenda, Yaounde where the name Collywood was adopted and finally in Buea on 3 June 2008 when the Cameroon Film Industry Collywood was initiated. The Anglophone film industry became known as Collywood. At the same time came the dissolution of NAGCAM (National Actors Guild of Cameroon) which was the only recognised structure created in 2004 to protect the stakeholders which were mostly actors to come up with a single unanimous guild. There was solid resistance at the Bamenda convention in 2007 from the founding president Vugar Samsom who was alarmed that NAGCAM was a syndicate and not an association and can not be dissolved rather other existing bodies should be incorporated into it.

A caretaker committee was set up in Kumba in November of that same year and Waa Nkeng Musi was commissioned to organise and set up the six identified guilds which included the Actors Guild, Producers Guild, Directors Guild, Technician Guild, Writers Guild and Marketing and Distribution Guild. He was commissioned alongside zonal coordinators in various identified zones like Bamenda, Kumba, Buea and Yaounde to identify and group registered members within these guilds within a three years lapse. It is important to also note that Moma Pascal Gamih founded CAMAG and incorporated actors into the actors Guild of CFI as part of the objective given to the Musi-led government in the Kumba convention. This later became a point of contention within the industry which split the actors into the NAGCAM/ CAMAG divide with NAGCAM proving itself as a syndicate with legalized documents which can't be subdued by another organ thus in August 2014 in a dual extraordinary general assembly/election in the town of friendship (Limbe), NAGCAM swallowed CAMAG in a unanimous agreement between parties to be the lone organ to represent the actors guild of Cameroon under CFI moments before Moma Pascal emerged victorious as the first-ever democratically elected actors guild president of CFI in the presence of board chairman Otia Vitalis, some board members including the secretary general Alasambom Nyinchou, the communications officer Tanwie Elvis, Musing Derick and Vugar Samson the founding father of NAGCAM. This actors' union later between parties later part ways after the premature impeachment of Moma Pascal as actors guild president with huge antagonism on his part decided to withdraw CAMAG from the union till date, leaving NAGCAM as the sole organ responsible for the identification, registration and incorporation of actors into the Actors Guild of CFI. All the above events and attributes have been the elements that have molded and build every antagonistic tendencies in form of ‘’camps’’ within the industry either directly or indirectly.

The interim body of the Musi-led government whose mandate was to terminate in three years in November 2011 extended to 23 March 2013, at the central library in Yaounde when stakeholders clamoured for a change motivated by some individuals insisting about the inability of the interim bureau to meet up with its mandate. It was in the presence of Akim Macaulay the US-based CFI representative, Dr Fai Donatus and the then minister Amah Tutu Muna's representative; the director of cinema that the Musi lead interim bureau was replaced with Otia Vitalis Suh who is the first elected board-chair of the Cameroon film industry; whose mandate equally terminated prematurely at the end of his three years reign in March 2016 to give way to Mbeaoh Alex who is few months into his second term since March 2019.

Prior to the industry's evolution, there have been some filmmakers whose direct or indirect contributions has propagated the industry to where it is today, such as Godlove Neba Nyambi Jr, Ngatou Noutossi Glaradip, Molimi Cletus, Zigoto Tchaya, Angu Elisabeth, Neba Lawrence, Waa Nkeng Musi, Chinepo Corsson, Tanwie Elvis De Dadies, Alenne Menget, Ashu Egbe, Njamsi Roland, Itambi Delphine, Amandy Alfred, Akim Macaulay, Awah Oliver, Claude Henry Ndegue, Yibain Emile Chah, Anurine Nwanembom, Ngouffo Serge N., Musing Derick, Elung Brenda Shay, Chatoh Collins, Billy Bob Ndive, Nkwah Kingsly, Princess Manka, Tanko Francoise, Chi Anthony, Enah John Scott, Nkanya Nkwai, Achile Brice, Asaba Ferdinand, Musing Derick, Keka Sylvester, Nsuh George, Elvis Smart, PD Cash, Esua Julius, Nkwah Kingsly, Nwanna Goffi, Ngongan Matheu/Joe Walkie/Glory M., Aisha Innoua, Kucha, Akuro Titus, Ala Leo, Agbor steeve (Big steeve), Syndy Emade, Asah Elvis, Akuro Rapheal, Godwin Nganah, Sylvanus Awae, Takong Delvis, Enow Tanjong, Agbor Obed Agbor, Awemu Pius, Ivanne Namme, Alfred Melo.

The launching of the national artistic and cultural season relaunch dubbed RECAN 2019 was an occasion of the reorganisation of the Cameroon Film Industry to better meet with the needs of local filmmakers through a federated structure meant to facilitate cohesion to ease dissemination of information, resources, capacity building and structuring of the dying sector. This meeting was chaired by Basseck Bakobio assisted by Chop Samuel the current president of SCAAP, the director of Cinema at MINAC and the board chair of the Cameroon Film industry CFI. On the other hand, apart from the board chair Mbeaoh Alex who diagnosed the CFI chapter; Agbor Gilbert Ebot, Takum Fred, Musing Derick and Billy Bob were the voices present to articulate the CFI motion in their respective capacities within the industry.

The bi-cultural nature of the sector attests to Cameroon's multicultural potential antagonized the meeting with the Anglo-Saxon filmmakers debating contrary to the ten regional approaches of federating the sector by convincing the French filmmakers about the need for the sector to retain its bi-cultural attributes in terms of organisation, culture, language and methodology in their respective approaches of making films; insisting that a melange of both systems may not appeal to the parties. The meeting ended with a deadlock immediately a motion of equal representation was raised about those to be absorbed into a committee to continue with further deliberations to that effect by the English filmmakers. The meeting chairperson was totally against the motion of equal representation and rather opined that those to constitute the committee can come from any part of the country not necessarily on the basis of equality. The meeting saw its last minute in a fiasco with the meeting chairman affirming an impromptu call for those that will be selected into the committee to fine-tune the meeting's agenda which could not be exhausted in one sitting.

This meeting occurred during a period of disagreement among industry figures, who nonetheless demonstrated joint participation during the proceeding, which some view as a notable development for the film industry in Cameroon. Observers express expectation that industry figures reconcile their differences to assist upcoming generations, while government authorities are encouraged to support these participants in developing an industry that has experienced limited backing.

== Notable people ==
=== Producers ===
- Adela Elad
- Agbor Gilbert Ebot
- Daniel Kamwa
- Enah Johnscot
- Nkanya Nkwai
- Stephanie Tum
- Syndy Emade

=== Directors ===
- Nkanya Nkwai

=== Actors ===
- Epule Jeffrey
- Lucie Memba
- Onyama Laura
- Solange Yijika

== See also ==
- List of Cameroonian films
- Cinema of Nigeria
