= Epule Jeffrey =

Cameroonian actor (born 1983)

- Born: 6 November 1983 (age 42); Buea, Southwest Region, Cameroon
- Education: University of Yaounde II
- Occupation: Film actor
- Awards: 2012 (DECODED) Best Actor

Epule Jeffrey Ewusi (born 6 November 1983) is a Cameroonian actor known for movies such as Breach of Trust, Red Pink Poison (2013), Decoded(2013) and Royal destination featuring Tonto Dikeh and Emeka Ike. He has starred in more than 35 movies. In 2012, he was nominated and won the Cameroon Entertainment Award as best male actor and the 2012 DAMA best actor award for the movie Decoded.

== Early life ==
Epule Jeffrey Ewusi, was born in Buea Southwest Region of Cameroon. He is a Bakosian by tribe, he went to PNEU primary school in Bamenda, Bilingual Grammar School (Lycee) Molyko in Buea and obtained a decree in Public Law 2006 at the University of Yaounde II.

== Acting career ==
Jeffrey has been acting since 2012 and has been featured in over 35 movies in Cinema of Cameroon and Nollywood in Nigeria. He make an appearance in a television series called Zamba, which was aired at Cameroon Radio Television (CRTV).

== Filmography ==
- Love Trap (2022)
- Hustle (2021) as Thug
- Bushfaller (2020) as Tabi
- Saint Valentine (2019)
- Two Ways (2018)
- Breach of Trust (2017) as Paul Achang
- Tchanga & Inoma (2016) as Bosco
- Nightfall (2015) as I.P. Ngale Robert
- Woman (2015) as Leke Asong
- Troubled Kingdom (2012) as Nixon
- Whispers (2013)
- Decoded (2014)
- Royal destination

== Awards ==
Year	Nominated work	Category	Award	Result	Notes	Ref.
2012	Decoded	Best Actor	Cameroon Entertainment Awards	Won	n/a	

== See also ==
- List of Cameroonian Actors
- Cinema of Cameroon
