= University of Buea =

University in Buea, Cameroon

- Université de Buea (French)
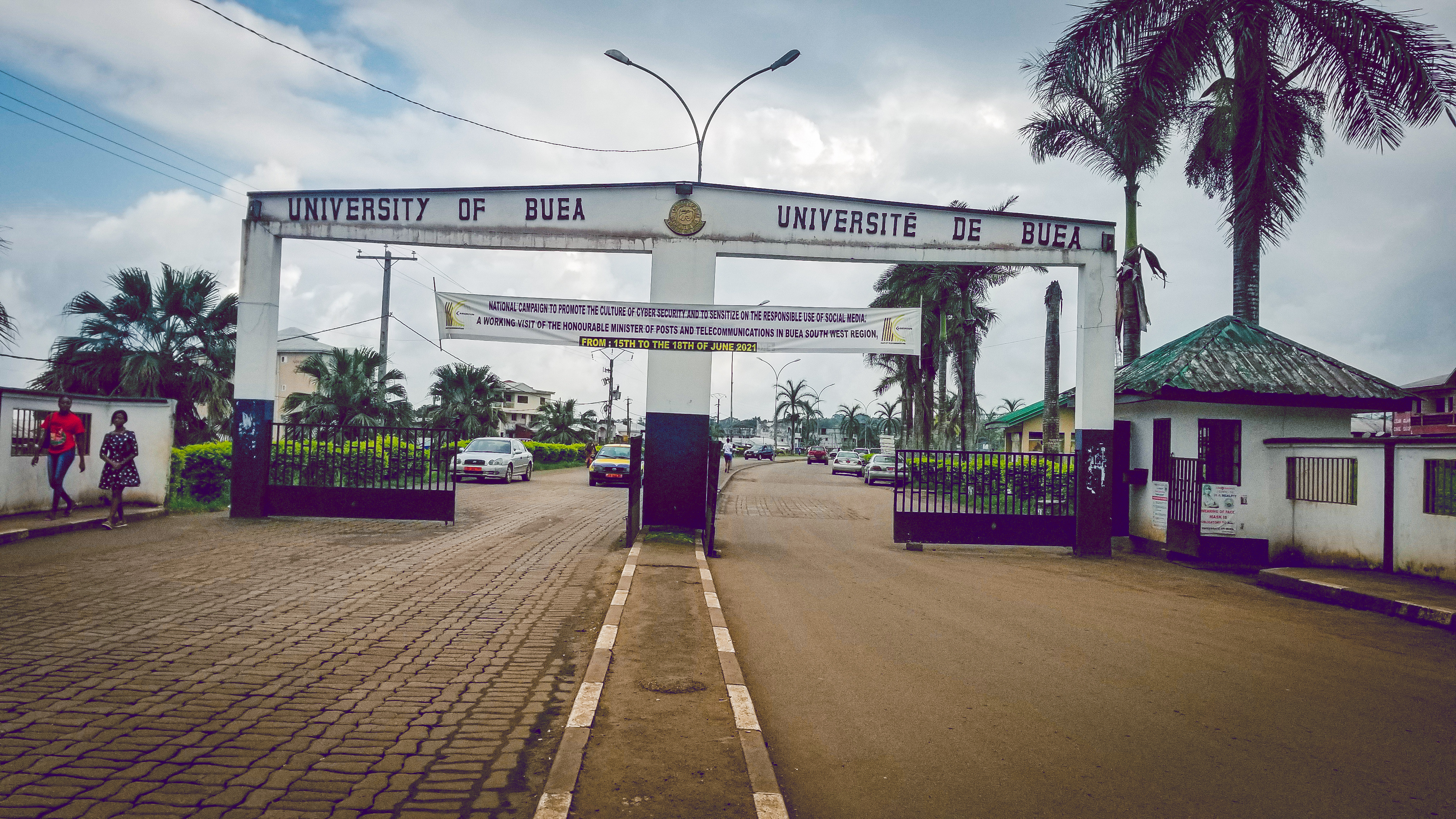
- Motto: Knowledge with Wisdom
- Type: Public
- Established: 1992; 34 years ago
- Affiliations: University of Manchester
- Chancellor: Minister of Higher Education, Cameroon
- Vice-Chancellor: Prof. Ngomo Horace Manga
- Location: Buea, Southwest Region, Cameroon; 4.1532°N 9.2923°E
- Nickname: The place to be
- Website: University website

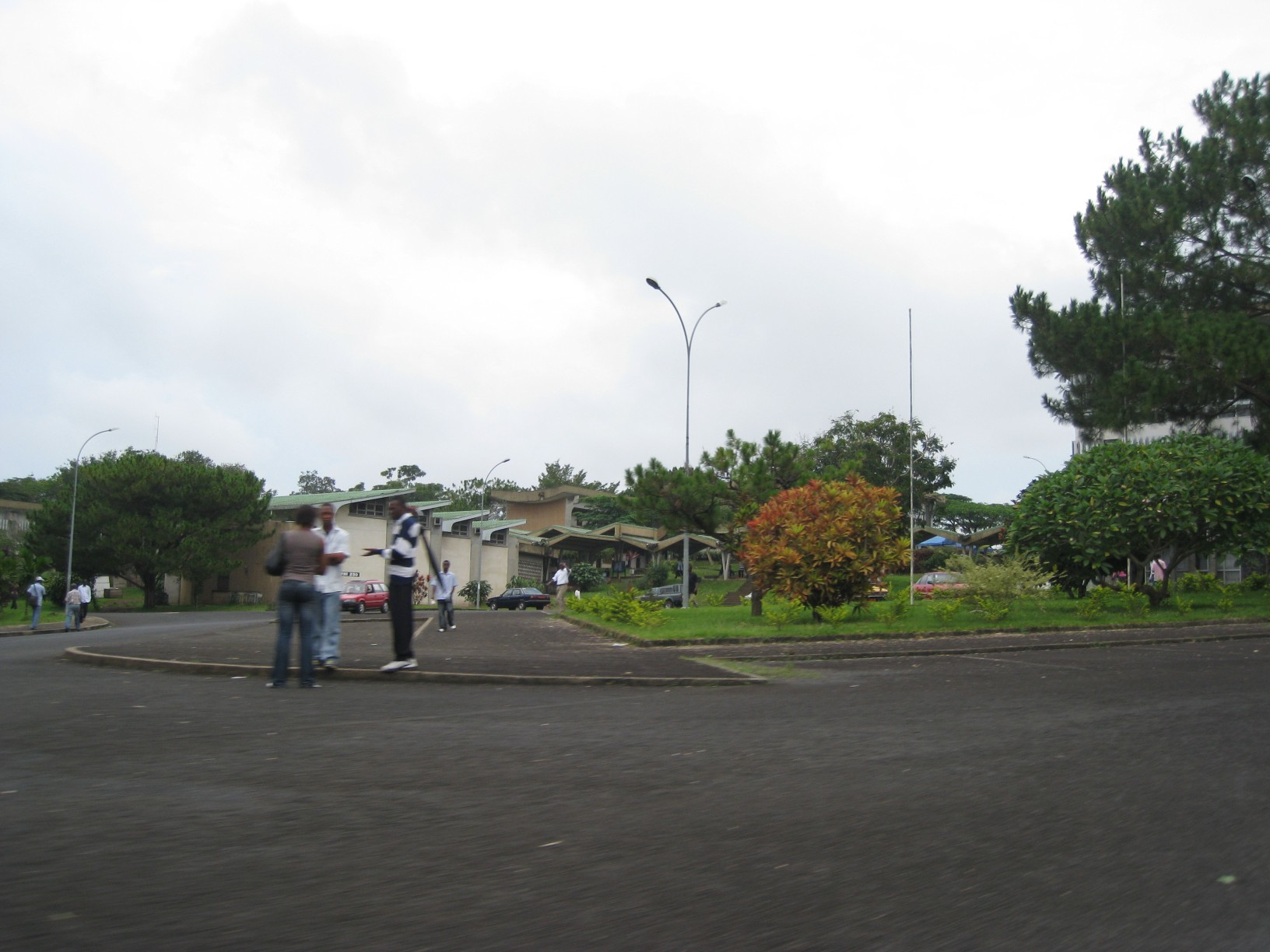
University of Buea main campus

University of Buea (UB) is found in Molyko, Buea, in the southwest region of Cameroon. It was founded as a university centre in 1985 and became a full-fledged university in 1992, following a government decree that re-organized state universities in the country. It is regarded as the best university in Cameroon and is one of two English speaking universities in Cameroon, alongside the University of Bamenda, which follow the British system of education. It serves citizens from both anglophone and francophone regions of Cameroon and from neighboring countries such as Nigeria and Equatorial Guinea.

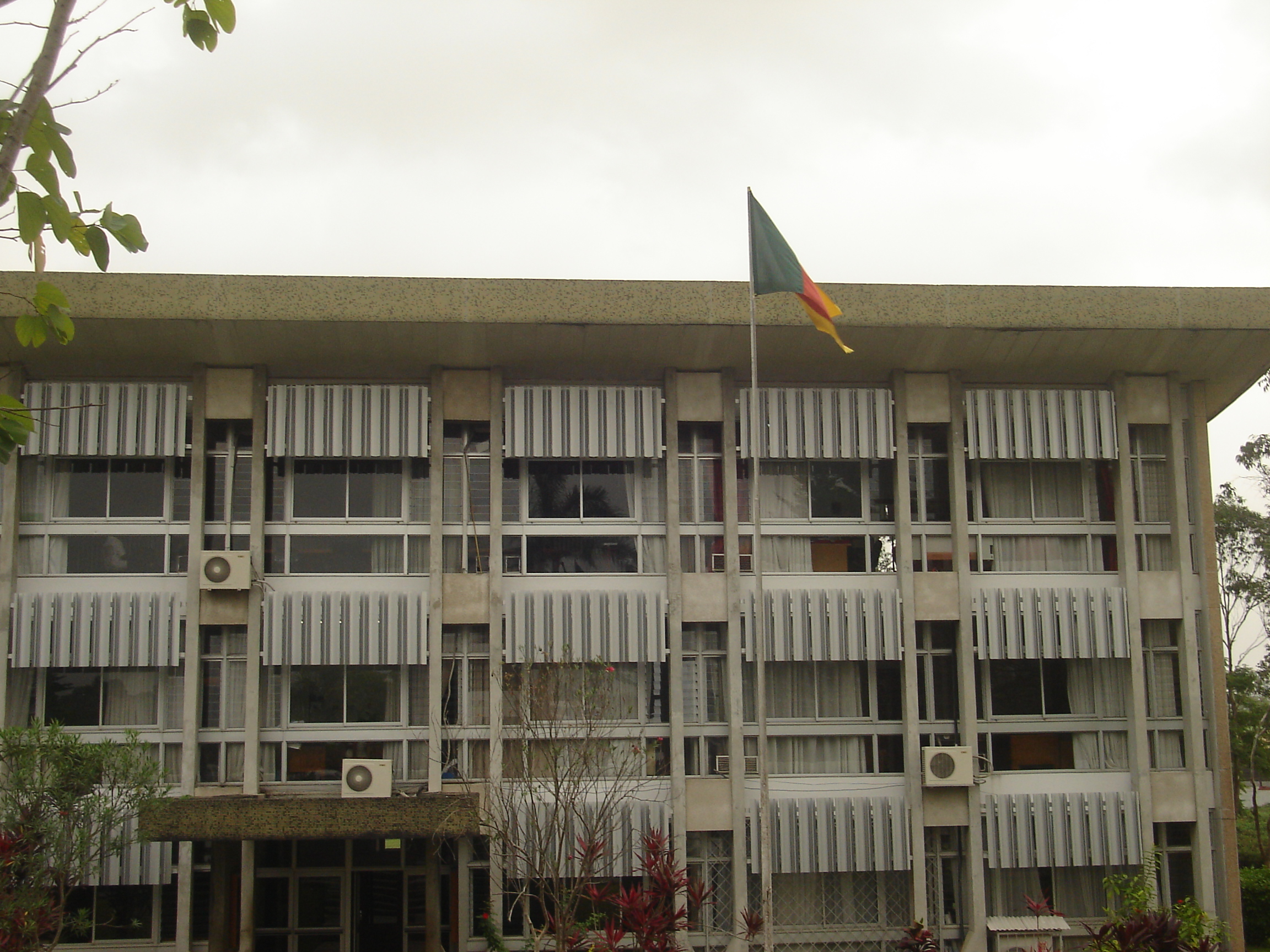
Central Building

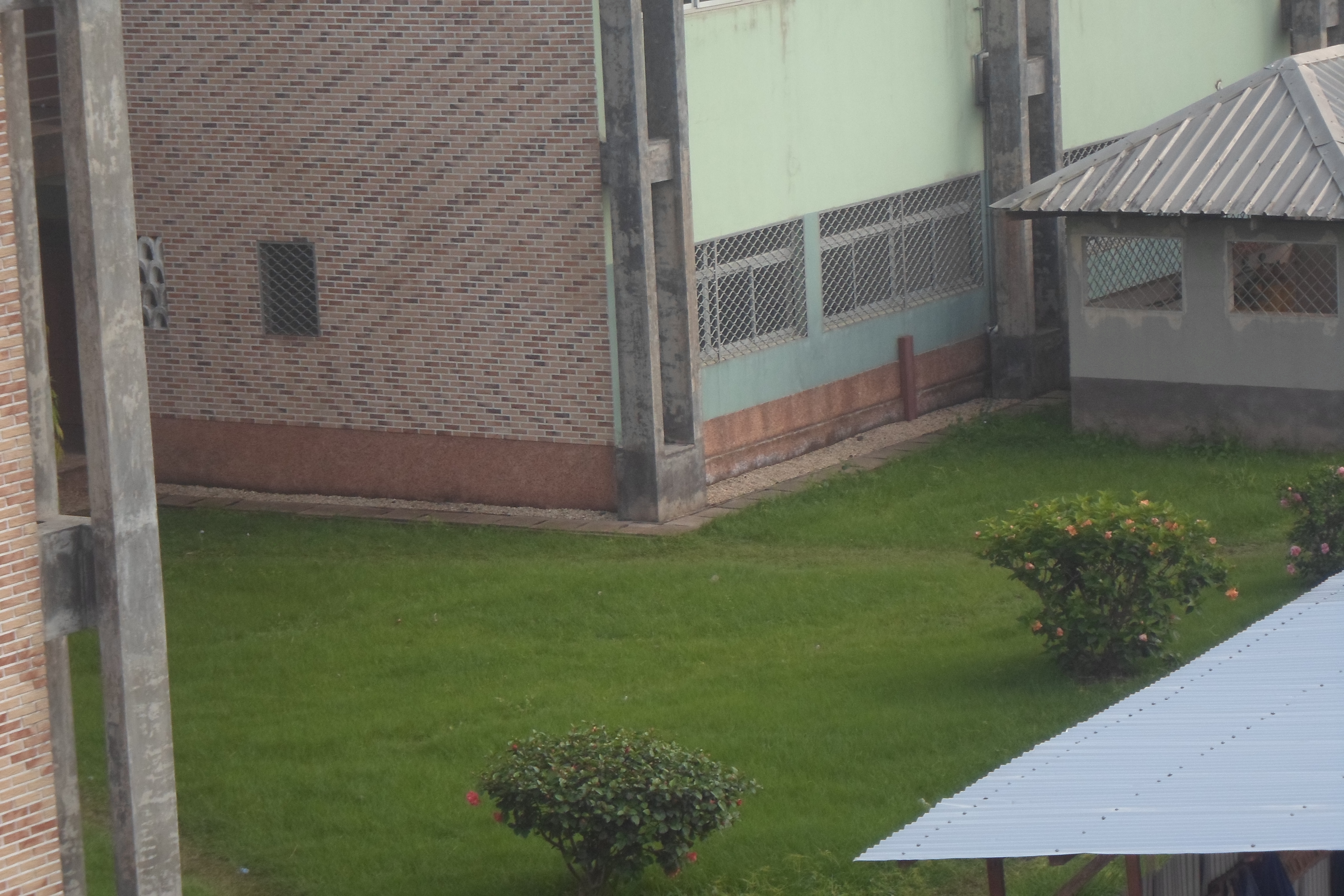
University of Buea Cameroon 02

== Location ==
UB is in the historic town of Buea, former capital of German Kamerun, former capital of British Cameroon, former capital of the federated State of West Cameroon, and now the regional capital of the Southwest Region of Cameroon. Although the university draws its students mainly from the English-speaking part of Cameroon, it also serves the other regions of the country.

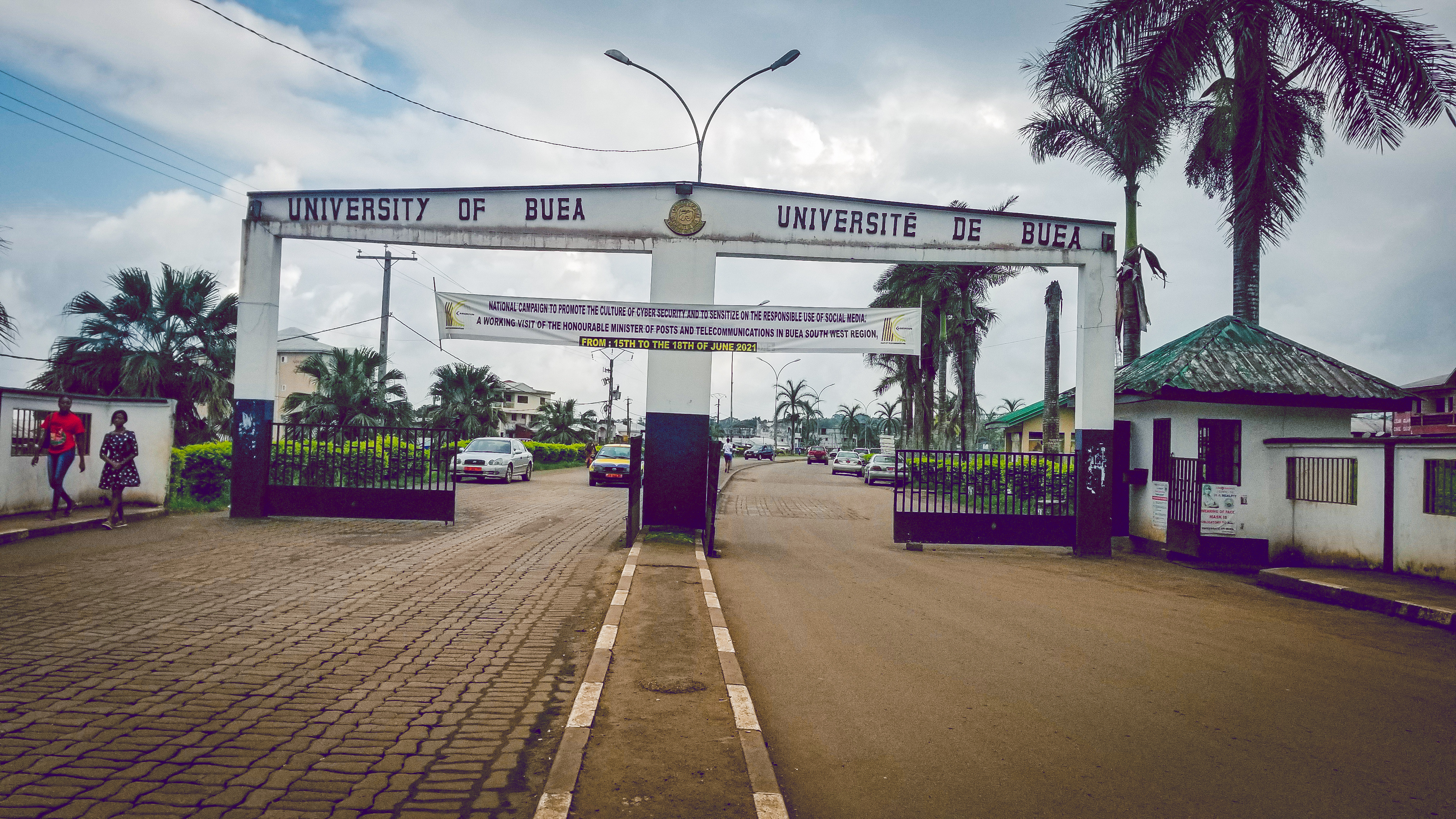
UB Junction

== Admissions ==
Admission into the university is not competitive.

== Student body and staff ==
The student population is over 33,000, including 50 who are physically and visually disabled. There are 650 permanent and 200 part-time teaching staff.

== Faculties and schools ==
The University of Buea is organized into several faculties, offering undergraduate and graduate programs in various fields of study. The university also has a School of Postgraduate Studies, which offers advanced degrees in various disciplines.

The faculties include:

- Faculty of Engineering and Technology (FET)
- Faculty of Arts
- Faculty of Education
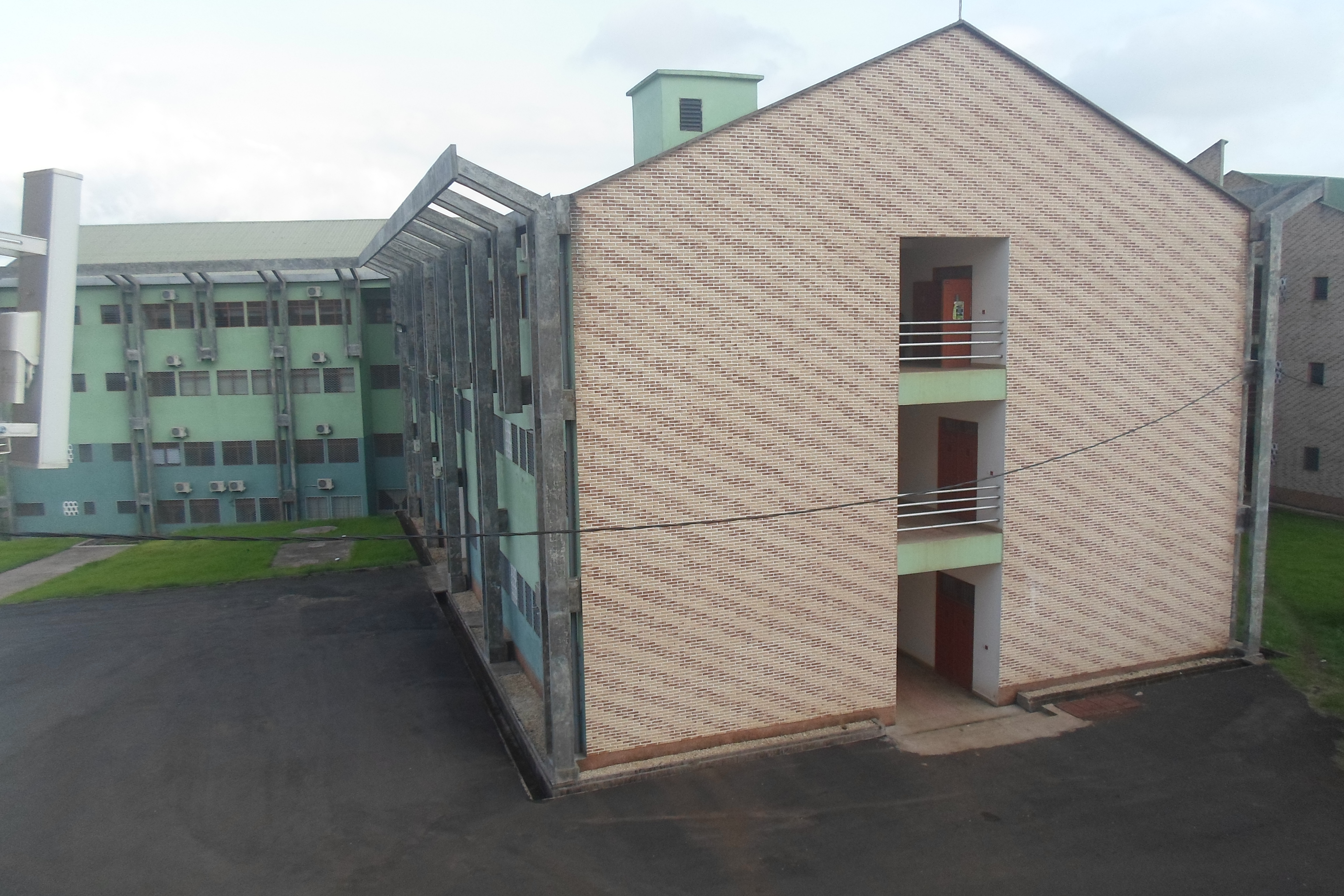
- A partial view of the Faculty of Health Sciences
  Faculty of Health Sciences
- Faculty of Science
- Faculty of Social and Management Sciences
- Faculty of Agriculture and Veterinary Medicine
- Faculty of Laws and Political Science

UB has four schools or colleges:

- Advanced School of Translators and Interpreters
- College of Technology (COT)
- Higher Technical Teachers Training College (in Kumba)
- The Higher Teachers Training College of the University of Buea

In addition to its academic programs, UB fosters research and innovation through numerous research centers and institutes.

== Research ==
The University of Buea is engaged in diverse research activities and capacity-building projects. One notable research activity is the “Integrating waste-to-resource and renewable energy technologies in resource protection for sustainable development” project. This project, led by Dr. Nkwatoh Athanasius Fuashi Albrecht, is funded by the German Ministry of Education and Research through the University of Technology, Cottbus, Germany. The project aims to integrate waste-to-resource and renewable energy technologies in resource protection for sustainable development.

Another research activity is using geospatial tools to investigate how deforestation affects malaria transmission in birds. This project is led by Dr. Anong Nota and is funded by the National Academy of Sciences. The study aims to understand how deforestation affects malaria transmission in birds.

The university also has research activities in linguistics, including the multimedia documentation of Babanki Ritual Speech and documenting the Royal Honorific Language of Bafut, a Grass fields Bantu Language of North West Cameroon.

The university has several projects in disease control, such as the application of molecular biology techniques to tropical diseases led by Professor Vincent P.K Titanji and the Malaria Pilot Community Research Project led by Professor Theresa Akenji. The university also has projects funded by the World Health Organization, Medicine for Malaria Venture, and Wellcome Trust-Oxford University on malaria control.

In addition, the University of Buea has research activities in environmental studies, such as the “Climate variability and climate change in Northern Cameroon” project led by Dr. Ernest Molua and the “Pressures and impact of climate change in Cameroon on Health, water resources, and agriculture: Consideration for immediate and future adaptation strategies” project led by Prof. Samuel Ndonwi Ayonghe.

The university also has projects funded by international organizations such as the International Foundation for Science, European Union, UNICEF, United Nations Development Programme, and World Bank.

Apart from research activities, the University of Buea has several capacity-building projects in collaboration with international organizations such as the African Economic Research Consortium, VLIR, and British Council. These projects aim to strengthen research capacity in the university and promote knowledge transfer.

== Campus and infrastructure ==
The main campus of the University of Buea is situated at the foot of Mount Cameroon, the highest peak in West and Central Africa. The campus spans over 1,000 acres of land and features modern facilities, including lecture halls, teaching research laboratories, libraries, and sports complexes.

UB is connected to an optic fiber link to Camtel, a telecommunications company. In keeping with the New University Governance Policy of Cameroon, the outreach activities of the university are increasingly involving the private sector in funding and training so as to ensure that the graduates are relevant in the labour market. The University of Buea provides assistance and plays a leadership role to several other educational institutions all over Cameroon.

The Google Developer Student Club (GDSC) at the University of Buea helps students interested in Google developer technologies bridge the gap between theory and practice. The club offers workshops, training sessions, hackathons, coding competitions, networking events, and community projects, enabling students to develop their technical skills, collaborate with peers, and engage with professionals in the tech industry.

As in most English-speaking institutions, the governance system of the university is based on structures such as Council, Senate, Congregation and Committees on which staff and students are represented.

== Technology ==
The main campus has a campus-wide optical-fiber network linking most of the buildings. Internet connectivity is provided via a VSAT link.

The IT Centre runs an Internet café for Internet access by staff and students at a modest cost.

The university is making use of recent technology developments. This is done by partnering with top tech companies in Buea, Cameroon. University of Buea is one of the universities in Cameroon that has a 100 percent online registration process. Students apply and complete their admission online.

Students are equally able to register courses online and check results online. The use of mobile money to pay fees is another innovation used by the University of Buea.

== Library ==
The Buea University library operates in two buildings:

- The Main library houses the open stacks book collection, quick reference and general reference books. The library is between the science laboratories, the Faculty of Arts Building and the Annex Library.
- The Annex library is behind the Faculty of Arts Building. It contains special collections — reserve books/lecturer notes, archives, journals and the Cameroon collection. The library also houses cassettes, video tapes, microfilm and CD-ROM resources.

Faculty, staff, and students use the library collection. Alumni, users from institutions affiliated with UB and members of the public can, with authorization, use the library.

== Outreach and cooperation ==
The University of Buea has linkages with foreign universities and cooperation with international organisations. The linkages usually aim at the exchange of staff and students whilst international organisations usually assist the university with capacity building of staff and funding for research. University of Buea is affiliated to the University of Manchester and is also a member of the Association of Commonwealth Universities.

The University has introduced a new Master of Science Degree in Disaster Risk Management in 2018, demonstrating its commitment to capacity building for young professionals and experts across various sectors. The program aims to equip participants with the skills to address current and future natural and man-made hazards and disasters in the Central African Sub-Region, particularly in Cameroon.

In 2020, an agreement was signed to strengthen the relationship between the University of Buea and the Biaka University Institute of Buea and to mentor BUIB in their academic activities, particularly in the introduction of new postgraduate programs. The Faculties of Health Sciences and Social and Management Sciences at UB will lead the implementation of this agreement.

== Notable alumni ==
- Shakiro (born 1997), influencer and activist.

== Gallery ==
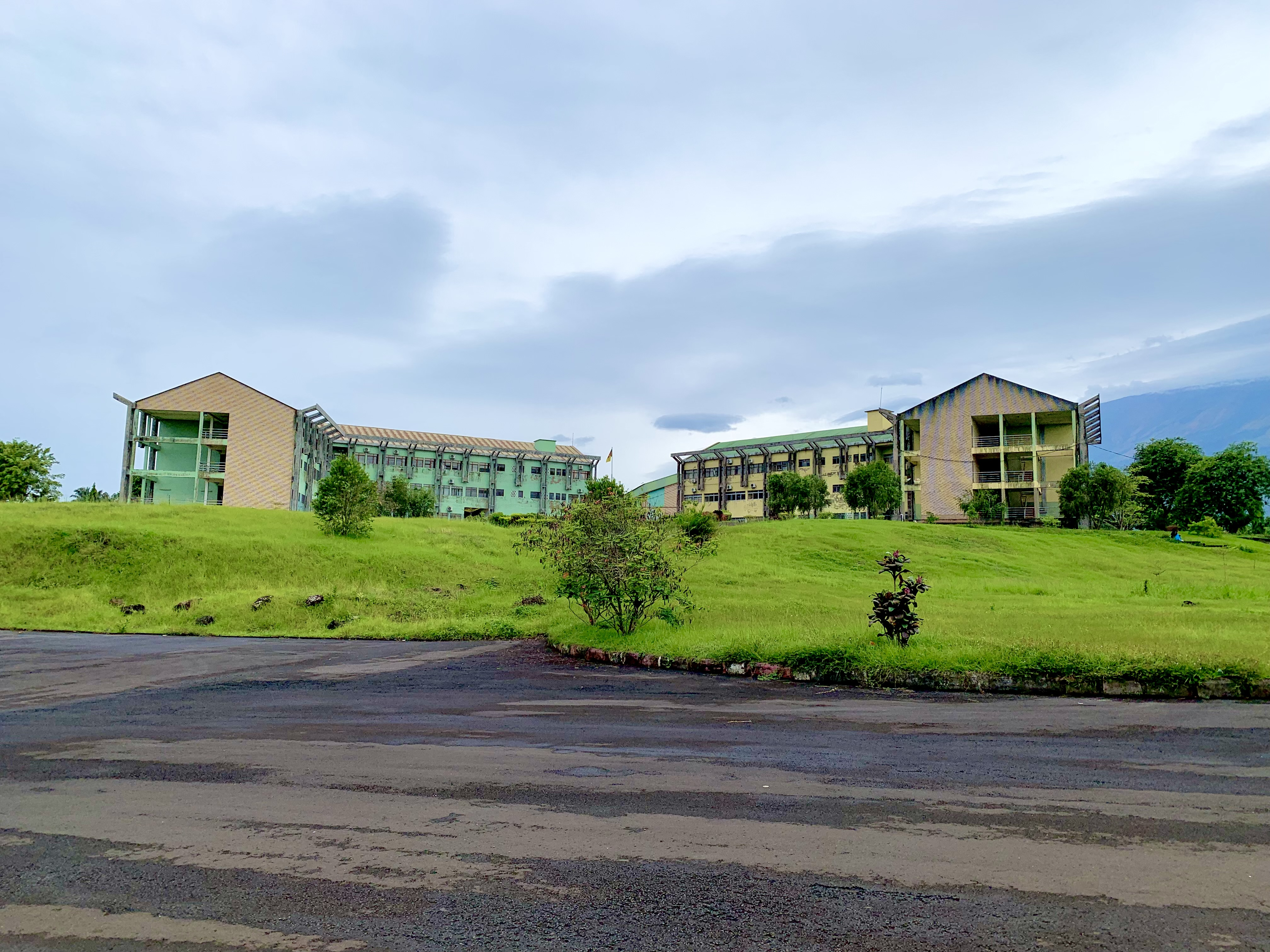
University of Buea Campus B

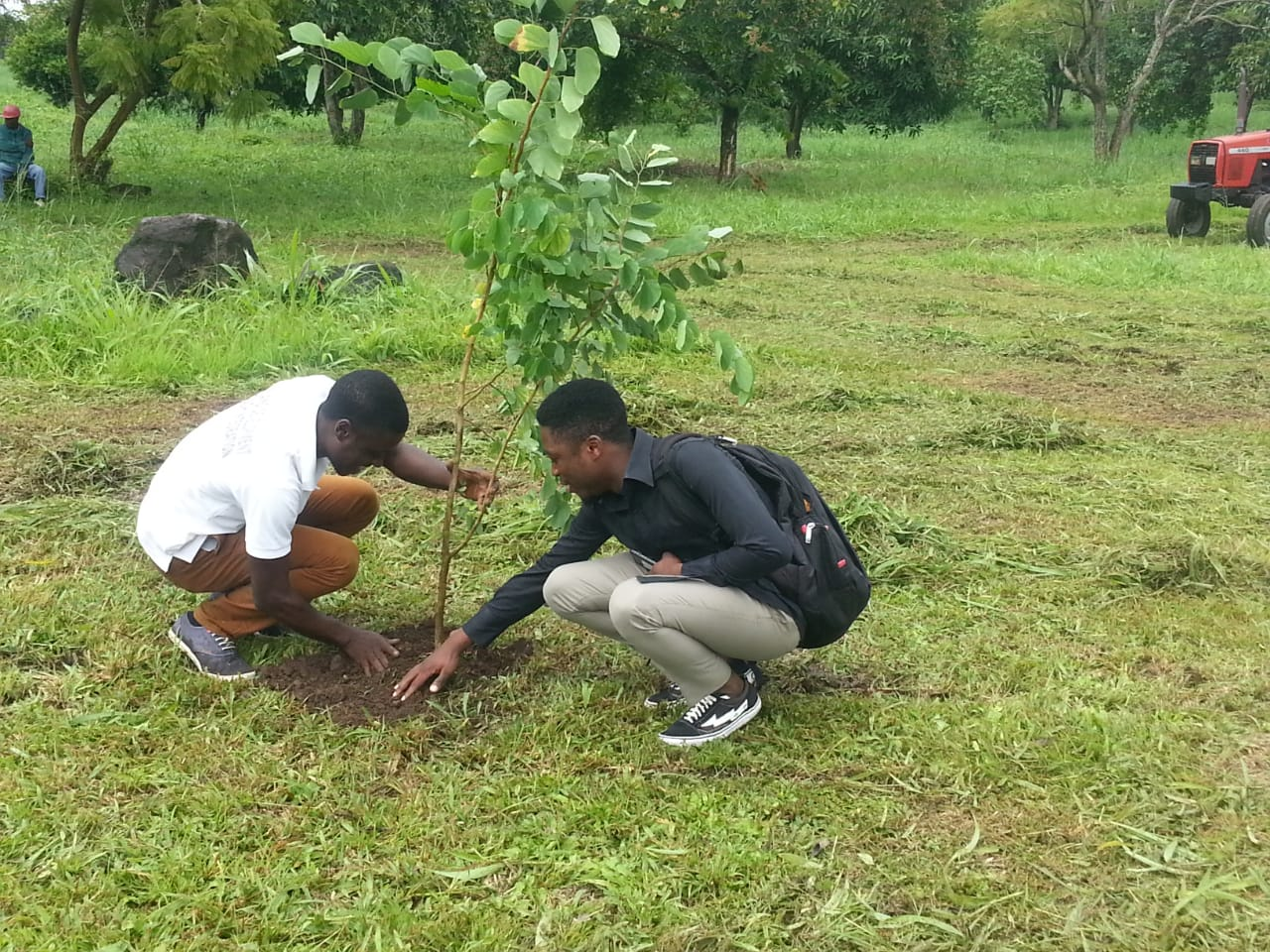
Tree planting at the University campus
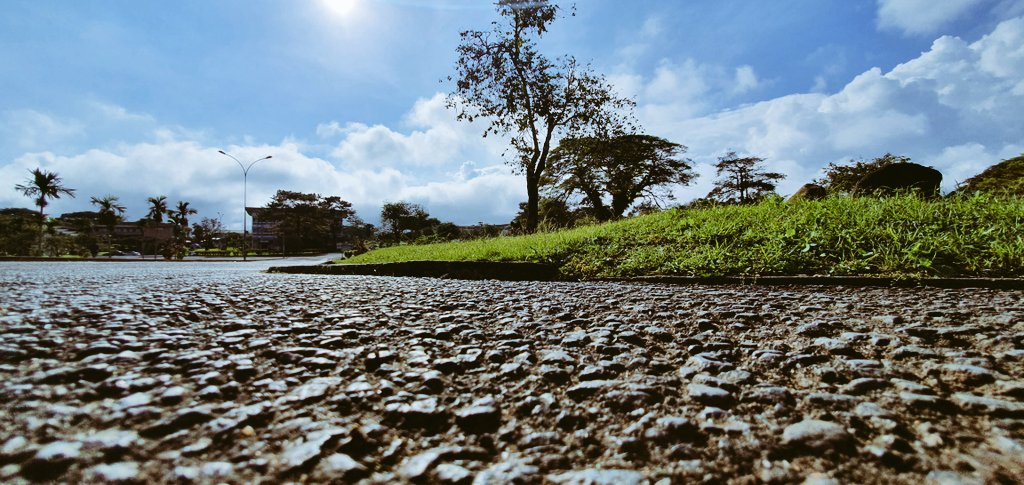
Second Gate of the University of Buea Entrance
Morning View of the university of Buea

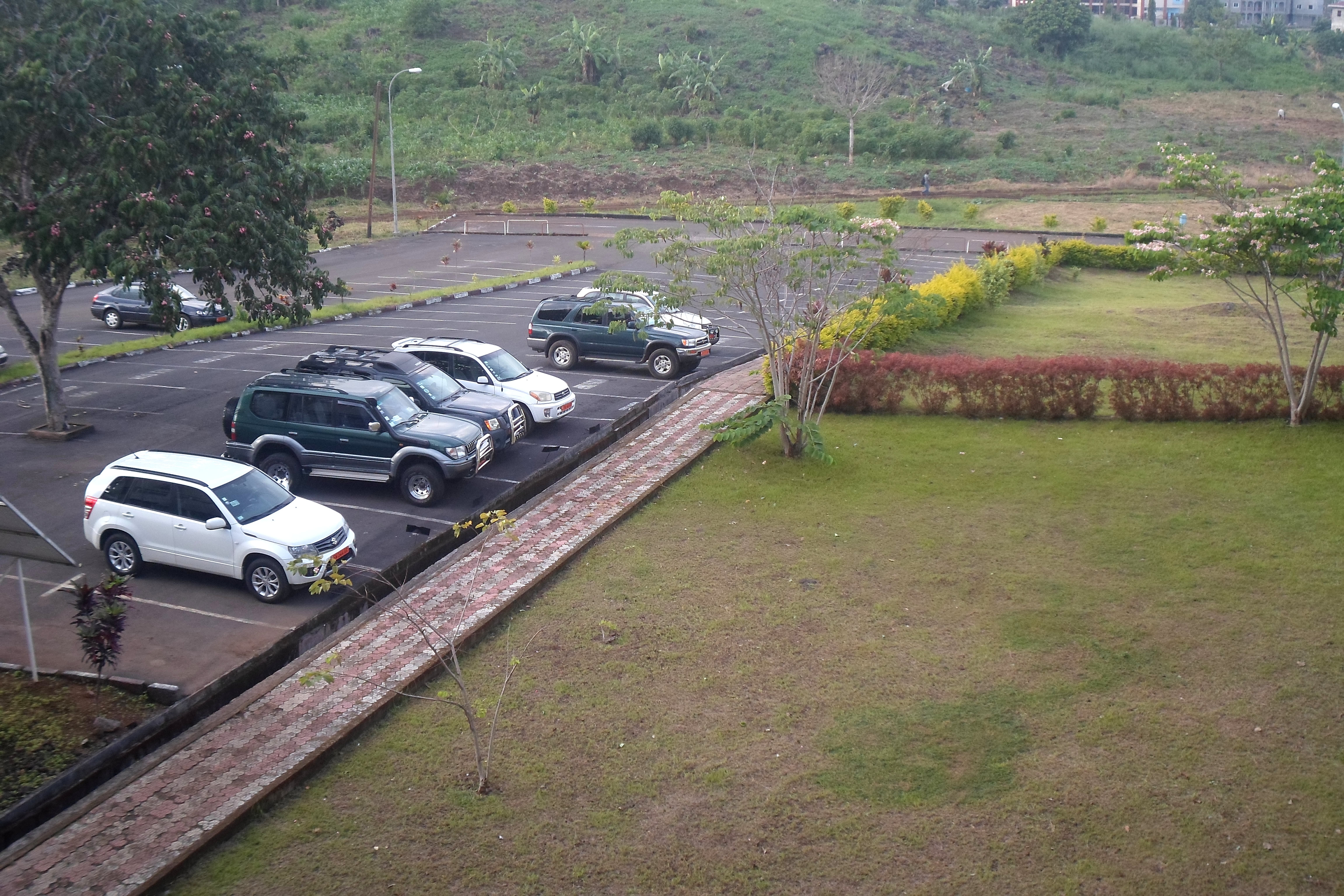
Parking space in the University of Buea

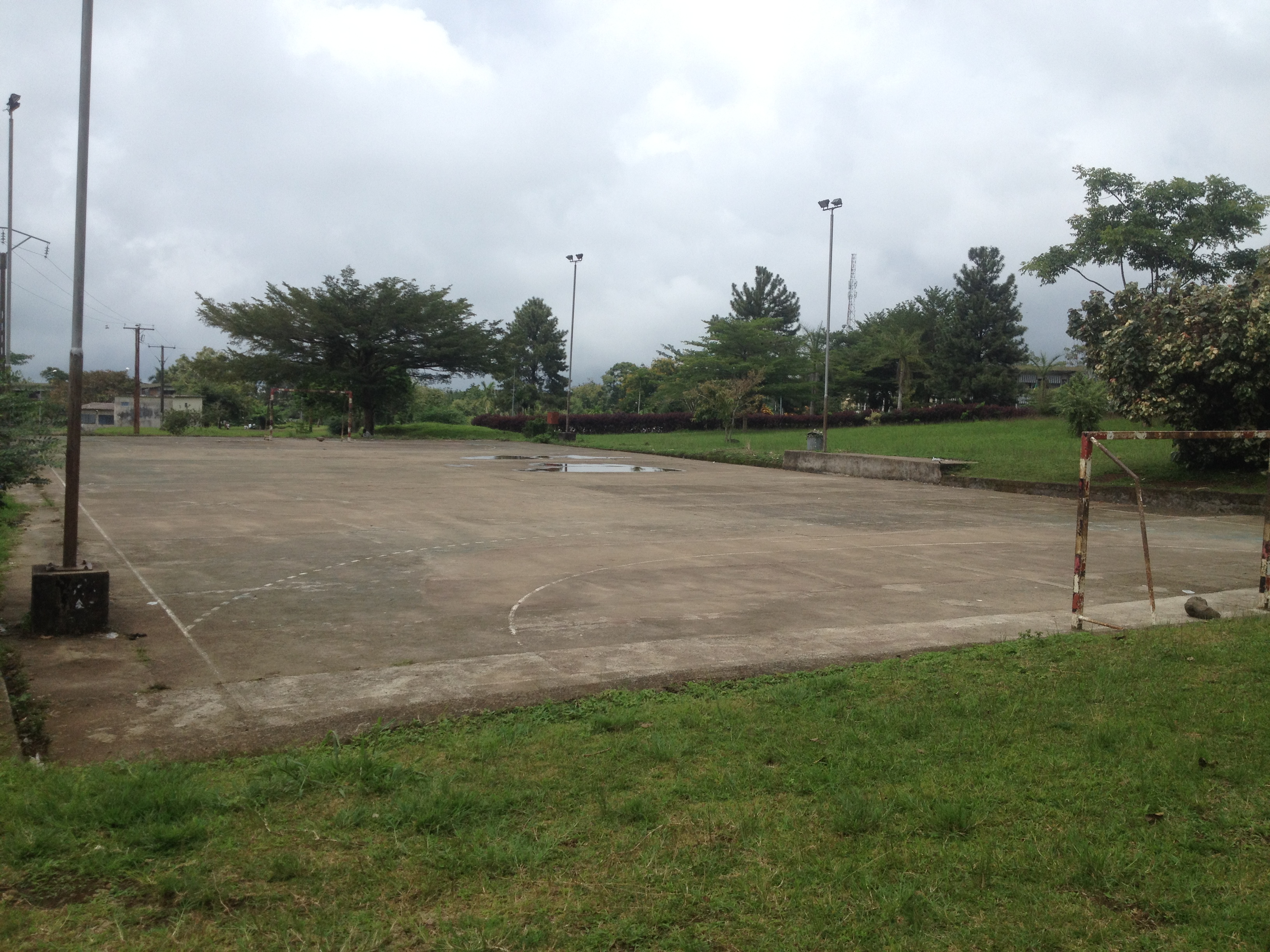
Handball court at UB campsu

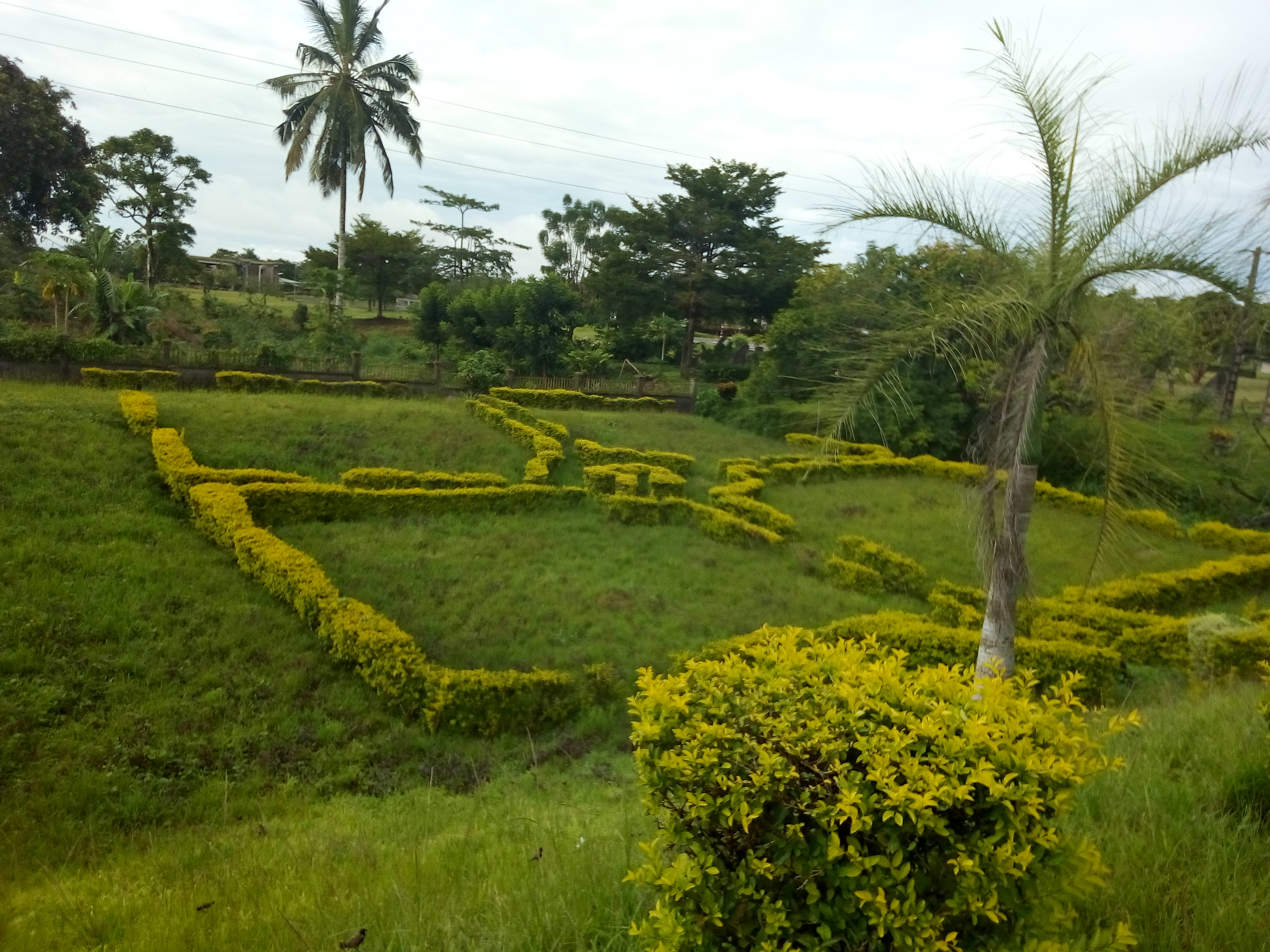
Flower garden

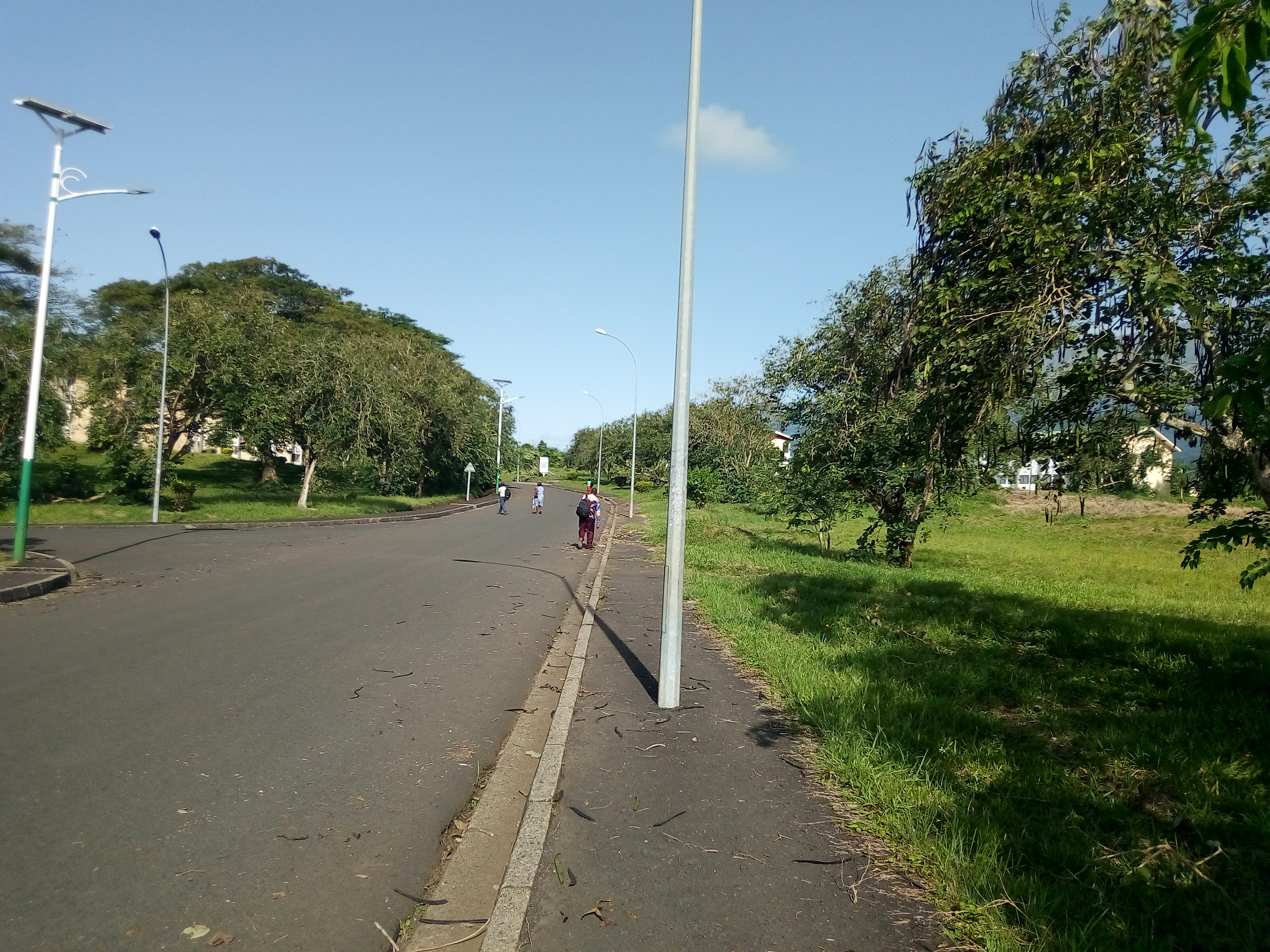
Street lights on campus

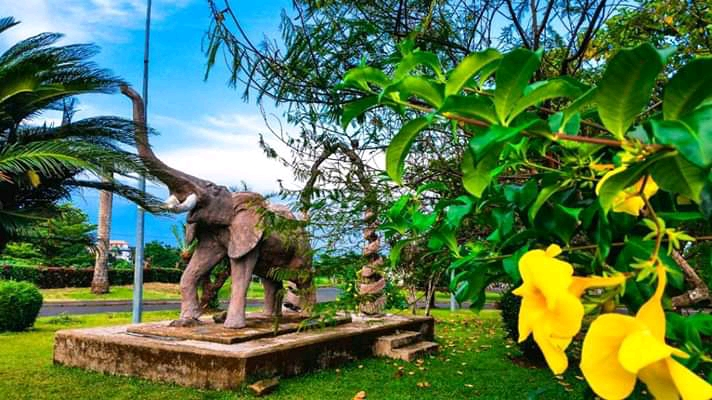
Elephant monument at UB campus

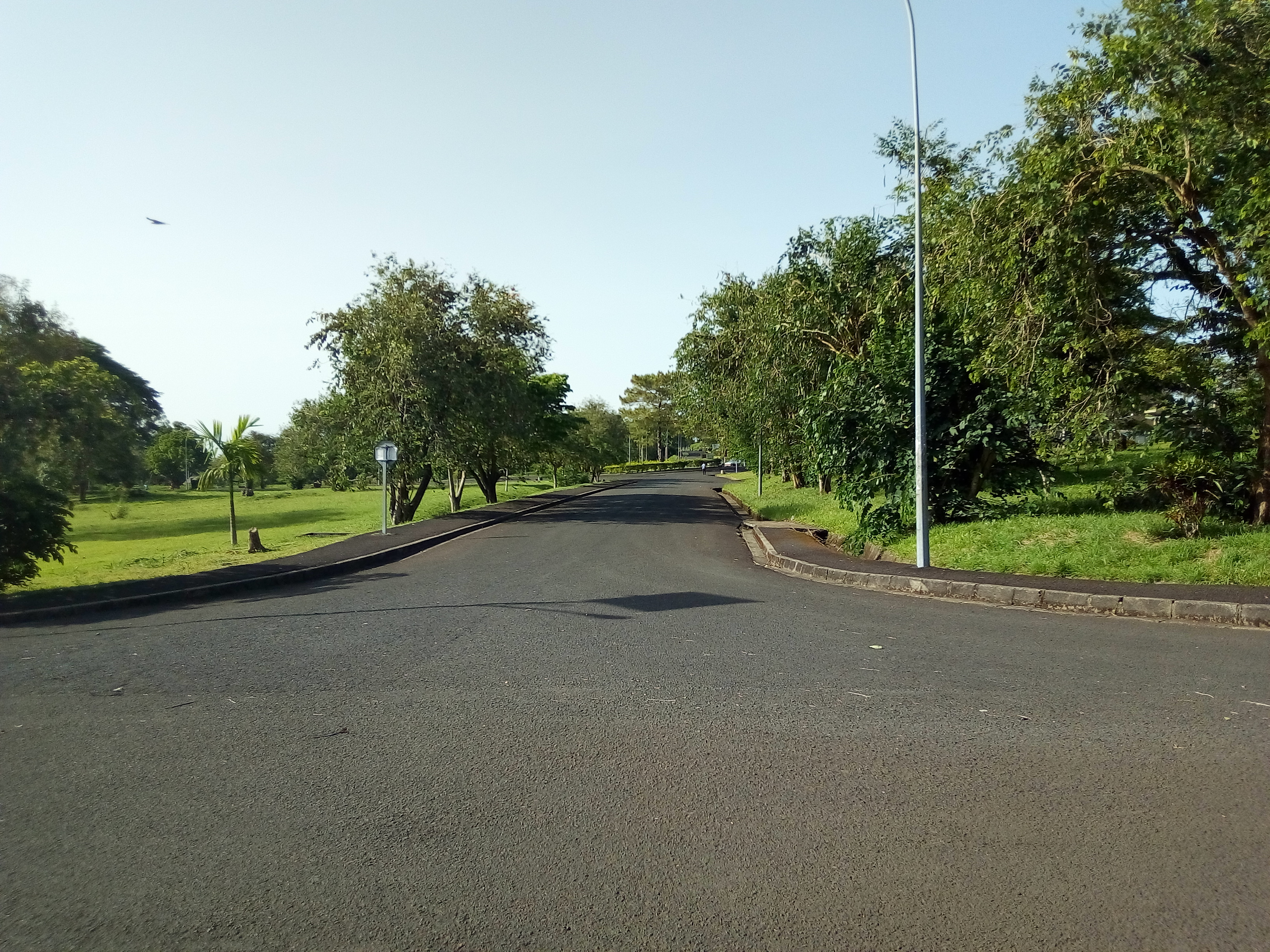
Campus street
