= List of Cameroonian musicians =

List of Cameroonian musicians and musical groups, categorized by their primary contribution to the Music of Cameroon.

== A ==
- Asaba

== B ==
- Blanche Bailly
- Diboué Black
- Richard Bona

== C ==
- Charlotte Dipanda

== D ==
- Daphne
- Manu Dibango

== E ==
- Stanley Enow

== F ==
- Francis Bebey

== G ==
- Zangalewa (Golden Sounds)
- Grace Decca

== J ==
- Jovi

== K ==
- Michael Kiessou
- Kristo Numpuby

== L ==
- Lady Ponce
- Lapiro de Mbanga
- Les Têtes Brulées

== M ==
- Wes Madiko
- Magasco
- Moni Bilé
- Bébé Manga
- Coco Mbassi
- Mimie
- Mr. Leo

== N ==
- Yannick Noah
- Sally Nyolo

== P ==
- Petit Pays

== R ==
- Reniss

== S ==
- Sabrina
- Salatiel
- Sam Fan Thomas

== V ==
- Vagabon

== Y ==
- Yung Swiss

== See also ==
- Music of Cameroon
- List of African musicians
