= PhillBill =

Cameroonian singer, songwriter and producer

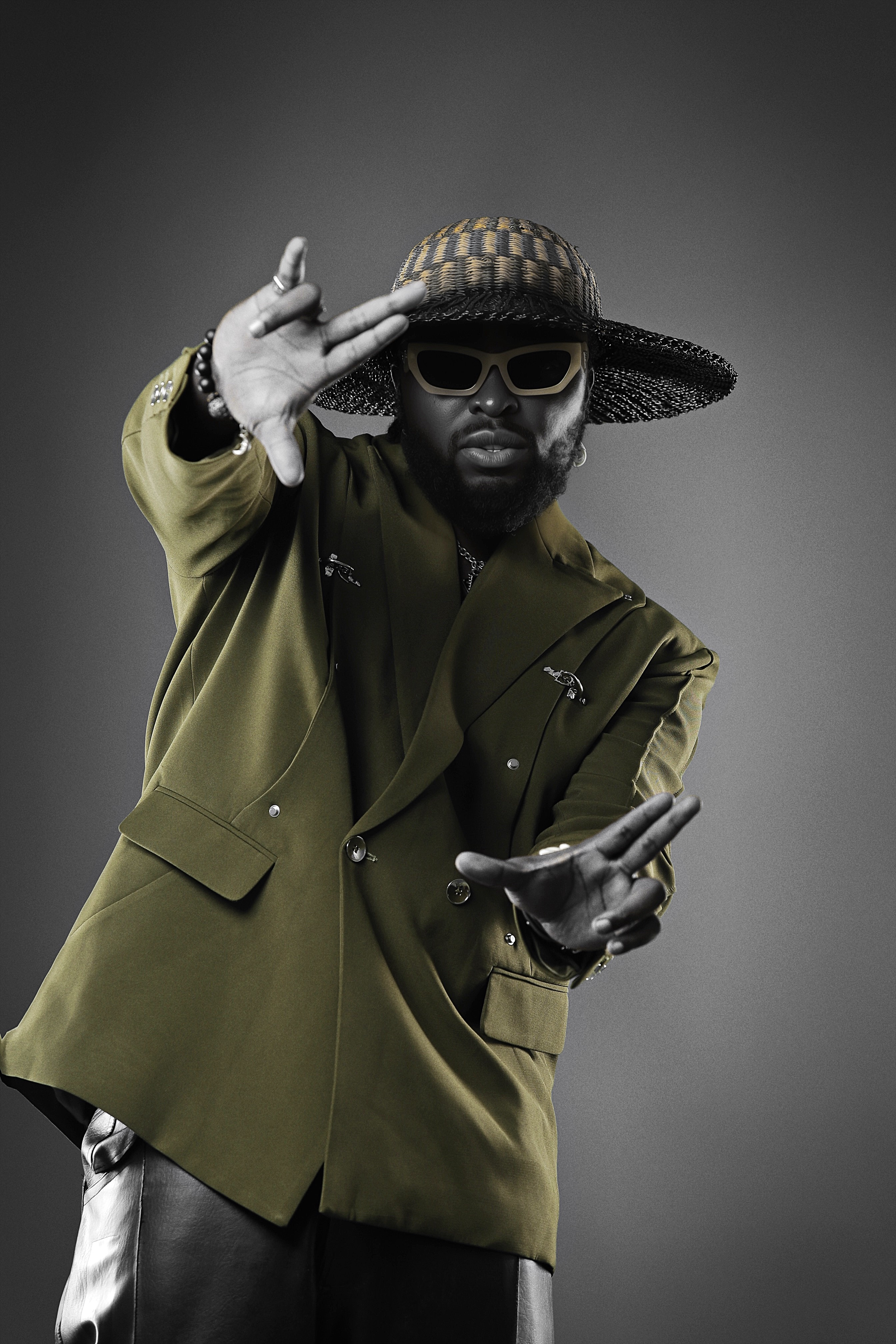
- Cameroonian singer and producer PhillBill

Background information
- Also known as: Shaba
- Born: Diyani Bill Munyenge; 27 December 1991 (age 34); Buea, Cameroon
- Origin: Cameroon
- Genres: Bikossa, Afropop, Afro-fusion
- Occupations: Singer, songwriter, music producer, sound engineer
- Years active: 2010–present
- Label: Shaba Entertainment

Diyani Bill Munyenge (born 27 December 1991), known professionally as PhillBill, is a Cameroonian singer, songwriter, music producer and sound engineer. He first became known as a music producer under the name PhillBill Beatz and later as a member of the Cameroonian music group Ridimz.. PhillBill is associated with the development of the Bikossa musical style, which has been discussed in Cameroonian media in relation to his solo career. His work has received recognition through awards and nominations including the TRACE Awards, AFRIMMA, Canal d'Or Awards and Balafon Music Awards.

== Early life and education ==
Diyani Bill Munyenge (PhillBill) was born in Buea, Cameroon. He attended Bilingual Grammar School Buea and later studied Performing and Visual Arts at the University of Buea. According to Music in Africa, he travelled to Nigeria in 2008 to develop his music production skills before returning to Cameroon.

== Career ==
=== Early production work ===
After returning to Cameroon, PhillBill began producing music under the name PhillBill Beatz. His production work has been associated with artists including Blanche Bailly, Ko-C, Mimie, Daphne and Locko.

=== Ridimz ===
PhillBill was a member of the Cameroonian music group Ridimz, formerly known as Rythmz. The group released music including Honeymoon, Addiction and Shabasiko before its members later pursued separate careers.

=== Solo career ===
After Ridimz, PhillBill continued as a solo artist. His releases include La Clé, Même Si Tu Pars, Bikossa, Malova, Sélé, Condiment and TÈTÈRI. In June 2025, he released the EP The SoundMan.

In August 2026, PhillBill was the subject of an episode of the BBC World Service programme This Is Africa. The programme discussed his career as an artist and producer, his move from Buea to Douala, and the influence of Cameroonian languages and musical traditions on his work.

=== The SoundMan Tour ===
In 2025, PhillBill launched The SoundMan Tour, with performances in Cameroon and Germany.

== Bikossa ==
PhillBill has been linked by Cameroonian media to Bikossa, a musical style connected to Cameroonian rhythms and contemporary African music.

== Production work ==
PhillBill has production credits connected to artists including Blanche Bailly, Ko-C, Mimie, Daphne and Locko. The BBC World Service has also reported on his production work for Kocee, Daphne and Blanche Bailly from Cameroon and Roseline Layo from Ivory Coast.

He contributed to several tracks on Locko's album Era, including Yayé, Bloqué, Sawa Lady, Manuluv and Même même chose. The album later received Gold certification in France.

The BBC World Service also reported that PhillBill produced Paris Fever, a collaboration involving Senegalese artist Wally Seck and Chris Brown.

== Philanthropy ==
PhillBill founded Reach for the Stars Group, an organisation focused on supporting children and young people through educational, cultural and community programmes.

== Recognition ==
PhillBill and his work have been covered by the BBC World Service, Music in Africa, Cameroon Tribune, Fidèle Au Poste, Mdundo and Mimi Mefo Info.

== Other activities ==
In 2022, PhillBill was listed as a jury member for the World Bank Group's Youth Act on Education campaign. He has also been listed among the jury members for Mützig Star.

== Discography ==
=== Extended plays ===
- The SoundMan (2025)

=== Selected singles ===
- Shabasiko
- La Clé
- Bikossa
- Malova
- Même Si Tu Pars
- Sélé
- Condiment
- TÈTÈRI

=== Collaborations ===
- Banga with Blanche Bailly
- 237 Mood with Mimie
- Malova featuring Krys M
- Ça vient de chez nous with Darina Victry
- Facture featuring Mic Monsta
- Sawale featuring Roseline Layo
- OWA featuring Jovi

== Awards and nominations ==
Year	Award / Organisation	Category	Result	Ref.
2019	Urban Jamz Awards	Best Group	Won	
2020	Green Light Awards	Best Beatmaker	Won	
2020	Best Talent Cameroon	Best Music Producer	Won	
2021	Best Talent Cameroon	Best Music Producer	Won	
2021	Best Talent Cameroon	Best Music Label	Won	
2021	CMEA Awards	Best Music Producer	Won	
2021	MUMA Awards	Best Music Producer	Won	
2021	Balafon Music Awards	Best Beatmaker	Won	
2021	CIMFEST Awards	CIMFEST Excellence Award for Music Production	Won	
2021	Cameroon Evolution Awards	Best Music Producer	Won	
2022	Cameroon Evolution Awards	Best Music Producer	Won	
2022	Urban Jamz Awards	Best Music Video Performance	Won	
2022	Urban Jamz Awards	Best Music Producer	Won	
2022	All Africa Music Awards	Music Producer of the Year	Nominated	
2023	All Africa Music Awards	Best Producer	Nominated	
2023	All Africa Music Awards	Best Musical Artist	Nominated	
2023	Canal d'Or Awards	Best Artist or Band Inspired by Traditional Music	Won	
2023	Canal d'Or Awards	Best Male Afro-Urban Artist or Band	Won	
2023	PRIMUD	Best Artist from Central Africa	Nominated	
2023	Balafon Music Awards	Best Beatmaker	Won	
2023	Balafon Music Awards	Best Dance Video	Won	
2023	Balafon Music Awards	Best Costume and Decor	Won	
2024	Balafon Music Awards	Best Beatmaker	Won	
2025	TRACE Awards	Best Artist Francophone Africa	Nominated	
2025	Cameroon Evolution Awards	Best Performer	Nominated	

== Selected performances ==
- FEMUA, Ivory Coast
- Mother Africa Festival
- Nyangon Ma Fierté
- Festival Le Challenge Cameroon, Germany
- CIMFEST
- Canal 2’or
- TRACE Awards and Summit
- European Tour, 2023–2024
- The SoundMan Tour, Institute Français
- AFROMADA Music Awards Madagascar
- SoundMan Buea Omnisport Stadium
- SoundMan Amusement Park Kumba
