= Nganù =

2023 Cameroonian film

- Directed by: Kang Quintus
- Written by: Proxy Buh, and Enah Johnscott
- Produced by: Godisz Fungwa
- Starring: Akwandou Blaise Atarrimah; Hakeem Kae-Kazim; Muriel Blanche
- Cinematography: Takong Delvis
- Production company: Kang Quintus Film
- Distributed by: The Fu'a Touala Kadji Defosso Foundation,Netflix
- Release date: 7 November 2023
- Running time: 101 minutes
- Country: Cameroon
- Language: Cameroonian Pidgin English

Nganù is a 2023 Cameroonian drama film co-written, co-produced, and directed by Kang Quintus. The film stars Hakeem Kae-Kazim, Alenne Menget, and Azah Melvin.

== Plot ==
Nganu a troubled farmer living in a remote village in Cameroon with his wife, Meukeuna, and their son, Kum. He is plagued by his violent past, and frequently abuses his wife and son, blaming them for his own misfortunes. Tormented by memories of his abusive father and the suffering endured by his mother during his childhood.

Nganu's behavior worsens when he discovers that Meukeuna is pregnant, leading him to accuse her of infidelity. His suspicion that Kum is not his biological son fuels his hostility towards the boy. Concerned neighbors suggest that Nganu join the army, hoping it will provide him with a sense of purpose and help him manage his anger. Reluctantly, Nganu enlists and is introduced to Captain Bello, a strict but fair officer who recognizes his potential. In the military, Nganu forms bonds with fellow soldiers like Nabil and Ko-C, who share their personal stories and experiences with him.

These interactions lead Nganu to gradually respect and trust his comrades, showing signs of personal growth and remorse for his past actions. However, the violence and atrocities he witnesses in the army reignite his old traumas, exacerbating his aggression. When he learns of his wife's childbirth, his obsession with their paternity and fidelity intensifies.

Nganu deserts the army and returns to his village, armed and unstable. He confronts Meukeuna and Kum, demanding the truth about their paternity and threatening to kill them if they lie. The confrontation culminates in a dramatic showdown that determines the fate of Nganu and his family.

== Cast ==
- Kang Quintus as Nganu
- Hakeem Kae-Kazim as Akwah
- Muriel Blanche as Akwa's Wife
- Njang Mengu Collins as (Ko-C)
- Yimbu Emmanuel as Njoya
- Askia Karin as Caro(Askia)
- Bernadette Kameni as Market Trader
- Mendong Joseph as Joseph Manti Mendong
- Ayuk Gareth as Kum
- Nabil Fongod as Weed Side Boy
- Musing Daniels as Musing Daniel
- Okarabi Bright as Market Trader
- Azah Melvine as Meukeuna
- Ihimbru Maurice Kudi as Farmer
- Alenne Menget

== Production ==
The film was produced by Kang Quintus Film. Directed by Kang Quintus. in partnership with The Fu'a Touala Kadji Defosso Foundation and Cameroon Ministry Of Defense.

== Release ==
The film was made available on Netflix on November 7, 2023.

== Critical reception ==
It was listed among the top movies of 2023 at Eko International Film Festival (EKOIFF) held in Lagos, Nigeria, and received the award for Best Feature Film.

Joseph Jonathan of Afrocritik gave the film 2.5 out of 5, praising its character development and Kang Quintus's performance. He criticized the editing, length, visual effects and makeup, saying some scenes were unnecessary or repetitive. Writing for A Good Movie to Watch, Emil Hofileña criticized Nganù for its lack of technical polish, saying that this sometimes resulted in unintentional comedy despite the serious subject matter. He also felt that some attempts to make the film feel bigger than it needed to be were misjudged. However, he praised the film when it focused on its intimate human drama, particularly its portrayal of a violent man trying to redeem himself. Hofileña also praised the film's strict sense of morality. Benoit Yuven Of The Hotjem gave Nganù a rating of 7 out of 10. Yuven praised Kang Quintus's performance in the title role, as well as the performances of Azah Melvin, Ayuk Gareth and Alenne Menget. He also praised the film's soundtrack and its message about domestic violence and abuse. However, the review criticized the editing, particularly the repetition of scenes, and the film runtime. Noting that the military scenes took up too much of the film and at times moved away from its main subject.

== Awards and nominations ==
Nganù has received several awards and nominations, including:

- Best Film at the Eko International Film Festival (2023)
- Best Actor for (Kang Quintus) at the Eko International Film Festival (2023)

== See also ==
- List of Cameroonian films
