= Muzikol Music Awards =

MUMA Award
- Awarded for: Outstanding performances in the African and Cameroonian music industry
- Date: November 13, 2020
- Location: Douala
- Country: Cameroon
- Hosted by: Nges Brian
- Most nominations: ... (9)
- Website: muzikolmusicawards.com

The Muzikol Music Awards (commonly known as the MUMA) is a music awards program developed by a technology company in Cameroon called ABEBOH and run by its Music product called Muzikol. The Main objective of Muzikol Music awards is to reward and celebrate outstanding performances in the African and Cameroonian Music Industries. Muzikol Music Awards is aimed at celebrating the African music Industry through the music, the musicians and all the music professionals who make up the music industry.

== Background ==
Muzikol Music Awards was launched to give back recognition for well-deserved African music stakeholders free of bias and favors. The MUMAs do this by using Artificial Intelligence tools in the nominations process, voting system, and also in determining the final winners. In 2017, Nges Brian founded Muzikol which is a one-stop-shop for musical services and products and also a music social network to sell Cameroonian musical products and at the same time, connect the Musicians with friends and families. In 2020, Muzikol expanded its activities from online to offline by launching and executing the first edition of the Muzikol Music Awards in Douala - Cameroon which brought together thousands of music stakeholders from allover Cameroon

== Structure ==
Muzikol Music Awards is divided into two main types of categories namely statistics categories and voters categories. In the Statistics Categories, a panel of judges called the Nominations Committee selects the nominees through a grading process. The nominees submit judging forms through the Awards portal and the final judging committee selects the final winners through a grading process. In the Voters Categories, the general public submits nominees through the online portal. The nominations committee selects the final nominees through a grading process. The winners for voters Categories come directly from the web portal using votes.

== First MUMA (MUMA 2020) ==
MUMA 2020 was a celebrated program for music stakeholders in Cameroon and across Africa. Burna Boy, Wizkid, Eddy Kenzo, Shatta Wale, Rudeboy and many others were the nominees for MUMA 2020.

=== MUMA2020 Winners ===
Category	Winner
Best African Artist	Shatta Wale
Biggest African Music Exporter	Rema
Best African Song	Master KG ft Nocembo - Jerusalema
Best Male Artist	Stanley Enow
Best Female Artist	Blanche Bailly
Best Urban Artist	Magasco
Best Traditional Artist	Mola Mongombe
Best Gospel Artist	Asheck Blessing
Best Hip Hop Artist	Mic Monsta
Best Video Director	Dr Nkeng Stephens
Best Songwriter	Salatiel
Best Artist Manager	Johnathan Bapidi
Best Public Relations	Ndicho Boris
Best Event Organizer	Bliss International Holdings
Best Record Label	Lionn Production
Best Music Promoter	Titi Pro
Best DJ	Dertsman DJ
Best Music Broadcast Channel	Boom TV
Best Album/EP	Jovi- God Don Kam
Next Rated Musical Artist	Vivid
Next Rated Musically Related Artist	Fon Noel
Changing Music Innovation	Vosaworld Radion
Best Showbiz Supporter	Dacosta Watson
Legends Award	Bobe Yerima Afo-Akom
Under 20 Talent Award	Coporate Esimo
Best Performer	Blanche Bailly
Best MC/Host	MC Charlene
Best Dance Group	Family Dance Crew
Best Song	Aveiro Djess - Rambo
Best Collaboration	Tzy Panchak ft Verynuy Tina, Cleo Grae, Vivid - Naso
Best Visual/Graphic Artist	Asek Art
Best Music Magazine/Blog	Miss Gina Promotes
Best Music Producer	Dijay Karl
