= IBali =

Cameroonian musician

Ibali
- Birth name: Ataindum Donald Nge
- Born: September 2, 1997 (age 27); Bamenda, Cameroon
- Genres: Afrobeat, Jazz, World Music
- Occupation(s): Singer, songwriter
- Instrument(s): Vocals, Piano
- Labels: House Of Legends
- Website: ibaliofficial.com

Ataindum Donald Nge (born September 2, 1997) is a Cameroonian musical artist and performer, professionally known by his stage name Ibali. He is also a human rights activist.

== Early life and career ==
Ibali was born in the West African city of Bamenda, Cameroon. Ibali has 3 siblings and is the first child from a monogamous family. He began recording music in 2014 with Brand name "Dolly Pearl" and created his first live music band known as Wuli'bali Band in 2017. iBali released several songs with some featuring artists like Richard Kings, Magasco, Blaise B, and Daddy Black.

Ibali was crowned Cameroon Music Messiah by the Association of Cameroon Dj's after the release of One People. In January 2021, Ibali launched his new video 'Revelation' under his album 'Prophetic'.

== Discography ==
=== Albums ===
- Prophetic (2021)

=== Singles ===
- Legendary
- One People
- Revelation

=== Collaborations ===
- Dolly Pearl ft Blaise B
- Dolly Pearl Cado ft Daddy Black

=== Awards and nominations ===
Year	Event	Prize	Result	Ref
2021	Muzikol Music Awards	Best Traditional Artist	Nominated	
