= The Devil on Trial =

2023 Netflix documentary by Chris Holt

- Promotional poster for The Devil on Trial
- Directed by: Charvi Bajaj
- Written by: Chris Holt
- Based on: The Trial of Arne Cheyenne Johnson
- Produced by: Hattie Bridges Webb; Amy Lee-Jones; Sam Starbuck; Julia Nottingham; Dominik Danielewicz
- Cinematography: Brendan McGinty
- Edited by: Joby Gee; Sebastian Smith
- Music by: Tom Howe
- Production company: Dorothy Street Pictures
- Distributed by: Netflix
- Release date: October 17, 2023 (USA)
- Running time: 81 min
- Country: United Kingdom
- Language: English

The Devil on Trial is a 2023 Netflix horror documentary exploring the case of Arne Cheyenne Johnson. During the trial, Johnson's attorney attempted to use "demonic possession" as a defense, but presiding Judge Robert Callahan rejected that argument.

== Synopsis ==
The story revolves around the murder following the alleged possession of Arne Cheyenne Johnson. Using a combination of reenactments, home videos, and firsthand accounts, The Devil on Trial investigates the 1981 case. During the trial, Johnson's attorney attempted to use "demonic possession" as a defense, but presiding Judge Robert Callahan rejected that argument. It was the first and only time the defense attorney in a U.S. murder trial attempted to use demonic possession as a reason for acquittal.

== Cast ==
- Carlo Adamo as Father Dennis
- Hannah Mae Beatty as Debbie Glatzel
- David Glatzel as himself
- Alan Glatzel as himself
- Carl Glatzel as himself
- Arne Cheyenne Johnson as himself
- Foster Hamilton
- Susannah Spearin
- Adam Hunt
- Raine Van Elsacker

== Production ==
Directed and written by Chris Holt, the film's production team includes line producer Dominik Danielewicz, co-executive producer Amy Lee-Jones, and executive producers Julia Nottingham and Sam Starbuck. The music was composed by Tom Howe, with Brendan McGinty serving as the director of photography.

Production began in October 2021 and wrapped in May 2023, with Dorothy Street Pictures listed as the production company.

Dorothy Street Pictures worked with Make Productions, a UK company, to help retouch the Polaroid images relied on in the film. AI software was used to increase resolution.

=== Sominex ===
Included in the interviews with Carl Glatzel is the concern that their mother had been drugging them with Sominex on a regular basis, by putting it into their evening meals. Newsweek asked the medical director of UCI Health Sleep Medicine Services about the possibility that Sominex could be an explanation for the alleged possession, only to be told that medicines containing diphenhydramine hydrochloride are only meant for short term use, and that there are no studies on potential long-term effects.

== Release ==
The Devil on Trial was released on Netflix on October 17, 2023. The film is rated TV-MA and is 81 minutes in length.

== Reception ==
The New York Times stated the content was superficial and inconclusive, with the material having been 'mined' for "lurid titillation". The Daily Beast commented that the recordings of David Glatzel's alleged possession, obtained via microphones placed by the Warrens at the time, sounded "like a young kid straining to say wildly profane things." A Good Movie to Watch stated that Netflix "should try harder".

The Decider suggested viewers "skip it", stating that the film spends a lot of time indicating that there may be some basis to the claim of possession before focusing on the eldest of the Glatzel siblings, Carl, who believed otherwise. Common Sense Media asserted that the film would engender debates on "the world of the unknown".

The GATE mentions that the film left them feeling empty and expressed disappointment that Carl Glatzel's statements weren't more thoroughly incorporated in the presentation of the case, describing the film as "basic" and saying that it didn't capture their attention.

The Diamondback review is very positive, stating that the presentation left them conflicted as to whether the possession happened, but that it was very entertaining. The Daily Campus shares the sentiment, giving the documentary a 4.5 out of 5.

Screen Rant points out that the documentary presents the Warrens as legitimate, which they say detracts from the documentary's impact. They also point out that The Devil on Trial is far from the first documentary on the subject. /Film counters this, acknowledging that the Warrens are not given the same positive press that they receive in The Conjuring franchise, while acknowledging that there is concern over the presentation of the possession in the audio tapes.

== See also ==
- Trial of Arne Cheyenne Johnson
- Exorcism
