= Asaba (singer) =

Cameroonian singer, songwriter and vocalist

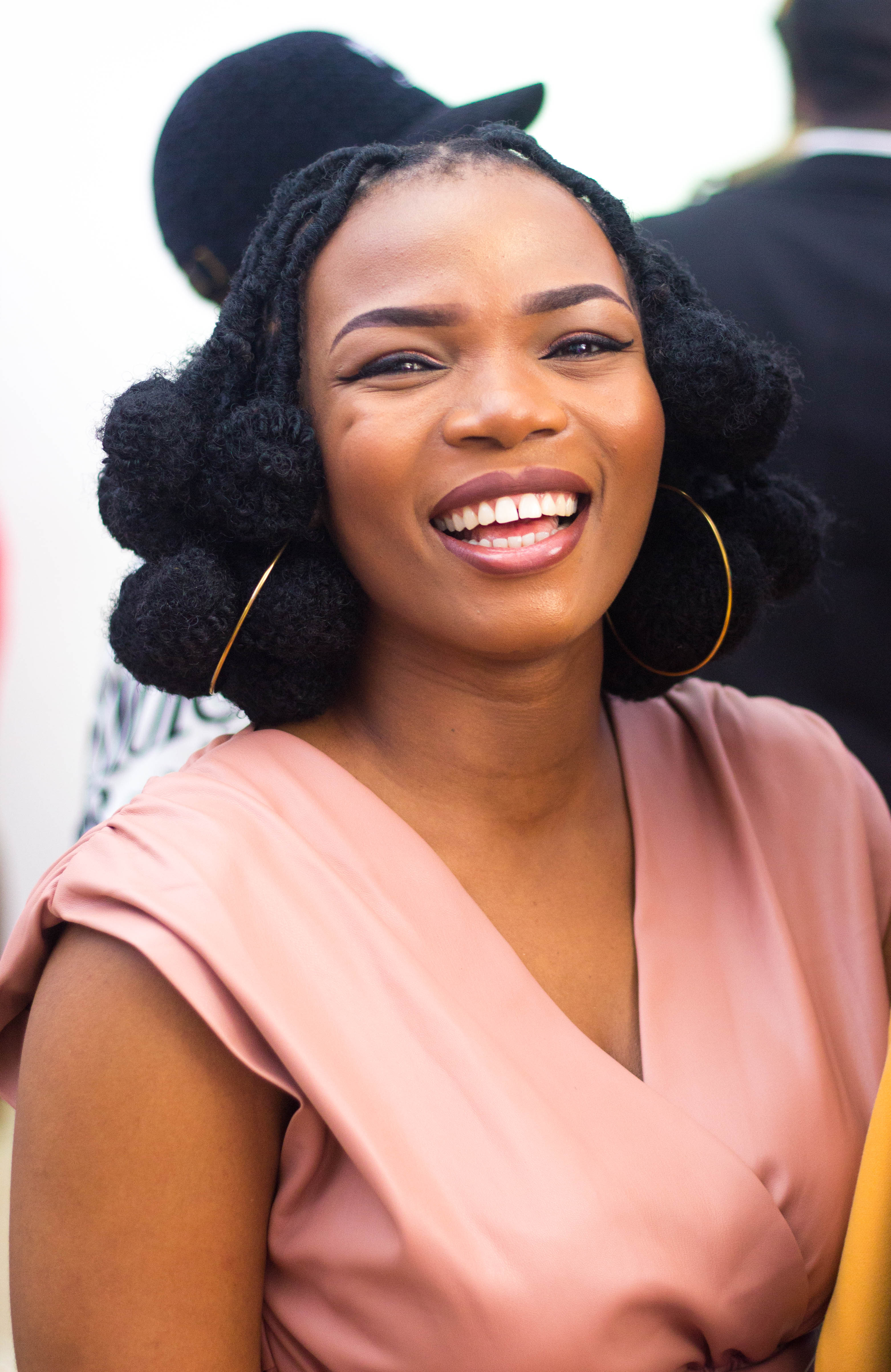
- Asaba in 2021

Background information
- Born: Mary Asombang Asaba; 7 July 1994 (age 31); Muea, Cameroon
- Origin: Lebialem, Southwest Region, Cameroon
- Genres: Afropop, afrobeats,
- Occupations: Singer, songwriter
- Instrument: Vocals
- Years active: 2007–present
- Label: Starfish Entertainment

Mary Asombang Asaba (born 7 July 1992), known professionally as Asaba, is a Cameroonian singer, songwriter, vocalist and a professional nurse. She was born in Muea, Buea.

== Biography ==
Asaba hails from the Lebialem department, precisely from the Bangwa ethnicity of the south-West region of Cameroon, Asaba was born on 7 July 1992 in Muea, in the district of Buea. She was raised alone by her mother. During her primary and secondary school days, she earned nicknames such as Choir Mistress, Bagis, Delta State, DJ Christina, etc. due to her ability to entertain people. As she grew up, she developed further inspiration from artists such as Charlotte Dipanda, Whitney Houston, Adele, Simi, Andra Day and Asa.

In 2018, Asaba obtained a state registered nurse diploma at the Biaka University Institute in Buea. After her studies, she moved to Yaounde for a professional internship at the Yaoundé Central Hospital where she served for 8 months. Soon after, she was employed at an occupational health and safety company in Limbe called Noiia LTD.

== Career ==
In 2007, she was introduced to the label Trackzone Records as a Gospel singer. There she met Daphne, Martin Dachristo among others.

In 2009, DJ Subzee, the owner of TrackZone Records introduced her to M1 Studios. It was there that she began to shape her musical career. She came into contact with the likes of Emile Ngomba, Salatiel, Mr Leo, Adelle Clarice and Myra Davida.

In November 2016, she participated in a theme song for the African Women's Cup of Nations titled We Are Champions alongside Salatiel, Mr Leo, Daphne, Mink's and many others to support the Cameroon Women's Team. Football during the competition.

In 2016, she participated in the Ebola virus awareness project entitled We Do It For Africa to pay tribute to all those who lost their lives as a result of the virus and to all the children who were orphaned by the pandemic.

In September 2020, her music career took a turn when she signed with Starfish Entertainment, a Cameroonian entertainment company based in the United Kingdom and involved in artist management. A month after signing this contract, Asaba released her first music video titled Yele.

In April 2022, Asaba won her first award at the Urban Jamz Awards under the category for Best Vocal Performance (Female). She was nominated alongside Charlotte Dipanda, Darina Victry and Rinyu.

In August 2022, she released her debut EP entitled Lighter, a 9-track EP with collaborations with Mr. Leo, Locko, Kameni, Mic Monsta and Cleo Grae.

== Discography ==
=== Eps ===
- Lighter EP (Starfish Entertainment) 2022
1. Lighter
2. Calling
3. For you
4. Love
5. Charge (feat. Mr. Leo )
6. Dilemma (feat. Locko )
7. One Love (feat. Kameni )
8. The Fingers (feat. Mic Monsta)
9. Eyes on the prize (feat. Cleo Grae)

=== Singles ===
- 2021 : Big Dreams
- 2021: Ten Years
- 2021: Yele
- 2021: Dodokido

=== Collaborations ===
- 2022: Charger feat. Mr Leo
- 2022: Dilemma feat. Locko
- 2022: One Love feat. Kameni
- 2022: Les Doigts feat. Mic Monsta
- 2022: Eyes on the prize feat. Cleo Grae

== See also ==
- List of Cameroonian artists
