= Mimie =

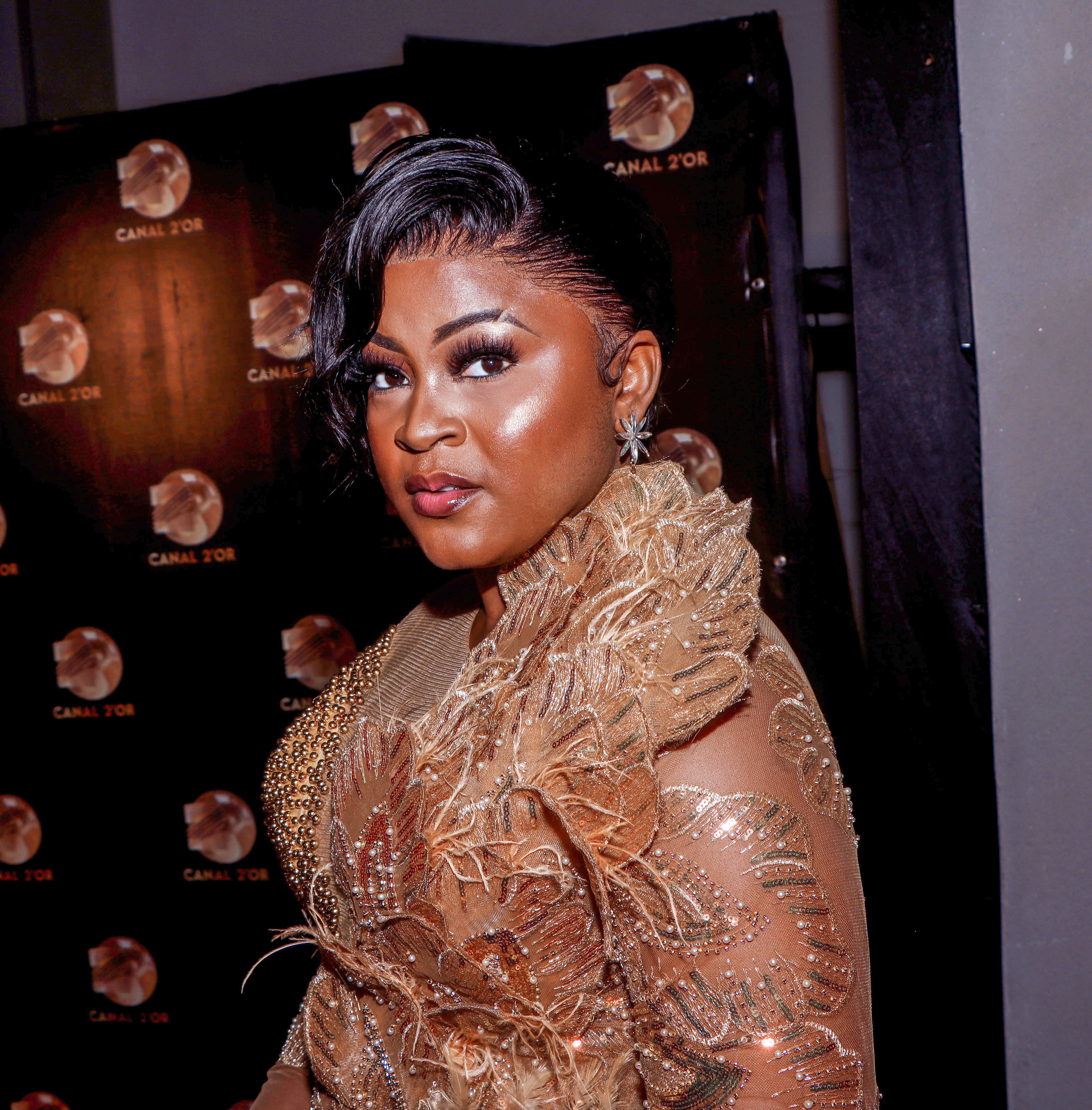

Background information
- Also known as: Melanie Ngoga
- Born: Mimie in 2021; January 11, 1991 (age 35); Douala, Cameroon
- Genres: Rock; Rhythm and blues; afro-pop; dance hall
- Occupations: Singer, actress, songwriter
- Instrument: Vocals
- Years active: 2014–present
- Label: Empire Company

Mélanie Ngoga, also known as Mimie, (born 11 January 1991) is a Cameroonian singer-songwriter and actress.

== Biography ==
=== Childhood and beginnings ===
Mimie was born in the city of Douala. She discovered her passion for music at the age of 9 and tried her hand at singing. From the age of 11, she performed songs at school fairs. After her secondary studies, she enrolled at the University of Douala where she obtained a Master's degree in corporate communication and marketing.

=== Musical career ===
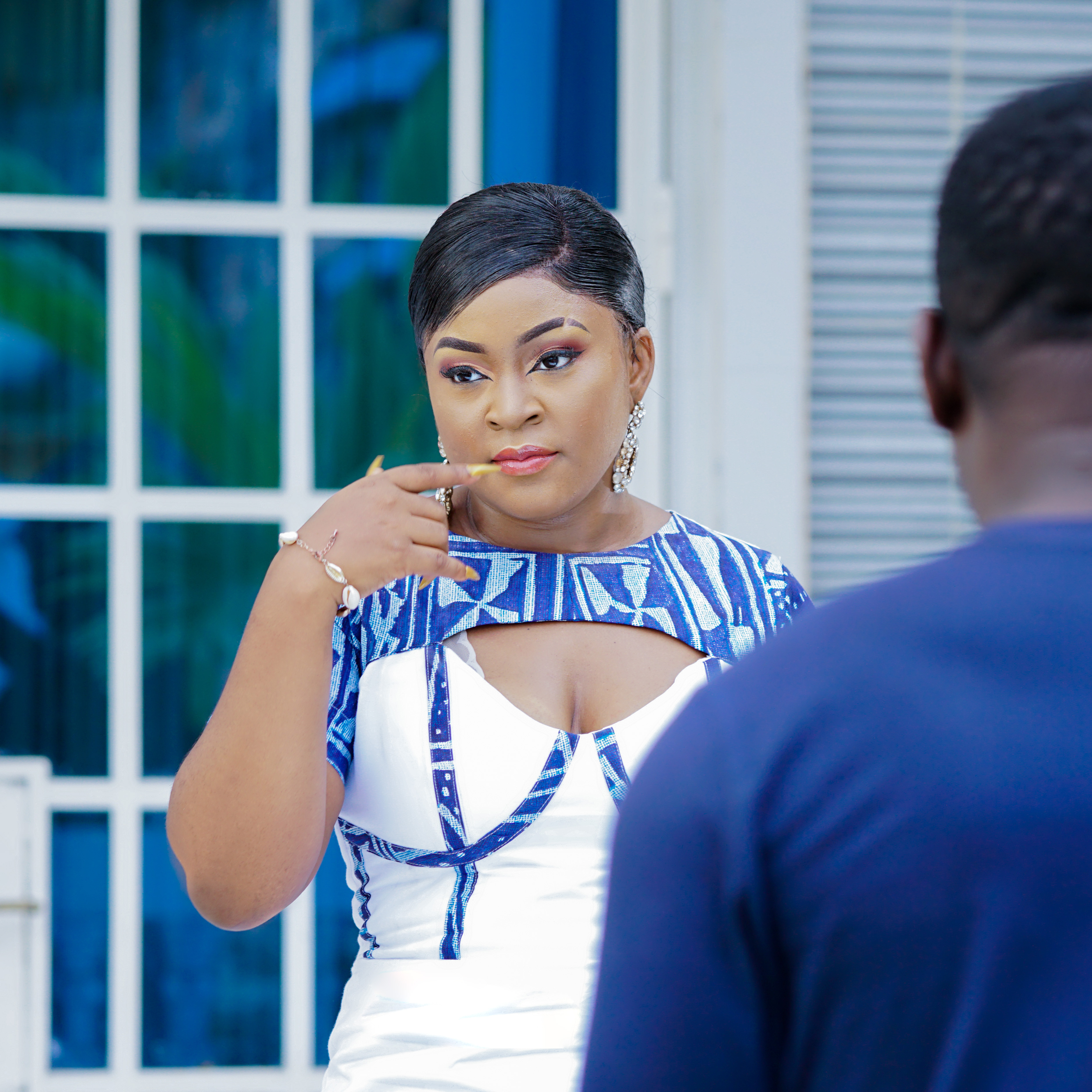
Filming of the Ma'aleh music video

She began her professional career with her first single, "Warriors," in 2014, but it wasn't until 2016 that she gained widespread public attention with the release of "Dance Fi You" followed by the now-classic "Dona". She was subsequently spotted by the label Empire Company of Pit Baccardi which signed her. She officially joined the label in 2017. By 2021, Mimie had released around ten singles and collaborated extensively with Cameroonian and international artists such as Shan'L, Dj Zoumanto, Ko-C and Locko.

In 2022, she left the Empire Company label after 5 years of collaboration.

=== Acting career ===
Mimie made her film debut in 2008 as an actress in the series Paradis, filmed in Buea and Limbe, where she played the role of a cabaret singer. In 2011, she landed the lead role in the series "Et Si C'était Vous" by Ousmane Stéphane and Sergio Marcello, which won the Audience Award at the Seattle International Film Festival in the United States. In 2019, she played the role of Jenifer Manzoula in the film Shenanigans, directed by Salem, alongside Muriel Blanche. She also appeared in Season 2 of the series Monsieur Madame by Ebenezer Kepombia released in July 2021. She participated in the casting of the series La Bataille des chéries by Ebenezer Kepombiain 2024.

== Discography ==
=== EP ===
- 2023: Soundsation

=== Singles ===
- 2014: Warriors
- 2016: Dance Fi You
- 2017: Dona
- 2018: Je M'en Fou
- 2018: Django
- 2019: Ten Ten
- 2019: Il Paraît with Shan'l
- 2020: J'avance
- 2020: Ma'aleh
- 2021: Faya with Locko
- 2022: Wolowoss
- 2023:Terminer
- 2024: Runaway
- 2024: Pas ta Vie

=== Collaborations ===
- Donner Donner from Magasco
- Do Like I Do by Dj Zoumanto
- Calling My Driver by Magasco
- Ndolo by Teddy Doherty and Inna Money

== Prizes and awards ==
- 2017: Nominated for the AFRIMA Awards in Nigeria in the category of best female singer from Central Africa.
- 2019: Balafon Music awards in the category "female voice of the year" (Nomination).
- 2019: African Talent Awards, Best Female Artist of the Year (Nomination)
- 2021: She is nominated for the Star Urban Hit Show competition organized by Orange.
- 2021: She won the Afro Urban Female Artist Award at the Canal d'Or 2021.
- 2025: She wins the award for traditional-inspired song at the Balafon Music Awards with the title Dedans.

== See also ==
- Ebenezer Kepombia
- Rigobert Tamwa
- Nabila (Cameroonian singer)
