= Sominex =

Trademarked name for several over the counter sleep aids

Sominex is the trademarked name for several over the counter sleep aids.

Different formulations of Sominex are available, depending upon the market. Both the US and UK formulations contain a significant dose of a first generation antihistamine with hypnotic properties.

In the United States, Sominex is marketed by Prestige Brands, sometimes under their subsidiary Medtech Products, Inc., and has as its active ingredient diphenhydramine hydrochloride. It is sometimes repackaged by Navajo Manufacturing Co., Inc. using the label Handy Solutions.

Diphenhydramine hydrochloride is also marketed as an antihistamine in Canada under the same name, and is only listed in the Canadian Agricultural database for equine use. However, a 2019 manual for counseling professionals in Canada included Sominex as a medicine to be used for the treatment of Parkinson's tremors and stiffness related to the condition in addition to its usage as an antihistamine.

In the UK, Sominex's active ingredient is promethazine hydrochloride. In 2024, the medicine is marketed by Teva UK Limited.

In India, the Sominex name is used by Lunar BioPharma Pvt. Ltd. to market a nutritional supplement intended to provide gastrointestinal relief. This version of Sominex is unrelated to the US and UK formulations; however, the US version repackaged by Navajo Manufacturing Co., Inc. is sold through GNH India.

Diphenhydramine and promethazine are both marketed by names other than Sominex for several indications including and besides their use as sleep aids. For example, diphenhydramine is sold under the brand name Benadryl as an antihistamine for use against allergies. Tylenol PM contains diphenhydramine in addition to acetaminophen for the purpose of inducing sleep and reducing pain and/or fever. Promethazine is marketed by the brand name Phenergan for use against allergy symptoms and motion sickness in the US, where a prescription for promethazine is required.

== History ==
=== United States ===
As early as the 1950s, Sominex was being promoted in television commercials. One ad spot featured the image of the sleeping pill tablet itself as a classic bouncing ball to follow the lyrics of their jingle, shown on the lower third of the screen. The commercial aired on a 1958 episode of the Arthur Murray Party.

In 1959, Sominex was noted as one of the major brands pushing patent medicines in television ads. Congressman John Blatnik had previously revealed that the manufacturer of Sominex, Pharmaceuticals, Inc., was selling lemon-flavored skim milk under the brand name of RDX, US¢7 product they sold for US$3.00 per bottle.

As early as 1960, Sominex was advertised in newspapers as having been hospital-tested.

In 1971, Sominex was a combination of scopolamine aminoxide hydrobromide, methapyrilene hydrochloride, and salicylamide, the last of which is noted as a pain killer, and comprised the largest part of the formula. This formula was still in use in 1975, 1977, and in 1982. A survey of elderly patients between 1978 and 1980 identified the formula as containing aminoxide-methapyrilene. It was produced by J.B. Williams Co., Inc., who also made Sominex 2.

The FDA requested that the National Cancer Institute speed up testing on over-the-counter drugs containing methapyrilene in 1978 as a result of a preliminary study showing tumors in test animals given the drug. The study combined methapyrilene and nitrite in high doses before giving them to rats who then developed liver tumors. In 1979, Health and Human Services (formerly Health, Education, and Welfare) Secretary Joseph A. Califano Jr. asked the FDA to remove such drugs, including Sominex, from the market. A statement from a Williams Co. spokesman in 1978 had indicated that Sominex had always contained methapyrilene.

By June 1979, J. B. Williams Co. was marketing Sominex with pyrilamine, a drug that had not been tested for possible carcinogenic effects and had last been deemed safe for humans in FDA testing completed in the 1940s. The FDA recommended banning the use of pyrilamine maleate, potassium bromide, sodium bromide, and scopolamine hydrobromide that same year unless they could be proven safe and effective; as a result, most sleep aid drug manufacturers changed their formulas to stop using it.

At some point before 1986, the Sominex formula had changed to diphenhydramine.

On January 17, 1989, the FDA approved the use of diphenhydramine hydrochloride and diphenhydramine citrate; by then, Sominex and Sominex 2 both used at least one of these two chemical compounds. The list of unapproved chemicals for use as a sleep aid included not only those recommended for banning in 1979, but several others including acetaminophen, aspirin, and passion flower extract.

Pharmaceutical manufacturer GlaxoSmithKline owned the Sominex brand in 2011, and announced their decision to divest it in April 2011. Prestige acquired Sominex, along with 16 other brand names, from GlaxoSmithKline in December 2011 for US$661.6 million.

==== Sominex 2 ====
In July 1975, the J. B. Williams Co. began marketing Sominex 2. On November 24, 1975, Attorney General Evelle J. Younger filed suit on behalf of the State of California against Williams Co., stating that the product did not warn against use by pregnant or nursing women or persons with asthma or COPD, nor did it notify consumers that it should not be used in conjunction with alcohol. The California Department of Health ordered Williams Co. to immediately cease sales of Sominex 2, which the company refused to do.

On December 2, 1975, the FDA ordered Sominex 2, which included diphenhydramine, to be removed from the market because the packaging was not child-resistant and the label did not include necessary warnings. They also stated that the use of diphenhydramine in an OTC drug was illegal. The FDA subsequently issued a recall for all outstanding Sominex 2 stock.

Television advertisements for Sominex 2 in 1983, manufactured by Beecham, made specific claims as to the effectiveness and physician preference for diphenhydramine.

=== United Kingdom ===
In the UK, Actavis marketed promethazine hydrochloride under the Sominex name. It was available at least as early as 1985 as an OTC hypnotic.

Actavis also marketed a product by the name of Sominex Herbal, an herbal sleep aid with three natural active ingredients: hops, valerian, and passion flower extracts.

Competing with GSK in the UK, Actavis ran an ad in 2010 for Sominex—their first television promotional campaign for the drug—in an attempt to increase the market share for their formulation of Sominex.

In 2018, Actavis withdrew Sominex from the market, according to the HPRA. In 2024, the medicine is marketed by Teva UK Limited.

== Recalls ==
The promethazine formula of Sominex was included in a recall issued in 2010 in the United Arab Emirates by Ministry of Health and Prevention Ministerial Decree No. 366 before receiving approval.

== Side-effects ==
=== Current U.S. formula ===
As a first-generation antihistamine, diphenhydramine is considered to be a sedative. Clinic trials of this class of drug versus a placebo have shown that the medication can affect attention, motor control, and memory.

It has been described as causing euphoria, hallucinations and psychosis, as well as tachycardia, blurred vision, and hyperactivity, among numerous other effects. Chronic use has been shown to cause dependence with large dosages.

=== Older U.S. formulas ===
In 1969, Washington Hospital Center discovered four patients in their care who were suffering from scopolamine toxicity, their symptoms mimicking schizophrenia. In 1964, Sominex use resulted in severe reactions for six patients who suffered hallucinations and disorientation.

In 1972, Sominex included methapyrilene, a drug known to cause nausea, vomiting, hypotension and central nervous system depression, among other effects, when taken in excess.

The formula used in 1975 included scopolamine, a hallucinogen rather than a sedative, which an FDA panel found to be an ineffective sleep aid at the manufacturer-recommended dosage as well as potentially deadly, with higher dosages possibly causing delirium and violence, and possibly leading to paralysis, coma, or death. The 306-page report compiled by 7 experts was presented to the FDA on December 4, 1975. Regular scopolamine use was also linked to the development of glaucoma.

In 1976, physostigmine was recommended as a treatment for toxicity of drugs with anticholinergic properties, including Sominex.

=== Current U.K. formula ===
In elderly people, the side effects have been shown to include dry or sticky lips, urinary issues, pale or dry skin, falling without cause, blurry vision, anxiety, tachycardia, or cardiac arrhythmia.

=== Adverse interactions ===
A case in Canada revealed that patients taking medication for chronic schizophrenia may experience tardive dyskinesia when taking Sominex in a manner other than prescribed.

When taking psilocybin, patients have reported increased blood pressure (but not hypertension).

== Effectiveness ==
=== Current U.S. standing ===
The American Academy of Sleep Medicine stated in 2018 that they could not recommend OTC sleep aids, specifically listing Sominex as an example, as there have not been enough studies regarding their effectiveness.

=== Historical U.S. standing ===
An investigation conducted by Dr. Anthony Kales, a leading U.S. sleep researcher at the time, into the efficacy of Sominex at least as early as 1971 found that Sominex did not cause test patients to fall asleep, nor did it have any effect on moderate to severe insomnia.

In 1971, FDA Commissioner Dr. Charles Edwards testified before Congress that Sominex, as it was then-formulated in the U.S., was no more effective than a placebo and noted that some users could experience hallucinations. He also stated that manufacturer advertisements exaggerated the benefits, use, and effectiveness of OTC drugs.

A U.S. Senate memorandum sent to Senator Gaylord Nelson in 1975 revealed that while over US$34 million had been spent on sleeping aids in 1974, Sominex and its competitor Compoz were shown to be ineffective when compared to placebos.

=== Historical U.K. standing ===
Promethazine has been determined at 20mg dosages to increase sleep duration through apparent direct effect on the brain rather than simply clearing congestion.

== Questions of misuse ==
=== United States ===
At a conference in 1972, it was acknowledged that people abused Sominex for hallucinogenic effects. Out of 13,787 cases reported of OTC drugs consumed by children under five in 1973, only 58 were ascribed to Sominex.

In 1986, a patient who had taken 1600 mg of Sominex 2 daily for a period of one month led his physicians to question whether additional caution should be taken with respect to abuse potential.

In 2005, diphenhydramine was included on a list of first-generation antihistamines that could be used to self-prescribe for mild anxiety and mild depression, with the caveat that self-medicating is only part of self-management of a medical issue.

An FAA report found that between 2012 and 2016, diphenhydramine was the most common pharmaceutical known to cause impairment detected in post-mortem toxicology tests performed on someone who may have been in charge of the aircraft at the time of a fatal plane crash, specifically naming both Benadryl and Sominex.

A 2016 recommendation regarding possibly misused over-the-counter medications indicated that the generic diphenhydramine had the potential to be over-utilized by patients and suggested changing it to a behind-the-counter class drug.

A 2023 Forbes report on the use of diphenhydramine for canine allergies listed several brand names, including Benadryl and Sominex, noting that veterinarians will use the medicine off-label to treat dog allergies but that it has not been FDA approved for use in non-humans.

Interviews presented in an October 2023 Netflix documentary (The Devil on Trial) covering the alleged demonic possession of Arne Johnson suggested that Sominex abuse may have caused the appearance of possession. An interview following the documentary's release with the medical director of UCI Health Sleep Medicine Services revealed that no studies have been done regarding the Sominex brand's possible long-term effects as it is only intended for short-term use.

=== United Kingdom ===
A study of deaths from 2000 to 2019 reported to the National Programme on Substance Abuse Deaths showed that 27.3% of deaths showing a first-generation antihistamine on the toxicology report indicated promethazine abuse. It questioned the apparent understanding that P classification antihistamines aren't dangerous while showing an increase in the number of deaths reported involving apparent abuse of those same drugs over the span of 20 years.
