= Sabrina (Cameroonian singer) =

Cameroonian singer-songwriter (born 2001)

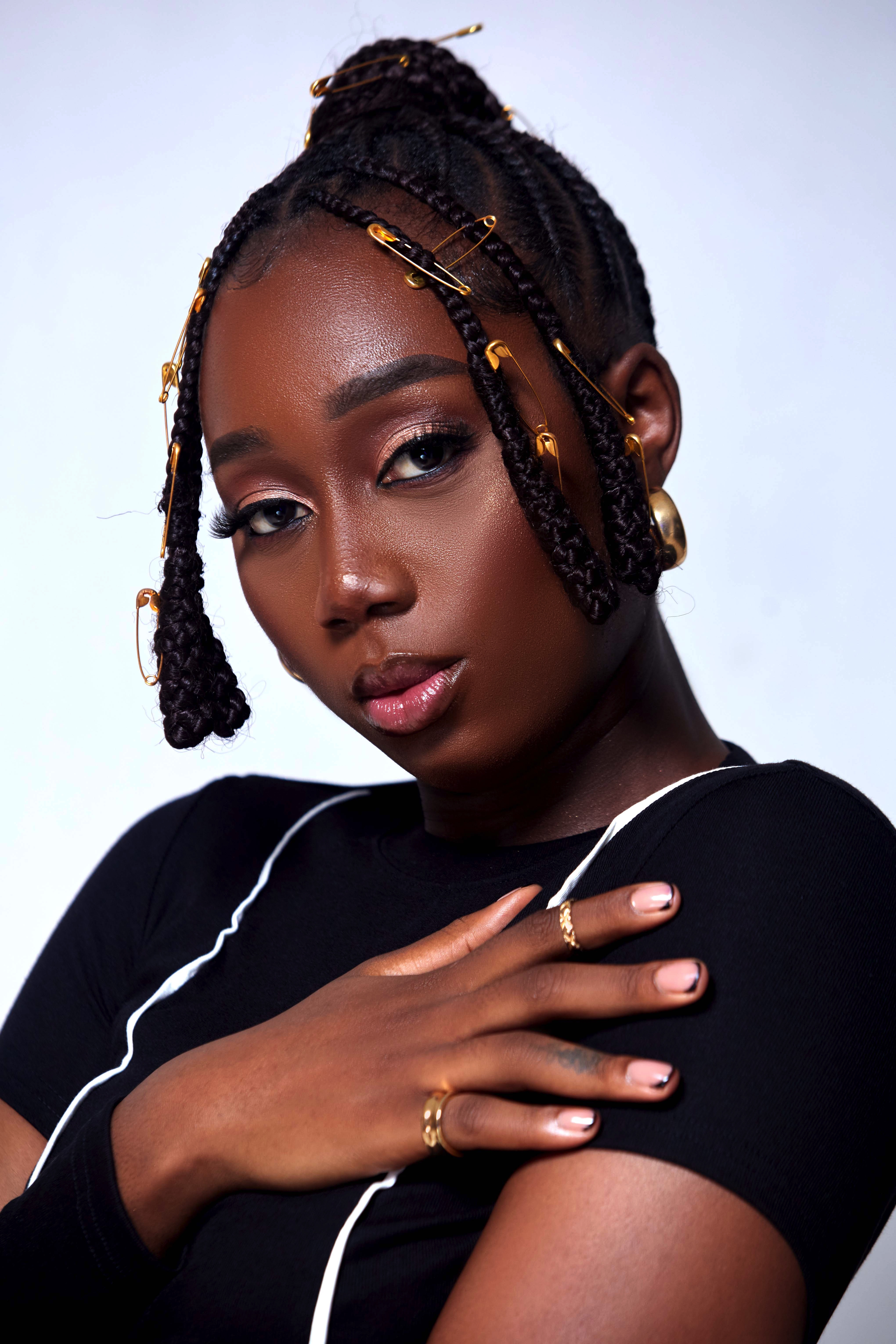
- Sabrina in 2022

Background information
- Born: Wamba Kuegou Sabrina Ruth; 6 November 2001 (age 24); Yaounde, Cameroon
- Genres: Afrobeats; Afropop; pop; electropop
- Occupations: Singer; songwriter
- Instruments: Vocals
- Years active: 2020–present
- Label: Afrobit Productions

YouTube information
- Channel: Sabrina
- Subscribers: 647 thousand
- Views: 122 million
- Last updated: 4 August 2026

Wamba Kuegou Sabrina Ruth (born 6 November 2001), is a Cameroonian Afropop Afrobeats singer and songwriter. She is an Afrobit Productions signed artist since 2019. On November 16, 2021, she released her debut Album Love Agenda. Her hit song Abele is the result of her collaboration with Koffi Olomide which will allow the young singer to reach a wider audience. This track is now ranked among the top ten collaborations of the Congolese artist.

"Five Star" became a major hit song and debuted at number 3 on the Spotify Top 50 chart in Luxembourg. The song reached number eleven on the hit charts on Boomplay in Nigeria, Gambia, and Kenya.

== Early life ==
Wamba Kuegou Sabrina Ruth was born on 6 November 2001 in Yaounde. She is originally from the West Region (Cameroon) where she spent part of her childhood with her grandparents. After obtaining her First Leaving School Certificate (FLSC), she joined her mother in Yaounde and it is in the English curriculum of the bilingual high school of Yaounde that she continued her secondary school.

== Career ==
She manifests her attraction to the world of music from a very young age. At the age of eight, she started to learn singing in the Bafoussam church choir. Then, she moved to Yaounde and it was at the bilingual high school that she developed her singing talents with some classmates. Distinguishing herself by her talent, sober and simple, she began to rub shoulders with the small studios of the capital. Shortly after, she was spotted by the label Afrobit Productions during a casting where she was unanimously accepted.

Her career began in 2020 with Afrobit Productions. Because of a repertoire that borrows as much from the variety as from the standards of Afropop music, the young singer managed to make a place for herself in the African musical landscape with an album called "Love Agenda" and several other singles. With sports playing a large role in her career, she has a dedicated gym provided by her label.

She collaborated in 2021 with Koffi Olomide on Abele, a title that made her known to the general public in Central Africa and West Africa.

In just a few years on the professional scene, Sabrina Love began to attract international attention. In February 2023, she was the only Cameroonian artist invited to Lagos, for the Soundcity MVP Awards Festival, alongside other Nigerian A-List artists such as Davido, Burna Boy and Tems.

In 2023 Sabrina is nominated for the first time at the Canal 2'Or in the category Best female Afro urban music artist.

== Discography ==
=== Albums ===
- 2021: Love Agenda

List of Albums with selected details
Title	Album details
Love Agenda	Released: 16 November 2021; Label: Afrobit Productions; Formats: Digital download, streaming

=== Extended plays ===
- 2024: Unstoppable

List of EPs, with selected details
Title	EP details
Unstoppable	Released: Jun 07, 2024; Label: Afrobit Productions; Format: Digital download, streaming

=== Singles ===
- 2020: A moi
- 2020: La Don Go
- 2020: Jaloux Ft. Yung Meagan
- 2021: Catastrophe
- 2021 : Abele Ft. Koffi Olomidé
- 2022: Maman Papa Ft. Dj Marina
- 2022: Validée
- 2022: Five Star Ft. Martin's
- 2023: Johnny
- 2023: On The Low
- 2023: No Time
- 2023: Sabrigang
- 2024: Bad Boys Ft. Guchi
- 2024: Pullover Ft. D Smoke
- 2024: My Africa
- 2024: Simplicity ft Prince Nico Mbarga

Other charted songs

Title	Year
"Validée"	2022
"Five Star"	2022
"Five Star"	2022
"Paper"	2023
"No Time"	2023
"No Time"	2023
"Sabrigang"	2023
"Bad Boys Ft. Guchi"	2024
"My Africa"	2024
"My Africa"	2024
"Sabrigang"	2024
"Pullover Ft. D Smoke"	2024
"Pullover Ft. D Smoke"	2024
"My Africa"	2024
"My Africa"	2024
"My Africa"	2025

== Awards and nominations ==
Year	Award ceremony	Award description	Nominee/Work	Result
2022	Criterium Africain	congratulations and encouragement	Sabrina	Recognition
2022	StarNews show by Orange	Orange Cameroon artist competition	Sabrina	Won
2022	Balafon Music Awards	Espoir Trace de l’année by Mutzig	Sabrina (Maman papa Ft. Dj marina)	Won
2022	The Public Vision Awards	Music Revelation of the Year	Sabrina	Won
2023	SGBC awards	Newcomer female artist, Best collaboration (Abele Ft. Koffi Olomide)	Sabrina	Nominated
2023	Soundcity MVP Awards Festival	Invitation	Sabrina	Invited
2023	Trace Awards & Festival	Invitation	Sabrina	Invited
2023	Canal 2'Or	Best Female afro Urban Artist	Sabrina	Nominated
2024	Balafon Music Awards	Female Voice of the Year, Best video clip (My Africa), Best cover version	Sabrina	Nominated
2025	Trace Awards	Best Newcomer	Sabrina	Nominated

== See also ==
- List of Cameroonian musicians
- List of Cameroonian artists
- Sabrina Spotify
- Sabrina YouTube
- Sabrina Apple Music
- Sabrina Boomplay
- Sabrina Deezer
