= Créol =

- Also known as: Créol la Diva, Créol Fantastik
- Born: Janice Aurore Moussitou Mackaya; August 16, 1989 (age 37); Libreville, Gabon
- Genres: R&B, Zouk, Dancehall
- Occupations: singer, songwriter
- Instrument: singing
- Years active: 2013–present

Janice Aurore Moussitou Mackaya, better known as Créol, (born 16 August 1989), is a Gabonese singer and songwriter.

== Biography ==
=== Early life ===
Creol was born on 16 August 1989 in Libreville into a family of artists. She is the daughter of musician Mackjoss, an icon of Gabonese music. Her maternal uncle, Ogoblo Boutchanga, is a member of the famous Massako orchestra. Her brother, Brake Makaya, also a singer, is quite well-known on the Gabonese music scene, notably having been revealed by the show The Voice Afrique francophone.

Créol took her first steps in music through Gospel as a singer in the choir "Les Anges ABC" of the Léon Mba national high school.

=== Career ===
Créol was discovered in 2013 thanks to Gabonese reggae artist Bubal Bu Kombil, who believed in her and told her early on that she had "the knack for success." Bubal subsequently invited her to join him on the song "Dans Ma Timbel", the young singer's first studio project. Her second single, titled "Ludo" and written by her brother Brake, enjoyed some success and allowed the singer to gain greater recognition and be noticed by producer Edgard Yonkeu, who signed her to his label Direct Prod.

Créol was truly propelled onto the national and international scene in 2017 thanks to the song Bonobo in collaboration with Shan'L, which was a real success with more than ten million views on YouTube.

In 2018, she changed her stage name and went by Créol rather than Créole and released the single VIP. The same year, a few months after the release of this track, she left the Direct Prod label and parted ways with her producer and mentor Edgard Yonkeu.

Now working under her own label, Fantastik, Créol released a string of hits between 2019 and 2021, the most popular of which are "Bougie 144" with 2MJ and BIG BOSS J.O.J.O, "Ova" with Zion Stylei, H20, and Waka Waka. These songs earned her several awards and accolades. Créol was nominated for African Talent Awards in the Female Artist of the Year category in 2019 and 2020. She did not win, but she did win the Audience Choice Award in 2020, beating out Fatoumata Diawara, the jury's choice, who won the prize.

In February 2021, she won four awards at the "Bweli Tribe Awards" in Libreville, including Best Female Artist, Hit of the Year and Artist of the Year.

In 2021, the Gabonese singer spent a long time in Côte d'ivoire during which she performed on many stages in West Africa, notably in Ivory Coast, Mali and Senegal. Among other things, she participated in the show organized for the funeral of former Ivorian Prime Minister Hamed Bakayoko.

=== Personal life ===
Créol is the mother of a boy named Jérémie born in 2006.

=== Controversy ===
Créol has been criticized for her look, language, and music, which are regularly described as "provocative," "crude," and "vulgar." The lyrics of her songs are mostly sexually suggestive. Faced with this criticism, the singer regularly asserts her right to speak about sexuality and sensuality without taboo and affirms that she makes music for an adult audience.

== Discography ==
=== Singles ===
- 2013: Dans ma Timbel with Bubal Bu Kombil
- 2013: Ludo
- 2016: Serre-moi contre toi with Arielle T
- 2017: A tes côtés
- 2017: BONOBO with Shan'L
- 2018: VIP
- 2018: H20
- 2019: Recommence
- 2019: Ova with Zyon Stylei
- 2020: Waka Waka
- 2020: Bougie 144 with 2MJ & BIG BOSS J.O.J.O
- 2021: Pimenté
- 2021: Gabon

=== Participations ===
- 2021: Tchobo de J-Rio

== Prix et Récompenses ==
Year	Prize	Category	Result
2019	African Talent Awards	Best Female Artist of the Year	Nomination
2020	African Talent Awards	Best Female Artist of the Year	Nomination
2020	Bweli Tribe Awards	Best female artist	Winner
2020	Bweli Tribe Awards	Best collaboration	Winner
2020	Bweli Tribe Awards	Best hit of the year	Winner
2020	Bweli Tribe Awards	Artist of the Year	Winner
