= Shan'L =

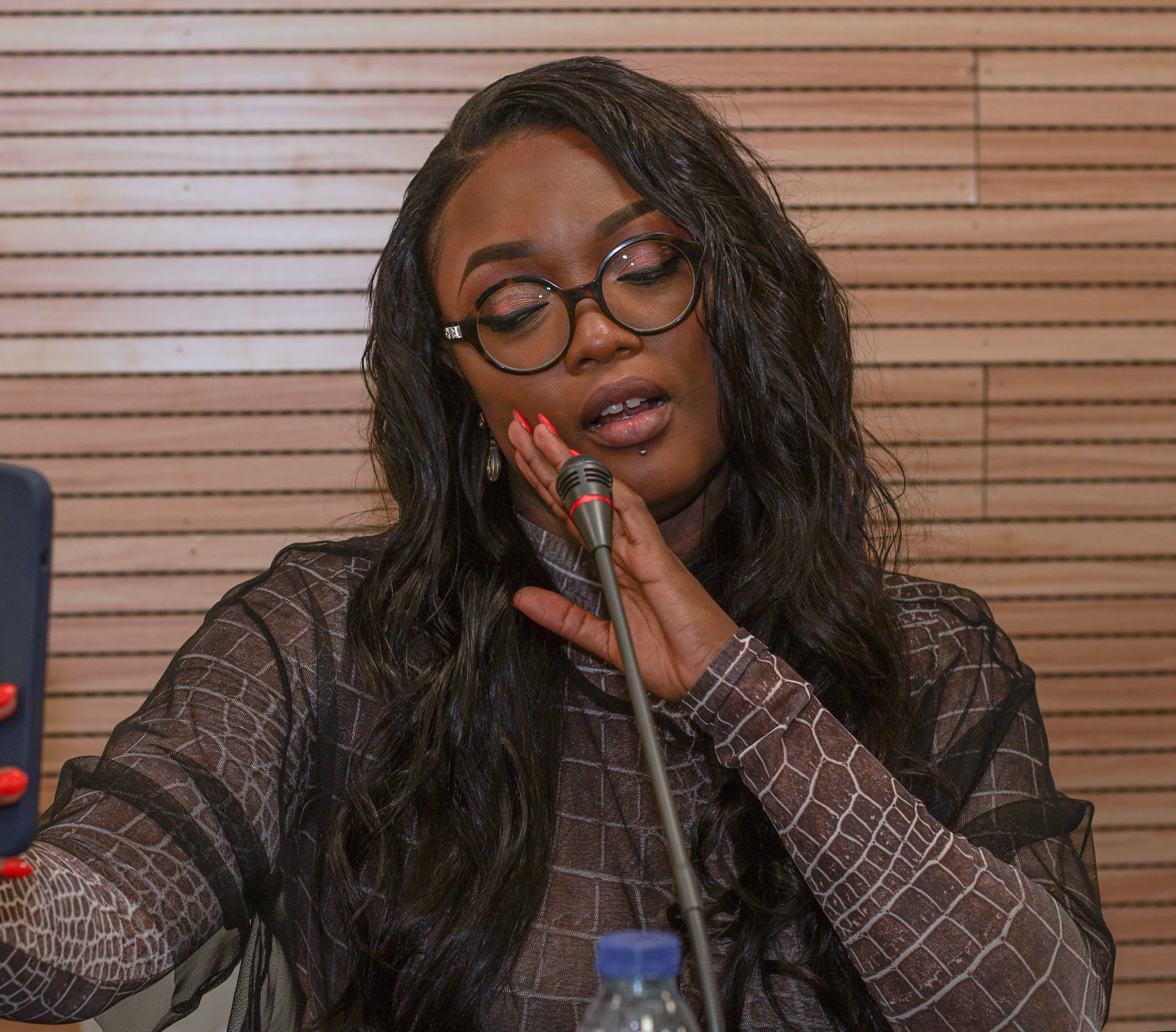

Background information
- Also known as: La Kinda, la panthère.
- Born: Channelle Lekogo; February 6, 1989 (age 37); Libreville, Gabon
- Genres: R&B, Afropop
- Instrument: Vocals
- Years active: 2012–present
- Labels: Direct Prod, Sony Music Entertainment, Keyzit

Channelle Lekogo, also known as Shan'L, (born 6 February 1989) is a Gabonese singer and songwriter.

Shan'L has released two studio albums and around ten singles. Her first album, titled Shan’l Is My Name, was released in 2015 and her second album Eklektik 2.0 was released in 2020. Shan'l has been signed to Sony Music Entertainment Côte d'Ivoire since July 2019 then the label in 2024.

Shan'L has received numerous awards and distinctions, including Best Artist from Central Africa at the All Africa Music Awards in 2019 and at the Primud in 2018 and 2020.

== Biography ==
=== Childhood and early career ===
Shan'L was born on 6 February 1989 in Gabon. She is originally from the province of Haut-Ogooué. She made her musical debut in the Les Anges ABC choir at the Lycée National Léon Mba in Libreville where she attended secondary school from 6th grade to her final year. She served as lead vocalist and choreographer in the school choir until she obtained her baccalaureate.

In 2011, she participated in the Miss Gabon beauty pageant. She reached the final, but did not win the competition. During the final of this competition, while singing Happy Birthday to a member of the jury, her performance was noticed and she was spotted by the Cameroonian-born producer Edgard Yonkeu who took her under his wing and brought her to the label Direct Prod.

The Gabonese singer had a romantic relationship with Ibrahim Tchicaya for seven years. A relationship in which she gave birth to a child, but Ibrahim Tchicaya's marriage to another woman created a controversy on social media, highlighting the violence the singer suffered.

=== Career ===
Shan'L was discovered in 2013 through the zouk track L'aveu in duet with the Gabonese singer Arielle T. She then multiplied collaborations with other Gabonese artists including Tina, J-Rio, FANG among others.

In 2015, she won the Airtel Trace Music Star competition in Gabon. She was among the 13 national finalists who participated in the pan-African final held in Kenya in April 2015, under the patronage of American singer Akon.

A few months later, in August 2015 she released her debut album of 17 tracks entitled Shan’L is my name. It includes the tracks Où est le gars, Camisolé, Je me bats pour réussir and Better Think.

It was the song "Tchizambengue", which was released in 2018, that propelled her onto the international stage. In it, the singer praises "Tchiza" (mistresses, husband stealers). The song shocked the public and generated considerable controversy. The music video features Cameroonian singer Nathalie Koah and Miss Gabon 2013 , Ruth Jennifer Ondo Mouchita. The song was a huge success, accumulating over 10 million views on YouTube in just a few months. Since then, she has released a string of hit singles, including "C'est Pas Les Gbés Gbés Gbés", "Sérré serré", and "Poupish", among others.

In 2020, Shan'l was a finalist in the pan-African RFI Discovery Prize competition. She won the public vote, but finished in second place, behind Congolese singer Young Ace Wayé, winner of the competition.

In December 2020, she released Eklektik 2.0, a 24-track album featuring her hit singles including Tchizambengue, Yayayobé and Okokè. It also includes the track Où est le mariage in collaboration with Congolese singer Fally Ipupa.

She has ventured into cinema and took on the role of a battered woman in season 2 of the series Eki, la famille c'est secret.

== Discography ==
=== Albums ===
- 2015: Shan’l Is My Name
- 2020: Eklektik 2.0
- 2026: Résilience

=== Singles ===
- 2015: Je me bats pour réussir
- 2015: Better Think
- 2015: Où est le gars
- 2015: Camisolé
- 2016: My Love
- 2017: Je te suivrais avec Rico
- 2017: Love It with Magasco
- 2017: Maria
- 2018: Tchizambengue
- 2018: Serré Serré
- 2019: C'est Pas Les Gbés Gbés Gbés
- 2019: Poupish
- 2019: Yayayobé
- 2020: Où est le mariage with Fally Ipupa
- 2020: Je veux faire l'amour
- 2021: Okokè

=== Collaborations ===
- 2012: Dormir seul de F.A.N.G
- 2012: L'aveu de Arielle T
- 2014: Tu vas te Waz de J-Rio
- 2017: Bonobo by Créol
- 2020: Il paraît from Mimie
- 2021: Pehi Sair de Shado Chris

== Prizes and Awards ==
- 2018: Prix International des Musiques Urbaines et du Coupé-décalé (PRIMUD), Meilleure artiste d’Afrique Centrale
- 2018: African Musik Magazine Awards (AFRIMMA), Meilleure artiste d’Afrique Centrale (Nomination)
- 2019: Meilleure artiste d'Afrique centrale, All Africa Music Awards (AFRIMA)
- 2020: Meilleure artiste d’Afrique Centrale, (PRIMUD)
- 2020: African Musik Magazine Awards (AFRIMMA), Meilleure artiste d’Afrique Centrale (Nomination)
- 2020: Meilleure artiste féminine aux Kotas (The Gabonese Awards of the year)
- 2021: Meilleur artiste féminine d'Afrique centrale au All African Music Awards
- 2021: Meilleur collaboration de l'année avec le titre (où est le mariage) en feat avec le chanteur congolais Fally Ipupa (Nomination)
- 2021: Meilleur artiste francophone au (Canal D'or) Nomination.
