= Eko International Film Festival =

Film festival in Lagos

- Location: Lagos
- Country: Nigeria
- Years active: 2010 - present
- Founded: 2009
- Founders: Hope Obioma Opara

The annual Eko International Film Festival (EKOIFF) is an international film festival held in Lagos, Nigeria. The Eko International Film Festival was founded and established in 2009 by Hope Obioma Opara, the CEO of Supple Communications Limited, under which the festival is held. He is also the publisher of Supple magazine, an African cinema and culture journal that features film previews, reviews, and interviews. The purpose of the Eko International Film Festival is to develop tourism in Nigeria by promoting appreciation of the arts and culture through the motion picture arts and sciences.

== Eko International Film Festival Events ==
The first edition took place in the summer of 2010 in the megacity of Lagos, with filmmakers from Nigeria, Kenya, the United Kingdom, Germany, France, Spain, and the United States. The subsequent editions took place in the Silverbird Galleria's Silverbird Cinemas on Victoria Island, Lagos. until now

The festival accepts films in the 6 categories listed below:

Feature Film, Short Film, Fiction, Documentaries, Short Documentaries and Indigenous Film.

The Inaugural Edition

The maiden edition was held between the 7th and 12 July in 2010 at the Genesis Deluxe Cinemas of The Palms in Lekki, Lagos

2011 Eko International Film festival

The second edition of Eko International Film festival (EKOIFF), was held from July 9 through 14, 2011. This edition of Eko International film Festival was themed ‘‘Nollywood -maximizing the Nigerian Film Industry”.

2015 Eko International Film festival

Feature Film Category Award
Award	Winner
Best feature film	God forgive us by Michael Bachochin (USA)
Best Nigerian Film	Heavens Hell by Katung Direkta Aduwak (Nigeria)
Best Actor	Jeffery Kissoon from the film Ham & The Piper (Uk)
Best Actress	Bimbo Akintola from the film Heavens Hell (Nigeria)
Best Supporting Actor	Chumani Pan from the film Silverain (Ghana)
Best Supporting Actress	Nse Ikpe Etim from the film Heavens Hell (Nigeria)

Documentary Award Category
Award	Winner
Best Documentary	Under the Palaver Tree by Clair Savary (France)

Indigenous Film Award
Award	Winner
Best Indigenous Film	Bogiri Olanu by Taiwo Samuel (Nigeria)
Best Actor Indigenous	Tayo Afolayan from the film Alaaru (Nigeria)
Best Actress Indigenous	Fatia Balogun from the film Bogiri Olanu (Nigeria)

Short Film Category Award
Award	Winner
Best Short Film	Awaiting Lazarus by Duke Orok (UK/Nigeria)
Best Nigeria Short Film	Zyra by Douglas Enogieru (Nigeria)
Best Actor Short Film	Michael Peters from the film Awaiting Lazarus (UK/Nigeria)
Best Actress Short Film	Abigail Ocheiri from the short film Deranged (Nigeria)

Student Animation Film Award
Award	Winner
Best Student Film Animation	Tatiana by Sadiq Sadiq (Nigeria)
Outstanding Young Actor	Somadina Adinma from the film Miss Teacher (Nigeria)
Outstanding Young Actress	Treasure Obasi from the film Heavens Hell (Nigeria)

2018 Eko International Film Festival

Filmmakers, cinema aficionados, and students from Nigeria and beyond attended daily film screenings, masterclasses, and panel discussions at the 8th edition, which took place from March 5 to 10, 2018.

2019 Eko International Film festival

The festivals ninth edition, featured over 208 films from around the world, with the United States of America topping the list with 58 films. Nigeria has 43, Canada has 30, the United Kingdom has 19, Germany has 13, France has 11, India has ten, Russia has seven, Australia and Italy each have six, and Brazil has only five. Short narratives, feature films, documentaries, and African indigenous films make up this collection.

2020 Eko International Film festival

Awards
Award	Winner
Best Student Film Animation	Tatiana by Sadiq Sadiq (Nigeria)
Outstanding Young Actor	Somadina Adinma from the film Miss Teacher (Nigeria)
Outstanding Young Actress	Treasure Obasi from the film Heavens Hell (Nigeria)
Best Feature Film	The Real Exorcist (Japan
Best Nigerian Film	SEVEN by Tosin Igho
Best Actor	Richard Mofe Damijo in SEVEN (Nigeria)
Best Actress	Elvina Ibru in Bling Lagosians (Nigeria)
Best Supporting Actor	Daddy Showkey from the movie SEVEN 9nigeria)
Best Supporting Actress	Rin Kijima from the movie The real Exorcist (Japan)
Best Feature Documentary Film	Metroplastic Madness by Atsuko Quirk, Debby Lee Cohen (USA)
Best Short Documentary Film	Road Trip Sao Tome by Andreas & Leah Rohner (CAlgary, Canada), Bastian Caspar (Cologne, Germany), Christian Fausel (Munich, Germany), Denis Trumbach (Moschheim, Germany
Best indigenous Film	IBI: The Birth by Seyi Alabi (Nigerian)
Best Nigeria Short Film	Arabida by Olumense Omonjahio (Nigeria)

2021 Eko International Film Festival

Celebrating a decade the festival was celebrated in glam style and received entries from over 55 countries around the world for the period of March 8 to 12, 2021. The United States Consulate in Nigeria, Makido Film Austria, the Polish Embassy in Nigeria, the Niger State Government (Niger State Book and other Intellectual Resources Development Agency, Multichoice Nigeria Ltd, Nexim Bank and Bank of Industry (BOI), the Nigeria Film and Video Censors Board (NFVCB), and the Silverbird Group (Silverb) have all contributed to the film festival.

Awards
Award	Winner
Best Feature Film	The Loft House by Ferdinand Gernandt (South Africa)
Best Nigerian film	Utonwa (bonded by blood) by Johnpaul Nwanganga (Nigeria)
Best Actor Feature Film	Eugene Jensen from the movie The Loft House (South Africa)
Best Actress Feature Film	Clarion Chukwura from the Movie Efunsetan Aniwura (Nigeria)
Best Supporting Actor Feature Film	Christian Leger Dah from the movie The Republic of the Corruption (Burkina Faso)
Best Supporting Actress Feature Film	Mary Igwe from the movie Utonwa (bonded by blood) (Nigeria)
Best Feature Documentary Film	Sky Blossom: Diaries of the Next Greatest Generation by Richard Lui (USA)
Best Short Documentary Film	Poland: Europes Garbage Dump by Maciej Kuciel and Patrycja Dziecio-mokwa (Poland)
Best Indigenous Film	Efunsetan Aniwura by Joshua Ojo (Nigeria)
Best Short Film	Dark Moon by Michael "Micl Snr" Norman (South Africa)
Best Nigeria Short Film	Brotherly by Best Okoduwa (Nigeria)
Best Actor Short Film	Duke Elvis from the movie Brotherly (Nigeria)
Best Actress Short Film	Zera Udofia from the movie Omowunmi (Nigeria)
Best Animation Film	The Last Page of Summer by Tim Ross (USA)
Best Short Animation Film	Bolero Station by Rolf Bronnimann (Switzerland)
