= Chumani Pan =

South African actor

- Born: Chumani Pan; 30 August 1985 (age 41); Eastern Cape, South Africa
- Education: City Varsity film and Multimedia School
- Occupation: Actor
- Years active: 2006–present
- Height: 1.63 m (5 ft 4 in)

Chumani Pan (born 30 August 1985) is a South African actor. He is best known for the roles in the television serials such as; Ashes to Ashes, Montana, 'woman king' and Shooting Stars.

== Personal life ==
Chumani Pan was born on 30 August 1985 in Eastern Cape, in the Soto location in Mooiplaas, South Africa. He studied acting at City Varsity film and Multimedia School.

== Career ==
In 2007, he made his television debut with the role "Loop-en-val Radebe" in the e.tv drama series Shooting Stars and appeared in all three seasons of the show until 2010. Meanwhile, he made a cameo role in an episode of the SABC2 sitcom Stokvel in 2007. In 2012, he made the lead role "Malusi" in the SABC1 drama serial Montana. Then in 2010, he appeared in the kykNET sitcom Deeltitel Dames. In 2012, he reprised the role in the second season as well. In the same year, he appeared in the Mzansi Magic telenovela iNkaba as the "Investigating Agent".

In 2013, he played a guest role in another kykNET period drama serial Donkerland. Then in 2014, he joined with the SABC1 youth drama serial Loxion Lyric. In 2015, he joined with the e.tv telenovela Ashes to Ashes and played the role as "Monwabisi Namane" in first two seasons. In 2016, he made a recurring role as "Mayenzeke" in the e.tv drama serial The Kingdom - uKhakhayi. In the following year, he played the role "Ntando" in the Mzansi Magic supernatural drama Igazi. Then he joined with the Mzansi Magic drama series Isithembiso to play the recurring role "Whitey".

In 2020, he appeared in three television serials: as "Jonas" in the soapie Generations, as "Luxolo Dladla" in the kykNET drama series Projek Dina, and then as "a doctor" in the SABC3 medical drama serial Vutha. Then in 2021, he joined with 1Magic drama Wounds with the role "Sonwabo Dube" and SABC2 telenovela Die Sentrum with the role "Muzi Gadluma". Apart from them, he made a guest role in an episode of the first season of SABC2 police procedural serial The Docket.

In 2015, he acted in the Ghanaian pan-African film Silver Rain with the role "Mark". For his role, he won the award for Best Supporting Actor at the 11th Africa Movie Academy Awards (AMAA) and nominated at the Eko International Film Festival. Apart from that, he also made supportive roles in the films such as Special Forces UK, Ella's Secret, I Now Pronounce You Black and White, End Game and Bakgat 3. Apart from cinema and television, he also made sporadic appearances in the theatre with the plays such as; Career Awareness and Destiny of Stone.

== Filmography ==
Year	Film	Role	Genre	Ref.
2007	Shooting Stars	Loop-en-val Radebe	TV series	
2007	Stokvel	Guest role	TV series	
2008	Special Forces Heroes	Foday Kelley	TV series documentary	
2009	Endgame	Youth #1 - Shabeen	Film	
2009	Ella's Mystery	Ben	TV movie	
2009	Montana	Malusi Ntshinga	TV series	
2010	Themba	Zakes	Film	
2010	Free Willy: Escape from Pirate's Cove	Gate Guard	Video	
2010	I Now Pronounce You Black and White	Patrick Muyambwo	Film	
2012	iNkaba	Investigating Agent	TV series	
2013	Donkerland	Gerald	TV series	
2013	The Road Warrior	Mzi Thulo	Short film	
2013	Bakgat! tot die mag 3	Vusi	Film	
2014	Loxion Lyric	Brian	TV series	
2015	Ashes to Ashes	Monwabisi Namane	TV series	
2015	Silver Rain	Mark	Film	
2017	Igazi	Ntando	TV series	
2017	Isithembiso	Whitey	TV series	
2016	The Kingdom	Mayenzeke	TV series	
2018	The Docket	Guest role	TV series	
2019	Shadow	Richard	TV series	
2020	Generations	Jonas	TV series	
2020	Vutha	Dr Bhengu	TV series	
2020	Projek Dina	Luxolo Dladla	TV series 33 episodes	
2021	Wounds	Sonwabo Dube	TV series	
2021	Die Sentrum	Muzi Gadluma	TV series	
2021	Atlantis	Captain Grootboom	Film	
2022	Blood & Water	Sting	TV Series 3 episodes	
2022	The Woman King	Abomey Father	Drama	
