= MC Charlene =

Charlene Egbe
- Born: April 14, 1992 (age 33); Mamfe, Cameroon
- Other names: MC Charlene.
- Occupations: Events Compere, Chef.
- Website: www.charleneofficial.com

Charlene Ebai-Ebi Egbe (born April 14, 1992) porpularly known as Mc Charlene is a Cameroonian-Norwegian events compere. In 2019 she was unveiled as the MC of the year at the Scandinavia Africa Music Award (SAMA) and she emerged as the Best MC at the Muzikol Music Awards (MUMA) in 2020. She is one of few notable female MCs in Norway.

== Career ==
MC Charlene began her career as a social worker, after obtaining a bachelor's degree in social work from Høgskulen på Vestlandet. She also became a certified chef from Sandsli videregående skole, before founding her sports brand, Sweat Like This Fitness.

In 2016, MC Charlene had her first gig as a Master of Ceremony and in 2022, she signed with Cole Management company, a management firm.

In October 2024, MC Charlene received the award for MC of the Year at the Global African Diaspora Awards organized by Diaspora Glitz Magazine in England.
