= Blanche Bailly =

Cameroonian singer

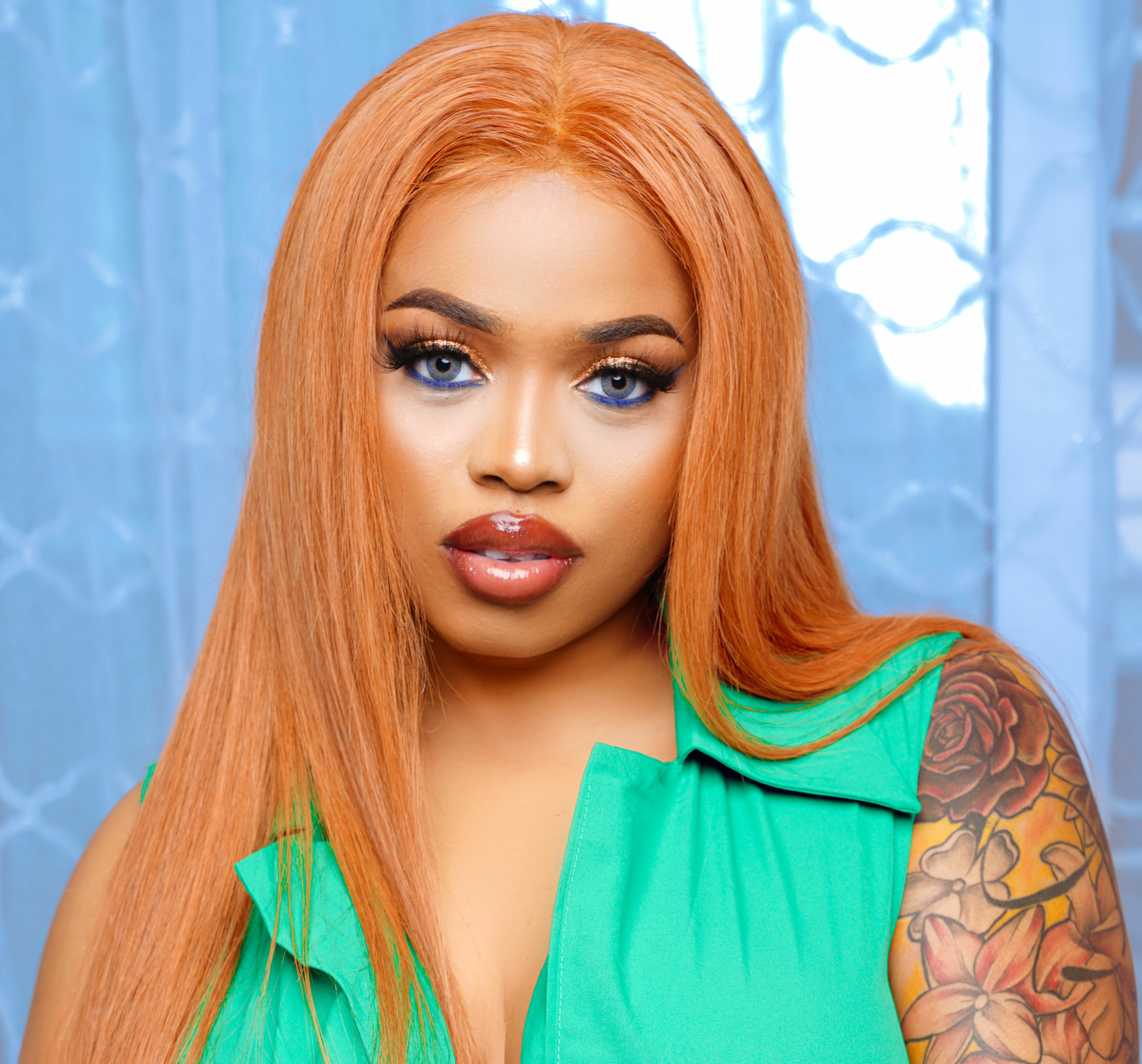
- Blanche Bailly in 2021
- Born: Tatah Larinatte Bailly; 8 August 1994 (age 32); Kumba, Cameroon
- Education: Baptist Secondary School
- Occupations: Singer, actress, songwriter
- Years active: 2015–present

Bailly Larinette Tatah (born 8 August 1995), known professionally as Blanche Bailly is a Cameroonian singer, songwriter, and actress. She gained initial recognition following the release of her debut single ‘Kam We Stay’ in August 2016.

She made her acting debut in the movie The Kujus Again, which was released in April 2023, and directed by Biodun Stephen.

== Early life and education ==
Born in Kumba in the South West Region of Cameroon into a religious family, Blanche attended primary school at Sacred Heart Kumba South-West region and later did part of her secondary education at Baptist Secondary School Kang Barombi and Diligent Bilingual College- Kumba before relocating to France at age 12 with her family where she continued her studies. While in France, she decided to pursue her dream of becoming a stage performer and recording artist. Her journey encountered various challenges, including rejections and difficulties. Eventually, she chose to relocate to the UK in pursuit of her aspirations.

== Career ==
During her time in the UK, she encountered a Cameroonian artist who arranged her first studio session. At the time, this artist was known by the stage name "Swagger Queen". By 2015, she debuted her first single titled "Killa", which was produced by Ayo Beats. She released "‘Kam we stay" in 2016 produced by Cameroonian-based producer Philbillbeatz.

Following the release of the single, Blanche decided to return to her home country and further engage with the industry there. With the success of ‘Kam we stay’, In 2017, Blanche collaborated once more with Philbillbeatz on another single she composed, titled "Mimbayeur", which features rapper Minks. With the success of the single which gained over 5 million views on YouTube.

She was nominated for Best Female Central African Artist at the AFRIMA, Best Urban and Revelation of the Year at Canal D’or, and won Revelation of the Year at the Balafon Music Awards in 2016. In October 2018, Blanche Bailly joined artists like Mr. Leo, Daphné, Minks, Pit Barccardi, Magasco, and a host of others in a peace song; We Need Peace by Salatiel for the ongoing conflict in the Anglophone regions of Cameroon.

== Acting career ==
In addition to her musical career, Blanche has been involved in acting, starring in the movie "The Kujus Again", released in 2023. She played the role of an MC/Artist in this movie.

== Personal life ==
Blanche Bailly was arrested in October 2022 for an alleged refrigerator theft by the Police Force, It was later confirmed that she had purchased the fridge from someone who was not the owner in Buea. Subsequently, police officers, who were already investigating the case, received a tip-off that Bailly was planning to move the fridge to Douala. An order was issued for her arrest.

== Discography ==
Studio albums

- Authentik (2023)

Singles

- Mes Respects (2020)
- Le Feu (2023)
- Dieu Donné (2023)
- OMG ft Bnxn (2023)
- Mine (2023)
- Dou Dou (2023 )
- Aimer (2023)
- Banga (2023)

== Filmography ==
Film
| Year | Title | Role | Notes |
|---|---|---|---|
| 2023 | The Kujus Again | Bar MC Artist | Drama |

== Award and nominations ==
| Year | Award | Category | Recipient | Result |
|---|---|---|---|---|
| 2018 | All Africa Music Awards | Best Female artist | Herself | Nominated |
| 2018 | The Canal D’or Awards | Best Urban and Revelation of the year | Herself | Nominated |

== See also ==
living people

- List of Cameroonian Actors
- Cinema of Cameroon
