= Trial of Arne Cheyenne Johnson =

American court case alleging demonic possession

"Devil Made Me Do It" case
- Court: Connecticut Superior Court
- Decided: November 25, 1981
- Verdict: Found guilty of first degree manslaughter charge and sentenced to 10 to 20 years prison, serving 5 for good behavior.
- Defendant: Arne Cheyenne Johnson
- Citation: https://archives.law.virginia.edu/dengrove/writeup/arne-cheyenne-johnson

The trial of Arne Cheyenne Johnson, also known as the "Devil Made Me Do It" case, is the first known court case in the United States in which the defense sought to prove innocence based upon the claim of demonic possession and denial of personal responsibility for the crime. On November 24, 1981, in Brookfield, Connecticut, Arne Cheyenne Johnson was convicted of first-degree manslaughter for the killing of his landlord, Alan Bono.

According to testimony by the Glatzel family, 12-year-old David Glatzel allegedly had played host to a demon. After witnessing a number of increasingly ominous occurrences involving David, his family, exhausted and terrified, decided to enlist the aid of Ed and Lorraine Warren in a last-ditch effort to "cure" the child. The Glatzel family, along with the Warrens, then proceeded to have multiple priests petition the Catholic Church to have a formal exorcism performed on David. The process continued for several days, concluding when, according to those present, a demon fled the child's body and took up residence within Johnson. These events were documented in the book The Devil in Connecticut by Gerald Brittle.

Several months later, Johnson killed his landlord during a party. His defense lawyer argued in court that he was possessed, but the judge ruled that such a defense could never be proven and was therefore infeasible in a court of law. Johnson was subsequently convicted, though he served only five years behind bars of a 10 to 20-year sentence.

The trial attracted media attention from around the world and has obtained a level of notoriety due to numerous depictions of the events in literature and television. A live-action TV prequel titled Where Demons Dwell was released on August 31, 2006. The story was later made into a film adaptation titled The Conjuring: The Devil Made Me Do It (2021), and was the subject of a documentary, The Devil on Trial, in 2023.

== Background ==
Arne Cheyenne Johnson and Debbie Glatzel provided firsthand accounts for the version of events depicted in Discovery Channel's A Haunting, episode "Where Demons Dwell". They said their father was an eyewitness to demonic possession. Both Johnson and Debbie were adamant in their support of the Warrens' recollection of events. They asserted that paranormal activity began after they went to clean up a rental property they had just acquired. David recalled an old man suddenly appeared, pushing and terrifying him. The couple initially thought David was using the old man as an excuse to avoid cleaning, but David informed them that the old man had vowed to harm the Glatzels if they moved into the rental home. David's visions of the old man included the man appearing as a demonic beast who muttered Latin and threatened to steal his soul. Although the family allegedly heard strange noises coming from the attic, no one but David ever witnessed the old man. After David experienced night terrors, exhibited strange behavior, and obtained unexplained scratches and bruises, the family called upon the services of a Catholic priest, who attempted to bless the house. The terrified family concluded that the house was evil and would no longer continue to rent it.

David's visions worsened, occurring in the daytime as well. Twelve days after the original incident, the family summoned the demonologists Ed and Lorraine Warren to assist. Lorraine witnessed a black mist materialize next to David, an indication of a malevolent presence. Debbie and her mother told the Warrens they had seen David being beaten and choked by invisible hands and that red marks had appeared on his neck afterward. David had started to growl, hiss, speak in otherworldly voices, and recite passages from the Bible or Paradise Lost. The Glatzels recounted how each night a family member would remain awake with David as he suffered through spasms and convulsions. After receiving a prognosis of multiple possessions from the Warrens, David was subjected to three "lesser exorcisms.” Lorraine asserts that David levitated, ceased breathing for a time, and even demonstrated the supernatural ability of precognition, specifically in relation to the manslaughter Johnson would later commit. In October 1980, the Warrens contacted Brookfield police to warn them that the situation was becoming dangerous.

According to eyewitness testimony, Arne Johnson coerced one of the demons, purportedly within David, to possess him while participating in David's exorcisms. It is here that A Haunting veers away from the circumstances of Johnson's possession as described by those involved. According to the show, a few days after Johnson egged the demon on during the exorcism, he was attacked rather viciously by the demon, which allegedly took control of his car and forced it into a tree, but Johnson was unharmed. After this incident, Johnson returned to the rental property to examine an old well that supposedly housed the demon. In both the dramatized version and his personal account, Johnson said that this was his final encounter with the demon while completely lucid. After encountering the demon at the well, and making eye contact with it, he became possessed. The Warrens claim to have warned him not to do this (although their warning was not mentioned in A Haunting). As David's condition worsened further, Debbie and Johnson, who had been living in her mother's home, decided it was time to move. Debbie was hired by Alan Bono, a new resident in Brookfield, as a dog groomer. Debbie and Johnson began renting an apartment close to her place of employment. After moving in, Johnson started to exhibit odd behavior that was strikingly similar to David's, causing Debbie to fear that he had become possessed as well. According to Debbie, Johnson would fall into a trance-like state, wherein he would growl and hallucinate but later have no memory of it.

== The killing ==
On February 16, 1981, Johnson called in sick to his job at Wright Tree Service and joined Debbie at the kennel where she worked, along with his sister Wanda and Debbie's nine-year-old cousin Mary. Bono, the couple's landlord and Debbie's employer at the kennel, bought the group lunch at a local bar and proceeded to drink heavily. After lunch, the group returned to the kennel. Debbie then took the girls to get pizza but insisted they return quickly, anticipating trouble. When they returned, Bono, intoxicated at this point, became agitated. Everyone left the room at Debbie's urging, except Bono, who seized Mary and refused to let go. Johnson headed back to the apartment and ordered Bono to release Mary. Wanda recounted the following events to the police. Mary ran for the car as Debbie attempted to mitigate the situation by standing between the two men. Wanda tried in vain to pull Johnson away. Johnson, growling like an animal, then drew a 5-inch (13 cm) pocket knife and stabbed Bono repeatedly. Bono died several hours later. According to Johnson's lawyer, Bono had suffered "four or five tremendous wounds,” mostly to his chest, and one that stretched from his stomach to the base of his heart. Johnson was discovered 2 miles (3.2 km) from the site of the killing; Sgt. Gordon Fairchild of the Brookfield Police Department, said he helped arrest Johnson on a charge of assault (while Alan Bono was still being treated at the hospital). He said Johnson told him he did not mean to hurt anyone and was unable to remember anything.

While putting him into a police cruiser, Johnson said, “I need help because I’ve got a drinking problem,” Fairchild said. When Johnson was informed at police headquarters that Bono had died, Fairchild said the suspect became incoherent and then fell asleep for 20 to 25 minutes.

When Johnson awoke, Police Detective Sgt. John Lucas advised him of his rights and charged Arne Johnson with first-degree murder; he was held at the Bridgeport Correctional Center on bail of $125,000. This was the first unlawful killing in the history of Brookfield, Connecticut.

== Media reaction and legal proceedings ==
The day after the killing, Lorraine Warren informed the Brookfield Police that Johnson was possessed when the crime was committed. A "media blitz" soon surrounded the story, fueled in part by the Warrens, whose agents promised that lectures, a book, and a movie detailing the gruesome case were in the works. Martin Minnella, Johnson's lawyer, received calls from all over the world about what was being called the "Demon Murder Trial.” Minnella traveled to England to meet with lawyers who had been involved in two similar cases (though neither went to trial). He planned to bring in exorcism specialists from Europe and threatened to subpoena the priests who oversaw David Glatzel's exorcisms if they did not cooperate with the defense.

The trial took place in Connecticut's Superior Court in Danbury, beginning on October 28, 1981. Minnella attempted to submit a plea of not guilty by virtue of possession, but the presiding judge, Robert Callahan, promptly rejected this defense. Callahan argued that no such defense could ever exist in a court of law due to lack of evidence and that it would be "irrelative and unscientific" to allow related testimony. The defense chose to imply that Johnson acted in self-defense. Because of this, the jury was not legally allowed to consider demonic possession as a viable explanation for the killing. The jury deliberated for 15 hours over three days before convicting Johnson on November 24, 1981, of first-degree manslaughter. On December 18, 1981, he was sentenced to 10–20 years behind bars, though he served only five (or approximately one month short of five years).

== Aftermath ==
Lorraine Warren defended her work with the family, claiming that the six priests who were involved in the incident agreed at the time that the boy was possessed and that the supernatural events she described were real. No independent verification of this claim about the priests' alleged views was provided. Glatzel's father, Carl Glatzel Sr., denies telling the author that his son was possessed. Johnson and Debbie (now married) wholeheartedly support the Warrens' account of demonic possession and have stated that the litigants were suing simply for the money.

== Depiction in media ==
=== Book ===
In 1983 Gerald Brittle, with the assistance of Lorraine Warren, published a book about the incident entitled The Devil in Connecticut. Lorraine Warren stated that profits from the book were shared with the family. Sources confirmed that $2,000 was paid to the family by the book publisher.

Upon the book's republication in 2006 by iUniverse, David Glatzel and his brother, Carl Glatzel Jr., sued the authors and book publishers for violating their right to privacy, libel, and "intentional infliction of emotional distress." Carl also claimed that the book alleged he committed criminal and abusive acts against his family and others. He said that the possession story was a hoax concocted by Ed and Lorraine Warren to exploit the family and his brother's mental illness, and that the book presented him as the villain because he did not believe in the supernatural claims. He asserted that the Warrens told him the story would make the family millionaires and would help get Johnson out of jail. Brittle, author of The Devil in Connecticut, says he wrote the book because "the family wanted the story told," that he possesses videos of over 100 hours of his interviews with the family, and that they signed off on the book as accurate before it went to print.

According to Carl Glatzel, the publicity generated by the incident forced him to drop out of school and lose friends and business opportunities. In 2007 he began writing a book, titled Alone Through the Valley, about his version of the events surrounding his brother.

=== Film ===
The event inspired the premise of the 2021 film The Conjuring: The Devil Made Me Do It. An earlier made-for-TV-film based on the case, The Demon Murder Case, was produced in 1983 and starred Kevin Bacon. Netflix produced a documentary in 2023, The Devil On Trial, based on this case. It includes interviews with Carl Glatzel, whose comments suggest a naturalistic alternative to demonic possession: the influence of Sominex.

=== Television ===
The incident led to the creation, in 1983, of a television film titled The Demon Murder Case on NBC, and preparations for a feature film, the production of which was stalled due to internal conflicts.

The Discovery Channel’s paranormal series A Haunting produced the episode Where Demons Dwell based on David’s possession and the Warrens' investigation. The episode omitted the preceding of Arne’s crimes. In 2021, TV series Shock Docs produced an episode titled The Devil Made Me Do It based on this case. Some deemed it more accurate than The Conjuring film, even if the events were depicted too dramatically.

== See also ==
- David Berkowitz
- Michael Taylor (British killer)
- The Devil on Trial (2023 film)
