= Silver Rain (film) =

2015 Nigerian-Ghanaian political drama film

- Directed by: Juliet Asante
- Written by: Juliet Asante
- Produced by: Adizah Yemohley Yemoh
- Release date: 13 March 2015
- Countries: Ghana; Nigeria
- Language: English

Silver Rain is a 2015 Nigerian-Ghanaian political drama film. It was written and directed by Juliet Asante.

== Cast ==
- Belinda Baidoo as Tima
- Michael Bassey as Prince
- Kofi Bucknor as Mr. Timothy
- Joselyn Dumas as Ajoa
- Uru Eke as Loreal
- Offie Kudjo as Mrs. Timothy
- Elikem Kumordzie as Paul
- Annabel Mbaru as Esi
- Enyinna Nwigwe as Bruce
- Chumani Pan as Mark

== Plot ==
The story follows a girl Ajoa who comes from an impoverished family and falls in love with Bruce. Their relationship must thrive amidst social differences.

== Reviews ==
360nobs concluded that "Despite its gaping holes, Silver Rain is entertaining."

Xplorenollywood says it is "a brilliant production with a Pan African cast that did justice to their roles" and rates it 5.5/10.

== Accolades ==
It was nominated on AMVCA 2016 for Best Movie Overall (Africa), Best Movie – West Africa (Drama/Comedy) and Best Costume Designer (Movie/TV Series).
