= Muriel Blanche =

Cameroonian actress, singer and model

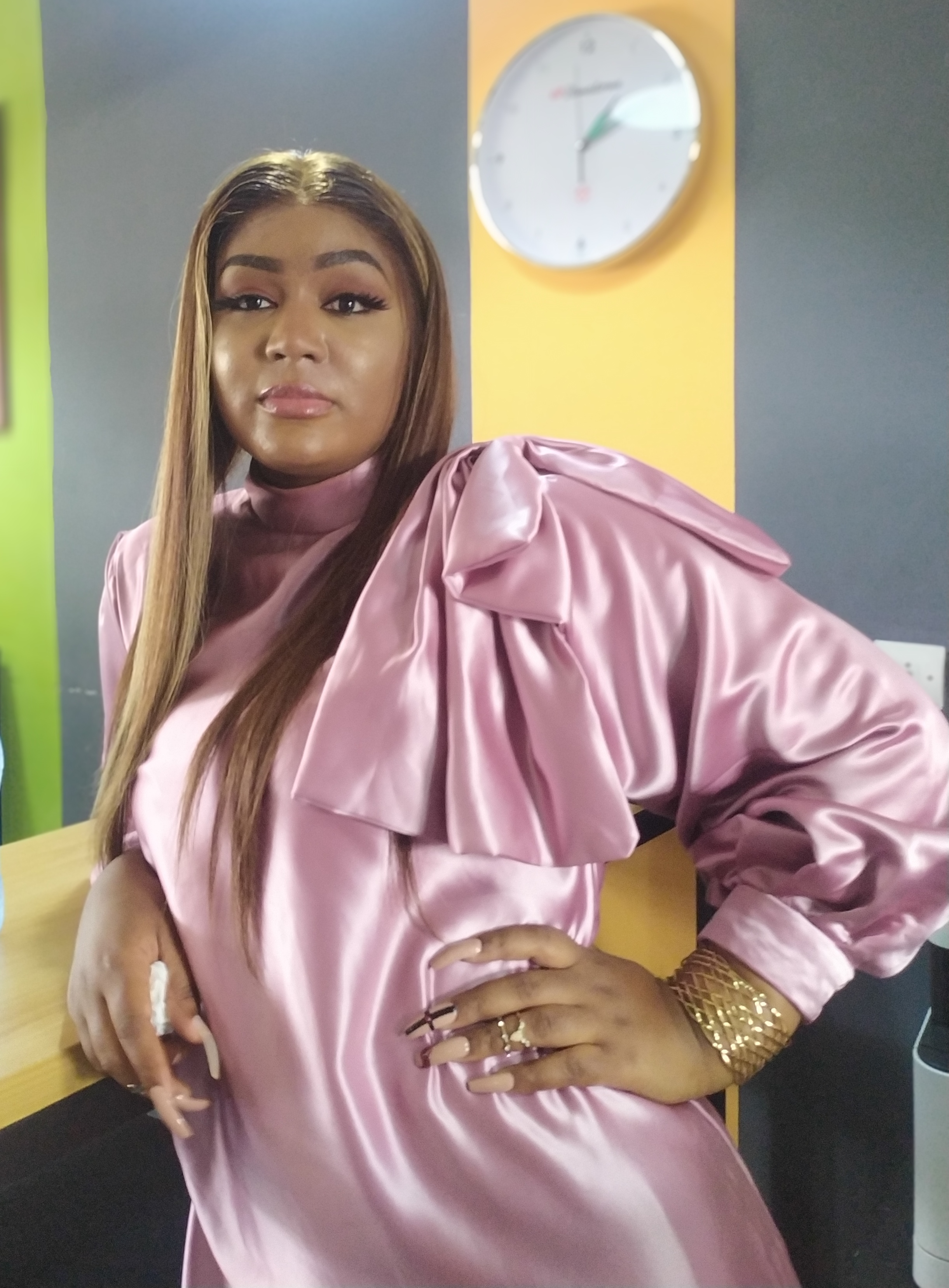
- Muriel Blanche in 2020
- Born: Leumeni Kamcheu Muriel; 25 August 1990 (age 35); Bandja, Cameroon
- Occupations: Actress, model, singer, film director, producer
- Years active: 1976–present

Leumeni Kamcheu Muriel (born 25 August 1990) known professionally as Muriel Blanche is a Cameroonian actor, singer, model, film producer, columnist and businesswoman.

== Biography ==
Leumeni Kamcheu Muriel was born on 25 August 1990 in Bandja, located in the West Region of Cameroon. She is of Bamiléké descent and holds a Brevet de Technicien Supérieur (BTS) in management and international trade.

Her early screen roles included Touni Bush directed by Pascaline Ntema in 2013. That same year she appeared in several Cameroonian film and television productions.

Muriel gained wider recognition in 2017 through the Cameroonian web series Pakgne, in which she starred alongside Marcelle Kuetche. She later featured in productions such as The Tomb of Secrets, Two Beautiful Women Without Mercy, and A Kiss for Two, directed by Dante Fox in 2017.

Her subsequent works include Madame… Monsieur and Habiba (2018), Shenanigans directed by Salem Kedy in 2019, Secret Blood by Maite Bimbia and Aline (2020), as well as Prediction directed by Lucie Memba in 2021. In 2023, she appeared in Nganù, directed by Kang Quintus.

== Filmography ==
=== Web series ===
- Pakgne (2017)

=== Television ===
- The Tomb of Secrets (2017)
- Habiba (2018)
- Madame… Monsieur (2022)

=== Film ===
- Touni Bush (2013)
- A Kiss for Two (2017)
- Two Beautiful Women Without Mercy (2017)
- Shenanigans (2019)
- Secret blood (2020)
- Aline de Salem Kedy (2020)
- Prediction (2021)
- Nganù (2023)

== Discography ==
=== Singles ===
- "Stay there" (2014)
- "Her or me" (2015)
- "Last time" (2017)
- "Love me" (2018)
- "Stuck barred" (2021)

== Songwriting credits ==
- "Help" (songwriter) (2022)

== Awards ==
Year	Event	Category	Result	Ref
2024	Sotigui Awards	Best female performance in a TV series	Won	
2025	Ranks Africa Magazine	Brand Influencer of the Year under	Honoured	
