= A Good Movie to Watch =

Movie recommendation website

- Website type: Film and television recommendation
- Available in: English
- Creator: Bilal Zouheir
- Website: agoodmovietowatch.com
- Commercial: Yes
- Registration: Optional
- Launched: 2013; 13 years ago
- Current status: Active

A Good Movie to Watch (styled agoodmovietowatch) is a film and television recommendation website that curates highly rated but lesser-known titles available on streaming services. Founded in 2013 by Bilal Zouheir, it emphasizes human-curated picks over algorithmic recommendations.

== Concept ==
The site recommends only titles rated at least 7/10 on IMDb and over 70% on Rotten Tomatoes, which human curators use as a starting point for their own picks. Each recommendation carries a short write-up, and titles can be filtered by streaming platform, mood, genre, release year, and country. The highest-rated picks (those with a "Staff Score" of 8.5 or higher) are placed behind a subscription.
