= Kocee =

Cameroonian singer and rapper

- Born: Njang Mengu Collins; Kumba, Cameroon
- Origin: Bafut, Northwest Region, Cameroon
- Genres: Pop rap; Afrobeats; Afro pop music; pop; Amapiano
- Occupations: Rapper; singer; actor; songwriter
- Instruments: singing; rapping
- Years active: 2014–present
- Label: Power House Entertainment

Njang Mengu Collins (born 18 November 1992), known professionally as Kocee, is a Cameroonian rapper, singer, actor and songwriter. He hails from Bafut in the Northwest Region of Cameroon.

== Biography ==
He began his music career by writing songs and sending them to his friends for feedback. He wrote his first song "Town Player" at the age of 20 and began music professionally in the year 2015 when he joined the group of five known as "PIM Boys" (Preach It Movement).

In July 2015, the group of five signed to BTS Empire, a US based music label operated by Valo Valery. In March 2016, the group released its first song "Ici Au Kamer" but parted ways the same year. In November 2016, Ko-c caught the attention of the label Rawget Music and released his first single "Balancé" as a solo artiste.

In 2017, Ko-c signed with Big Dreams Entertainment and rose to prominence the following year after releasing "Balance Remix" featuring Ténor. He spent three successful years with Big Dreams Entertainment and in 2020 decided to go solo again by creating his own, label Power House Entertainment.

== Musical career ==
Njang Mengu Collins (KO-C) now Kocee was born on 18 November 1992 in Kumba, Cameroon. He hails from Santa, in the Northwest region of Cameroon. He attended Victory Nursery and Primary School Mbonge road then Government Bilingual High School Kumba, and later enrolled at CCAST Kumba where he obtained his GCE Advanced Level. In 2014, he gained admission at the Higher Institute of Management Studies (HIMS), Buea where he obtained his Bachelors Degree in Management.

Kocee started off as a rapper, and his unique skills to rap fast on beats earned him the appellation "Cameroon's Fastest Rapper". Kocee began his music career by writing songs and sending them to his friends for review. He wrote his first song "Town Player" at the age of 20. Kocee began doing music professionally in 2015. He was one of the fastest rappers in the group of five. They managed to release a single in the year 2016 but parted ways that same year. In 2017, Kocee caught the attention of the label Rawget Music. The label released his debut single as a solo artiste titled Balancé produced by DeeCy. Things didn't go well with both parties and the rapper went back solo. Kocee recorded a lot of freestyles and shared them on social media. He later caught the attention of Big Dreams Entertainment founder Gervais Ngongang.

In January 2017, Kocee signed a 3-year contract with Big Dreams Entertainment and literally saw his career gaining grounds in the music industry. His first single "I Love You" featuring label mate Locko was the song that marked the beginning of greater things in his career.

He recently put out a new song 'Credit Alert' in which he featured Patoranking

== Acting career ==
KO-C is an actor, starring in movies When the Leeves broke, directed by Musing Derick Tenn and Nganù directed by Kang Quintus where he features as himself(KO-C).

== Discography ==
=== Selected singles ===
- "I Love You" (featuring Locko ) (2017)
- "Laisse Moi Passer" (2017)
- "Bollo C'est Bollo" (2017)
- "Caro" (2018)
- "Balance Remix" (featuring Tenor) (2018)
- "Sango" (featuring Fanicko) (2018)
- "Ça a Cuit" (2019)
- "On S'en Fout" (featuring Ariel Sheney) (2019)
- "Alright" (2020)
- "Mon Pala Pala" (2020)
- "President du Rap-publique" (2020)
- "Ghana Must Go" (featuring Cleo Grae, Banye, Kikoh and Kking Kum) (2020)
- "Caleçon" (featuring Coco Argentee) (2020)
- "Chill" (2021)
- "La Galere" (2021)
- "Deux oeufs spaghetti" (2023)
- "Amen" (2024)
- "Respect" (2024)

=== Albums ===
- "Genesis" (2023)

== Awards and nominations ==
Urban Jamz Awards
Year	Nominee | Work	Award	Result
2018	Himself	Best New Act	Won

Balafon Music Awards
Year	Nominee | Work	Award	Result
2018	Balance Remix featuring Tenor	Best Collaboration Most Downloaded Song	Won Won
2020	Calecon featuring Coco Argentee	Best Music Video	Won

Cameroon Music Evolution Awards
Year	Nominee | Work	Award	Result
2021	Himself	Artiste of the Year	Won

Green Light Awards
Year	Nominee | Work	Award	Result
2019	Himself	Best Male Artiste	Won

Muzikol Music Awards
Year	Nominee | Work	Award	Result
2021	Himself	Best Urban Artiste	Won

Cameroon International Music Festival Awards
Year	Nominee | Work	Award	Result
2021	Himself	Artiste of the Year Best Consistent Artiste	Won

== See also ==
- List of Cameroonian artists
- list of Cameroonian actors
