= Daphne (singer) =

Cameroonian singer (born 1989)

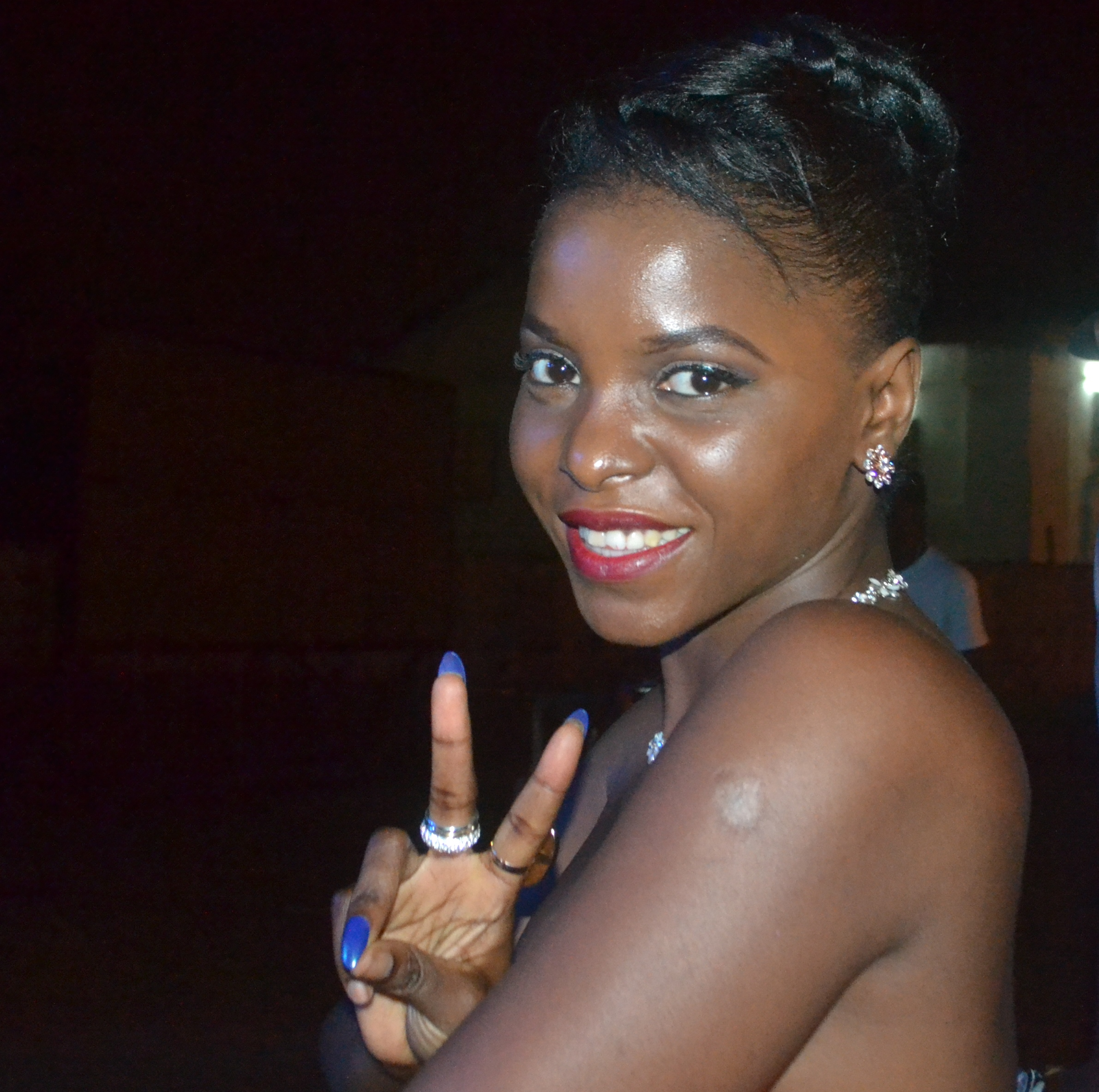
- Daphne in 2017

Background information
- Born: Daphne Njie Efundem; 20 September 1989 (age 37); Buea, Cameroon
- Genres: Afrobeats, RnB, Reggae
- Occupation: Singer
- Instrument: Vocals
- Years active: 2013–present
- Labels: ROCK CD RECORDS, HNM, Kunak Records

Daphne Njie Efundem (born September 20, 1989) known as Daphne, is a Cameroonian singer. She began her career in 2013 and released her first single entitled Rastafari the following year, but gained international recognition in 2017 with her track Calée. She released an album entitled Here to Stay in 2016, and a dozen singles.

== Life and career ==
Daphne was born on September 20, 1989 in Buea. She grew up in Douala. She attended elementary school at Government School Bepanda in Douala, secondary school at Queen of the Rosary College Okoyong in Mamfe and Inter Comprehensive High School in Buea. She also studied law and psychology at the University of Buea.

In 2014, Daphne released her first single Rastafari on the Stevens Music Entertainment label, which helped her gain recognition. The same year, she released Reflection, a 4-track maxi single featuring the songs Ndolo, Broken, Reflection and Rastafari.

In 2016, she invited singer Ben Decca for a cover of the track Ndolo. That same year, she was named Best Female Artist from Central Africa at the African Muzik Magazine Awards (AFRIMMA) in the USA.

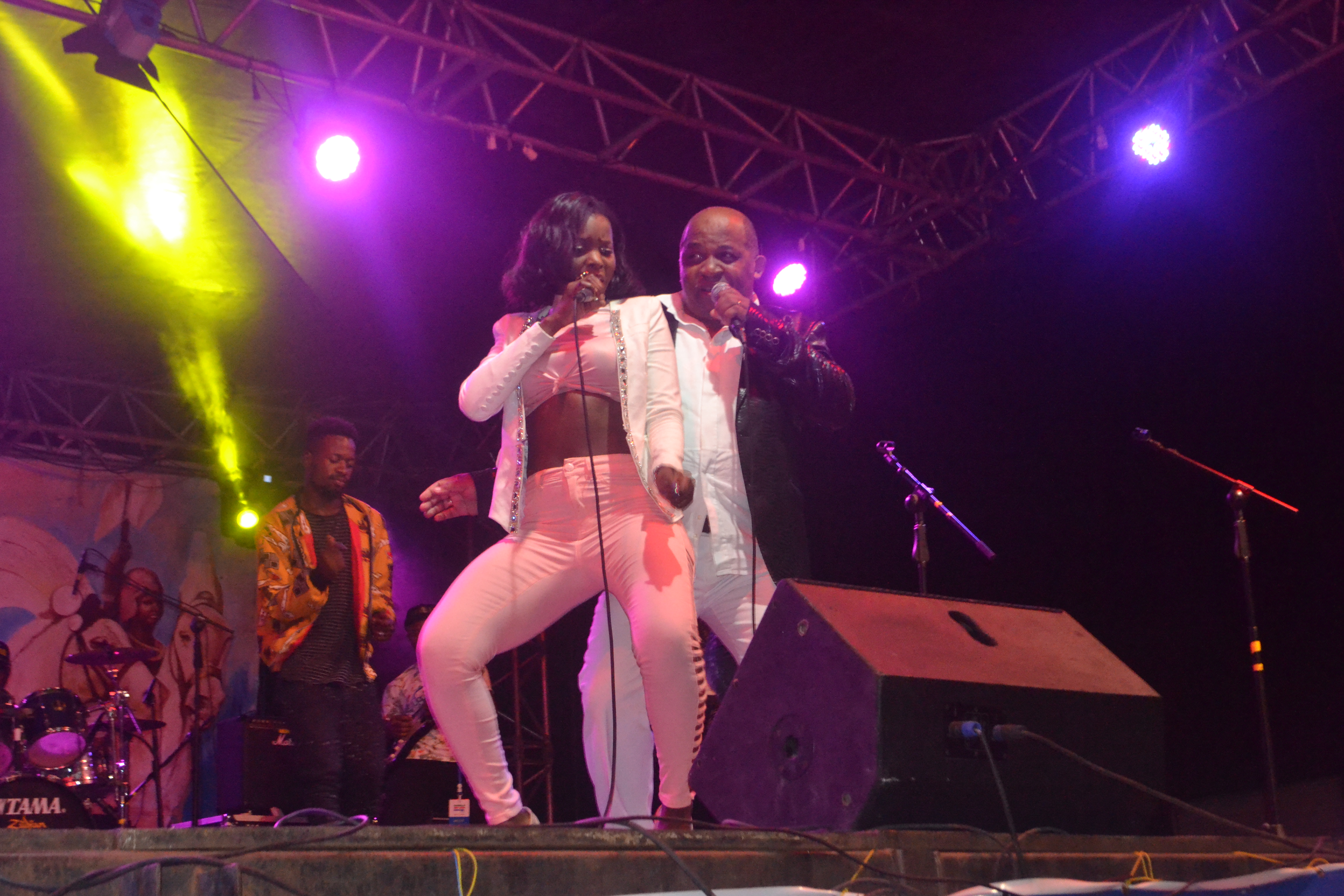
Daphne and singer Ben Decca performing on stage in 2017.

In 2017, she released her hit Calée, which racked up over 10 million views on YouTube in just a few months. She collaborated with singers Mr. Leo and Salatiel on the song. The song's success earned her numerous awards, including Song of the Year and Best Female Vocal at the Balafon Music Awards in 2017. In 2017, she embarked on her first African tour, with concerts in Côte d'Ivoire, Benin, Gabon, Togo and Equatorial Guinea.

In 2018, she sang in Andoany on the island of Nosy Be in Madagascar at the fifth edition of the Sômarôho Festival organized each year by singer Wawa. In 2019, Daphne was crowned queen of the Canal 2'Or edition, winning four awards on her own in the categories Female Artist of the Year, Female Urban Music Artist or Group, Best Digital Performance and Popular Song. She is the first artist in Canal 2'Or history to win so many awards in a single edition. The same year, she was also crowned Best Female Artist at the Balafon Music Awards and winner of the Talk Fashion and Art de la Diaspora Rise Up Gala held in Paris in January 2020.

In October 2021, she was elected member of the jury for the first season of The Voice Kids Afrique Francophone.

In 2020, she featured in Fisherman's Diary where she portrayed the role of Mrs. Anang Joe. In 2021, she performed at the Anoumabo Urban Music Festival in Ivory Coast.

== Personal life ==
On July 26, 2023, Daphne gave birth to her daughter, named Afanwi, in the United States.

== Discography ==
=== Singles ===
- Ndolo (feat. Ben Decca) (2016)
- Calée (2017)
- Promets-moi (2017)
- Jusqu'à la Gare (2017)
- My Lover (2018)
- Ne Lâches Pas (2018)
- Doucement (2019)
- Là-bas (2021)

=== Collaboration ===
- Numerica feat. Daphne - No Way (2016)
- Salatiel feat. Daphne - Comme ça (À nous deux) (2018)
- Hiro feat. Daphne - Number One (2018)
- Fanicko feat. Daphne - Avec Toi (2019)
- Stanley Enow feat. Daphne - Forever (2019)
- Abz feat. Daphne - Ololiyo (2020)
- Boy Tag feat. Daphne - Far Away (2020)
- Ful feat. Daphne - Reviens Moi (2020)
- Koffi Olomide feat. Daphne - You Got It (2020)

=== Album ===
- Here to Stay (2016)

=== EP ===
- Reflection (2014)

== Filmography ==
(2020) Fisherman's Diary

=== Balafon Music Awards ===
- Winner Song of the Year (2017)
- Best Female Voice (2017)
- Female Artist of the Year (2019)

=== AFRIMMA ===
- Best female artist in Central Africa (2016)

=== Canal 2'Or ===
- Female artist of the year (2019)
- Female urban music artist or group (2019)
- Best digital performance (2019)
- Laureate Popular song (2019)
