= Salatiel =

Cameroon music artist and producer (b. 1987)

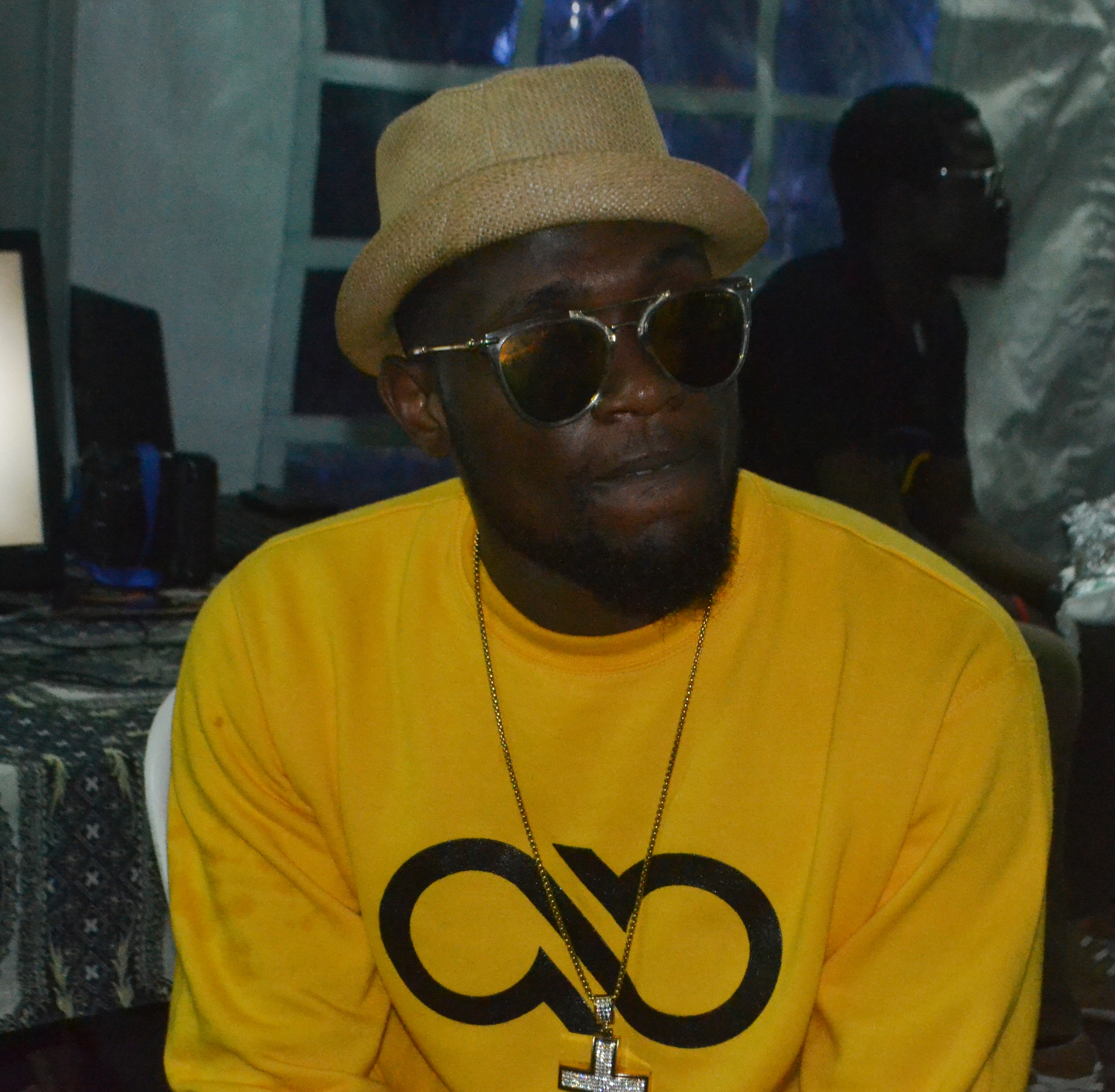

Background information
- Also known as: Highman general
- Born: Salatiel Livenja Bessong; December 26, 1987 (age 38); Tiko, Cameroon
- Origin: Tiko , Cameroon
- Genres: Afro-Pop, Afrobeats, hip hop
- Occupations: Singer, songwriter, record producer
- Instruments: Vocals, guitar, piano
- Years active: 2008–present
- Label: Alpha Better Record

Salatiel Livenja Bessong (born December 26, 1987), better known as Salatiel or "High man general", is a Cameroonian Music executive, and the CEO of Alpha Better Records located in Buea, Cameroon. In 2019, he featured on Beyoncé’s The Lion King: The Gift Album on the track "Water".

== Career ==
His career started in 2014, the year Alpha Better Records was founded; producing about 60 percent of Cameroon Hit songs between 2014 and the present with hit songs from artists like Mr. Leo, Daphne, Askia, and Blaise B. He emerged the best producer of the Urban Jamz Awards 2018 edition, and had six nominations for Best Music Video Performance, Best Music Producer, Best Afrobeat/Pop Song, Best Collabo, Best Male Artist and Artist of The Year Urban Jamz Awards 2019 edition. His single "Fab Kolo" won the MTN Cameroon Make the Contest competition. In July 2019, he announced the release of his first international album titled Africa Represented will be launched on most streaming platforms, he has been nominated at the AFRIMMA Awards 2019.

== Awards and nominations ==
- Won "Best Male Artist of the Year" on Urban Jamz Awards. (AFRIMA 2018)
- Won "the MTN Cameroon Make the contest competition.
- Nominated for "Best Music video performance, Best music producer, Best Afrobeat/pop song, Best Collabo, Best Male Artist and Artist of The Year" for Cameroon 2019.

== Discography ==
=== Albums ===
- 2021: Africa represented

=== Singles ===
- 2014: Fap Kolo
- 2016: Ça Se Passe Ici
- 2016: One Day Na One Day
- 2016: Bougez La Bas! ft Maahlox Le Vibeur & Myra
- 2016: We Are Champions ft Mr Leo ft Mink's, Daphne, Valdez et Mary A
- 2017: Toi et Moi
- 2017: La Femme De Ma Galère
- 2018: Comme Ça ft. Daphne
- 2018: Weekend
- 2018 : Sans Complexe feat Magasco
- 2019: Anita
- 2020: Ayagayo (Good Times)
- 2022: Pelé feat Petit Pays
- 2024: Closer
- 2024: Family Man
- 2024: Feelings
- 2024: Touché
- 2024: First Lady
- 2024: Çava aller
- 2024: Sucré Nouveau
- 2024: Est Ce Que C'est Ça L'amour
- 2024: Quand Tu Es Jeune

=== Collaborations ===
- 2016: Clando by Blaise B
- 2016: Sponsor by Mink's
- 2017: Higher Higher by Mr. Leo avec Askia et Blaise B
- 2017: Qu'Est Ce Qui N'a Pas Marché? feat Mr. Leo, Askia et Blaise B
- 2018: Rembourser by Meshi
- 2018: C'est la vie by Mr Leo
- 2019: Seul Au Monde Remix de byGérard Ben
- 2019: Che Woue by Stephane Akam
- 2019: Water feat Beyonce & Pharrell Williams
- 2020: Sans toi bySandy
- 2021: Iyori by Rinyu
- 2022: Junglage by Dinga
