= Magasco =

- Magasco in concert in LBV Gabon

Background information
- Also known as: Magasco Efsi, Bamenda Boy
- Born: Tohnain Anthony Nguo; September 22, 1986 (age 39); Bamenda, Cameroon
- Origin: Kom people (Cameroon)
- Genres: Afro-Pop, Afrobeats, Dancehall, hip hop
- Occupations: Singer, songwriter
- Instrument: Vocals
- Years active: 2006–present
- Labels: Mumak Records, BBoy Record(Record Label), Bboy Records

Tohnain Anthony Nguo (born September 22, 1986) better known as Magasco aka "Bamenda Boy" is a Cameroonian Afro-pop/afrobeats and Dancehall artist from Northwest Region (Cameroon).

== Biography ==
=== Early life ===
Magasco was born in Bamenda in 1988 and is from the Kom tribe in North West Region of Cameroon.

=== Career ===
Magasco's first public appearance was at a talent show called Positive Vibrations back in 1999. He formed a group of rappers in 2000 called "T-Drops" with longtime besties DaBlu and Klone. In 2009, the group separated because DaBlu left for the U.S. where he is currently doing music. After getting his A-level, he was then selected to be among the candidates for the NW region at the Nescafé singing competition along with Joys and Nasty.

At the beginning of his career Magasco worked with label (Mumak) Where after releasing his debut single Line loba (land rover), same exposure let him to be signed under a biggest Cameroonian urban label Empire Company of Pit Baccardi.

In 2013, Magasco was nominated for "Best Urban Artist" for Cameroon, which did not win but he keeps his head high for better achievements. Magasco now under Empire, has released two singles so far (Fine BOY) and (Marry Me) which are currently hitting the world under the influence of National and international media. The remix of his song "Fine Boy " with DUC Z was included in the Mboa Tape Vol2 Magasco is currently making several appearances in Cameroon starting in his hometown Bamenda where he will be performing at the (In the Moov) concert. Magasco is currently working on his first album which was announced for early 2015. He has been Nominated in other awards shows like Afrimma Awards.

On December 25, 2015, he released his first EP titled Raw Gold. His first album titled Golden Boy is due to be released on December 29, 2017.

=== Awards and nominations ===
- Won "Best Northwest Urban Artist" on the Red Feather Awards.
- Won "Bafani Awards" in the category of Revolutionary Artist in Bamenda.
- Nominated for "Best Urban Artist" for Cameroon.
- Nominated for "Best Male Artist in Central Africa" at All African Music Awards (AFRIMA 2018).

== Discography ==
=== Albums ===
- 2010: Bamenda Boy 1
- 2017: Golden Boy
- 2019: Heart
- 2022: Affection
- 2023: Kings
- 2023: Infinity
- 2024: Vida
- 2025: Red Carpet

=== Singles ===
- 2012: Line Loba
- 2013: Kumba Market
- 2014: Fine Boy
- 2014: Fine Boy Remix (featuring Duc Z)
- 2014: Marry Me
- 2014: Wule Bang Bang
- 2015: No Man no Wowo
- 2015: Belinda
- 2016: All VIP
- 2017: Zamba
- 2017: Bella
- 2017: Sokoto
- 2017: Power
- 2017: Love It (featuring Shan'L)
- 2018: Validation
- 2019: Kongossa
- 2019: Killer With
- 2018: Under My Bed
- 2018: Donner Donner
- 2019: Crème De La Crème
- 2019: Cami Toyottta
- 2020: ATM
- 2020: Sans Couteau
- 2020: Calypso (featuring Mihney)
- 2020: Monica
- 2020: Nyang Nyang (featuring Lady Ponce)
- 2021: Gift
- 2021: Better For Me (Stanley Enow)
- 2021: Gift (Remix)
- 2021: African Woman
- 2022: Today Na Today (featuring K-Tino)
- 2022: Future
- 2022: Yes I Do
- 2023: Turn by Turn
- 2023: Regret (Remix)
- 2023: Merry Christmas
- 2024: Continent (featuring OG Skott)
- 2024: Folo Folo Remix (featuring Ange Ebogo)
- 2024: Friday (featuring Kameni)
- 2024: Night and Day
- 2025: Evil Things
- 2025: Dirty Wine (featuring Mimie)
- 2025: Crème De La Crème II
- 2025: I Want 4

=== EPs ===
- 2015: Raw Gold
- 2020: Magasco Live Acoustics Vol.1
- 2020: Underrated
- 2022: Love in Transition
- 2023: Christmas
- 2025: The Cold Rainy Days

=== Collaborations ===
- 2015: Oublier (featuring Dosseh)
- 2015: It's Ova feat Vicky
- 2015: Faya Di Burn feat Gasha
- 2016: One By One feat Pit Baccardi
- 2016: Arrêtez (featuring Pit Baccardi)
- 2017: Love it feat Shan'L
- 2018: Bafut Remix (featuring Amber)
- 2019: Trompé (featuring Pit Baccardi)
- 2020: Be Proud (featuring Wity Minstrel)
- 2024: Vivian
- 2024: Toxic (featuring Cleo Gray)
- 2025: Lumière Remix (featuring Kotto Boy)
