= Albert Mukong =

Cameroonian writer (1933–2004)

- Born: 23 October 1933; Cameroon
- Died: 17 July 2004 (aged 70); Bamenda, Cameroon
- Education: St Joseph College SASSE
- Occupation: Politician
- Title: Writer

Albert Mukong (23 October 1933 – 17 July 2004) was a Cameroonian writer who was born in Babanki Turgo, in the Northwest Region of Cameroon.

== Early life and career ==
Born on 23 October 1933, in Cameroon, Mukong received his primary education from St Anthony primary school in Njinikom. and attended St. Joseph's college Sasse, Buea. He later moved to Nigeria to study Physics.

Apart from being a direct election opponent in the 1950s and 1960s of the late John Ngu Foncha; former prime minister and vice president of Cameroon, Mukong participated in talks leading to Cameroon's independence at the United Nations in New York. Albert Mukong was a journalist and an outspoken long time opponent of the one party system in Cameroon. He was the secretary of the One Party Kamerun Political party led by NDEH Tumazah. In 1988, he was arrested after giving a BBC interview in which he criticised Cameroon's government and President. He has successive sets of arrests and releases in 1978, 1988, 1990 and 2002 due to his various political affiliations and activities.

Albert Mukong left Cameroon on self exile in 1990, immediately following the Yondo Black trial and only returned in 1992. In August 1994, the United Nations Human Rights Committee recognized the Cameroonian State guilty of having violated the rights of Albert Mukong during his imprisonment and recommended the payment of compensation. This decision led Albert Mukong to create an NGO in 1995, the Human Rights Defence Group.

== Publications ==
Albert Mukong’s most popular book is Prisoner without a Crime, My Stewardship in Cameroon's Struggle, and the problems of New Deal.

== Death ==
He was rearrested and then released in October 2002. He died on 17 July 2004, aged 70, in Bamenda.
