= Lysoka Moliwe =

Village in Cameroon

Coordinates: 04°13′07″N 09°18′22″E

Lysoka Moliwe is a village in the Buea Subdivision of the Fako Division of the South West Region of Cameroon.

== Overview ==
Lysoka Moliwe is a third class chiefdom in the Buea Council Area.

There is a Presbyterian Church and the Government Technical College Lysoka, which was opened in about 2006.
