= NGU (disambiguation) =

NGU may refer to:

- Non-gonococcal urethritis
- Nitroguanidine: a low explosive chemical
- ngu: ISO code of the Guerrero Nahuatl language

== Persons ==
- ʻUelingatoni Ngū: a 19th-century Tongan Crown Prince
- Victor Anomah Ngu: a Cameroonian professor

== Science ==
- Geological Survey of Norway (Norges geologiske undersøkelse in Norwegian)

== Universities ==
- North Greenville University: a university in South Carolina, USA
- Nagoya Gakuin University: a private university located in Nagoya, Japan
- Newgiza University: a private university in Giza, Egypt

== Other ==
- National Guard of Ukraine
