= CPPA =

CPPA is an acronym that may refer to:

- Constant purchasing power accounting
- Child Pornography Prevention Act of 1996
- Cameroon Press Photo Archive
- California Privacy Protection Agency
- Conference for Progressive Political Action
