= Liongo, Fako =

Coordinates: 4°10′43″N 9°18′31″E

Liongo is a village in the Buea Subdivision in the Fako Division of the South West Region of Cameroon.

== Overview ==
Liongo is third class chiefdom in the Buea Council Area. It is home to Cameroonians mostly of the Bakweri origin

== Notable Institution ==
G.S.S Liongo
