= Bonduma =

Bonduma Wonduma
- Location in Cameroon
- Country: Cameroon
- Province: Southwest Region
- Division: Fako

Population (2013)
  - Total: 6,000
  - Ethnicities: Bakweri

Bonduma, also known as Wonduma by the indigenous Bakweri people, is one of the quarters of Buea, the capital of the Southwest Region of Cameroon. Although there is no clear distinction between the regions, over the years Bonduma has evolved into two sections: Upper Bonduma and Lower Bonduma. Upper Bonduma, known in local parlance as agong, is considered a fast growing locality in the Buea Municipality.

== History ==
Although a vast majority of the Buea Municipality was originally occupied by the indigenous Bakweri tribe, the area of Upper Bonduma was originally inhabited by a number of people from the other ethnic groups of Cameroon. Most of these people hailed from the Lebialem Division of the Southwest Region of Cameroon. Accustomed to subsistence farming, the original settlers of the locality practiced agriculture as their primary activity. These settlers were drawn to the rich volcanic soils of what is now the Buea Municipality and its beneficial location at the foot of Mount Cameroon.

== Geography ==
=== Population ===
In 2013, Bonduma had an estimated population of about 6,000 people. The Cameroonian Civil War, beginning in 2017, and its associated socio-political crises and The socio-political crisis and population displacement caused by the Anglophone Crisis, which began in 2017 and continues into the present, has led to an influx of people from other crisis-stricken regions of Cameroon into Bonduma.

=== Climate ===
Buea has a subtropical highland climate, with high humidity because of its location at the foot of Mount Cameroon. Neighborhoods at higher elevations enjoy cooler temperatures, while neighborhoods at lower elevations experience hotter temperatures. Bonduma has a more moderate elevation, generating average temperatures between these two extremes. Extended periods of rainfall, characterized by incessant drizzle, are common during the rainy season and can last for several weeks. During the dry season, Bonduma can suffer from intense water shortages. The latter is becoming increasingly common because of dry conditions in Buea recently.

== Culture ==
=== Languages ===
The local language in Bonduma is Mòkpè (also Mokpwe), the language of the majority Bakweri population in Buea. French and English are official languages in Buea, but the town is primarily anglophone. Many of the inhabitants of Buea use Cameroonian Pidgin English.

== Location ==
The main street of Bonduma is Dr. Biaka Street, named after the late Dr. Lawrence Francis Tonye Biaka, whose residence is near Buea's primary road. Biaka founded the Biaka University Institute of Buea in 1998, then known as the St. Francis School of Nursery and Midwifery.

== Education ==
- City of God Bilingual Nursery and Primary School
- Community Education Centre
- Government Primary School
- Nabesk Comprehensive College
