= Hyperolius bolifambae =

Conservation status
- Least Concern (IUCN 3.1)

Scientific classification
- Kingdom: Animalia
- Phylum: Chordata
- Class: Amphibia
- Order: Anura
- Family: Hyperoliidae
- Genus: Hyperolius
- Species: H. bolifambae

Binomial name
- Hyperolius bolifambae Mertens, 1938

Synonyms
- Hyperolius erythropus Laurent, 1943

Species of amphibian

Hyperolius bolifambae (also known as Bolifamba reed frog or Medje reed frog) is a species of frog in the family Hyperoliidae. It is known from southeastern Nigeria, southern Cameroon, and southwestern Central African Republic, with an isolated record in northeastern Democratic Republic of the Congo (type locality of Hyperolius erythropus, now in synonymy); the latter record may be considered doubtful. It likely has a broader range towards south and east than currently documented, and the AmphibiaWeb includes Gabon and the Republic of the Congo in the distribution.

== Etymology ==
The specific name bolifambae refers to its type locality, "Bolifamba", near Mount Cameroon.

== Description ==
Adult males measure 21–26 mm (0.83–1.02 in) and adult females 30–33 mm (1.2–1.3 in) in snout–vent length. There are two distinct colour phases, "J" and "F". Juveniles and many mature males show phase J whereas mature females and some mature males show phase F. Phase J is characterized by yellow ventrum, whereas in phase F the ventrum is black with large white spots. In both cases, the dorsum is uniform yellow to brown. The flanks are darker chocolate-brown and clearly distinct from the dorsal colour. Sometimes there are chocolate-brown spots on the dorsum. Distinctive to this species, the dorsal surface of tibia is always bi-coloured: the front part is brown, and the hind part is yellow.

The male advertisement call is a high-pitched buzzing.

== Habitat and conservation ==
Hyperolius bolifambae is a bush land species that occurs at elevations below 600 m (2,000 ft) asl. It presumably also lives in secondary vegetation in the tropical forest belt. Breeding takes place in small ponds. It is locally common or abundant, and there are no known major threats to this adaptable species. It occurs in some protected areas, including the Korup National Park (Cameroon) and Dzanga-Ndoki National Park (Central African Republic).
