= St. Joseph's College, Sasse =

Secondary school in Cameroon

Information
- Motto: Fides Quarens Intellectum (Faith seeking Understanding)
- Religious affiliation: Catholicism
- Established: 1939; 87 years ago
- Gender: Boys

St. Joseph's College, Sasse (Sasse College or Republic of Sasse) is the first secondary school in the Cameroons. It is secondary school in the Southwest Region of Cameroon, with its campus located in Sasse, Buea. It was created in 1939 by the Mill Hill Missionaries.

Affiliated with the Catholic faith as an all-male institution, it provides education at the first cycle and high school levels, offering programs in science and arts. In 2012, Sasse college was awarded the prize of the best school in West Africa.

In 2013, Sasse College was awarded the pioneer prize of "Best School in Cameroon" by Fondation Terre d'accueil.

The motto of the school is Fides Quarens Intellectum meaning 'Faith seeking Understanding'. a reference to the philosophy of St. Augustine (354–430) and St. Anselm (c. 1033 – 1109) starting the life of a scholar is incomplete without first proceeding from a position of faith.

St Joseph's College started small in Bonjongo, Buea, in 1937. The Mill Hill Missionaries later moved it to Sasse in 1939 as a Minor Seminary, where most of the students graduated and moved to the Major Seminary in Owerri, Nigeria. Initially inaugurated with two dormitories only, a kitchen, a science laboratory and a handful of students, Sasse has grown in leaps and bounds. It has produced several priests, bishops and several other notable people, including former Prime Minister Peter Mafany Musonge, Prof. Victor Anomah Ngu, and Prof. Ephraim Ngwafor. Though now a single-sex institution, some ten women also passed through Sasse; Emerensia Besumbu Njume, now based in the US, attended Sasse in 1966. At the time, there was an attempt to transform the college into a co-educational institution. The attempt, however, failed, and the girls were transferred to Our Lady of Lourdes College, Bamenda and Queen of the Rosary College, Okoyong, Mamfe.

== Houses ==
The college has nine houses, all named after saints of the Catholic Church, which are;

- Saint Kizito
- Saint Aquinas
- Saint Paul
- Saint James
- Saint George
- Saint Peter
- Saint Augustine
- Saint Marinus
- Saint Martins

== Principals and heads ==
Sasse College has had 21 Principals, the first being Rev. Fr. Aloys Schgor. After the white Rev. Fathers sowed the seeds of the College, the black Rev. Fathers continued the forts. The first black Principal was Rev. Fr. Lucas Atang who later on became Monsignor Atang. He took over from Rev. Father L. Flinn, in 1970. All the Principals have been Rev. Fathers except Mr. Ferdinand E. Ngando, who was Principal in 1977 to 1992. He handed over to Monsignor James Toba.

== Sasse School Anthem ==
"Near the Buea Mountain

High above the sea,

Stands St. Joseph’s College

A place for you and me,

Tis here that we learn Biology

And Geometry and Chemistry.

O Sasse by the Mountain!

O Sasse by the Sea!

Time will come for the roll call,

Time for us to start!

Early in the morning

With strong and happy hearts.

I still feel the fragrance of the air,

The gardens fair and evening prayers!

O Sasse by the Mountain!

O Sasse by the Sea!

Marching in the study,

Going down to dine;

Resting in our billets

When bugle’s gone at nine.

We always remember Saturday nights,

The Sunday whites and Monday

bright! O Sasse by the Mountain!"

== Sasse Old Boys ==
Former students of St. Joseph's College, Sasse are known as Sobans. The Sasse College Alumni association is known as Sasse Old Boys Association(SOBA). There are notable members of Cameroonian society that adhere to the Sasserian values and are extended an invitation to become members of Sasse Old Boys club. They generally known as Honorary Sobans.

== See also ==
- Education in Cameroon
