= Marie Etengeneng Kwamu-Nana Abunaw =

Cameroonian lawyer and prison administrator

- Born: 8 March 2024
- Died: 29 May 1953
- Education: University of Benin (Nigeria)
- Occupation: Lawyer

Marie Etengeneng Kwamu-Nana Abunaw (29 May 1953 – 8 March 2024) was a Cameroonian lawyer and prison administrator. She was the first woman to serve as the General Administrator of Prisons in Cameroon.

== Early life and education ==
Marie Etengeneng Kwamu-Nana Abunaw was born on 29 May 1953 in Besongabang, Manyu Division, Cameroon. She pursued higher education at the University of Benin (Nigeria), where she obtained a bachelor's degree in Public Administration in 1980. She later attended the National School of Penitentiary Administration (ENAP) in Buea and the National School of Administration and Judiciary (ENAM) in Yaoundé, where she earned a postgraduate diploma in Penitentiary Administration in 1993.

== Career ==
In 1997, Kwamu-Nana was appointed the first female Director of the National School of Penitentiary Administration (ENAP) in Buea, a role she held until 2004 when she was succeeded by Fonkem Immaculate. From August 2004 to January 2007, she served as the Inspector General at the Ministry of Justice, overseeing Penitentiary Administration and implementing key reforms to improve prison conditions in Cameroon.

On 6 September 2006, she was appointed a member of the National Commission on Human Rights and Freedoms by presidential decree. She served in this capacity from February 2007 until her retirement in May 2015.

After her retirement in 2015, Kwamu-Nana continued her humanitarian work, dedicating herself to prison reform and community support programs. She founded the non-profit organization Justice Equity Prison Fellowship Cameroon (JE-PFC), based in Buea, which provided support, vocational training, and material assistance to prisoners. In addition to supporting prisoners, JE-PFC also provided social support to children of incarcerated parents. In 2022, the organization assisted 103 children by offering school supplies and other essential items to improve their educational opportunities. On 1 January 2023, under her leadership, JE-PFC paid fines for 15 inmates who had completed their jail terms but were unable to pay their court fines, amounting to FCFA 1.5 million.

== Personal life ==
Marie Etengeneng Kwamu-Nana Abunaw was married to Justice Nana Kwamu and had seven children.

== Death ==
Kwamu-Nana died on 8 March 2024 at the Regional Hospital of Buea after a brief illness.

== See also ==
- Human rights in Cameroon
- Notable people from Buea
