= Etso Ugbodaga-Ngu =

Nigerian artist (1921–1996)

- Born: Etso Clara Ugbodaga-Ngu; 1921; Kano, Nigeria
- Died: 1996 (aged 74–75); Cameroon
- Citizenship: Nigeria
- Education: Art teacher's diploma, National Diploma in Design
- Alma mater: University of London; Chelsea School of Art
- Occupation: Artist
- Known for: First Nigerian and first woman professor at Nigerian College of Arts, Science and Technology; first female Nigerian artist to have a solo exhibition in London, England
- Spouse: Victor Anomah Ngu (m. 1960)
- Children: 4

Beggars (1963)

Etso Clara Ugbodaga-Ngu, known as Ugbodaga-Ngu (1921–1996), was a Nigerian artist and teacher. Her art featured vibrant colours and portrayed strength and purpose. Her geometric style evolved from earlier works such as "Market Women" (1961) and left a lasting mark on Nigerian culture and politics. She was the first Nigerian and the first woman to become a professor at the Nigerian College of Arts, Science and Technology (later Ahmadu Bello University) and the first female Nigerian artist to have a solo exhibition in London, England.

== Early life and education ==
Etso Clara Ugbodaga was born in 1921 in Kano, Kano State, Nigeria, to parents from Edo. She was educated at missionary schools in Kano and Zaria, and later taught in those same schools from 1945 to 1950. During this time, she taught children from eight different tribes who had no common language, so she developed the use of art as a teaching and communication method. She was awarded a scholarship by the colonial administration in Nigeria in 1950, which gave her the opportunity to study at the Chelsea School of Art in London, England. She graduated with a diploma in design and painting in 1954. In 1955, she earned a teaching diploma from the University of London.

== Career ==
Ugbodaga-Ngu returned to Nigeria after qualifying in London. She became the first Nigerian and the first woman to become a professor at the Nigerian College of Arts, Science and Technology (later Ahmadu Bello University) in Zaria. She was member of the faculty between 1955 and 1964, but met opposition from colonial white British colleagues there.

Ugbodaga-Ngu held various roles, from teaching to lecturing at universities and operating her studio. Her students included Solomon Wangboje, Uche Okeke, Simon Okeke, and Bruce Onobrakpeya. She taught the students who formed the Zaria Art Society, "most of the leading Nigerian contemporary artists". She later commented that the "majority of the young men who were my students are Nigeria's main source of manpower in institutions of higher learning, museums, industries and [the] private sector."

Ugbodaga-Ngu also served as a state adviser during FESTAC in 1975 and later became a lecturer at the University of Benin.

== Exhibitions ==
=== Solo exhibitions ===
- Commonwealth Institute Art Gallery, London, 1958 making her first female Nigerian artist to have a solo exhibition in London.
- Radcliffe Graduate Center, Boston, Massachusetts, US, May 1963.

=== Group exhibitions ===
- Independence Exhibition, British Council, Lagos, 1960.
- Contemporary Nigerian Art, Commonwealth Institute Art Gallery, London, 1968.
- FESTAC '77, Lagos, 1977, where only seven artists out of sixty-three were women.
- National Art Exhibition, National Theatre, Lagos, 1980.
- Exhibition of Nigerian Contemporary Art, Dakar, Senegal, 1980.

== Collections ==
Her painting "Dancers" was acquired by Elbert G. Mathews, the U.S. Ambassador to Nigeria in the 1960s, recognising its cultural significance. It was sold by Bonhams in 2022 for £47,750 and was the first time her work was offered at auction.

The labourer's song (1963) which had previously been sold through Galerie Leandro, Geneva and owned by Solomon G. Odia, was offered for sale on 8 October 2025 by Bonhams.

The University of Birmingham holds Abstract (c.1960) as part of the Danford Collection of West African Art and Artefacts.

“Elemu” Yoruba Palm Wine Seller, ca.1963, is held in Hampton University Museum, in Virginia, United States.

Her work has been featured in two recent exhibitions: African Modernism in America,1947–67 (2024), and Nigeria Modernism at Tate Modern (October 2025 – May 2026).

== Personal life ==
Ugbodaga met Victor Anomah Ngu, a Cameroonian surgeon, during her time studying in London and married him in 1960, adding Ngu to her surname. The couple had four children. In September 1962, they moved to Boston, Massachusetts, for a year when Victor was awarded a Rockefeller fellowship.

Ugbodaga-Ngu died in Cameroon in 1996.
