= Naigahelp =

Humanitarian aid organisation

- Founded: May 2011
- Type: medical charity organisation
- Purpose: Medical equipment donations, Educational campaigns, Medical assistance
- Location: Freiburg im Breisgau, Germany
- Region served: West Africa, mainly Nigeria and Cameroon
- Key people: Tonio Schaffert, Konstantin Wagner
- Website: naigahelp.org

Naigahelp (German: "Naigahelp - Organisation für Afrikahilfe", meaning Naigahelp organisation for aid in Africa) is a humanitarian aid organisation which provides medical assistance for health centres in West Africa.

== Creation ==
Naigahelp emerged from an informal organized clique of German students, who tried to work against the grievances in low income countries by means of supporting other charity organizations, e.g. for the treatment of noma.

While working in Cameroon as medical attendants, the two Naigahelp raisers experienced the particular incident which led them to the idea of founding their own organization.

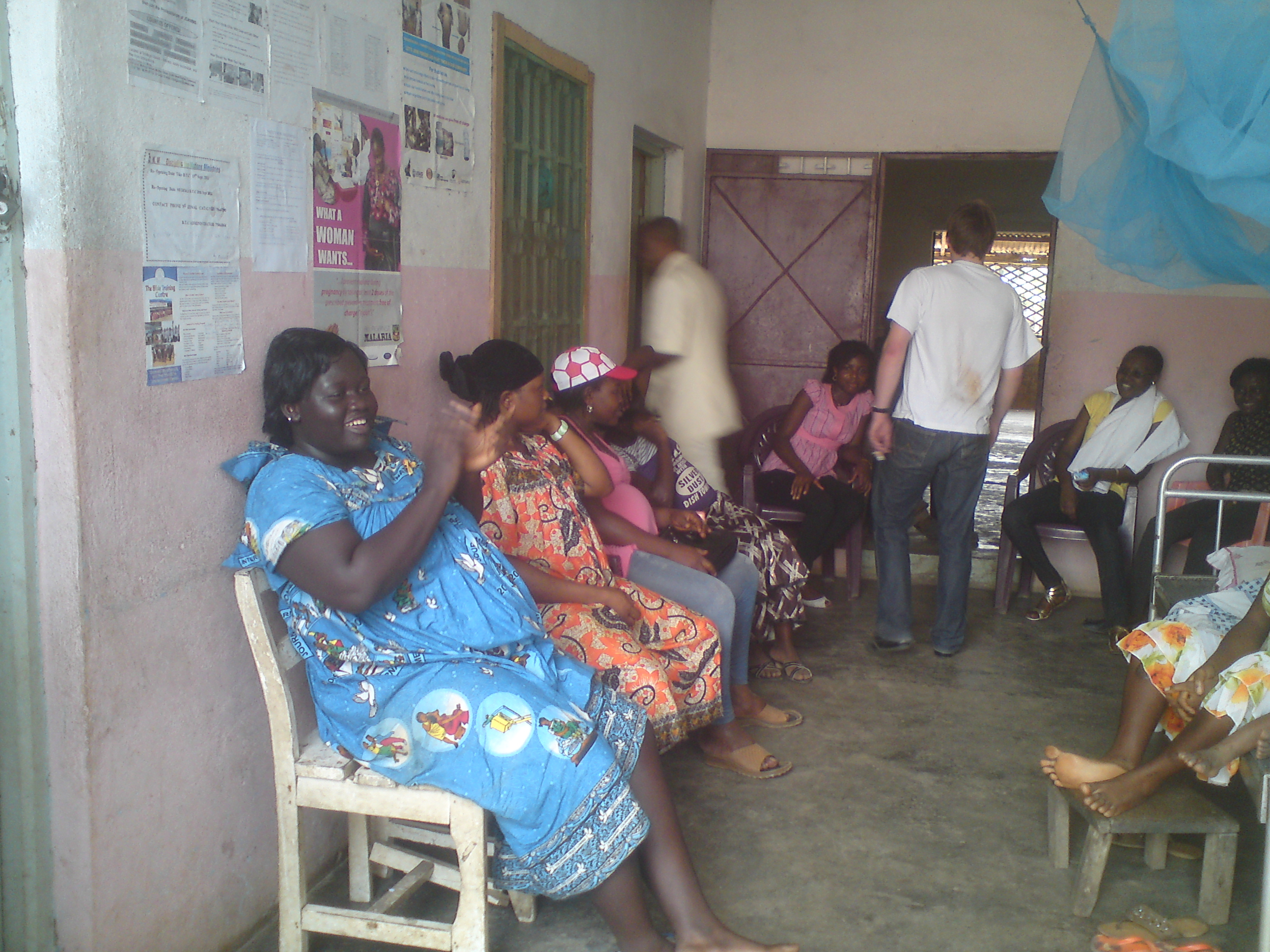
Naigahelp mission in a village hospital

A young girl went to the hospital they worked in, suffering at first only from a small wound suppurating due to an infection. But in consequence of the non-professional wound dressing it couldn't heal and the girl got a sepsis. The two young assistants had recognized the inadequate treatment methods for quite a long time, but it wasn't changed until a Yaoundé surgeon visited the hospital and accomplished an incision and drainage to the wound.

Encouraged by this, the two founders decided to build up their own organization, which should not only distribute medical drugs and equipment to the hospitals, but also provide skill enhancement programs for the hospital stuff, in order to avoid such malpractice in the future.

== Projects and Missions ==
=== Mission structure ===
The main operational hub of the Naigahelp community is the city of Freiburg im Breisgau, Germany. While the European associates are managing the financial aspects, local co-workers organize the field missions in Cameroon and Nigeria.

Most of the projects are carried out in the South West Region in Cameroon, around the town of Buea, but the organisation is also active in Nigeria, where it works on educational und medical missions throughout the country. Through educational missions are students taught how to improve the future with their own ideas. Cooperation includes Taraba, Adamawa, Niger, Kaduna, Akwa Ibom and many other states. It is planned to work on the HIV/Aids prevention also.

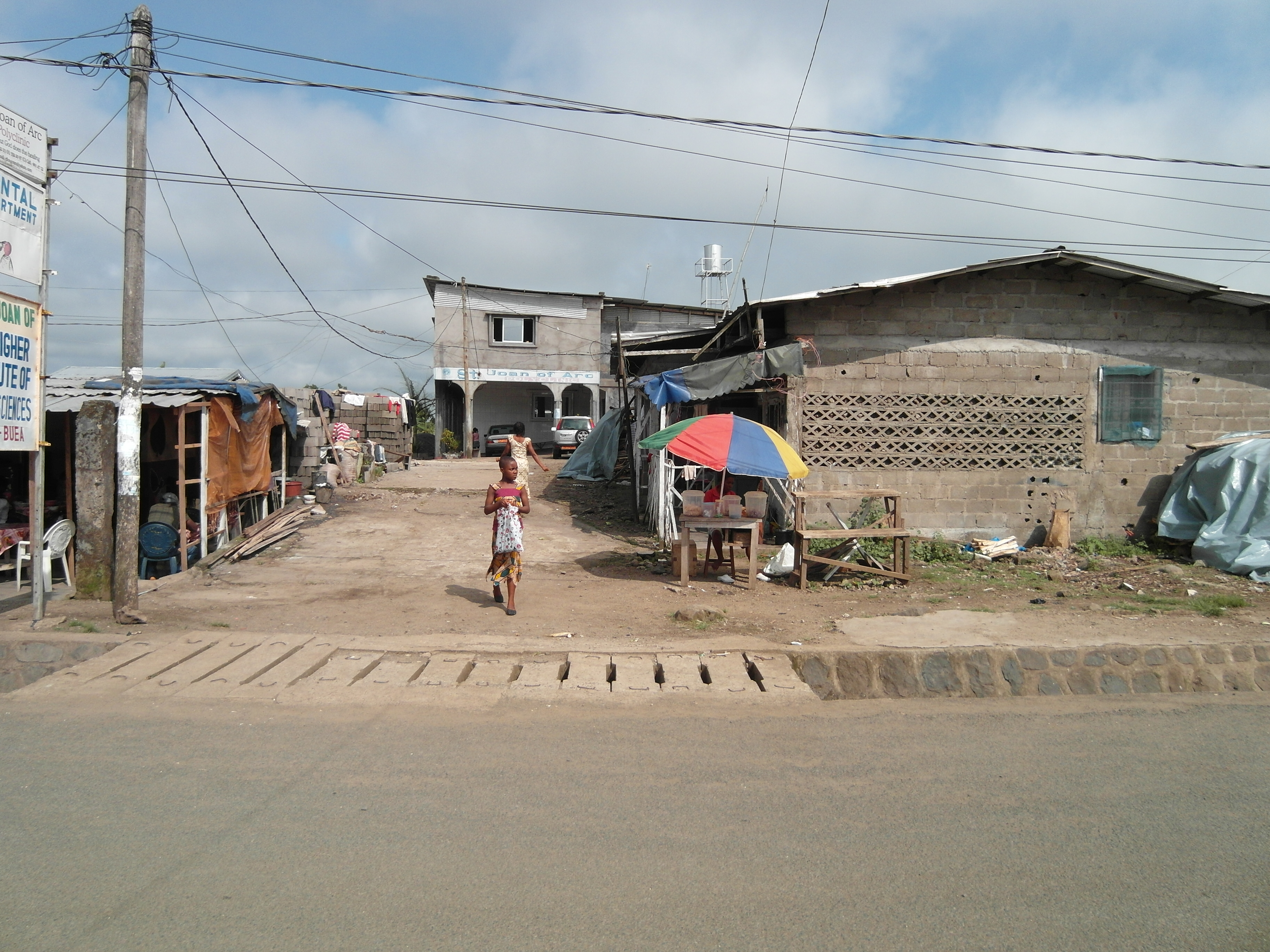
The St. Joan of Arc Higher Institute of Medical Sciences, Buea

Naigahelp has also lined up a range of Volunteer projects for young people who like to do voluntary services in Africa. This includes not only medical missions, but also social projects like work in orphanages or a wildlife centre.

=== Current field missions ===
In January 2012, Naigahelp has sent a big consignment to the ‘’St. Joan of Arc Higher Institute of Medical Sciences’’, Buea, including new echography equipment. Within this, an information campaign about worm diseases was carried out in the area of Fako Division in South West Cameroon.
