= Ewome Eko John =

Chief in Southwest Region, Cameroon

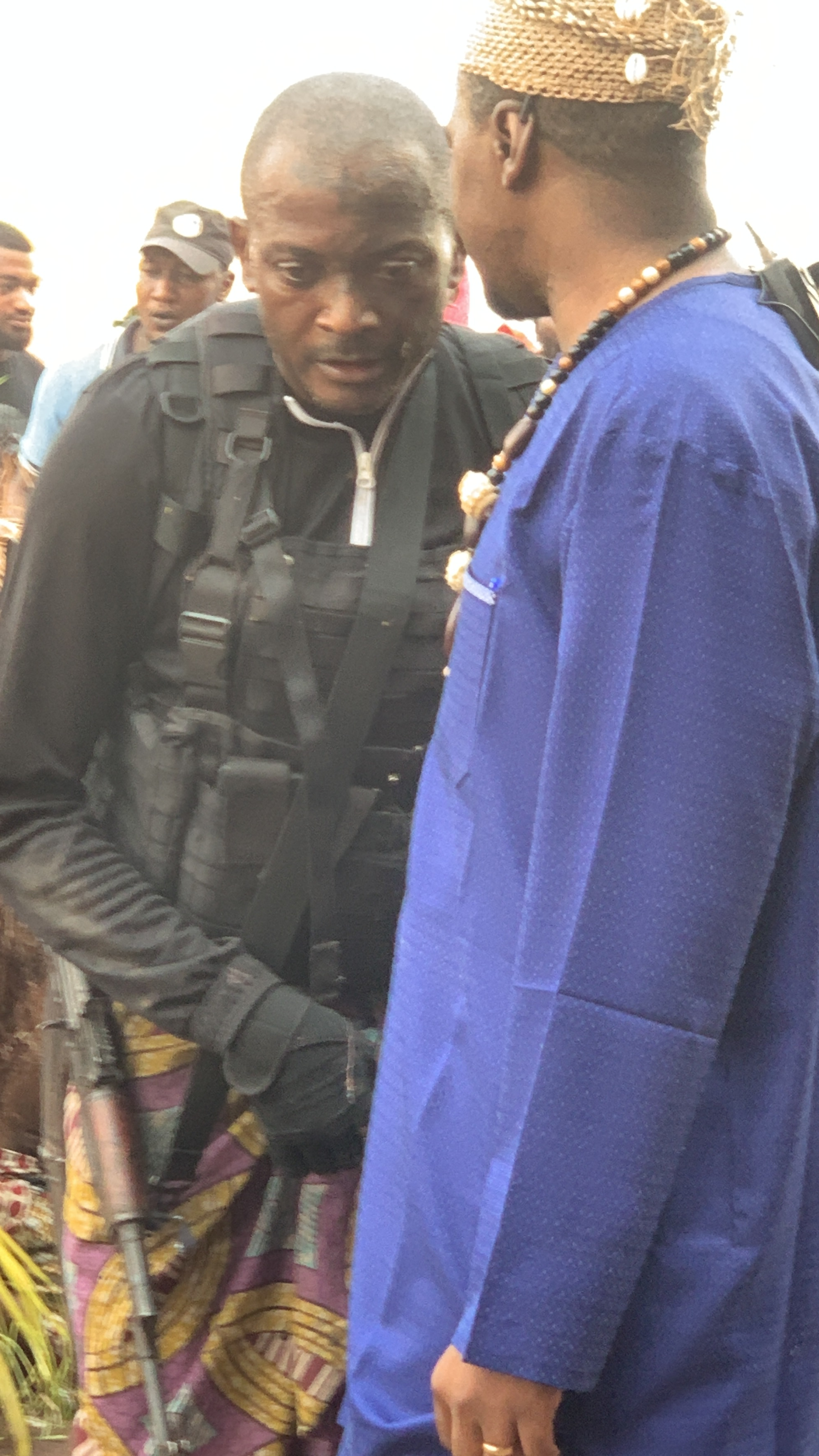
Ewome Eko John “Moja Moja”: Chief of Bwassa

Ewome Eko John, also known as Chief Moja Moja, is a notable figure in Cameroon, particularly in the Southwest Region.

== Birth and early life ==
Ewome Eko John was born in Buea, a town in the Southwest Region of Cameroon. Details about his exact birth date are not widely documented. He grew up in Bwasa village, where he later became the traditional ruler.

== Family ==
Ewome Eko John comes from a lineage of traditional leaders. He succeeded his late father as the chief of Bwasa village.

== Work and achievements ==
Ewome Eko John is known for his dual roles as a traditional leader and a military officer. He served in Cameroon's Rapid Intervention Battalion (BIR), a specialized military unit. However, he was recently reassigned to the infantry due to issues of indiscipline and absenteeism.

As Chief Moja Moja, he has been a controversial figure, often involved in incidents related to hate speech and violence. Despite this, he has recently taken a surprising stand against hate speech, participating in campaigns aimed at promoting peace and unity in Buea.
