= Idenau =

Coordinates: 4°14′N 8°59′E

- Commune and town
- Interactive map of Idenau
- Country: Cameroon
- Region: South-West Region
- Department: Fako County
- District: West Coast
- Time zone: UTC+1 (WAT)
- Climate: Af

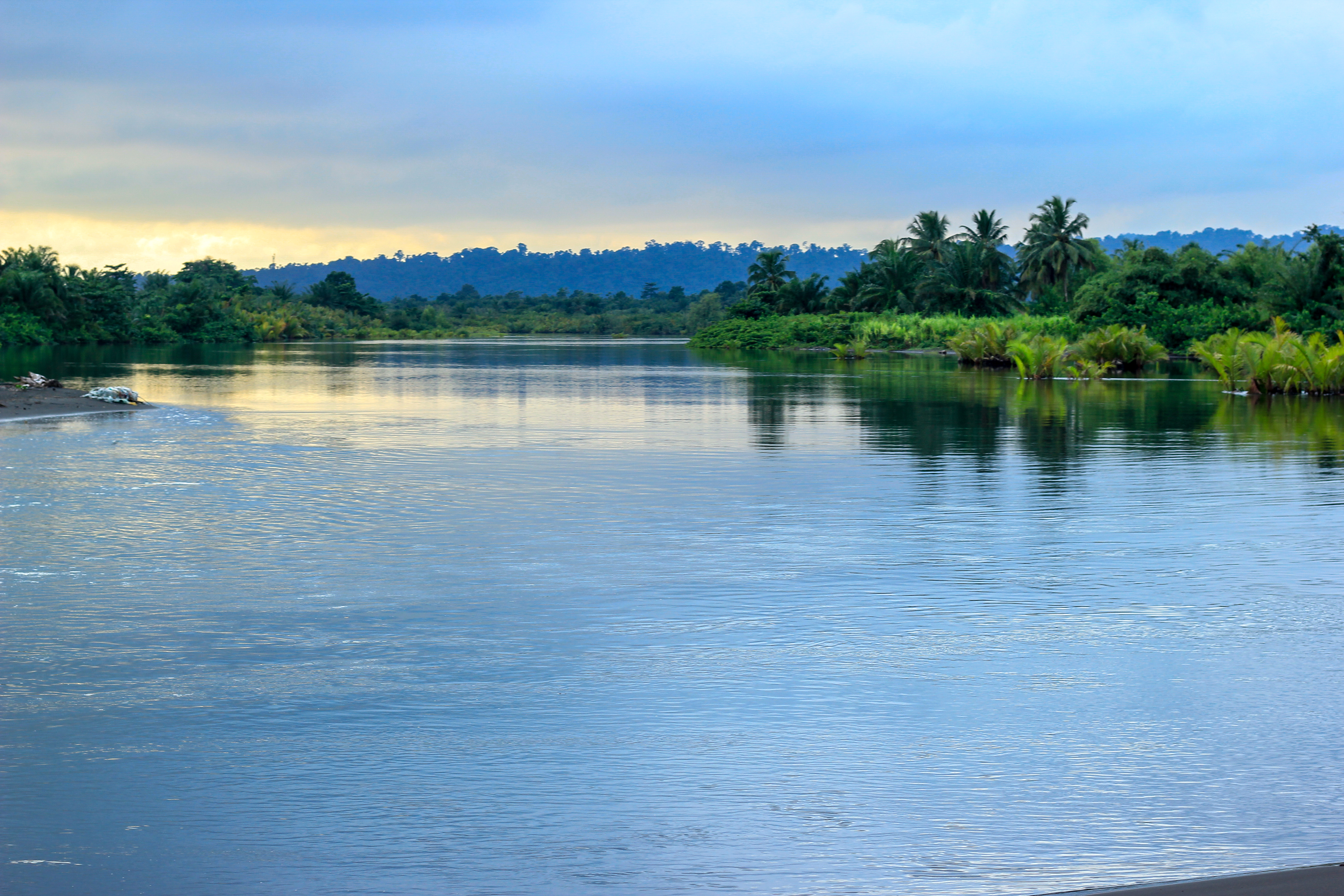
Beautiful Idenua crick

Idenau is a town and capital of the West Coast district in Cameroon, near Bibundi west of Mount Cameroon. The name was given to this place while Cameroon was a German colony.

Today, Idenau has a small harbour and some oil palm plantations.

== Gallery ==
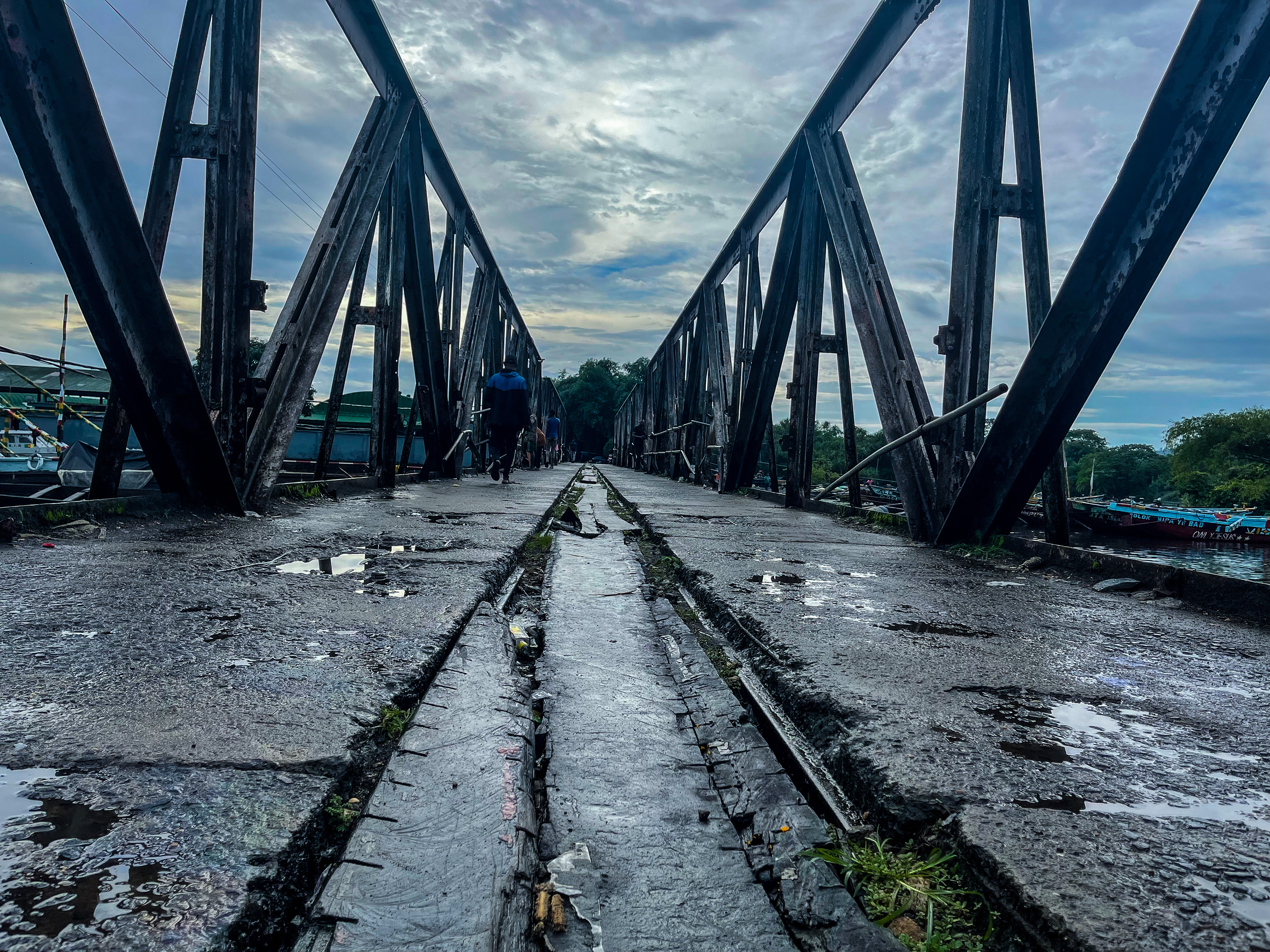
Idenau bridge

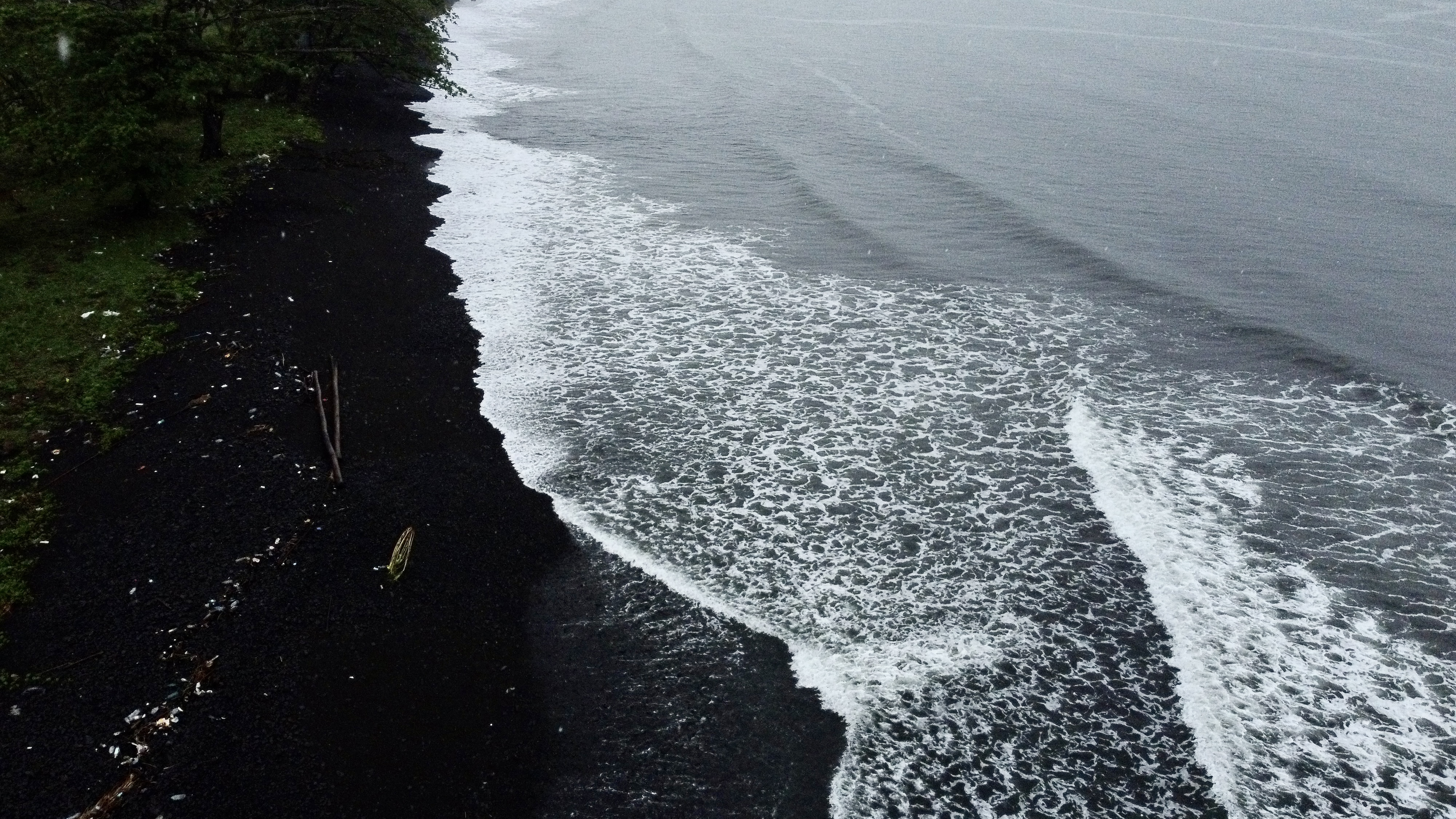
Moland beach. Idenau, Cameroon

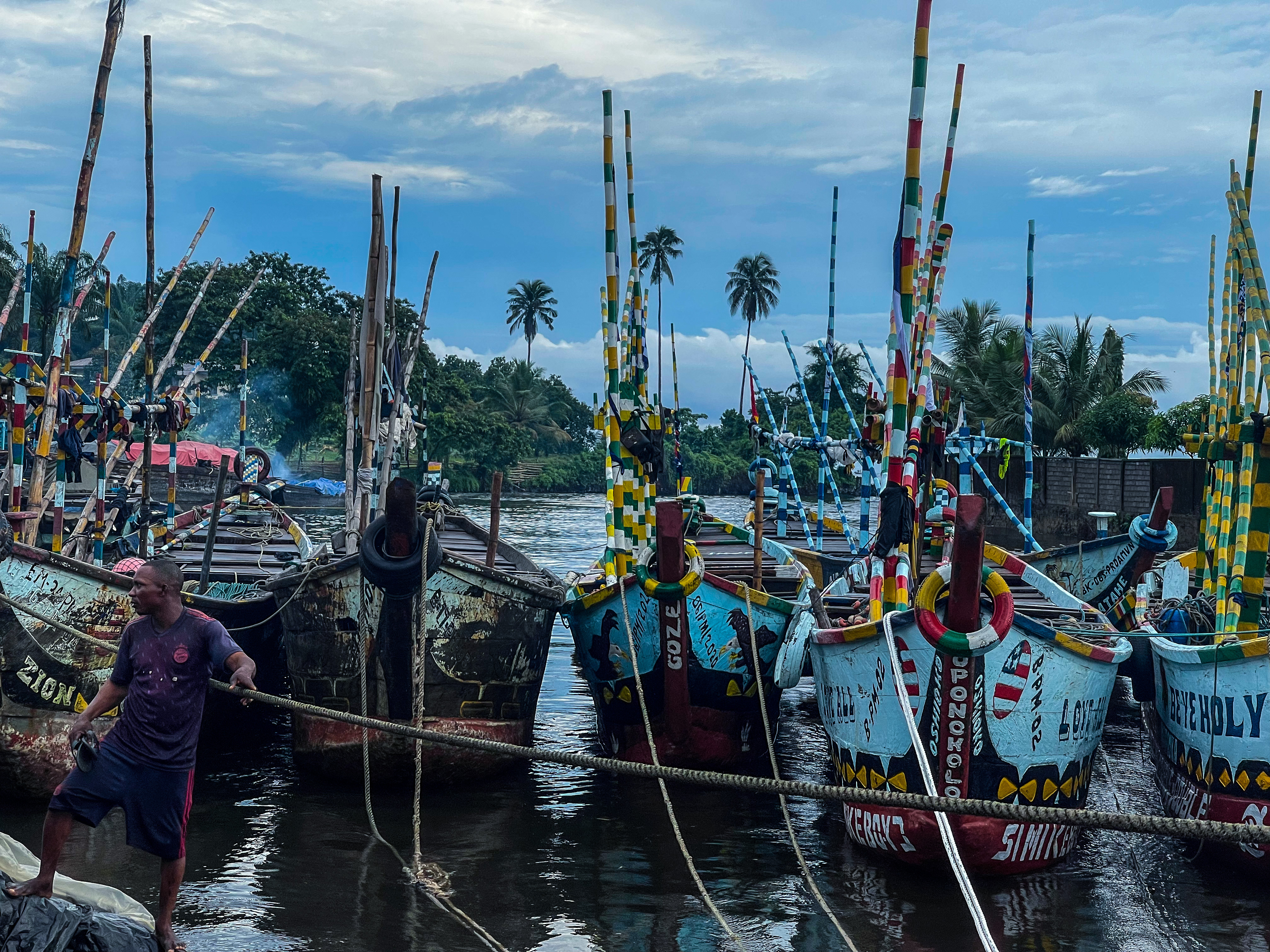
Idenau, Cameroon. Shipping boats

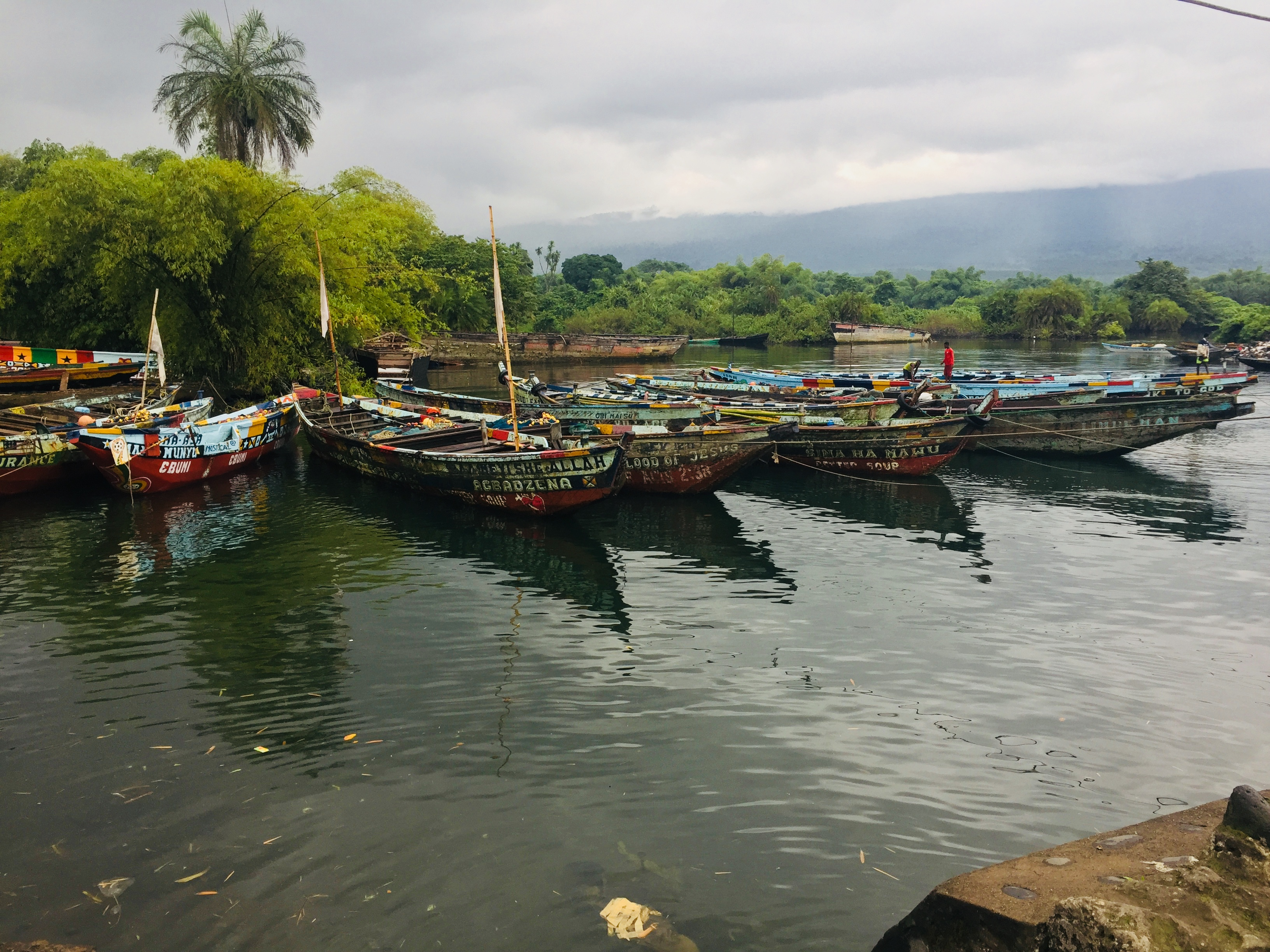
Trees taken from Idenau Beach

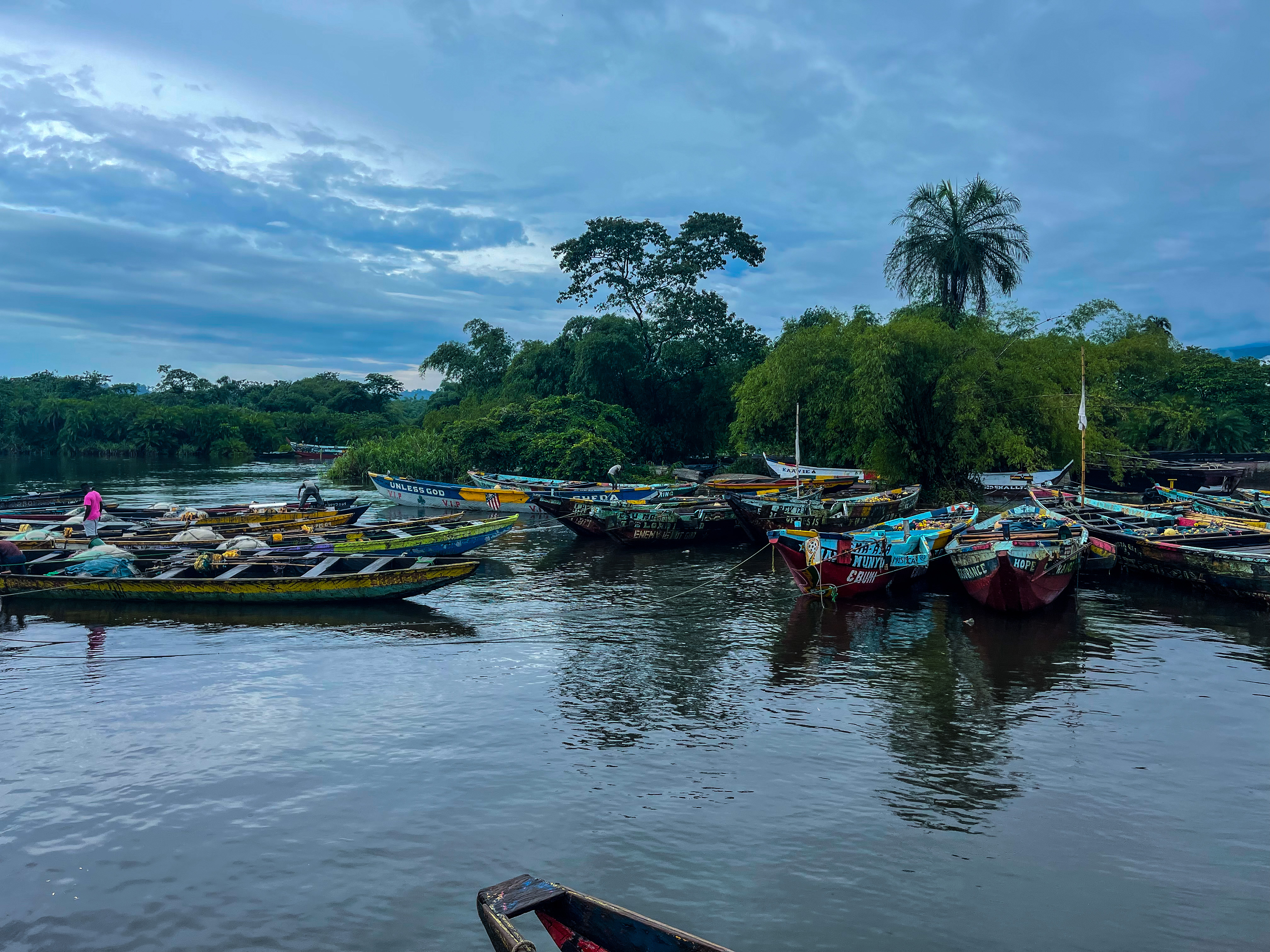
Fishing boats. Idenau, Cameroon

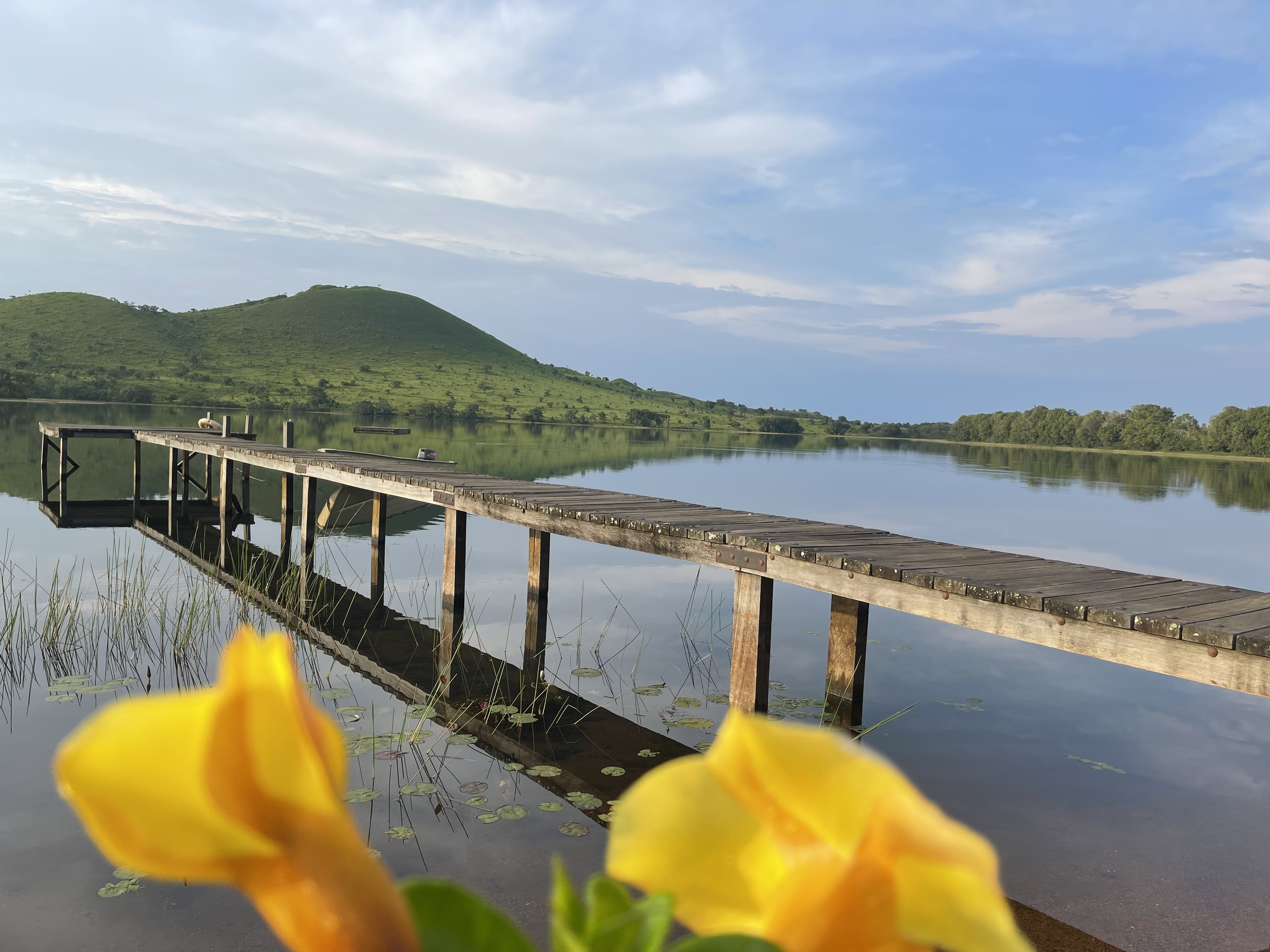
Lake Petpennoun. Foumbot, Cameroon

== See also ==
- Communes of Cameroon
- South-West Region
- Ambazonia
- Limbe, Cameroon
