= Mile 16 =

Neighborhood of Buea, Cameroon

- Town and commune
- Location within Cameroon
- Coordinates: 4°08′35″N 9°18′22″E
- Country: Cameroon
- Region: Southwest Region
- Division: Fako
- Elevation: 870 m (2,850 ft)
- Climate: Cfb

Mile 16, also known as Bolifamba and Bolifamba Mile 16, is a locality in the Buea Municipality of the Fako Division, South West Region of Cameroon.

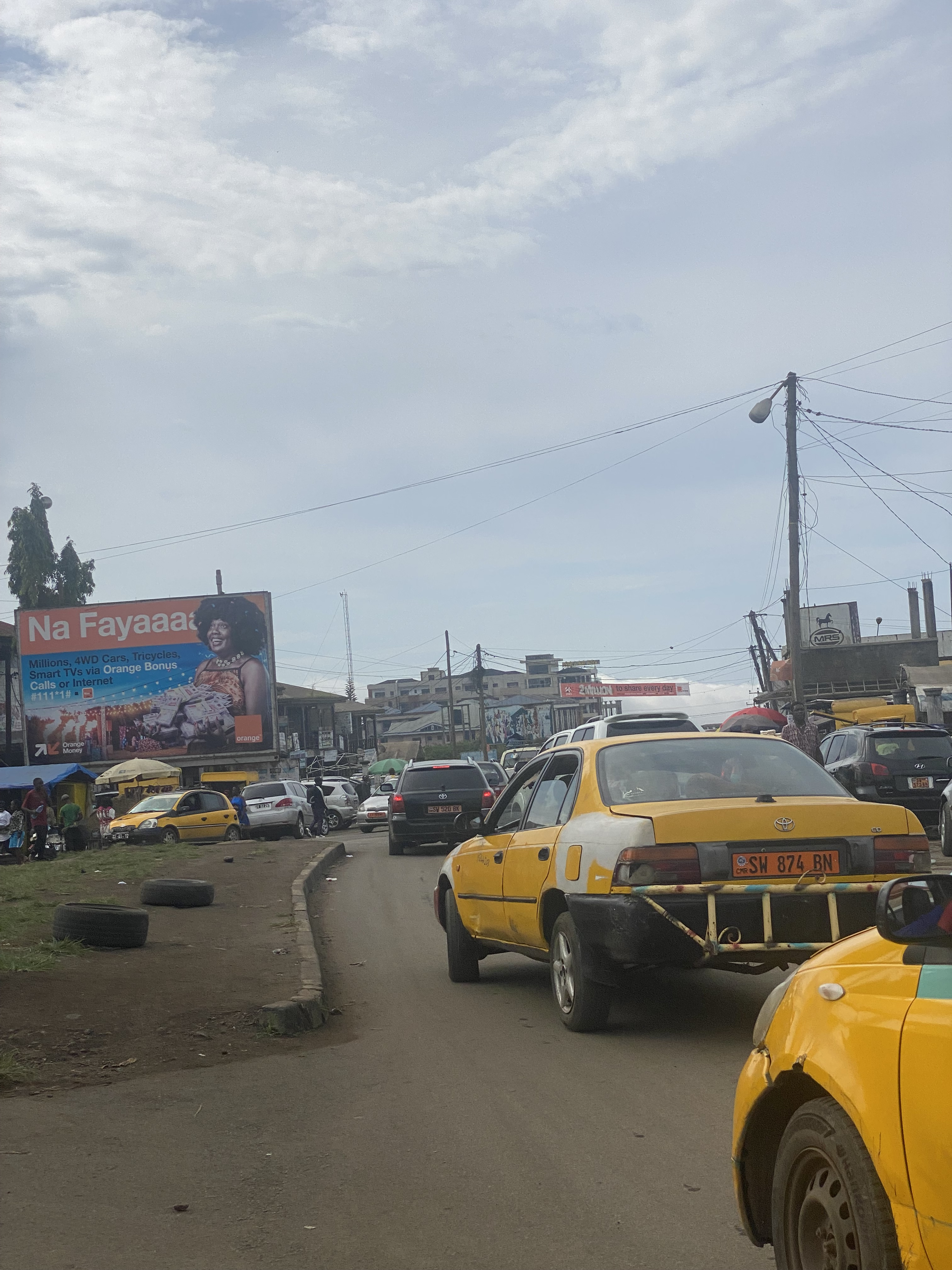
Mile 17, Buea Roundabout exit to Mile 16.

Mile 16 location refers to Highway 8, the first 17 miles of which were tarred in 1952. The University of Buea is also nearby. Originally a separate village, the area has undergone urban sprawl in the 2000s, yet supports peri-urban agriculture. In 2003, the population was approximately 7,000 and in 2019 was approximately 8,000.

== History ==
Bolifamba Mile 16 is a chiefdom in the Buea council area. Violence has led to destruction in area during unrest and conflicts stemming from the Anglophone Crisis, and threats English-speaking population.

== Nearby places ==
- Mile 17
- WDC APARTHOTEL | 5* Luxury Hotel in Cameroon | Buea, South West
- Afrique Con Travel Agencies
- Lobe Cooperative Credit Union LTD| Buea

== See also ==
- Ambazonia
