= Victor Anomah Ngu =

Cameroonian professor and researcher (1926–2011)

- Born: 1926; Buea, Cameroon
- Died: 2011 (aged 84–85)
- Occupations: Professor and researcher
- Spouse: Etso Ugbodaga-Ngu (m. 1960)

Victor Anomah Ngu (1 February 1926 – 14 June 2011) was a Cameroonian professor, researcher and one-time Minister of Public Health. He became famous after inventing VANHIVAX (see Lachenal 2017), a vaccine he affirmed is an immunological solution in the treatment of HIV/AIDS.

In 1960, he married Nigerian artist and teacher Etso Ugbodaga-Ngu.

Ngu died at Yaoundé University Teaching Hospital, CHU, after a protracted illness on 14 June 2011.

== Early years and education ==
Victor Anomah Ngu was born on 1 February 1926 in Buea, Cameroon.

After passing his secondary school days at the prestigious St. Joseph's College, Sasse, Buea, Cameroon; he moved to the University of Ibadan (1948–1950), St Mary’s Hospital Medical School and the University of London (1951–1954).

== Career ==
Professor of Surgery, University of Ibadan (1965–1971); Professor of Surgery, Université de Yaoundé (1971–1974); Vice Chancellor, Université de Yaoundé (1974–1982); President of the Association of African Universities (1981–1982); Minister of Public Health, Government of Cameroon (1984–1988); Director of the Cancer Research Laboratory, Université de Yaoundé (1984–); Founder - Hope Clinic Cameroon (1991)

== Professional career ==
- 1965–1971: Professor at the University of Ibadan
- 1971–1974: Professor at the University of Yaoundé
- 1974–1982: Vice Chancellor of the University of Yaoundé
- 1981–1982: President of the Association of African Universities
- 1984–1988: Minister of Public Health, Cameroon
- 1984: Director of the Cancer Research Laboratory, University of Yaoundé
- 1991: Founded Hope Clinic Cameroon

== Awards ==
Ngu received a number of awards and distinctions, including:

- Grand Commander of the National Order of Valour in Cameroon
- Albert Lasker Medical Research Award in Clinical Cancer Chemotherapy
- Dr. Samuel Lawrence Adesuyi Award and Medal by the West African Health Community
