= Cameroon Press Photo Archive =

Photographic archive in Buea, Cameroon

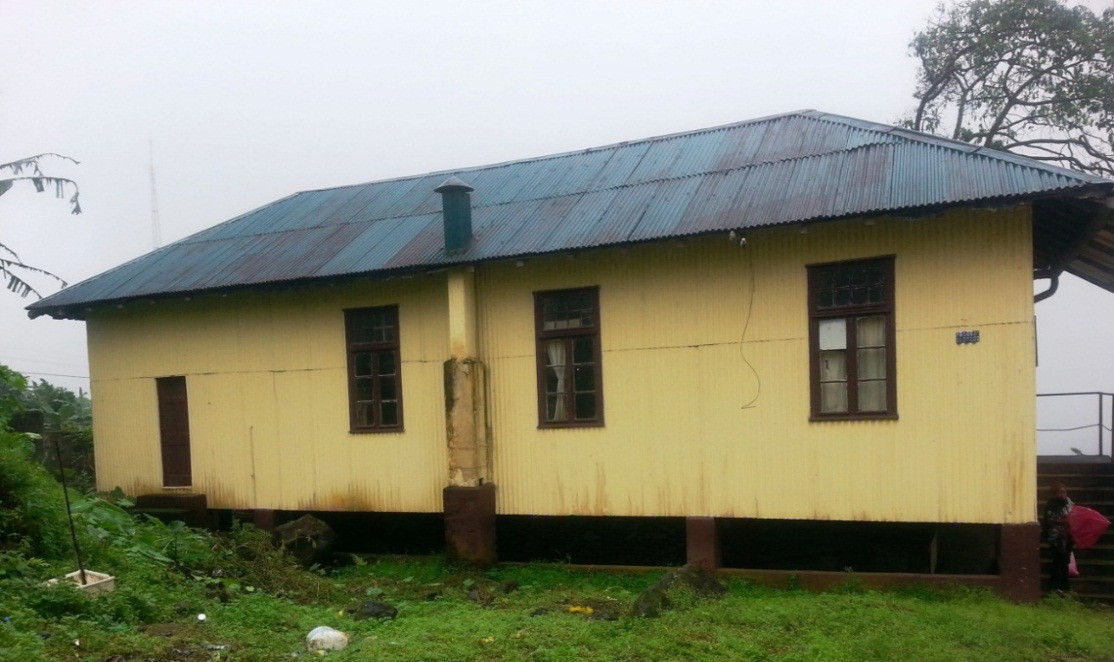
Exterior of the Cameroon Press Photo Archive in Buea

The Cameroon Press Photo Archive (CPPA-B) is a photographic archive located in Buea, the regional capital of the South West Region of Cameroon. It holds around 120,000 negatives and 14,000 proof sheets (templates on which up to 16 contact prints were mounted for the purpose of reference) in total, granting a unique view of Anglophone Cameroon's history for the time period 1955 to 2000. Between 2013 and 2015, African Photography Initiatives digitized 25,000 negatives and all 14,000 proof sheets. A copy of the digitized material is in the possession of the Ministry of Communication, the authority in charge of the photo archive. The CPPA-B is considered an endangered archive.

== History ==
The CPPA-B was founded in 1954 by the British colonial administration when Southern Cameroons was granted quasi regional status and started operating in November 1955. The person responsible for the setting up of the archives (more precisely the Photo Section within the Southern Cameroons Information Service) was Emmanuel Moanga Mbwaye (1928-2016) who had trained as a photographer in the Colonial Film Unit while working with the Cameroon Development Cooperation (C.D.C.) which had been formed in 1947 with the objective of developing and running plantations of tropical crops in Cameroon. Mbwaye worked alone from the early years but was joined in 1961 by Scott Fominyam. The latter was an assistant-photographer to Mbwaye and, in 1974, was transferred to Bamenda to set up the North West regional office of the Photographic Section. Mbwaye was frequently sent out of office to cover events. Scheduling clashes meant he was unable to effectively do the work alone and this necessitated the contracting of studio photographers such as Batanwi Photos (South West in Victoria now Limbe) and CC Sports (North West in Bamenda). The mandate of the photographers of the Press Photo Agency was to follow any governmental or otherwise socially relevant events throughout its territory (today's Northwest and Southwest Regions).

The activities of the Photographic Section continued after 1961 when it became the West Cameroon Photographic Section (part of the Federal Republic) and thereafter, under the United Republic of Cameroon (formed after a referendum in 1972). The photographers working for the Information Service produced not only photographs but also movies, which were subsequently shown by mobile cinemas units in rural and urban areas all over the territory. These movies' primary purpose was the information and education of the population about matters such as health, hygiene or the importance of schooling. These photographers were also responsible for covering the Presidents' and Prime Minister's activities as well as any official events of public interest. From its inception and through the 1980s the Photographic Division was active and able to preside directly over all the phases of photo production, from shooting to development and print.

The first photographer of the Information Service, Emmanuel Moanga Mbwaye, retired in 1987 after being transferred to the Cinematography Division in 1983. Until his retirement, the Photographic Division was well-staffed overall: one librarian, several photographers and two persons in the darkroom worked there full-time. None of these were replaced after retirement. As a result, the photographic archives have been left with progressively fewer staff and remained practically abandoned at the beginning of 2001, when the last photographer retired.

Since 2001, the CPPA-B has been permanently closed. Under such conditions, photographic archives are at constant risk as they are exposed to factors of deterioration such as humidity, termite infestation and air pollution.

== Premises ==
The premises of the CPPA-B is part of the old administrative centre of Buea Town and located in an old wooden colonial building. The administrative organ responsible for the management of the CPPA-B is the Ministry of Communication whose Regional Delegation's office is nearby. The building next to the CPPA-B hosts the National Archives Buea, which is under the authority of the Ministry of Arts and Culture. With the abolition of the Federal system in 1975, Cameroon's national archives were centralised in Yaoundé, the capital of the United Republic of Cameroon. The photographs (negatives, contact prints and proof sheets) which are kept in the CPPA-B cover the years from November 1955 to 2000. With the retirement of the last photographer who worked in that service in 2001, the CPPA-B was locked down and abandoned. Some renovations of the exterior were carried out on the building just a few days before the celebration of the 50th anniversary of the reunification of Anglophone and Francophone Cameroon in February 2014. Inside the building itself, however, nothing was done. In its present state, the CPPA-B lacks the building integrity, security, fire protection, and air quality control that are basic requirements for a long-term archive.

== Contents ==
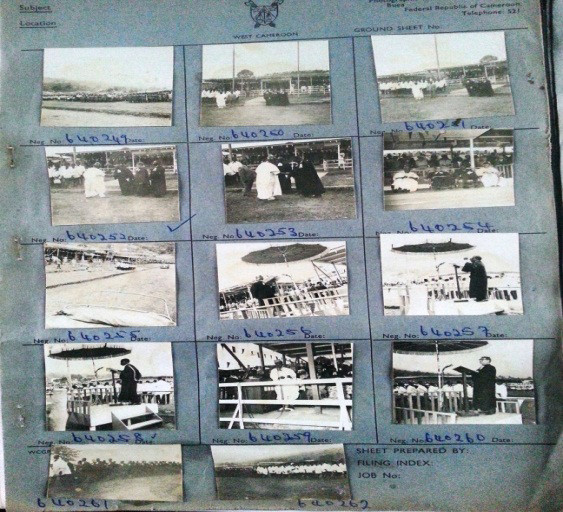
One of the proof sheets held in the archive

Due to the rigorous system of archiving put in place by the British administration in the mid-50s, which was maintained by the archive's librarian, Martha Mosinga, after independence, the contents of the CPPA-B are in relatively good shape. However, under the present climatic conditions the holdings are jeopardised by high humidity and temperatures. The Archives contain approximately 120,000 negatives, 14,000 proof sheets (templates on which up to 16 contact prints were mounted for the purpose of reference) and 12 register books. Generally, approximately 500 negatives that are packed in paper envelopes are stored in small wooden boxes. Some of the negatives in the CPPA-B present visual evidence of events such as, among many others, the Governor General's tour of the Southern Cameroons in December 1957, the Premier's arrival from the UNO Conference in New York City on 16 March 1959, United Nations Secretary General Dag Hammarskjöld's arrival at Tiko airport from Yaoundé, views of Victoria's Barclays Bank building, and the Commonwealth Youth Sunday Celebrations in Buea and Victoria.

== Access ==
To gain access to the Press Photo Archives in Buea one is required to write an application to the corresponding authorities. There are no hard copies of photographic prints as the archives contain only negatives and proof sheets. There is no equipment to print the negatives. It is also difficult to access the material that was digitised by African Photography Initiatives with support from the British Library's Endangered Archives Program and the Swiss Federal Office of Culture. With the support of a team six Cameroonians and in collaboration with the Ministry of Communication between 2013 and 2015, over 25,000 negatives and 14,000 proof sheets were digitised, a database established and conservation measures carried out. There is a pending offer of the British Library to make the digitised material available on their website but permission by the Ministry of Communication had not been granted by early 2017. Bamenda and Buea Universities have requested copies but no permission for this was yet forthcoming.

This impasse resulted in the Yaoundé Declaration of November 9, 2016 through which African Photography Initiatives and other subscribers intended to generate a greater understanding of the value of photographs and films and analogue as well as digital archives for the studies in historic, human and social sciences. The declaration calls on the government and other stakeholders in Cameroon to make every effort in order to protect and make accessible for public use the country's photographic and cinematographic heritage. As a first step, the Yaoundé Declaration recommends the recognition of the CPPA-B and the National Photo Library Yaoundé as cultural property as intended in the law on Cultural Heritage in Cameroon from 18 April 2013.
