= Buea =

Capital of Southwest Region, Cameroon

- Town and commune
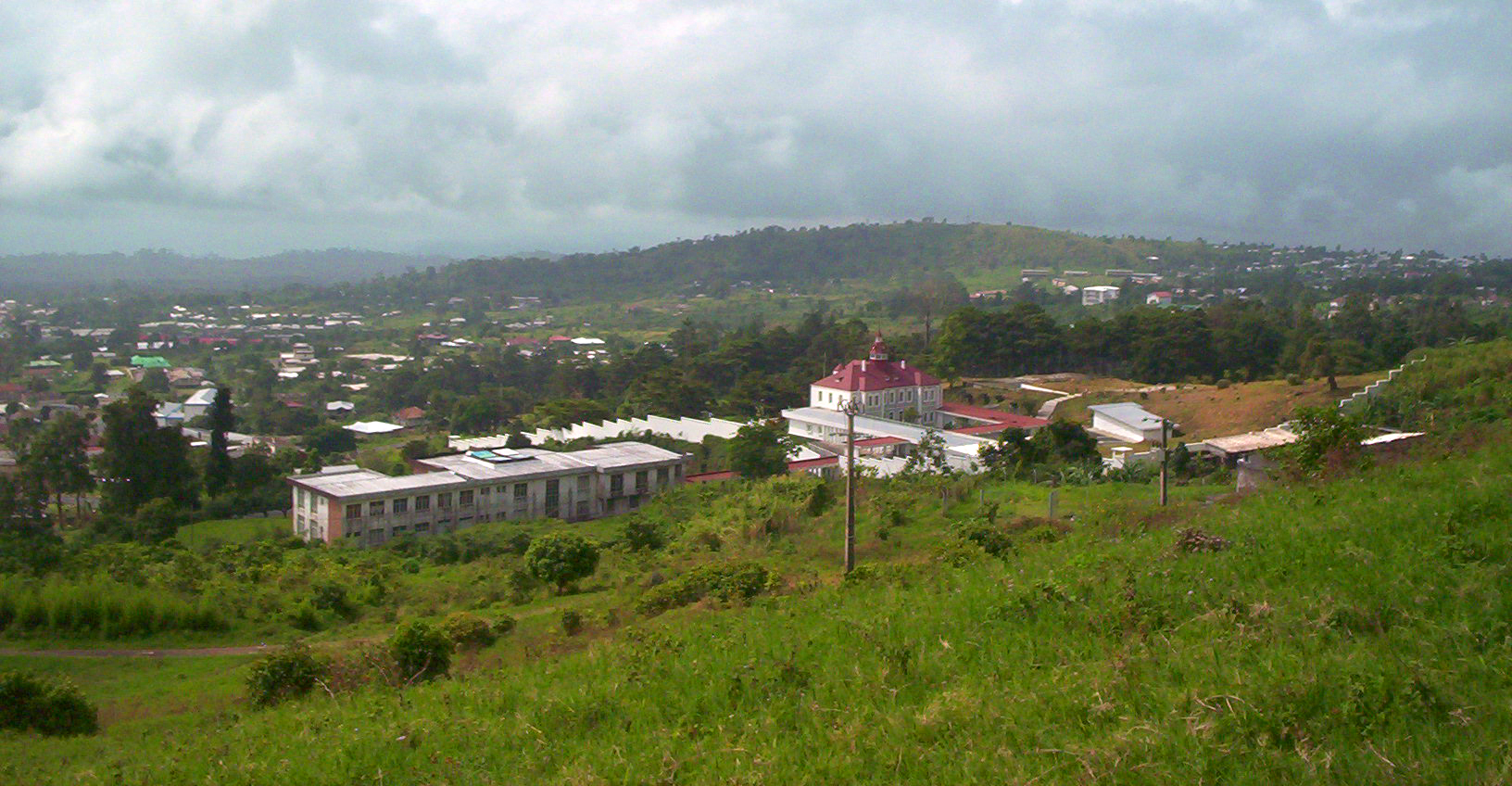
- Buea from the foot of Mount Cameroon

- Location within Cameroon
- Coordinates: 4°10′0″N 9°14′0″E
- Country: Cameroon
- Region: Southwest Region
- Division: Fako
- Elevation: 870 m (2,850 ft)

Population (2013)
  - Total: about 300,000
- Climate: Cfb

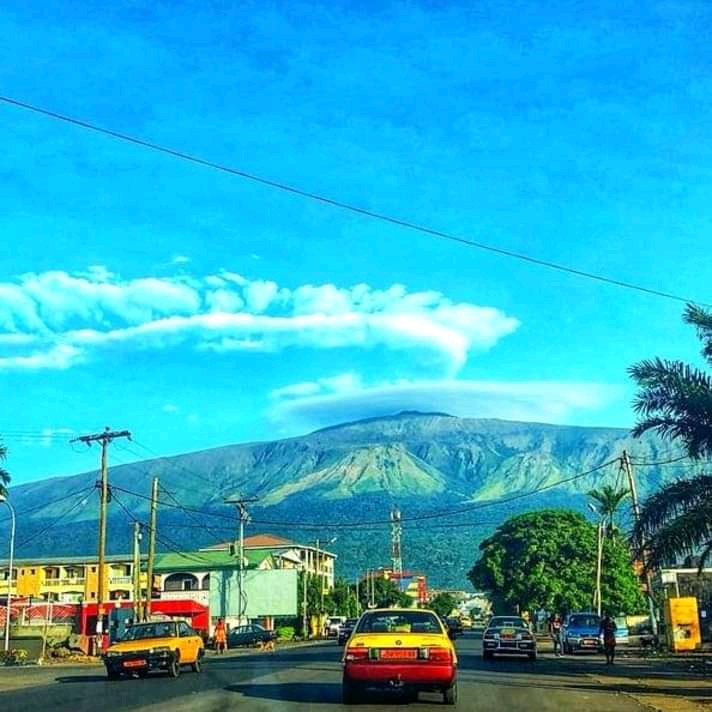
Buea city with a view of Mt Cameroon

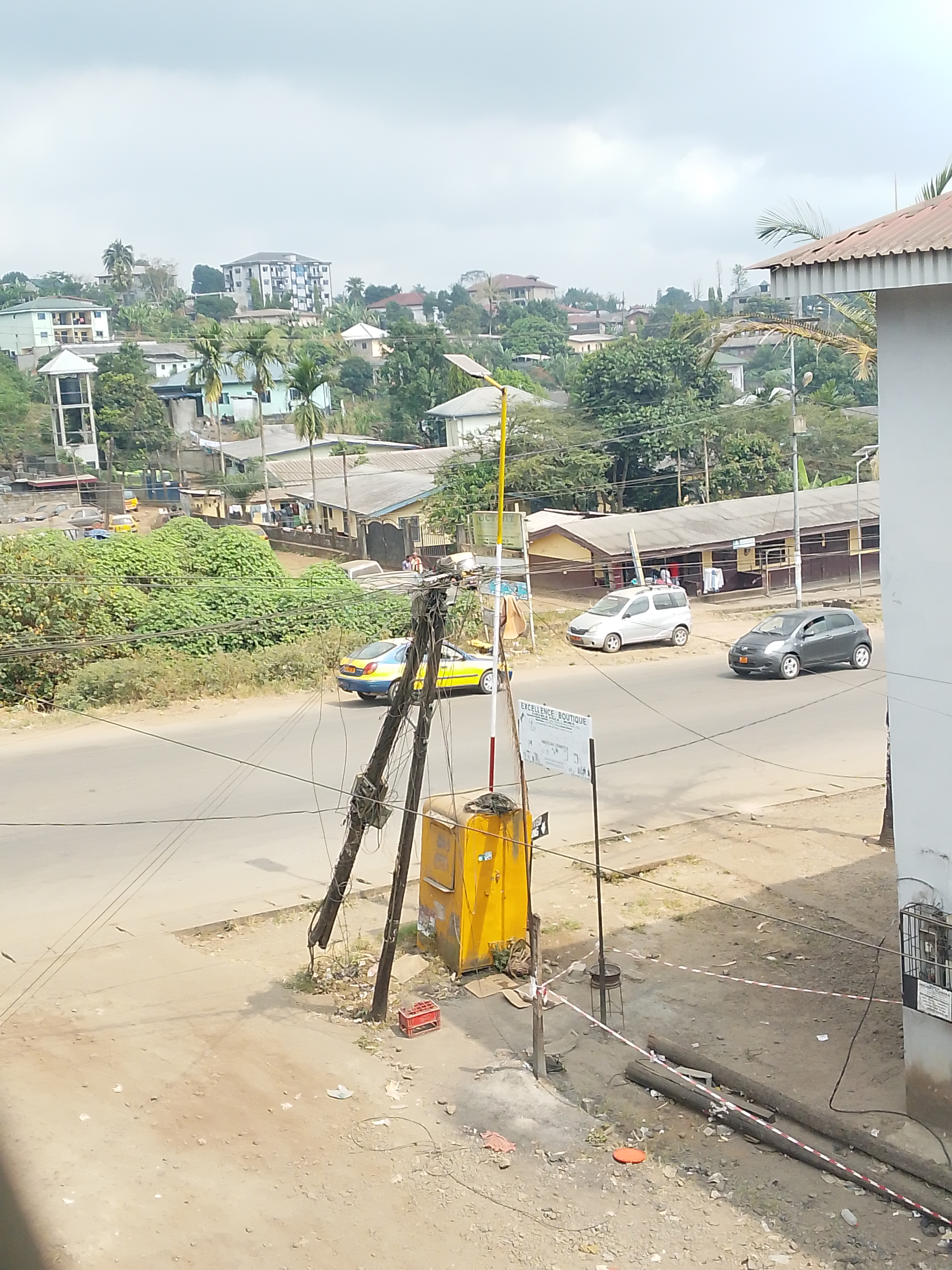
Empty street in Buea On Monday

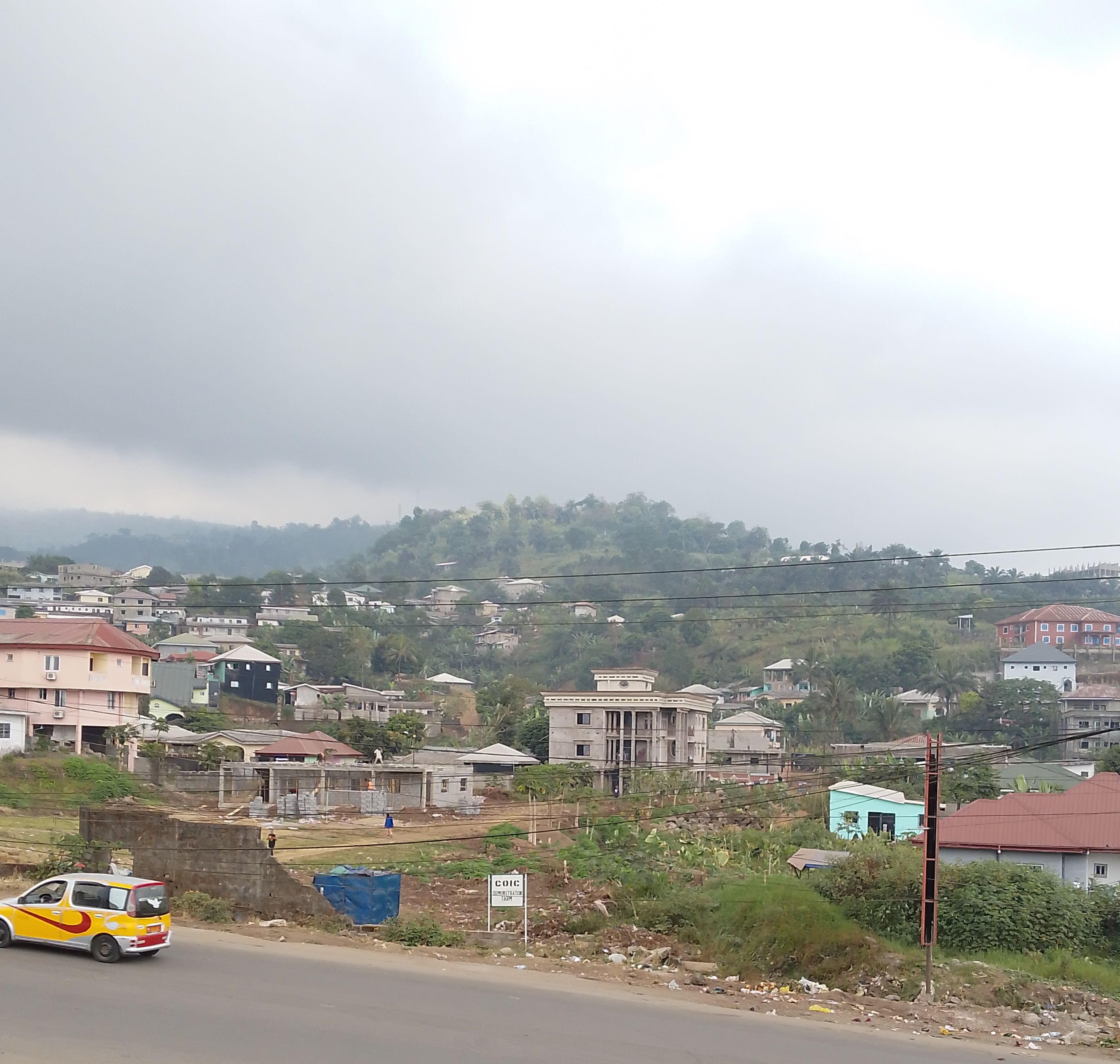
How houses are constructed in Buea

Buea is the capital of the Southwest Region of Cameroon. The city is located in Fako Division, on the eastern slopes of Mount Cameroon, and has a population of about 47,300 inhabitants as of 2025. It has two Government Hotels, the Mountain Hotel and Parliamentarian Flats Hotel located around The Government Residential Area.

== History ==
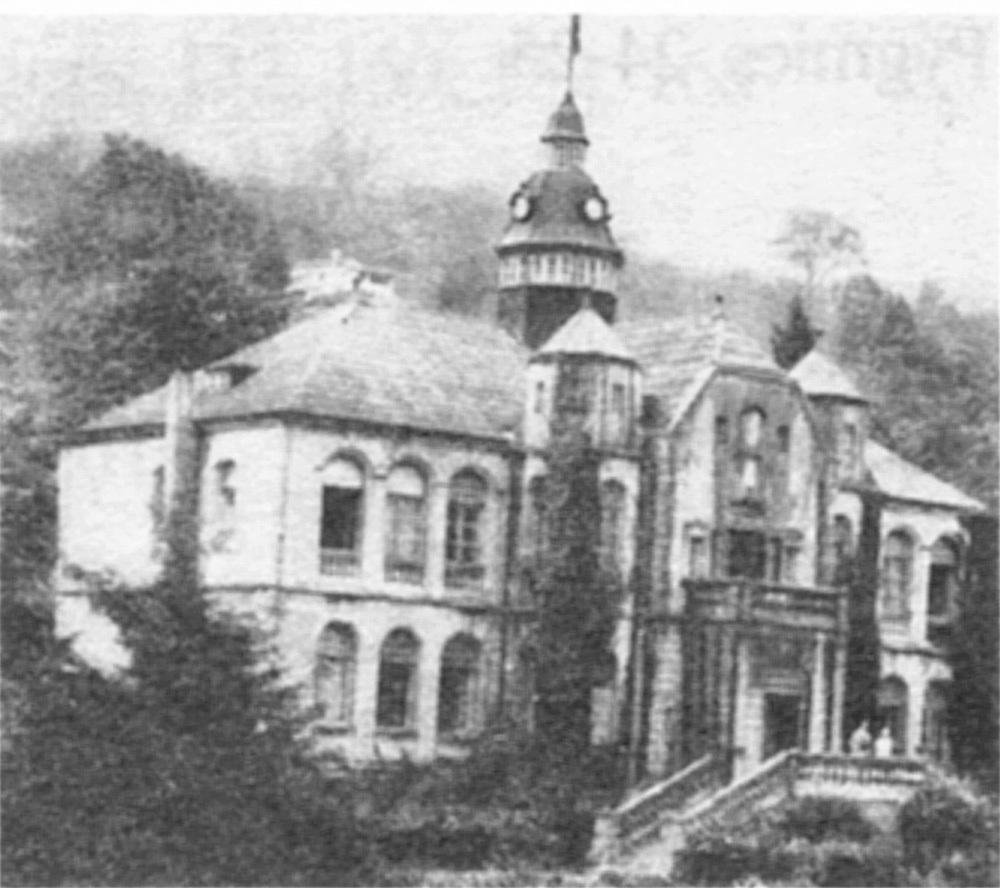
The Residence of von Puttkamer in Buea

Buea, originally "bue", was founded by a hunter who came from the Bomboko area. Coming from the Bomboko side of the mountain, he named the new-found land in amazement as "a Bue", meaning literally a "son of bué". A prominent King of the tikar clashes with German troops during invasion. Resistance remain popular folklore; currently ruled by the Endeleys. Tea growing is an important local industry, especially in Tole. Buea was the colonial capital of German Kamerun from 1901 to 1919, the capital of the Southern Cameroons from 1949 until 1961 and the capital of West Cameroon until 1972, when Ahmadou Ahidjo abolished the Federation of Cameroon. The German colonial administration in Buea was temporarily suspended during the eruption of Mount Cameroon from 28 April until June 1909. Originally, Buea's population consisted mainly of the Bakweri people. However, owing to its status as a university town and the regional capital, there are significant numbers of other ethnic groups.

=== Ambazonian secession ===
In September 2017, the Federal Republic of Ambazonia declared its independence from Cameroon, with Buea as its claimed capital. In late-June 2018, the Ambazonia Defence Forces began approaching Buea, and on 29 June they invaded the Mile 16 neighborhood. On 1 July, separatists invaded the Muea neighborhood and battled Cameroonian troops.

== Notable institutions ==
Buea hosts the University of Buea, Cameroon's first anglophone university. It is the site of several other higher institutes of learning, including St Francis Schools of Nursing and Midwifery presently known as Biaka University Institute of Buea (BUIB) and one of Cameroon's three Catholic universities.

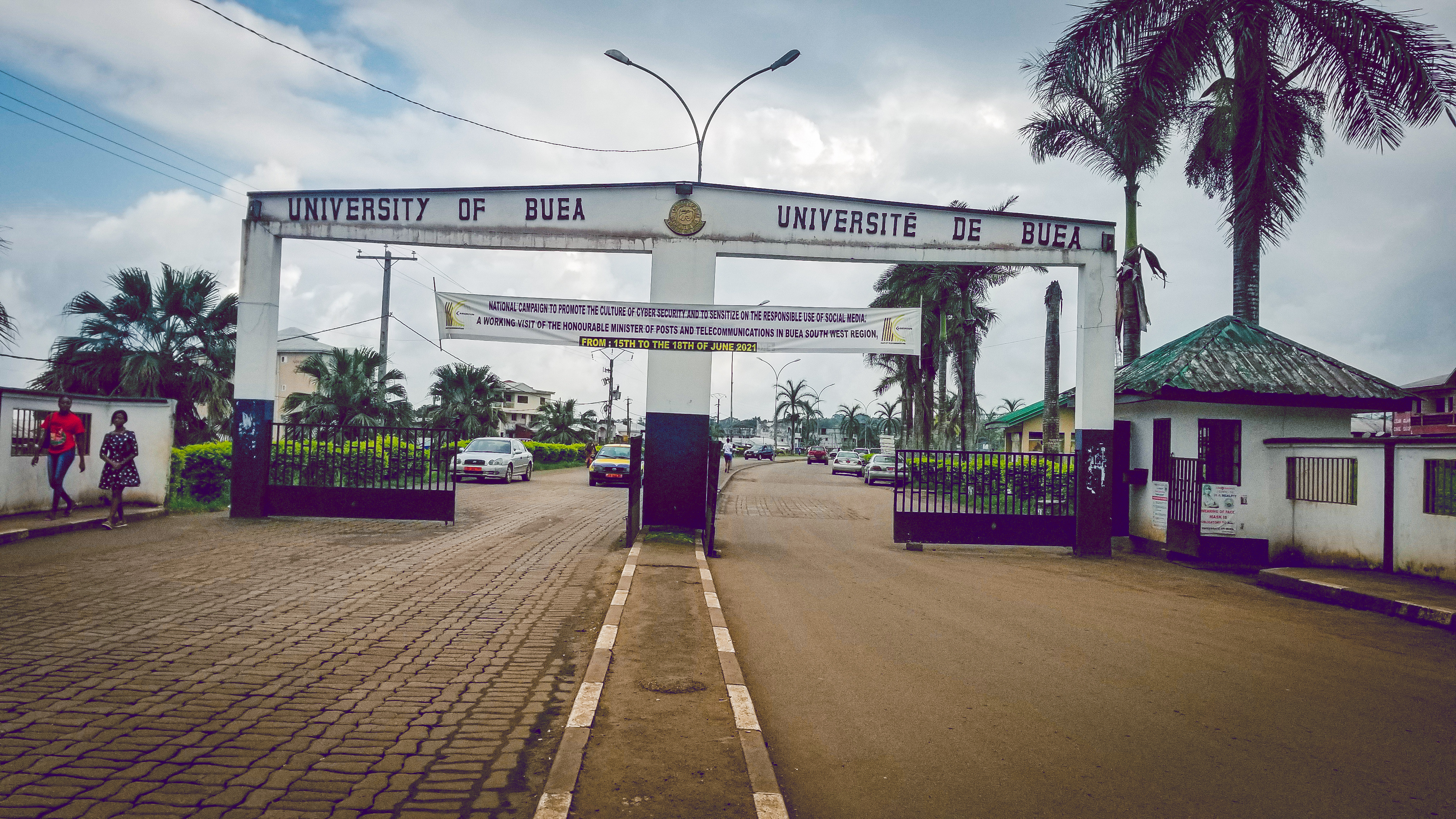
UB Junction

A handful of colonial era buildings are surviving, notably the palatial former residence of the German governor Jesko von Puttkamer. Other German colonial buildings are still standing, but some of them suffer from lack of maintenance and old age.

The Nigerian Consulate in anglophone Cameroon and the main operational hub of the Naigahelp medical aid organisation are in Buea.

Buea hosts an annex of the National Archives of Cameroon, whose main location is Yaoundé. Next door to the annex is the Cameroon Press Photo Archive, which has been permanently closed since 2001.

== Economy ==
The economy of Buea is heavily influenced by its status as a technology hub. Many young people come to the town to study at the University of Buea, and this has created a thriving environment for experimentation, innovation and risk-taking. As a result, the town has become a hotspot for startups, particularly in the technology sector.

The University of Buea's influence has also attracted investors to the town, leading to the establishment of various tech incubators and hubs. For instance, LimbeLabs, which was founded around 2006–2008, was a precursor to ActivSpaces, one of the leading tech hubs in the country. ActivSpaces was launched in 2009 by Ebot Tabi, Bill Zimmerman, Valery Colong, Otto Akama, and Fua Tse. The hub currently has Rebecca Enonchong as Chairman.

Buea's status as a technology hub has also had a positive impact on the town's tourism industry. Mount Cameroon is a popular attraction for tourists, and the town's proximity to the mountain has made it a preferred destination for visitors who want to explore the mountain and its surroundings.

In addition, the town's small size makes it easy to meet and connect with people. It also has considerably light traffic congestion, which makes it easy to move around the town quickly. The proximity of Buea to Douala, which has the largest seaport and the international airport, has also made it an attractive location for businesses.

== Transport ==
Transportation to Buea is possible by land with the use of transport buses or private cars. Within Buea, the primary means of transportation are taxis. The closest airport is the Tiko Airport, however due to its lack of activity and proper infrastructure management, the Douala International Airport (DLA), is the most accessible.

Limbe was served by a 600 mm (1 ft 11 5/8 in) gauge plantation railway to Limbe, of the West African Planting Society Victoria.

== Geography ==
About 300,000 people live in Buea (including the villages of Bokwaongo, Muea; Bomaka; Tole; Mile 16 (Bolifamba); Mile 17; Mile 15; Mile 14 (Dibanda); Bova; Bonjongo; Likombe; Buasa; Great Soppo; Molyko; Small Soppo; Bwitingi; Mile 18 (Wonyamavio); Lower farms; Bokwai; Bonduma; Sandpit, Wonyamongo, Bulu; Bokova and surrounding villages).

=== Climate ===
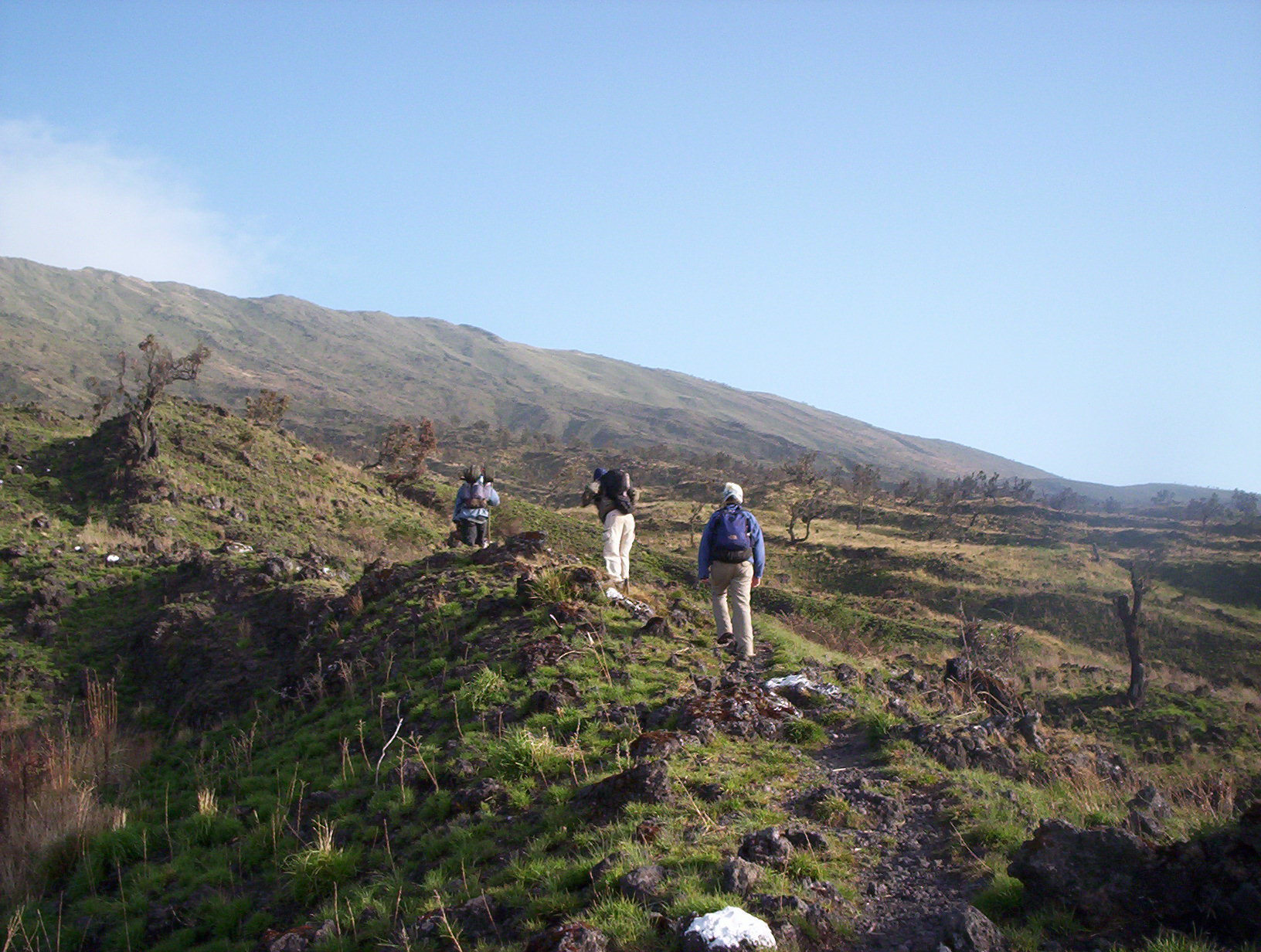
Tourists climbing Mount Fako in Buea

Buea has a subtropical highland climate (Köppen Cfb) closely bordering on a tropical rainforest climate (Af). The average high temperature is about 70 °F or 21.1 °C and the average low around 61 °F or 16.1 °C, with the hottest month being February and the coldest August. It has an average monthly rainfall of 14.7 inches or 370 millimetres.

Because of its location at the foot of Mount Fako, the climate in Buea tends to be humid, with neighbourhoods at higher elevations enjoying cooler temperatures while lower neighbourhoods experience a hotter climate. Extended periods of rainfall, characterized by incessant drizzle, which can last for weeks, are common during the rainy season as are damp fogs, rolling off the mountain into the town below.

Climate data for Buea
Month	Jan	Feb	Mar	Apr	May	Jun	Jul	Aug	Sep	Oct	Nov	Dec	Year
Mean daily maximum °C (°F)	21.6 (70.9)	22.1 (71.8)	22.1 (71.8)	21.9 (71.4)	21.3 (70.3)	19.7 (67.5)	18.8 (65.8)	18.6 (65.5)	19.4 (66.9)	20.2 (68.4)	21.0 (69.8)	21.2 (70.2)	20.7 (69.2)
Daily mean °C (°F)	18.3 (64.9)	18.9 (66.0)	19.0 (66.2)	19.0 (66.2)	18.6 (65.5)	17.4 (63.3)	16.6 (61.9)	16.5 (61.7)	17.0 (62.6)	17.7 (63.9)	18.2 (64.8)	18.2 (64.8)	18.0 (64.3)
Mean daily minimum °C (°F)	16.2 (61.2)	16.8 (62.2)	17.2 (63.0)	17.3 (63.1)	17.1 (62.8)	16.1 (61.0)	15.4 (59.7)	15.3 (59.5)	15.7 (60.3)	16.2 (61.2)	16.6 (61.9)	16.3 (61.3)	16.3 (61.4)
Average rainfall mm (inches)	80 (3.1)	114 (4.5)	235 (9.3)	292 (11.5)	339 (13.3)	417 (16.4)	561 (22.1)	570 (22.4)	504 (19.8)	459 (18.1)	248 (9.8)	101 (4.0)	3,920 (154.3)
Source: Climate-Data.org

== Gallery ==
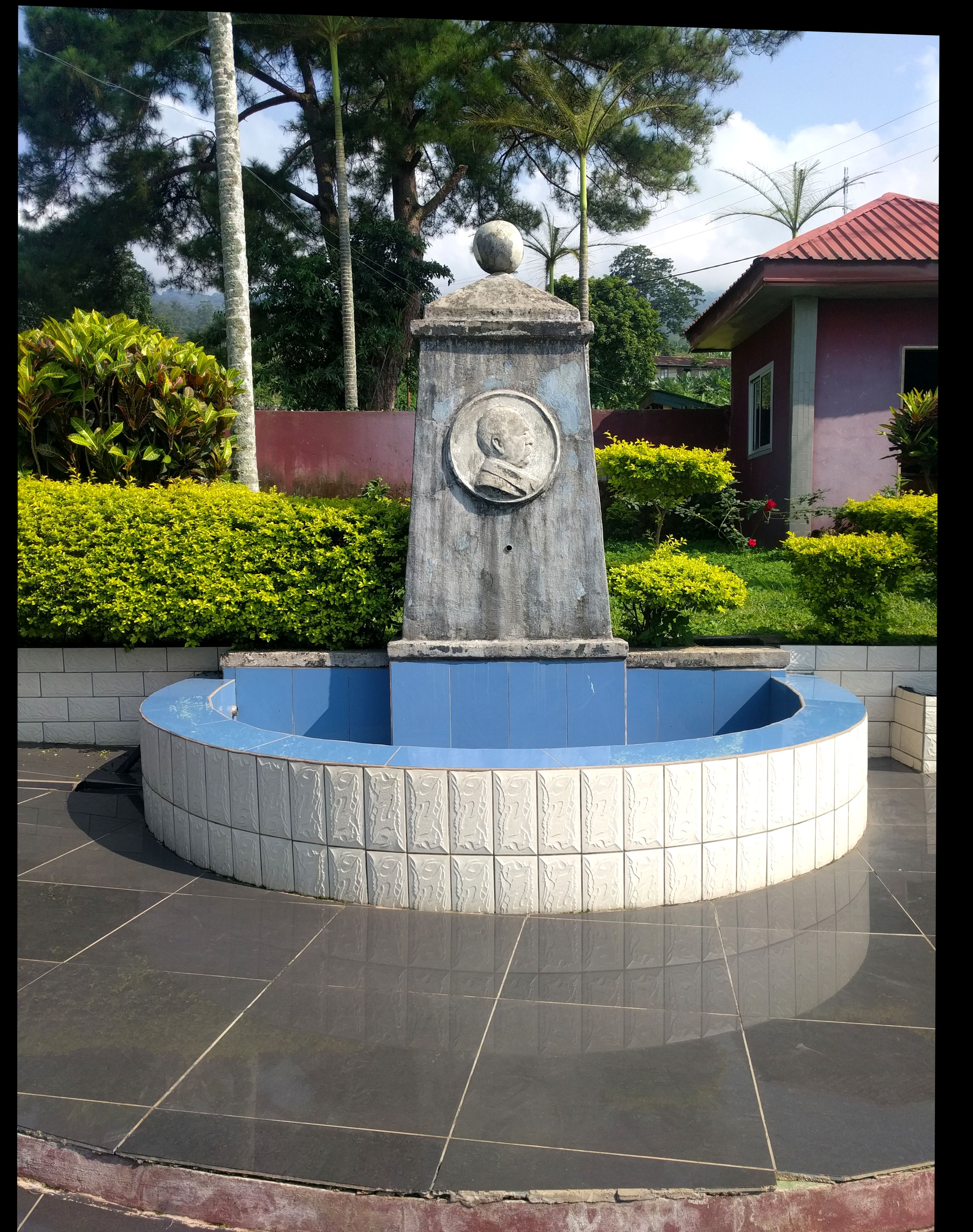
Bismarck Fountain

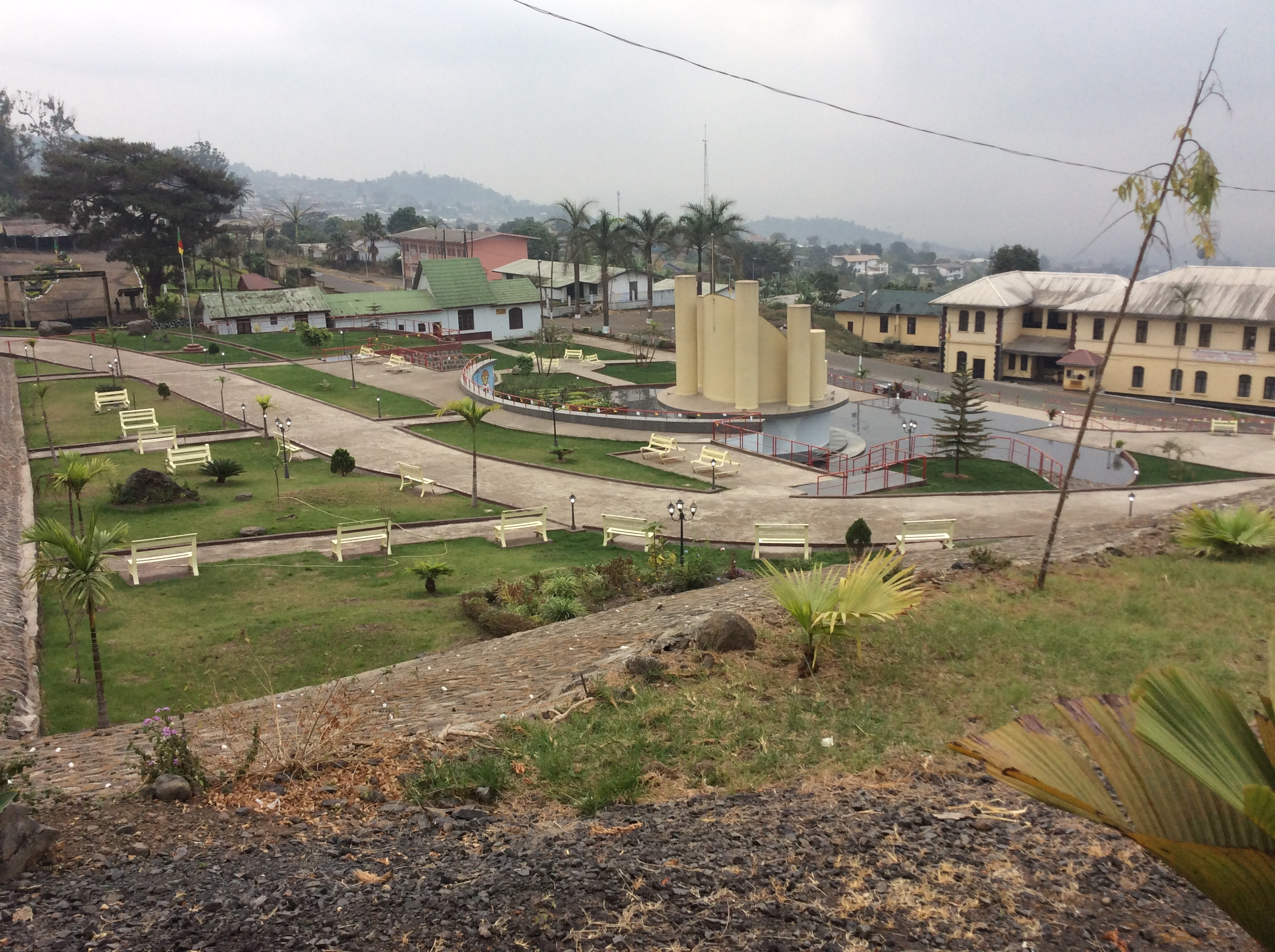
Buea Reunification Monument

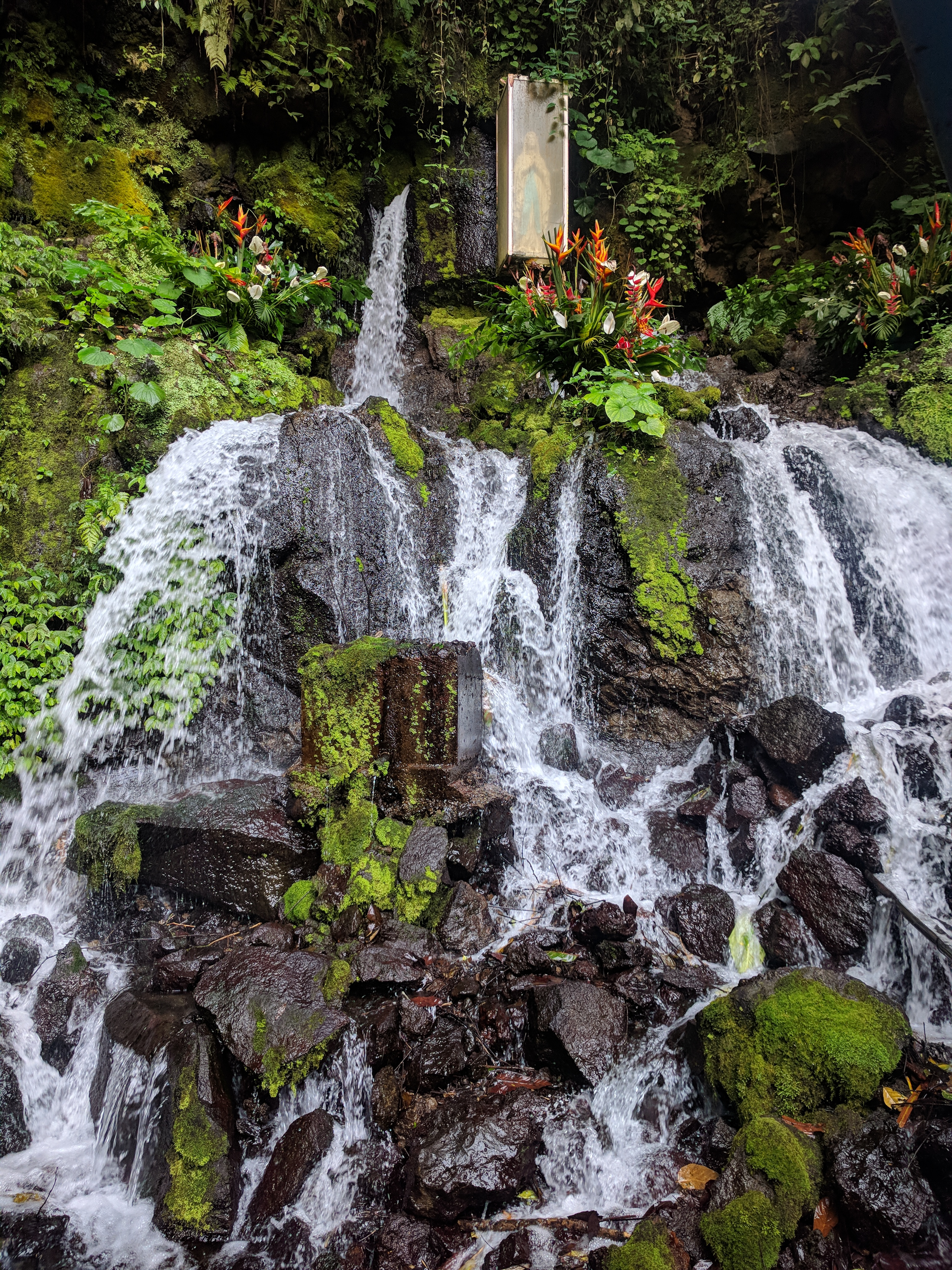
Our Lady of Grace Gretto, Sasse-Buea

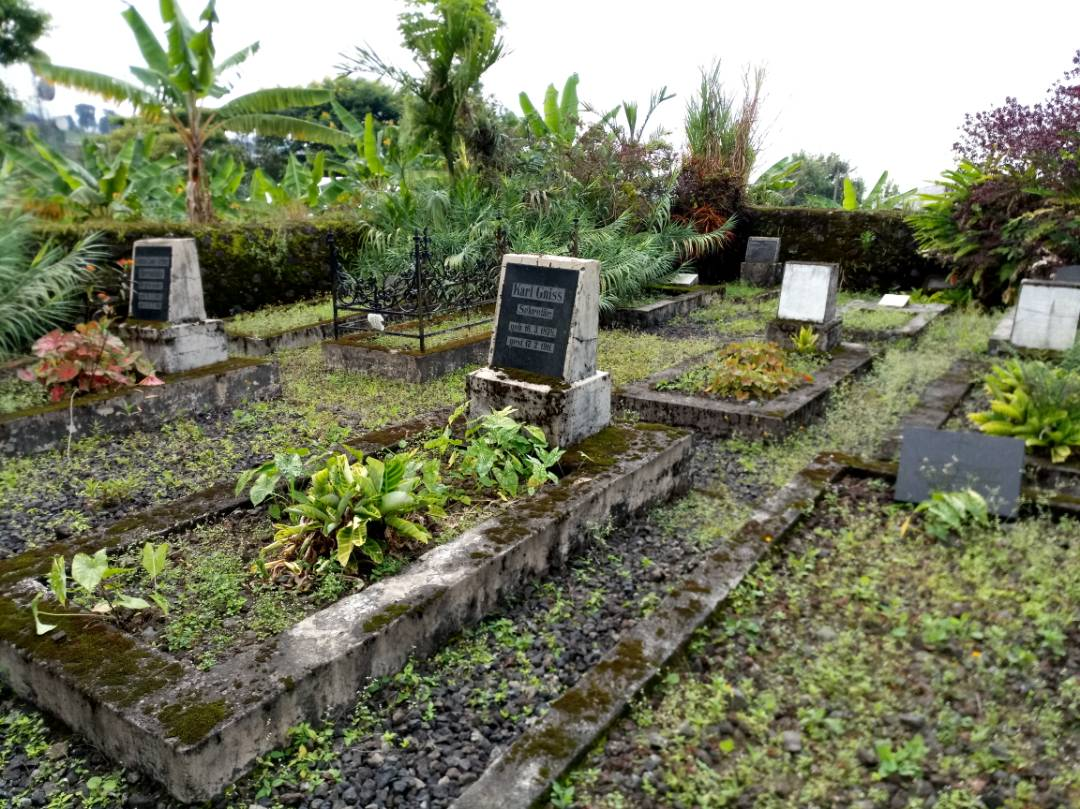
Old German Tombs in Buea

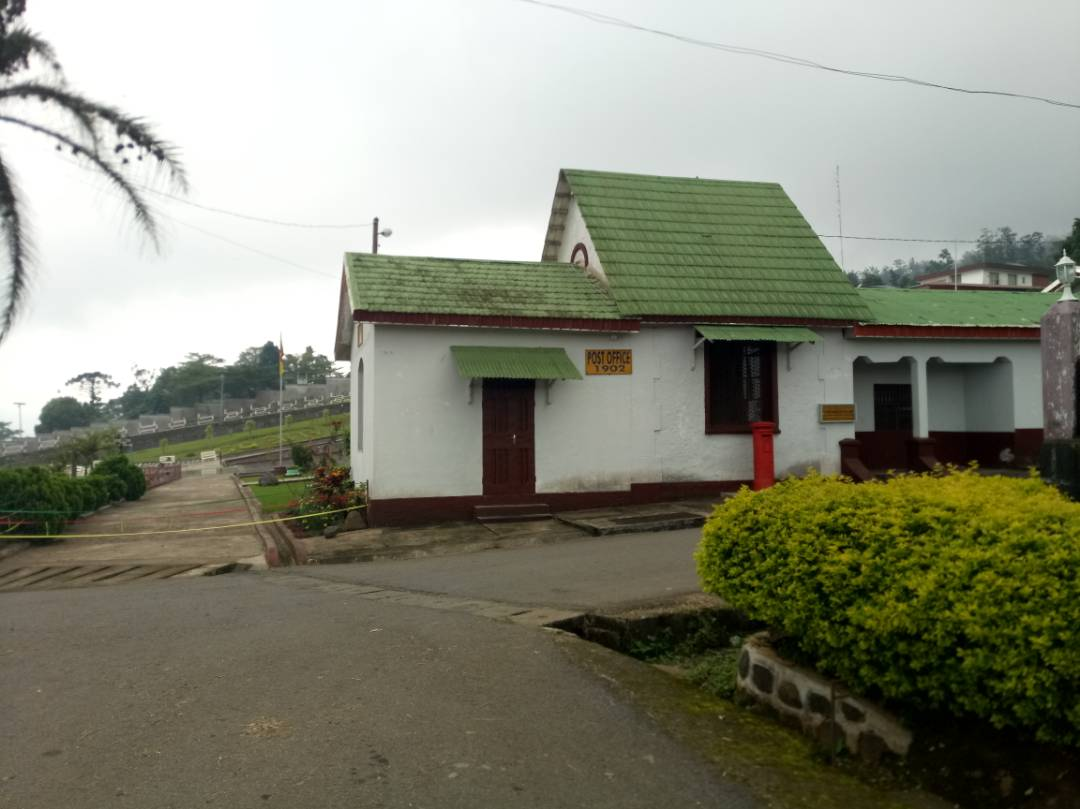
Old German Post Office

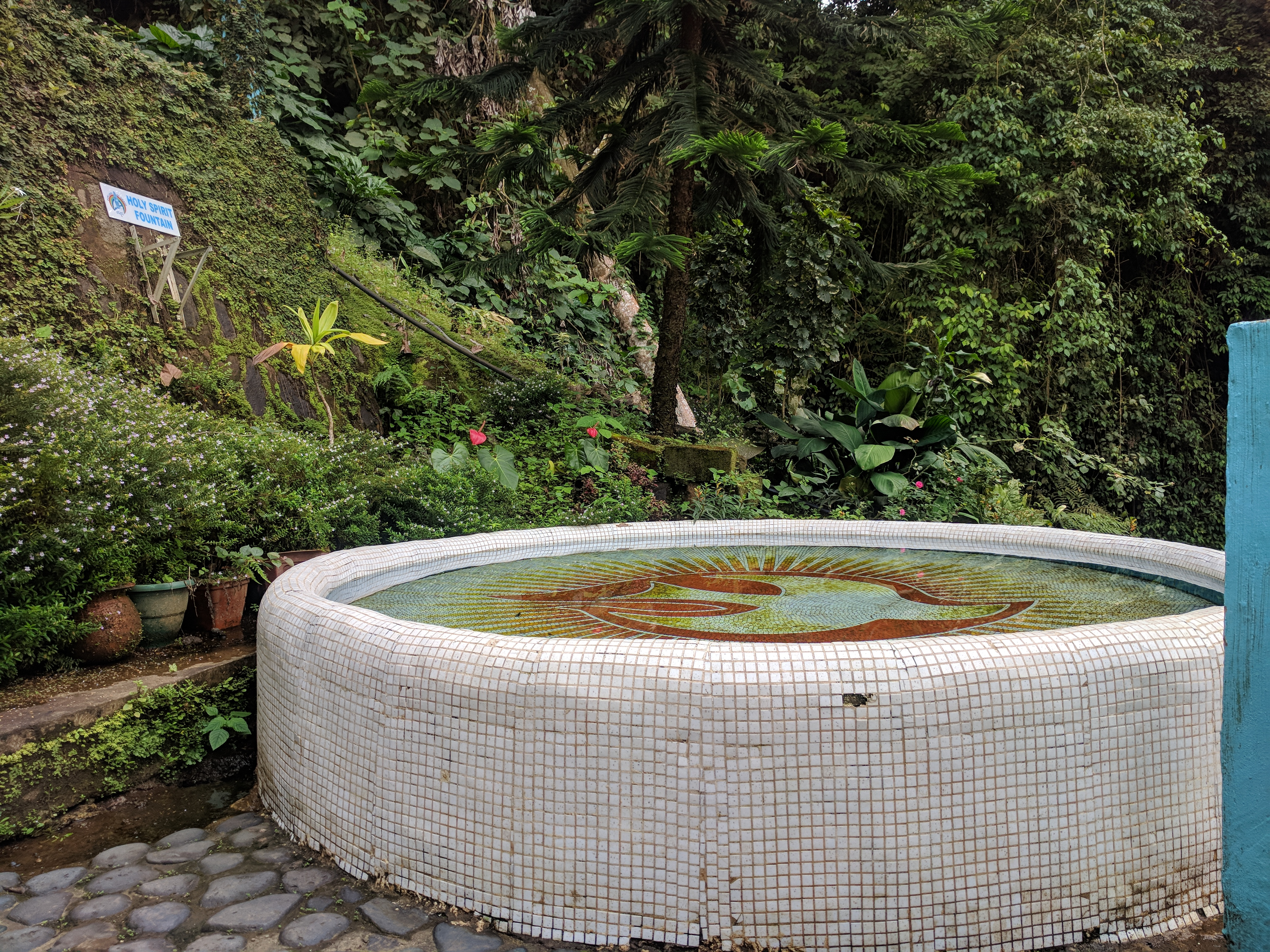
Holy Spirit Fountain, Sasse-Buea

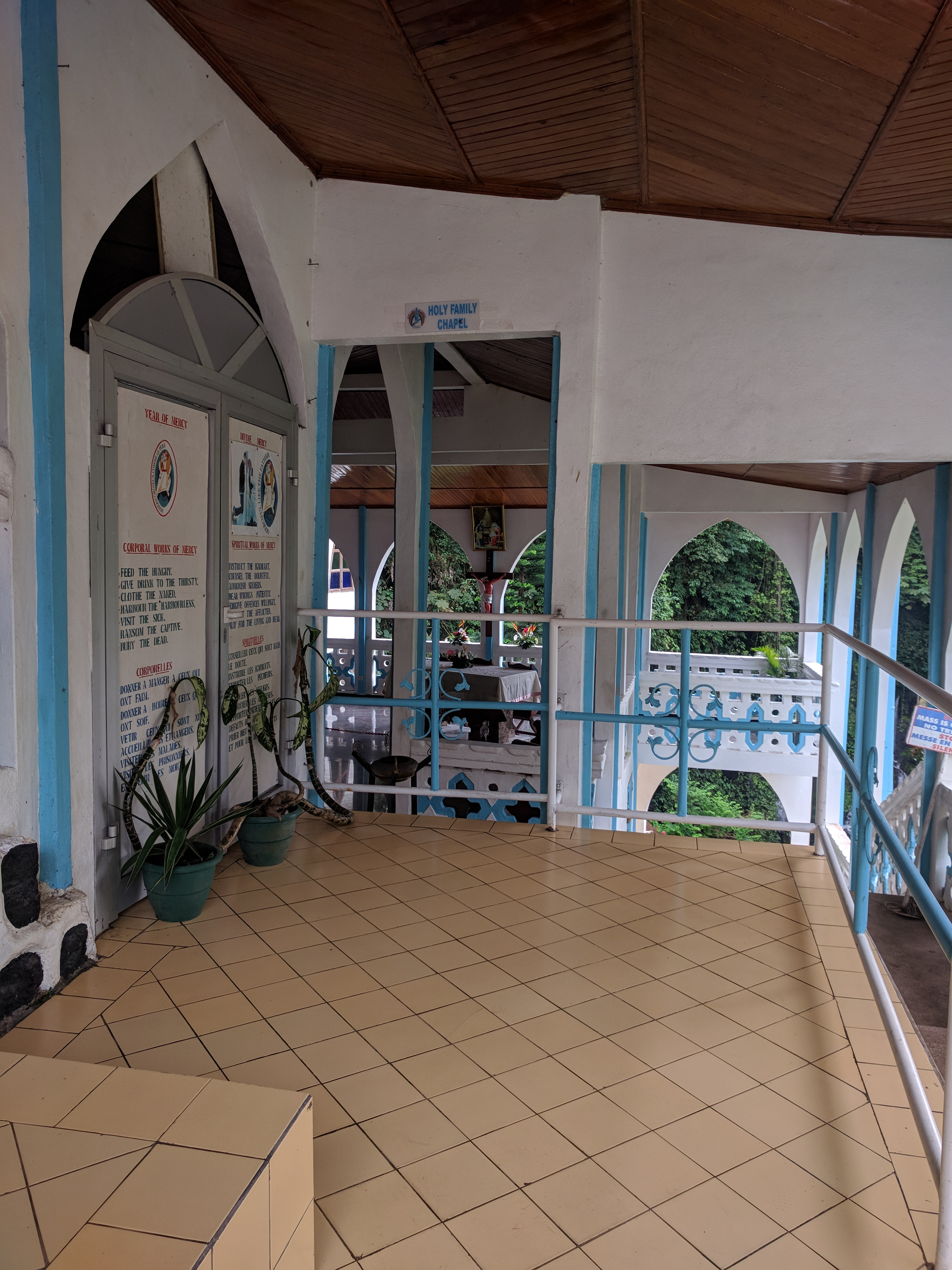
Holy Family Chapel, Sasse-Buea

== Notable people ==
- Victor Anomah Ngu (born 1926, died 2011), Professor of Surgery, Minister of Public Health
- Martin Zachary Njeuma (born 1940, died 2010), historian
- Kurt Raaflaub (born 1941, died 2023), historian
- Dorothy L. Njeuma (born 1943), professor of Genetics and Embryology, politician
- Marie Etengeneng Kwamu-Nana Abunaw (born 1953, died 2024), first female Administrator General of Prisons in Cameroon
- Sarah Etonge (born 1967), fell runner
- Julius Akosah (born 1982), professional footballer
- Daphne (born 1989), singer
- Onyama Laura (born 1992), actress
- Clinton N'Jie (born 1993), professional footballer
- Nsang Dilong (born 1994), actress, model and social worker
- Robert Ndip Tambe (born 1994), professional footballer
- Nelvie Tiafack (born 1999), professional boxer
- Ewome Eko John, chief of Bwasa village.

== See also ==
- Roman Catholic Diocese of Buéa
