= Fako (department) =

- Division
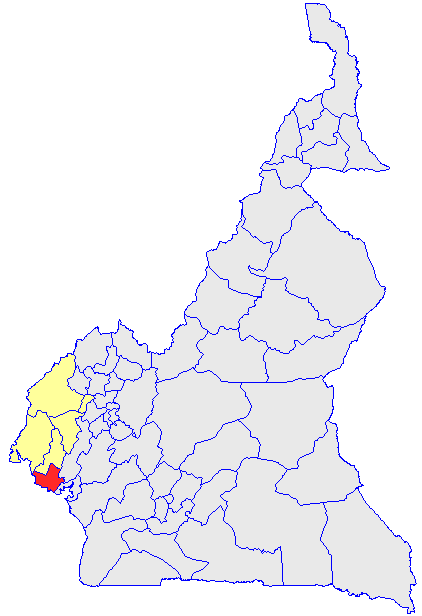
- Department location in Cameroon

- Location within Cameroon Location within Africa
- Country: Cameroon
- Region: Southwest Region
- Capital: Limbé

Area
  - Total: 2,093 km^{2} (808 sq mi)

Population (2005)
  - Total: 466,412
  - Density: 222.8/km^{2} (577.2/sq mi)
- Time zone: UTC+1 (WAT)

Fako is a division in the Southwest Region of Cameroon. The division covers an area of 2,093 km^{2} and as of 2005 had a total population of 466,412. The capital of the department lies at Limbe.

== Subdivisions ==
The division is divided administratively into 6 communes and in turn into sub-districts and villages. The Ambas Bay district is further divided into 3 sub-districts; Limbe I (Victoria), Limbe II (Botaland), Limbe III (Isubuland).

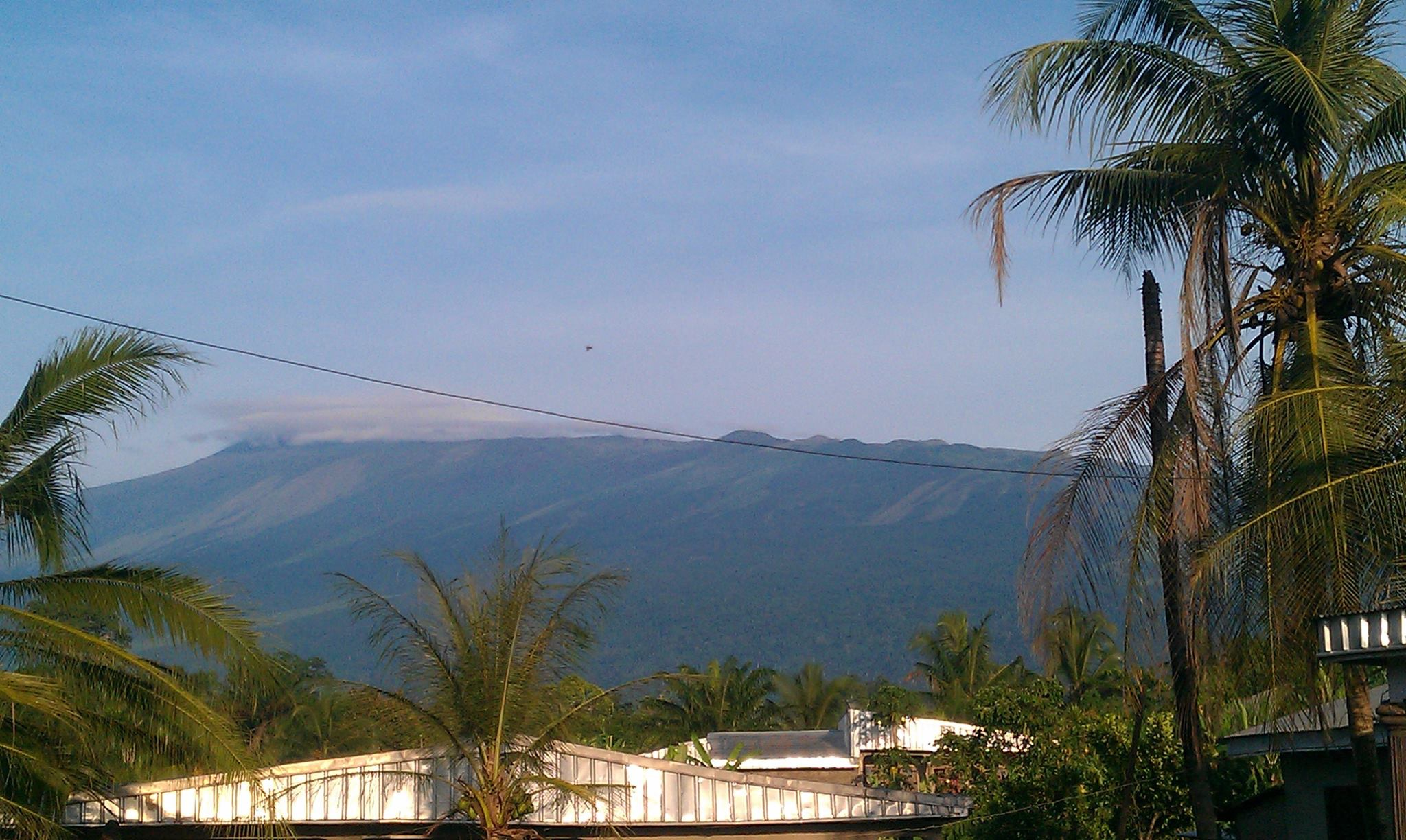
Mount fako (mount Cameroon)

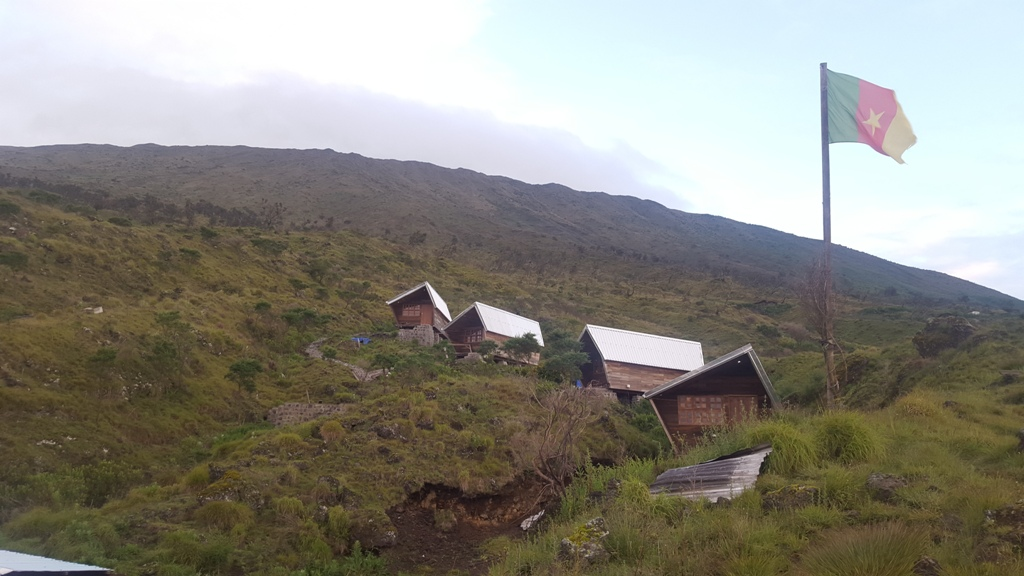
Fako Mountain lodge Hut 2

=== Communes ===
- Dibombari

District	Capital	Area (km^{2})
Buea	Buea Town	534.2
Ambas Bay	Victoria	250.76
Muyuka	Muyuka	476.6
Tiko	Tiko Town	468.7
West Coast	Idenau	305.4

== See also ==
- Communes of Cameroon
