= List of Cameroonians =

List of famous or notable Cameroonians:

== Presidents ==
- Ahmadou Babatoura Ahidjo
- Paul Biya

== Prime ministers ==
- Simon Achidi Achu
- Sadou Hayatou
- Ephraim Inoni
- Bello Bouba Maïgari
- Peter Mafany Musonge
- Philémon Yang

== International diplomats ==
- Nzo Ekangaki
- William Eteki

== Businesspeople ==
- Bony Dashaco (born 1976), media businessman
- Roland Fomundam (born 1981), agricultural entrepreneur
- Mireille Nemale (born 1949), fashion stylist

== Architect ==
- Danièle Diwouta-Kotto
- Lazare Eloundou Assomo
- Hermann Kamte

== Kings ==
- Rudolf Duala Manga Bell, King of Duala
- Ibrahim Njoya, Sultan of Bamoun
- Seidou Njimoluh Njoya, Sultan of the Bamum people

== Other politicians ==
- Marie Catherine Abena
- Haman Adama
- Charles Assalé
- Jean-Baptiste Beleoken
- Zakiatou Djamo
- Emmanuel Endeley
- Henry Ndifor Abi Enonchong
- John Ngu Foncha
- Lucy Gwanmesia
- Rolande Ngo Issi
- Laurentine Mbede
- André-Marie Mbida
- Clémentine Ananga Messina
- Dsamou Micheline
- Salomon Tandeng Muna
- Anne Marthe Mvoto
- John Fru Ndi
- Agnes Ntube Ndode
- Henri Hogbe Nlend
- Sarah Nwanak
- Nicole Okala Bilaï
- Zacharie Perevet
- Madeleine Tchuente
- Njoya Tikum

== UPC nationalists ==
- Osende Afana
- Félix Moumié
- Marthe Ekemeyong Moumié
- Ruben Um Nyobé
- Ernest Ouandié

== Film ==
- Achille Brice
- Sahndra Fon Dufe
- Agbor Gilbert Ebot
- Eriq Ebouaney
- Adela Elad
- Syndy Emade
- Epule Jeffrey
- Enah Johnscot
- Onyama Laura
- Gladys Ndonyi
- Nkanya Nkwai
- Yolande Welimoum

== Musicians ==
- Andy Allo
- Richard Bona
- Manu Dibango
- Henri Dikongue
- Charlotte Dipanda
- Stanley Enow
- Ko-c
- Ndedi Eyango
- Gasha
- Jovi
- Mr. Leo
- Locko
- Montess
- Michael Kiessou
- Magasco
- Coco Mbassi
- Ibrahim Njoya
- Kristo Numpuby
- Anne Marie Nzie
- Petit Pays
- Reniss
- Yung Swiss
- Sam Fan Thomas
- Barthélémy Toguo
- Zangalewa
- BeBe Zahara Benet

== Clergy ==
- Cardinal Christian Tumi
- Archbishop Paul Mbiybe Verdzekov

== Sports ==
=== Soccer ===
- Vincent Aboubakar
- Joseph Akongo
- Benoît Assou-Ekotto
- Sébastien Bassong
- Steve Bessong
- Samuel Eto'o
- Roger Milla
- Alex Song
- Rigobert Song

=== American football ===
- Roman Oben
- Ndamukong Suh

=== Basketball ===
- Alfred Aboya
- Lazare Adingono
- Joel Embiid (born 1994)
- Kenny Kadji (born 1988)
- Paris Lee (born 1995)
- Yves Mekongo Mbala
- Charles Minlend
- Luc Mbah a Moute
- Pascal Siakam (born 1994)

== Scientists and engineers ==
- Pelkins Ajanoh
- Veye Tatah, computer scientist and activist
- Victor Anomah Ngu

== Judges and lawyers ==
- Annie Noëlle Bahounoui Batende
- Ben Duala Ekoko

== Mixed Martial Arts ==
Francis Ngannou, UFC heavyweight champion

== Others ==
- Martin Dibobe, train driver who mysteriously disappeared in 1922
- Chantal Gondang, dancer and choreographer

== See also ==
- Demographics of Cameroon
