= Montess =

Cameroonian singer, songwriter and dancer

- Born: Montess Ivette Enjema; 20 July 1991 (age 35); Buea, Cameroon
- Occupations: Singer; songwriter; sound engineer; actress
- Musical career
- Genres: Afropop; Afrobeats
- Instrument: Vocals
- Years active: 2009–present
- Label: Queens Legacy

Montess Ivette Enjema (born July 20, 1991), better known by her stage name Montess, is a Cameroonian singer, dancer and songwriter.She gained prominence in 2015 after releasing "Love Witta Gun Man", a song that got her an Afrima award for Best Female artiste in Central Africa in 2017.

== Early life and career ==
Montess began her career at the age of 6 as a ballerina at the Government Primary School in Buea Town. She later developed into dancing where she was awarded best dancer in the Buea community during the inter-school 11 February competitions.

She later moved to acting and ended up being a singer. She began her musical career as lead singer of the University of Buea Orchestra

== Discography ==
=== Selected singles ===
- "DJ Play Ma Song" (featuring Stanley Enow) (2016)
- "Love Witta Gun Man" (2016)
- "Prends Mon Coeur" (2018)
- "Bring It 2nite" (2018)
- "Passe Partout" (featuring Mr Leo) (2019)
- "Allez Allez" (featuring Ko-c) (2019)
- "Small Girl Big God" (2021)

== Awards and nominations ==
All Africa Music Awards AFRIMA
Year	Work	Award	Result
2017	Love Witta Gun Man	Best Female Artiste Central Africa	Won

Muzikol Music Awards
Year	Work	Award	Result
2020	Passe Partout ft Mr Leo	Best Collaboration	Nominated
