= Ekoko =

Ekoko is a surname. Notable people with the surname include:

- Ben Duala Ekoko (1949–2009), Cameroonian Attorney General of the Southwest Region of Cameroon
- Jirès Kembo Ekoko (born 1988), French Congolese footballer
