= Small Soppo =

- Interactive map of Small Soppo

The village of Small Soppo is located in Buea district in the Fako Division of Cameroon. It is part of Great Soppo, which is made up of Sovereign Soppo Mokongo, Soppo Wôganga, Soppo Wôvila, Soppo Wôteke and Soppo Likôkô. This village has 2227 inhabitants. Among them, 1305 are men and 922 are women.

View of Mount Cameroon from Small Soppo

== Location ==
Small-Soppo is next to District Hospital Buea and is located between Great Soppo and the Tole tea estate. It links the rural upper parts of Bojongo exiting from Limbe to the rest of Buea through Longstreet and New Road Bakweri Town into Great Soppo and its environs.

== Geography ==
Similar to that of Tole and Bakweri Town, Small Soppo shares its subtropical highland climate with Buea. Humidity is high because of its location at the foot of Mount Cameroon. Neighborhoods at higher elevations enjoy cooler temperatures. Bakweri Town's high elevation cools temperatures and increases rainfalls. it is characterized by high fog, drizzles, and heavy rainfall in the rainy season.

== Notable sites ==
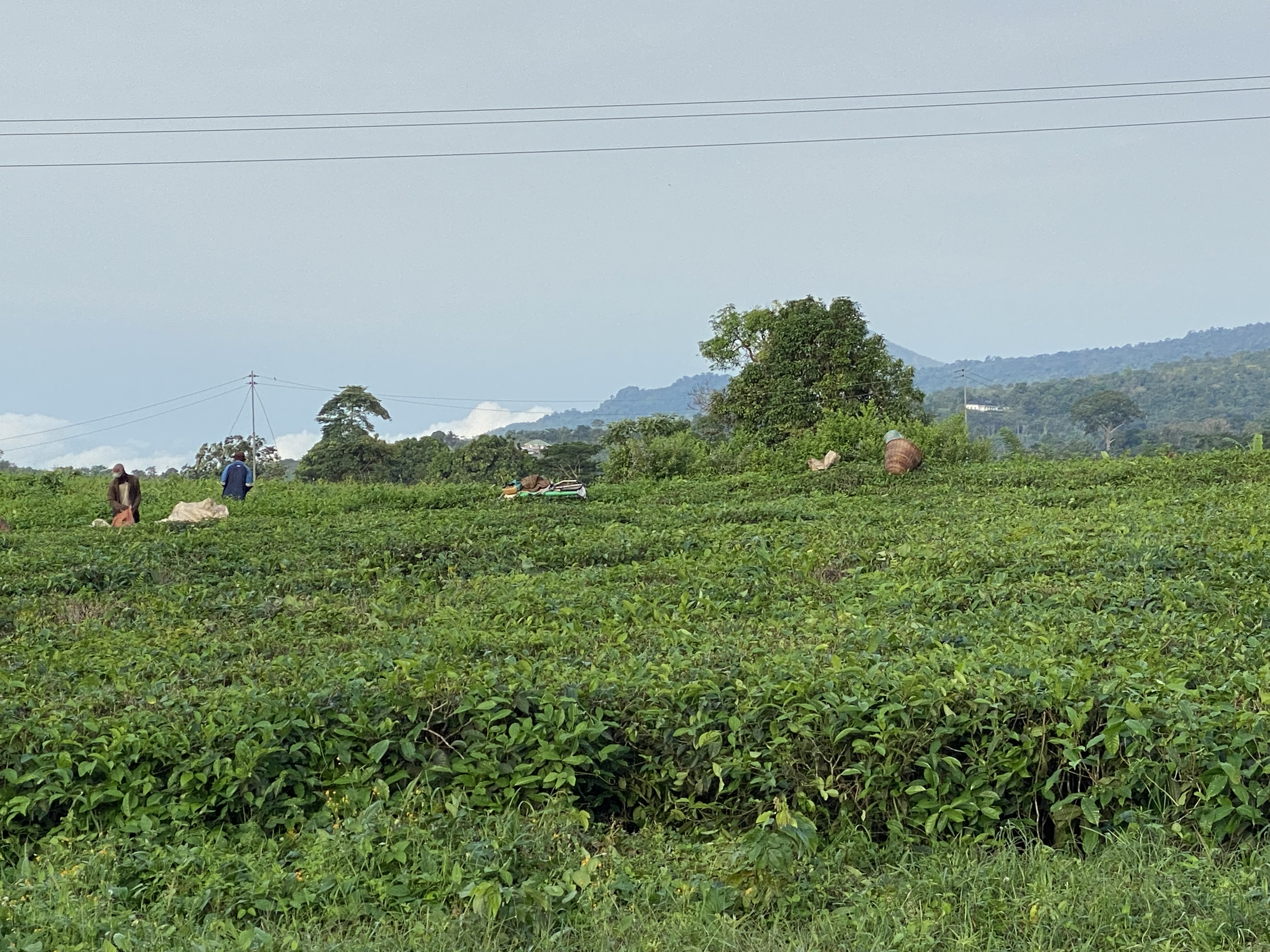
Tole Tea (Small Soppo) farmers harvesting

- Bishop Rogan
- Tole Tea Estate
- SASSE
