= Democratic Union of Cameroonian Women =

Democratic Union of Cameroonian Women Union Démocratique des Femmes Camerounaises
- Abbreviation: UDEFEC
- Founders: Emma Ngom, Marthe Moumié, and Marie-Irène Ngapeth Biyong
- Founded: 3 August 1952
- Dissolved: 1957
- National affiliation: Union of the Peoples of Cameroon

Party flag
- Flag of the Union of the Peoples of Cameroon

The Democratic Union of Cameroonian Women (French: Union Démocratique des Femmes Camerounaises - UDEFEC) was a branch of the Cameroonian nationalist party advocating for Cameroonian independence, Union des Populations du Cameroun (UPC). UDEFEC operated from 1949-1957, facing a ban by the French Colonial Government from 1955, where its activities persisted discreetly until 1957.

UDEFEC played a significant role in advocating for Cameroonian independence. It engaged in various forms of activism, including educational programs, petition campaigns, and efforts to mobilize women across different social groups. These activities aimed to address social and political issues within French colonial rule. Despite the ban by the French Colonial Government, the organization continued to function, adapting its strategies to maintain its activities. UDEFEC's efforts contributed to the broader movement for Cameroonian independence and had a lasting impact on subsequent discussions regarding women's rights and social issues in Cameroon.

== History of the UDEFEC ==
The UPC consisted of an expansive network of affiliated organizations. In addition to the UDEFEC, it also included the youth group “Jeunesse Démocratique du Cameroun” (JDC) and the labor movement “Union des Syndicats Confédérés du Cameroun” (USCC). The UDEFEC, itself had a hierarchical structure of independent local committees spread across different regions in Cameroon which regularly communicated with each other, and collaborated on organizational efforts. The structure allowed the UDEFEC to be both a social and political movement, as it mobilized female resistance and education across the country. Marianne Nsoga, the secretary of the Babimbi branch of UDEFEC, described the organization's primary goal as “giving women a voice, sending petitions to the UN, and protesting colonial abuses.”

The UDEFEC coexisted alongside the “Union of Cameroonian Women” (UFC), a key women's nationalist political organization in Cameroon. While the UFC sought to maintain ties with France, advocating for the integration of French Cameroon within the French Union, the UDEFEC pushed for complete independence and the reunification of British and French Cameroon. Furthermore, the UDEFEC's tactics reflected their more hardline stance, adopting more radical and militant policy. The UDEFEC championed anti-colonial resistance against French Cameroon through various techniques, including mobilization and petitioning. Its work rested within the broader context of other women-led anti-colonial movements in the region such as in British Southern Cameroon and was instrumental in inspiring later anti-colonial and feminist movements in Cameroon.

== Forming the UDEFEC ==
The UDEFEC was founded on August 3, 1952 by Emma Ngom, Marthe Moumié, and Marie-Irène Ngapeth Biyong, three Cameroonian women who grew up in the colonial educational system. Emma Ngom was inspired to create the UDEFEC after returning from the Vienna Conference on Childhood held by the International Democratic Federation of Women, a conference that reported on the poor health conditions facing children and pregnant women globally, issues that were later incorporated into the demands of the UDEFEC's petitioning campaign.

Although its founders were educated, notably by the UPC-founded Ecole des Cadres that aimed to train nationalist women as future civil servants and administrators and taught courses such as “Colonial Administration” to inform women on the difference between a sovereign, national government and an oppressive colonial regime, UDEFEC membership was primarily drawn from rural and working-class women, many of whom had little to no formal education. The education of women, particularly those from rural communities, was critical to UDEFEC's activities: increasing literacy rates amongst women was essential to UDEFEC's petitioning and messaging strategies.

=== Key figures ===
Many UDEFEC leaders were initially in the UFC, where they advocated for women's rights but within a French colonial framework. Over time, they became disillusioned with the UFC's pro-French stance, leading them to form the UDEFEC, which advocated for women's rights alongside full Cameroonian independence.

==== Emma Ngom ====
A co-founder of UDEFEC who was inspired to create the organization after attending the Conference on Childhood in Vienna. She believed that UDEFEC could play a key role in the broader nationalist movement advocating for Cameroonian independence. She recognized that within the patriarchal society in Cameroon, UDEFEC would need some help achieving its goals, so she enlisted the help of her brother, Jacques Ngom, who used his influence as a key advisor to the UPC to provide strategic & operational support.

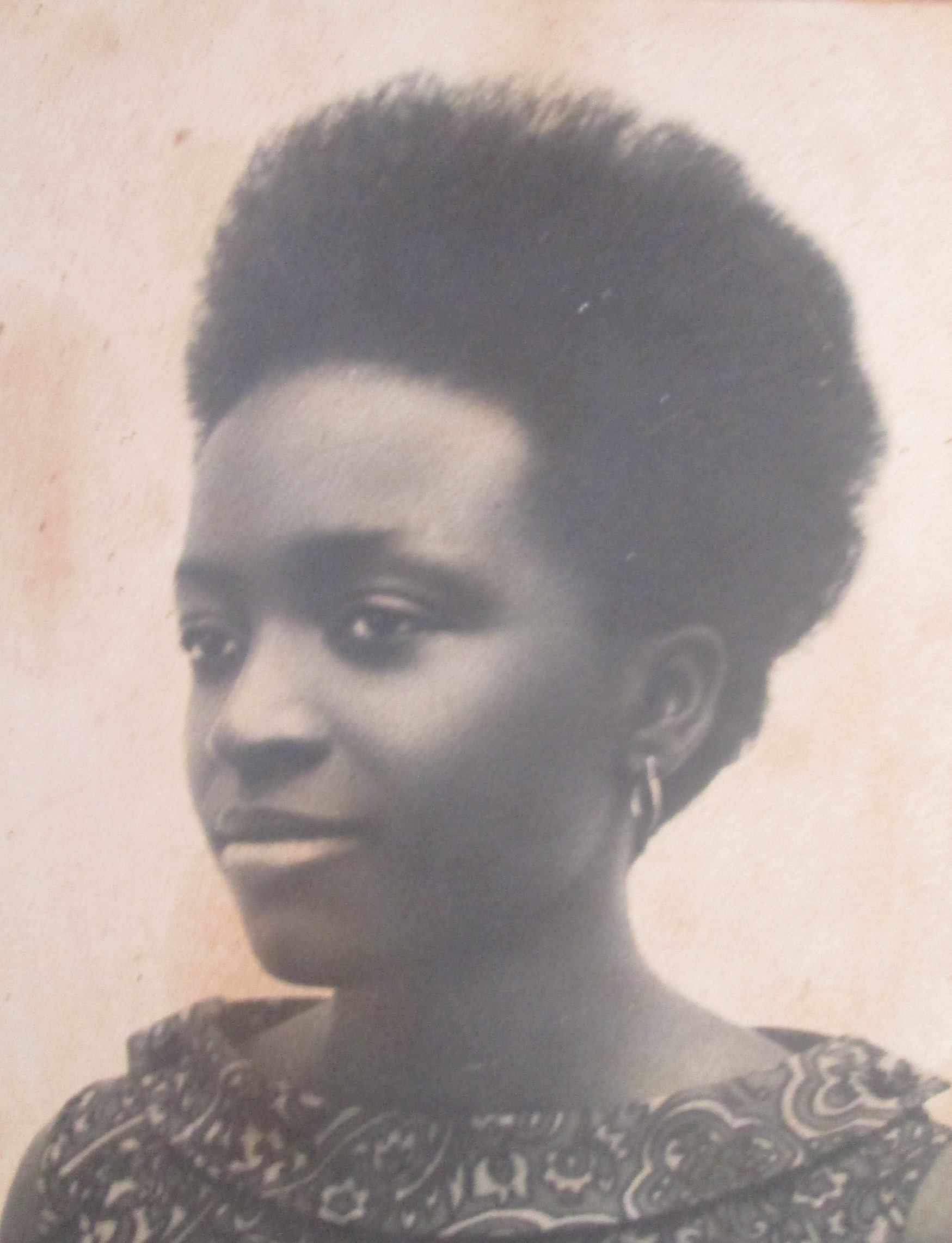
Marthe Ekemeyong Moumié: Political Activist and Strategist in Cameroon's Anti-Colonial Movement

==== Marthe Moumié ====
A member of both the UPC and a co-founder of UDEFEC, Mounie and her husband, who was also a member of UPC, suffered distresses from UPC activists from 1955 until its illegal dissolution by the French government. Her husband, Felix-Roland Moumié served as the leader of the struggle for Cameroon's independence, and was officially proclaimed a national hero by the law. Moumié was arrested and deported from Cameroon to Egypt in 1957, then went into exile in 1959, moving between various countries in Africa. In 1969, Moumié was arrested again in Eq. Guinea, and extradited to Cameroon, where she would spend 3 years in prison until her release in 1972.

===== Marie-Irène Ngapeth Biyong =====
(General Secretary of UFC, later UDEFEC's leader) – the first secretary general of the UDEFEC. Became one of the most active UDEFEC figures. She supported nationalist demands and mobilized women across ethnic, class, and educational differences, in both urban and rural areas. As General Secretary, Biyong advocated for the organization's autonomy within the broader nationalist movement, which caused tensions with UPC leaders that resulted in disciplinary proceedings against her for treating UDEFEC as a separate entity and publishing the journal "Femmes Kamerunaises" without prior UFC party approval. Biyong went into exile upon the outlawing of UDEFEC in 1955, seeking refuge first in British Cameroon and later Nigeria. She would return to French Cameroon shortly before the nation achieved full independence in 1960.

===== Julienne Niat =====
Julienne Niat was the former president of the UFC and later a UDEFEC leader. Initially advocated for more moderate reforms under the UFC but joined the UDEFEC when she began embracing more nationalist objectives. Before UDEFEC, she was a prominent political activist in Cameroon, serving as president of Assofecam, the first national women's movement in Cameroon, and even ran twice for a position in the Cameroonian Territorial Assembly.

==== Marthe Ouandié ====
Marthe Ouandié served as the treasurer of UFC and later became a prominent leader within UDEFEC. Initially involved with both organizations, she eventually dedicated herself fully to UDEFEC's nationalist movement. In 1957, Ouandié was forced into exile, first moving to Sudan and later Ghana, and she was unable to safely return to Cameroon until 2000.

Earlier, in 1954, Ouandié joined other UDEFEC leaders in Douala to appeal to the United Nations for the release of Pierre Penda, a UPC activist associated with Solidarité Babimbi, a group focused on regional economic development. Additionally, Ouandié sent a telegram from Kumba alerting the UN that the French government had deployed thousands of paratroopers to the Sanaga-Maritime area, accusing these forces of violently targeting and killing pregnant women and infants.

==== Marianne Nsoga ====
Emphasized the importance of local committees, highlighting their critical role in supporting the movement. During meetings with women organized by UDEFEC, she shared how UN representatives had once questioned Um Nyobé about the participation of women in Cameroon. Additionally, Nsoga advised committee members to avoid interactions with colonizers and their supporters, both European officials and businessmen, as well as the Cameroonian collaborators who worked closely with them.

== Mobilization and activism ==
The UDEFEC conducted grassroots activism, mobilizing women from all segments of society, rural and urban, to demand better access to education, healthcare, social rights, and labor rights, including fair wages and better working conditions. For instance, UDEFEC played a critical role in mobilizing market women, whose involvement was central to urban protests against economic exploitation by French merchants. They strived for their objectives by encouraging women to challenge colonial authorities through petition writing, protests and demonstrations, such as boycotts and strikes.

=== Education ===
The organization emphasized political literacy as a form of resistance, training women to read, write, and articulate their political grievances. The UDEFEC held massive meetings where petitions were recited aloud to educate women about colonial injustices. These meetings also served as a forum for women to listen to and share testimonies of their experiences under colonial rule. Furthermore, these meetings enabled literate women to help record the testimonies of illiterate rural women, thus granting them the opportunity for their voices to be heard and included in political activities. To further ensure more women's voices were heard, the UDEFEC organized literacy programs for women, particularly in rural areas to spread political and legal knowledge amongst them. The UDEFEC also heavily criticized the colonial education system, which focused on training women in domestic skills such as sewing, cooking, and childcare, rather than academic or professional subjects, including basic literacy. Instead, the UDEFEC called for women to have access to the same level of education as Cameroonian men and for women to be allowed to hold leadership positions in educational institutions.

=== Petitioning strategy ===
In particular, the UDEFEC relied heavily on mass petitions as a political strategy to challenge French colonial rule. This petitioning campaign was launched at the UDEFEC's first congress in 1954, where members specifically demanded the expansion of prenatal care, birthing clinics, child labor laws, and educational institutions for Cameroonian children. These petitions outlined French human rights abuses of Cameroonian women and were either presented to French authorities or to the UN Trusteeship Council. By petitioning the UN directly, the UDEFEC bypassed the repressive French colonial administration and appealed directly to the international community for support. One such petition, which depicted the murder of Irène Taffo, a pregnant woman, and her husband in Bamenda by French forces, was used as direct evidence of colonial brutality.

== French repression & underground resistance ==
The UDEFEC's efforts were met with almost immediate repression from the French Colonial government. The French government viewed UDEFEC as a radical nationalist organization, and a threat to its colonial control over Cameroon. This led to heavy surveillance, police harassment, and arrests of its members. Many UDEFEC leaders were exiled, imprisoned, or forced into hiding due to their political activities. The organization, along with its affiliates (UPC & JDC), were outlawed on July 13, 1955.

After the French government banned the UDEFEC and its affiliates, they were forced to move their operations underground. However, UDEFEC leaders, notably Marie-Irene Ngapeth Biyong, quickly adapted, using their homes as secret meeting spaces and facilitating covert communications between exiled nationalist leaders and resistance fighters through UDEFEC's vast network. They were able to do so partly because French Colonial authorities often underestimated their ability to act because they were women, which allowed the organization to avoid higher levels of scrutiny. Many UDEFEC leaders fled to Ghana, where they received support from Kwame Njrumah's Pan-Africanist government. These exiled UDEFEC activists worked closely with other African independence movements, especially ones in Guinea, Algeria and Ghana. Even in exile and under French colonial repression, the leaders of the UDEFEC continued sending petitions to international bodies like the UN and the Organization of African Unity (OAU) to call attention to France's violent and oppressive rule in Cameroon.

The UDEFEC also faced opposition from Cameroonian women. Since some Cameroonian women sought to uphold the status quo, they collaborated with the French administration to suppress the UNDEFE. With the support of the colonial government, the Evolution Sociale Camerounaise (ESOCAM) was formed to generate social policies that restricted women to a domestic sphere which hindered UDEFEC initiatives.

== Legacy of the UDEFEC ==
=== Anti-colonial legacy of Cameroon ===
The UDEFEC played a foundational role in the UPC's anti-colonial movement, and was instrumental in pressuring the international community to support women's rights initiatives in Cameroon. Due to its involvement, and the ensuing repression from the French Colonial government, the UDEFEC's ability to mobilize and conduct activities to promote women's rights and Cameroonian independence was severely limited. However despite this, UDEFEC's efforts in the early 1950s paved the way for other like-minded organizations to continue the anti-colonial movement in Cameroon. Furthermore, the relocation of a large number of nationalist activists as a result of the forced exile of UDEFEC members by the French Colonial government minimized ethnic divides and strengthened anti-colonial solidarity throughout the nation. The petitioning strategies, which had been a hallmark of UDEFEC's activity, were also adopted by women's rights groups that were founded post-independence.

=== Black feminist activism ===
Despite contemporary activists not using the term “feminist”, UDEFEC's work and advocacy aligned strongly with black feminist decolonial theory, and the way it seeks to challenge power structures (both colonial and post-colonial) that exclude women from full citizenship and political participation. The intersectional nature of UDEFEC's activism, recognizing the connections between race, gender and class, has served as a historical example of the real-world potential for black feminist decolonial theory to affect change in political spheres. Marianne Nsoga, another key UDEFEC leader, instructed members to remain disciplined, avoid interaction with colonial authorities, and focus on consolidating their networks. Other activists, such as Marguerite Batum, emphasized caution, vigilance and secrecy to prevent colonial authorities from infiltrating UDEFEC and undermining its work. UDEFEC's focus on improving the political consciousness of women, increasing their political participation and advocating for their civil rights and access to healthcare ultimately left a legacy of grassroots activism that inspired many others to follow in its footsteps.

=== Dissolution ===
UDEFEC's activities effectively concluded in 1957, shortly following Cameroon's independence. This dissolution was the culmination of several factors: the achievement of independence, which fulfilled the organization's primary objective; the severe disruption caused by the French colonial government's 1955 ban, which forced UDEFEC into five years of clandestine operation; and the exile of key leaders, which significantly hampered their ability to function effectively. With independence, the national focus shifted to nation-building, leading to the natural conclusion of UDEFEC's specific mandate. However, the organization's legacy of advocacy for women's rights and liberties continued to influence subsequent movements within the newly formed Cameroonian state.

== Bibliography ==
- Actu Cameroun. "Fin de parcours: L’inhumation de Marthe Oundié boycottée." Actu Cameroun, May 16, 2016. Accessed March 14, 2025. https://actucameroun.com/2016/05/16/fin-de-parcours-linhumation-de-marthe-ouandie-boycottee/.
- Cormier, François. “‘Notre Jeanne d’Arc’ Regards Sur La Première Femme Candidate à Des Élections Au Cameroun.” Fragments d’Afrique, November 17, 2021. https://fradafriques.hypotheses.org/23.
- Farmer, Ashley D. “‘Abolition of Every Possibility of Oppression’: Black Women, Black Power, and the Black Women's United Front, 1970–1976.” Journal of Women's History, vol. 32, no. 3, 2020, pp. 89–114. ProQuest, doi:10.1353/jowh.2020.0028. https://www.proquest.com/scholarly-journals/abolition-every-possibility-oppression-black/docview/2447581785/se-2.
- François Cormier, "“Notre Jeanne d'Arc” Regards sur la première femme candidate à des élections au Cameroun," Fragments d'Afrique, November 17, 2021, https://fradafriques.hypotheses.org/23.
- Germain, Félix, and Silyane Larcher. "Social Imaginaries in Tension?" Black French Women and the Struggle for Equality, 1848–2016, edited by Félix Germain, Silyane Larcher, and T. Denean Sharpley-Whiting, University of Nebraska Press, 2018, pp. 175–186. ProQuest Ebook Central.https://ebookcentral.proquest.com/lib/ubc/detail.action?docID=5498044.
- Kah, Henry K. "Women's Resistance in Cameroon's Western Grassfields: The Power of Symbols, Organization, and Leadership, 1957–1961." African Studies Quarterly, vol. 12, no. 3, 2011, pp. 67–91. ProQuest. https://www.proquest.com/scholarly-journals/womens-resistance-cameroons-western-grassfields/docview/897469651/se-2.
- Konde, Emmanuel. Review of Petitioning for Our Rights, Fighting for Our Nation: The History of the Democratic Union of Cameroonian Women, 1949–1960, by Meredith Terretta. Le Mouvement Social, no. 255, 30 June 2016, pp. 161–163, doi:10.3917/lms.255.0161c.
- Le Mouvement Social 2016/2 (N° 255), Page 71.” Le Mouvement Social, 2016. Accessed 13 Mar. 2025.https://shs.cairn.info/revue-le-mouvement-social1-2016-2-page-71?lang=fr.
- Ndengue, Rose, and S. C. Kaplan. “Deprovincializing the Feminine/Feminist Cameroonian Nationalism of the 1950s: The UDEFEC and Pluriversal Black Feminism.” Journal of Women's History, vol. 35, no. 3, Sept. 2023, pp. 62–80, doi:10.1353/jowh.2023.a905190.
- Noumowe, Léonel Noubou. “Les Tirailleurs du Cameroun face à la politisation de l’espace colonial et à l’émergence du Mouvement Nationaliste (UPC), 1944–1960.” Cahiers d’études africaines, vol. 255–256, 2024, pp. 607–633, doi:10.4000/12qno.
- O’Rourke, Harmony. "Women in Cameroon." Oxford Research Encyclopedia of African History, Oxford University Press, 19 Nov. 2020. Accessed 3 Mar. 2025. https://oxfordre.com/africanhistory/view/10.1093/acrefore/9780190277734.001.0001/acrefore-9780190277734-e-574.
- Perotti, N. "International Conference for the Defence of Children, Vienna (April 12–16, 1952)." Indian Journal of Pediatrics, vol. 19, 1952, pp. 122–134, doi:10.1007/BF02957709.
- Terretta, Meredith. Petitioning for Our Rights, Fighting for Our Nation: The History of the Democratic Union of Cameroonian Women, 1949–1960. Langaa Research & Publishing, 2013.
- Terretta, Meredith. “Cameroonian Nationalists Go Global: From Forest Maquis to a Pan-African Accra.” The Journal of African History, vol. 51, no. 2, 2010, pp. 189–212, doi:10.1017/S0021853710000253.
- Terretta, Meredith. “A Miscarriage of Revolution: Cameroonian Women and Nationalism.” Stichproben – Vienna Journal of African Studies, vol. 7, Dec. 2007, pp. 61–90.https://stichproben.univie.ac.at/fileadmin/user_upload/p_stichproben/Artikel/Nummer12/Nr12_Terretta.pdf.
- The Three Marthes: Symbol of the UPC's Womanist Ideologies.” PoiseSocial, Accessed 13 Mar. 2025. https://poisesocial.com/the-three-marthes-symbol-of-the-upcs-womanist-idealogies/.
