= Tole Tea Estate =

Town in the Southwest Region of Cameroon

Coordinates: 4°07′18″N 9°14′42″E

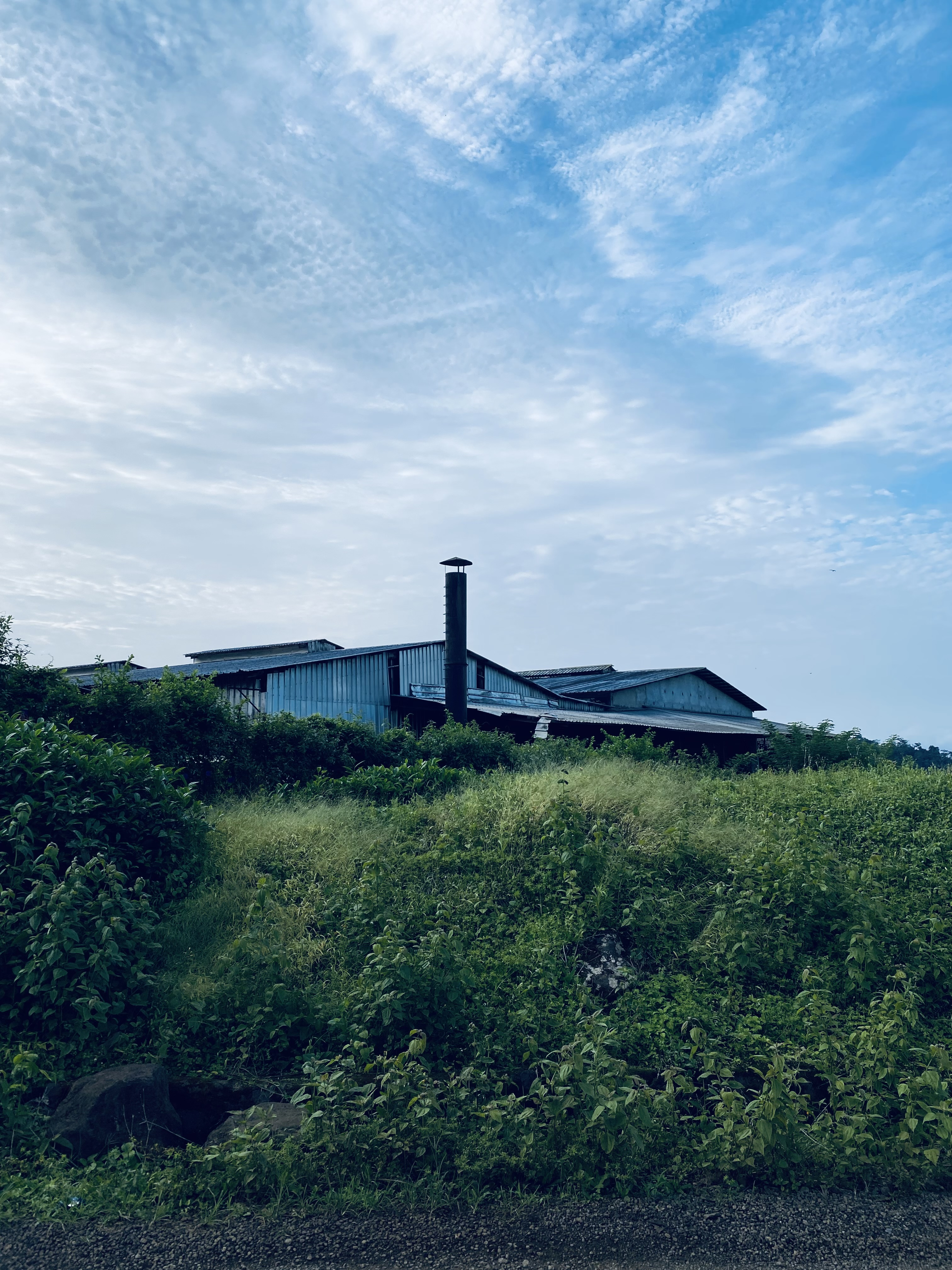
Tole Tea Factory

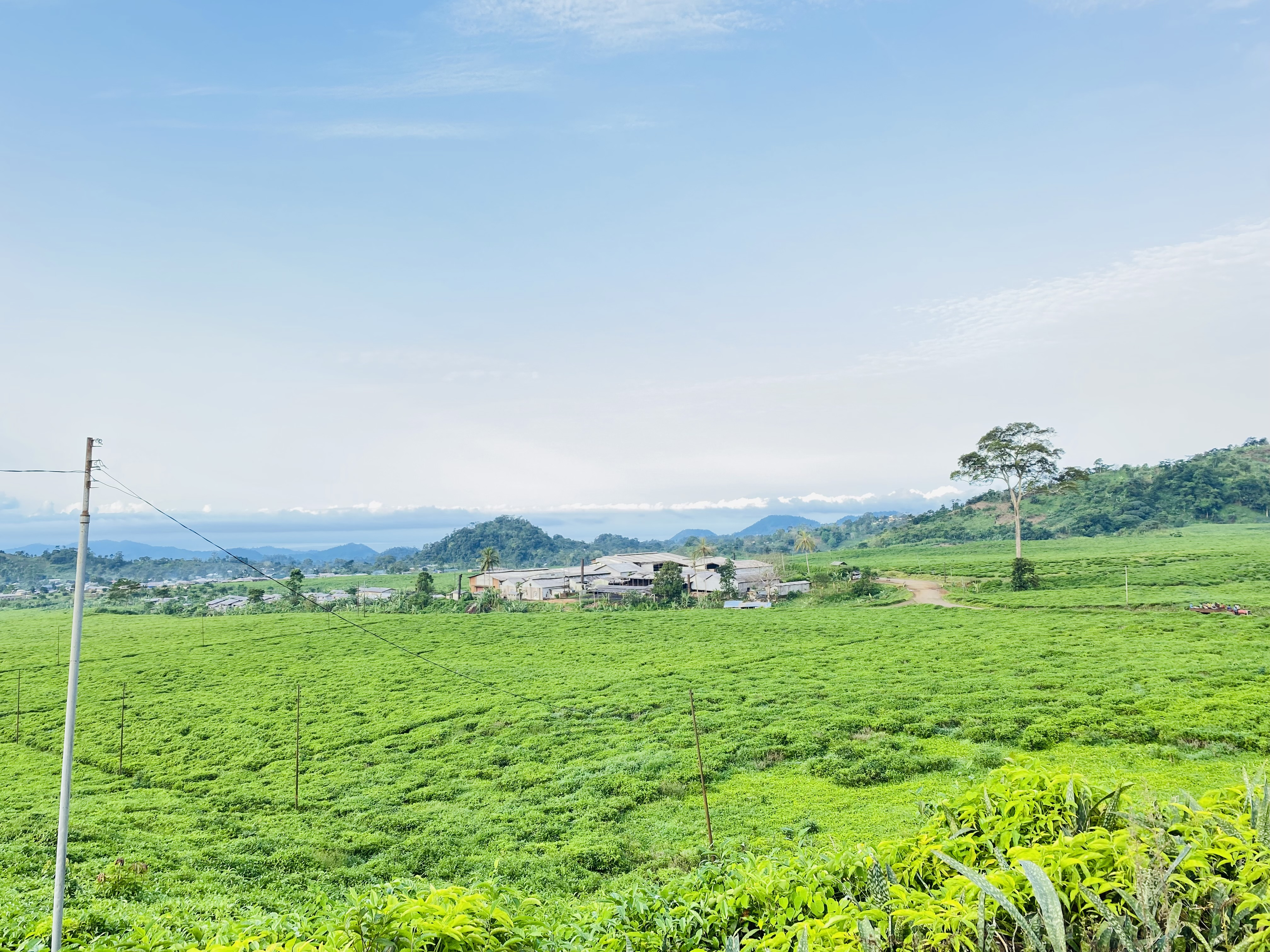
Tole Tea Estate settlement

Tole Tea Estate is a community in Cameroon, located in the foothills of Mount Cameroon, just a few kilometers from Buea Town.

== History ==
The Tole Tea Estate, located in the Southwest Region of Cameroon was established in 1928 by the British. Under British administration, the estate was managed by the Commonwealth Development Corporation before being transferred to the Cameroon Development Corporation (CDC) in 1947. In 2002, the estate was privatized, leading to significant changes in its management and operations.

== Geography ==
Buea has a subtropical highland climate, with high humidity because of its location at the foot of Mount Cameroon. Neighborhoods at higher elevations experience cooler temperatures, while neighborhoods at lower elevations experience hotter temperatures. Bonduma has a more moderate elevation, generating average temperatures between these two extremes. Extended periods of rainfall are common during the rainy season and can last for several weeks. During the dry season, Bonduma has undergone increasingly common water shortages.

== Culture ==
The local language in Bonduma is Mòkpè (also Mokpwe), the language of the majority Bakweri population in Buea. French and English are official languages in Buea, but the town is primarily anglophone. Many of the inhabitants of Buea use Cameroonian Pidgin English.

== Location ==
The Tole Tea Estate is located some five kilometers from Buea Town. Tole is situated in Buea in Fako Sub-Division, Southwest Region of Cameroon. It is bound by Small Soppo in the North, Sasse in the South, Bokwoango in the Western flank and a waste land which extends to Bolifamba is on the East.

== Education ==
Bishop Rogan

SASSE

== Nearby sites (towns/villages/places) ==
- Small Soppo
- Bokwoango
- Bolifamba
