= Nicole Okala Bilaï =

Cameroonian politician

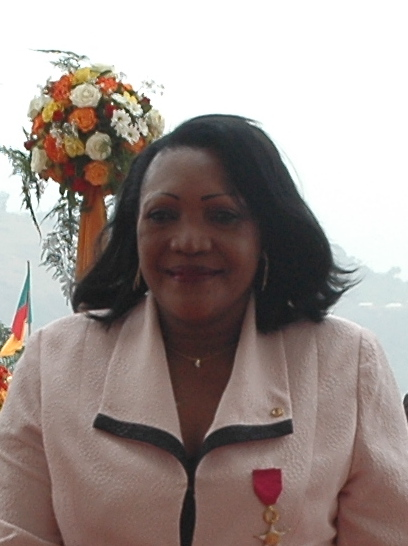
- Born: 26 May 1949 (age 76); Cameroon
- Citizenship: Cameroon
- Occupations: Politician,Model,Actor,Restaurateur,Businessperson

Nicole Okala Bilaï, born on May 26, 1949, in Dang in the centre region of Cameroon, is a Cameroonian politician.

After having worked as a model, actress, restaurant owner, and businesswoman, she became an activist of the Cameroon People's Democratic Movement (CPDM) in the Centre Region, mayor, Senator in 2013. She is married and is a mother of four.

Her father Charles Okala was a parliamentarian in Cameroon between 1947 and 1955.

== Education and early career ==
She holds a "Bafa de Ludothécaire", allowing her to operate a leisure center for children. She also has a degree from the Institute of Western Languages obtained in 1996, and a diploma from IFOCOP in Paris in 2004. From 1976 to 1994, she held the position of director of companies and then commercial consultant in Paris. She acted in Urbain Noukouma's « La brûlure » and « Notre fille ne se mariera pas» by Daniel Kamwa with main roles in 1980.

She also worked as a medical delegate for the group of pharmacists in Cameroon. She is also a representative of two major French laboratories. After the meeting her husband in 1977, she redirected herself in the restaurant business domain in Douala.

She is also a founding member of GFAC2.

== Political career ==
In 1985, she joined the Cameroon Peoples Democratic Movement (CPDM). Six years later, she resigned from this party and created the Cameroon Social Union (USC), which merged with the National Union for Democracy and Development (UNDP, majority). She left the UNDP and returned to the CPDM, which gave her the opportunity to be elected in 2007 as mayor of Mbangassina and deputy parliamentarian. Since April 29, 2013, she has been a senator and, following her appointment, she became vice-chair of the Committee for Youth Education and Vocational Training.

== Elective mandates ==
- 1991: 1st female leader of a political party in Cameroon;
- 2007: Deputy parliamentarian]] and mayor of Mbangassina.
- 2013 – To this day: Senator from the Centre Region.
