= Clémentine Ananga Messina =

Cameroonian politician (1959–2022)

Clémentine Antoinette Ananga Messina
- Born: 15 March 1959; Evondo, Ngang, Mefou and Afamba, Cameroon
- Died: 5 August 2022 (aged 63); Anadolu Hospital, Istanbul, Turkey
- Occupations: Politician, agronomist
- Office: Deputy Minister to the Minister of Agriculture and Rural Development
- Political party: RDPC (Democratic Rally of the Cameroonian People)
- Spouse: Pierre Ananga Messina

Clémentine Antoinette Ananga Messina (born Beyene; 1959–2022) was a Cameroonian politician. She held the position of Deputy Minister to the Minister of Agriculture and Rural Development from 30 June 2009 to 5 August 2022.

== Biography ==
Ananga Messina was born on 15 March 1959. She hails from the village of Evondo in Ngang, Mefou and Afamba department, Nkolafamba district. She was a graduate agronomist and also held a postgraduate diploma in economic policy management.

== Career ==
The bulk of her career was spent at the Ministry of Agriculture, where she rose from a junior position to Deputy Minister to the Minister of Agriculture and Rural Development, appointed by the President of the Republic, Paul Biya, on June 30, 2009. Before her ministerial position, she served as head of department, technical advisor, and director of agricultural surveys and statistics in the same ministry. For 13 years, she contributed to the development of the agricultural sector in Cameroon.

On December 3, 2015, Clémentine Ananga Messina met with the Director-General of the FAO, Food and Agriculture Organization of the United Nations, José Graziano da Silva, on the sidelines of the 153rd session of the Organization's Council. This was after the signing of a $20 million partnership agreement to support the development of the national agricultural sector and an agreement on the establishment of an FAO partnership and liaison office in Cameroon.

== Political life ==
An active member of the RDPC, Democratic Rally of the Cameroonian People, and president of the party's communal campaign commission in Nkolafamba, Ananga Messina regularly conducted grassroots campaigns there.

She died on 5 August 2022, at the Anadolu Hospital in Istanbul, Turkey, leaving behind her husband, Pierre Ananga Messina, a native of the Lekié department, Central region.
