= Madeleine Tchuente =

Cameroonian pharmacist and politician (born 1950)

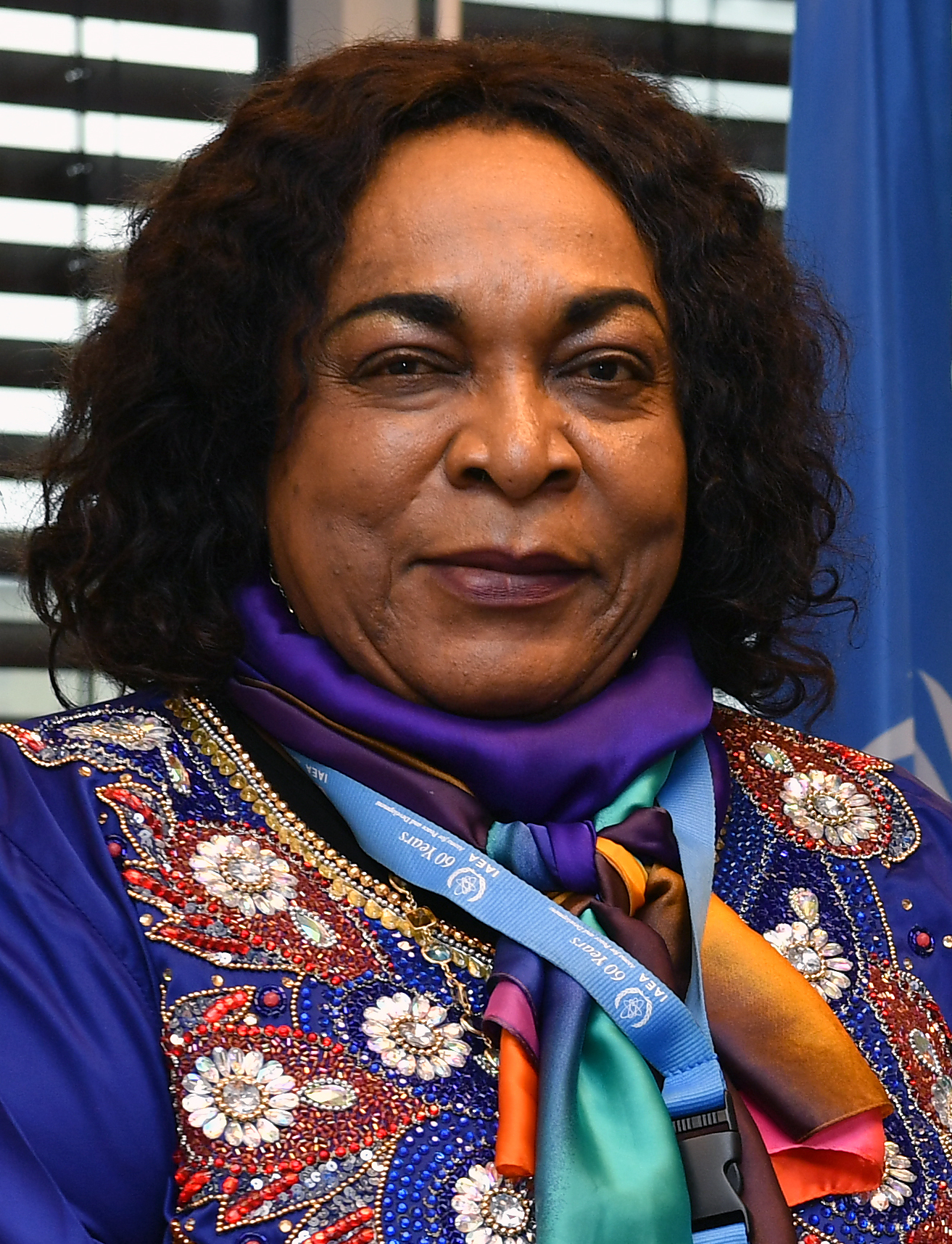
- Tchunite in 2017

Minister of Scientific Research and Innovation
- Incumbent
- Assumed office 8 December 2004
- Prime Minister: Ephraïm Inoni; Philémon Yang; Joseph Ngute
- Preceded by: Zacharie Perevet

Member of the National Assembly for Mifi
- In office 1988–1997

Personal details
- Born: 5 November 1950 (age 75) Koung-ghi, West Region, Cameroon
- Party: CPDM
- Education: University of Strasbourg

Madeleine Tchuente (born 5 November 1950) is a Cameroonian pharmacist and politician who has served as Minister of Scientific Research and Innovation since 2004.

== Biography ==
=== Early life, education, and career ===
Originally from the West Region of Cameroon, specifically the Koung-ghi department in the Bayangam district. She was born on 5 November 1950 , completed her secondary education in Nkongsamba and obtained a scientific baccalaureate. She earned a university degree in pharmacy from the University of Strasbourg.

== Career ==
Professional Tchuente practiced as a pharmacist, specializing in the distribution of medications in Bafoussam.

== Political career ==
Tchuente entered politics with the establishment of the Democratic Rally of the Cameroonian People (RDPC). Over the years, she held various positions within the party, including serving as a member of the OFRDPC national office in 1990, a member of the RDPC central committee in 1997, and a member of the commission of political affairs during the extraordinary congresses of 1996, 2001, and 2006. She also served as general rapporteur during the extraordinary congress of 21 July 2006. Additionally, she is the president of the RDPC section of Mifi. On 8 December 2004 she was appointed Minister of Scientific Research and Innovation, a position she has retained through subsequent ministerial reshuffles. Madeleine Tchuente is currently serving as Cameroon’s Minister of Scientific Research and Innovation (MINRESI) as of 2025.
