= Roland Fomundam =

Cameroonian entrepreneur (born 1981)

- Born: 2 August 1981 (age 45); Douala, Littoral Region (Cameroon)
- Education: Northeastern University (BS, MS)
- Occupation: Agricultural entrepreneur
- Organizations: Youth Action Africa; GreenHouse Ventures; MoonLight Mining and Restoration Company

Roland Fomundam (born 2 August 1981) is a Cameroonian entrepreneur and founder of Greenhouse Ventures Ltd. In 2007 he founded Youth Action Africa, a platform which promotes technology development.

== Early life ==
Fomundam was born in Douala. He is a native of Ku Momo Northwest Region (Cameroon).

== Career ==
Fomundam is the founder and CEO of Greenhouse Ventures Ltd. He started his professional career in 2007. in 2016 and 2017 by Advance Media CELBMD Africa and partners in the category of business. within agricultural businesses.

== Awards and recognition ==
Year	Award	Category	Result	Ref.
2016	Most Influential Cameroonian by Advanced Media	Business	Nominated	
2017	Most Influential Cameroonian by Advanced Media	Business	Won	

== See also ==
- List of Cameroonians
- Media of Cameroon
