= Mr. Leo =

Cameroonian singer (born 1990)

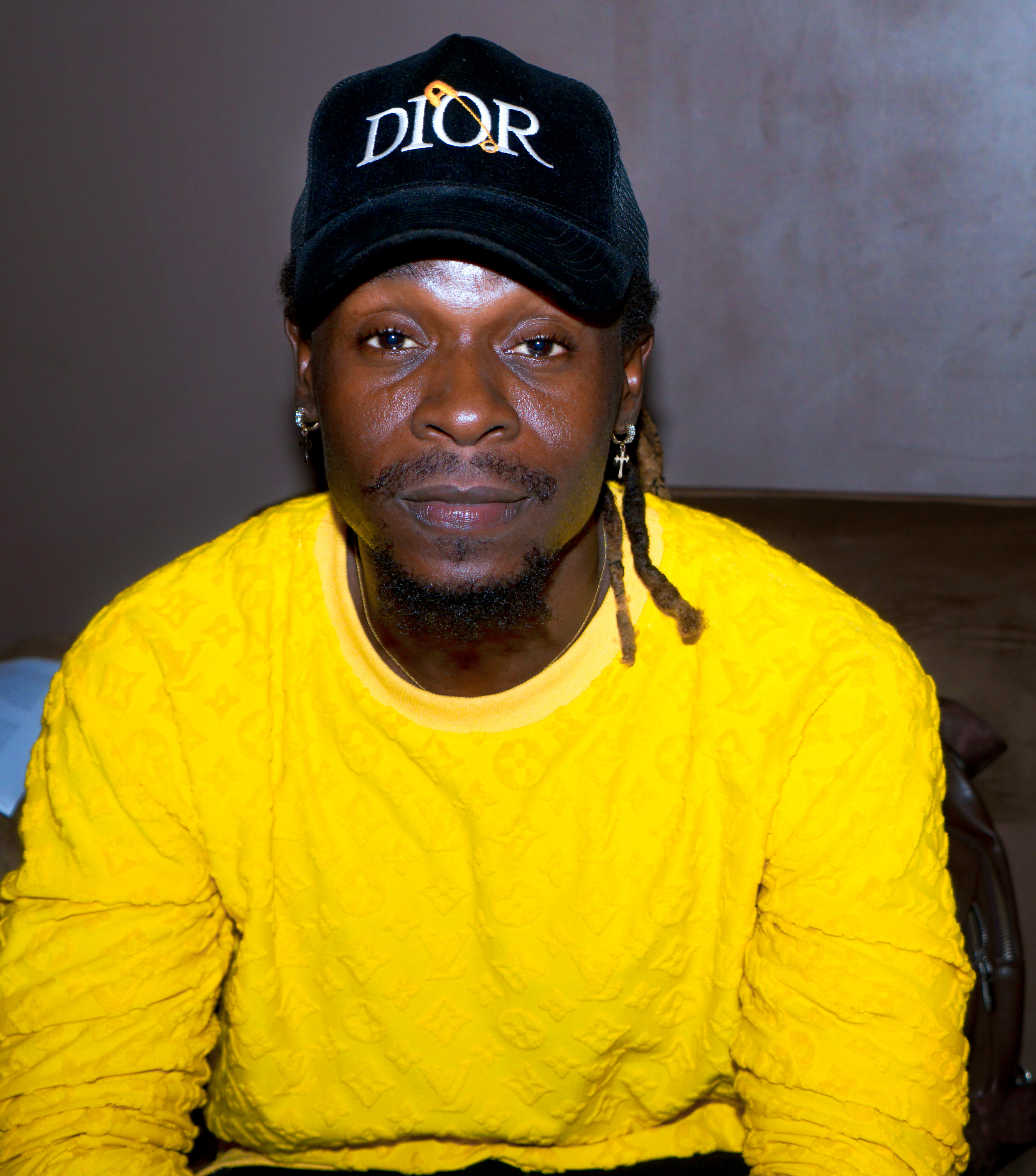
- Mr Leo in 2021

Background information
- Also known as: Mr Leo
- Born: Fonyuy Leonard Nsohburinka; August 31, 1990 (age 36); Buea, Cameroon
- Genres: Afropop; hip hop; dancehall
- Occupation: Singer
- Works: Love Original - 2017 Jeey (Lion of Africa) - 2021 Good Vibes - 2024
- Years active: 2014–present
- Label: Lionz Muzik
- Website: www.mrleomusic.com

Fonyuy Leonard Nsohburinka (born August 31, 1990) is a Cameroonian singer known by his stage name Mr. Leo. He rose to fame after his single "E go beta" a hit aired on most Radio/TV stations in and out of Cameroon. In 2016, he received three awards at the Balafon Music Awards 2016 edition in Song of the Year, Revelation of the Year, and Best Male Artist. He was nominated for the All Africa Music Awards (AFRIMA) in Lagos, Nigeria 2017 edition in the category of Best Male Central Africa. As part of his career, in March 2017 he became the brand ambassador of Itel Mobile in Cameroon.

== Early life and education ==
Mr. Leo was born Fonyuy Leonard Nsohburinka on August 21, 1990, and grew up in a military camp (Warder Barracks) in Buea, Southwest Region (Cameroon). He is a member of the Nso people who grew up in a military ghetto. He is the 3rd child in a family of 4.

== Career ==
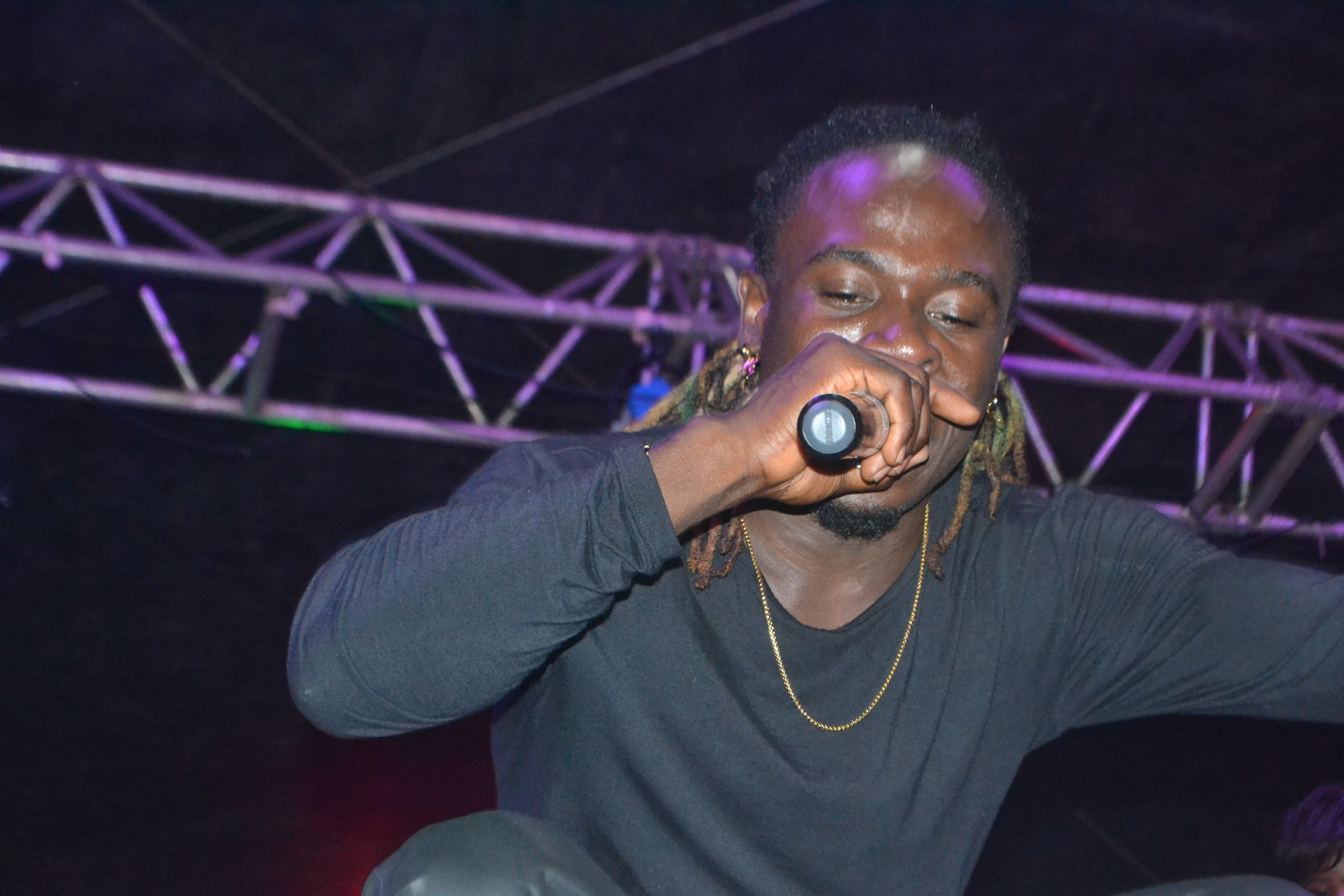
Mr. Leo performing at the Douala Hip Hop Festival in 2017

In 2016, African news aggregates AllAfrica.com published that, Mr. Leo's passion for music started when he became a member of a school Choir Break Through Voices. Leo finally left the camp and moved to Molyko (the heart of studies and entertainment) in South west region of Cameroon. There is time for everything, Leo's professional career started when he signed a recording deal with Alpha Better Records in 2015, in the same year, Alpha Better Records released his debut single hit song titled (E go Beta) and in November 2015 his label released another of Mr.Leo single title "On Va Gérer" which means (we shall manage). Mr. Leo's career has earned the Cameroonian artist 5 awards in the following categories which include; best lyricist, best new artist, best video and best song with a message, and best Cameroonian soul music. Leo was inspired by Seal, Lemar, 2face Idibia, and others. Mr. Leo has been recognized by awards and nominations such as the African Entertainment Awards (USA), and he was nominated for Best Francophone artist and Best Male Single in Jamais-Jamais 2017.
In 2017, he signed an endorsement deal with Itel Mobile as brand ambassador in Cameroon and he said {Big Deal being signed with itel Mobile, I'm blessed!.} Like any other artist, he has done collaboration with artists such as Wax dey, X-Maleya, Locko, Magasco, Hiro, Fanicko and others.

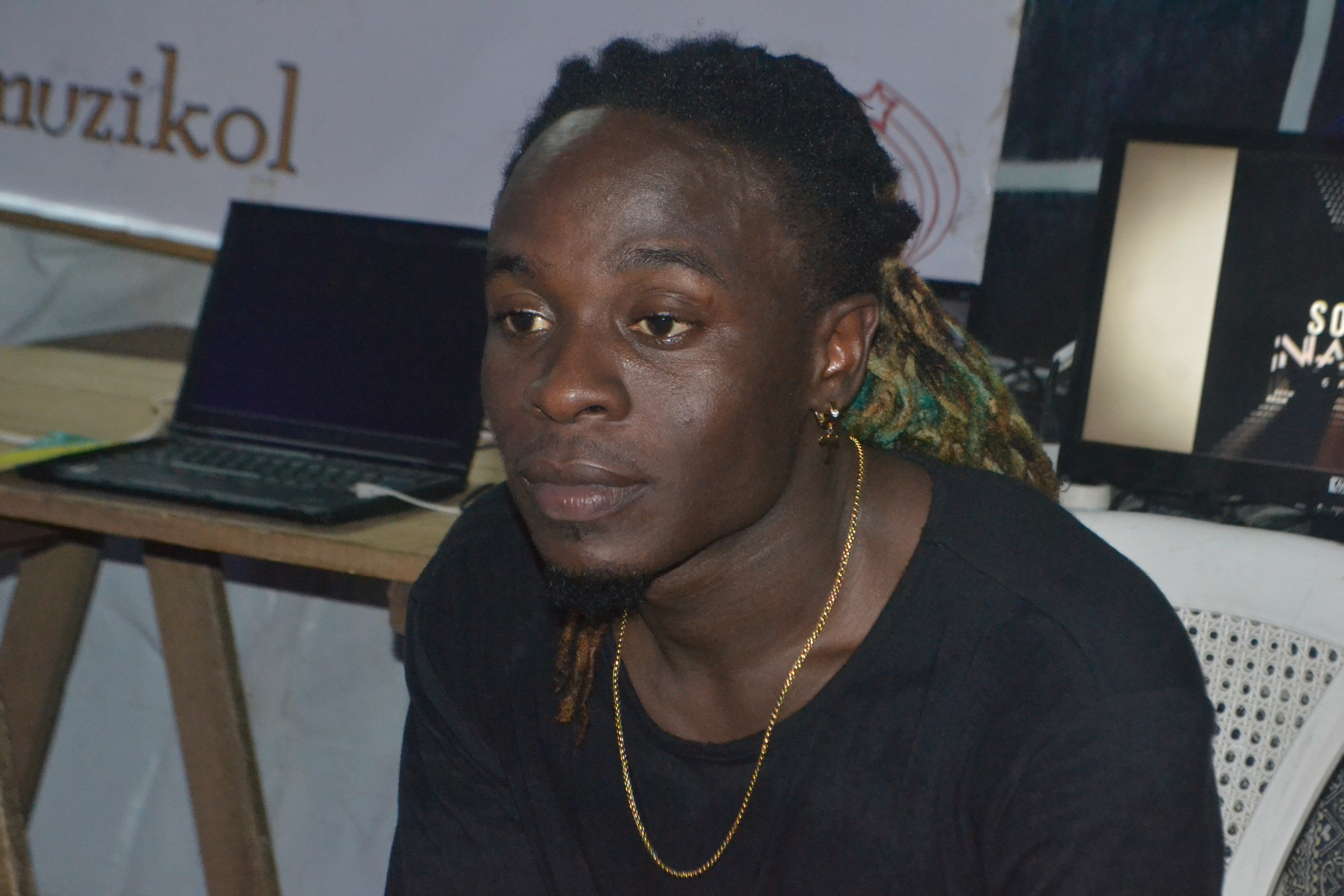
Mr Leo in 2017

In 2019, he founded the record label Lionn Productions (now Lionz Muzik) through which he produces Cameroonian artists Kameni, Gomez, Askia, Princess Vinia, Kotto Boy & Mr Sympa. He left Alpha Beta records Label in July 2020, after 13 years.

In 2021, he was selected to part to be part of the Grammy Awards Recording Academy.

== Personal life ==
Mr. Leo is still single.

== Discography ==
=== Albums ===
- Love Original 2017 (13 Tracks)
- Lion of Africa (Jeey) 2021 (13 tracks)
- Good Vibes 2024 (14 tracks)
- Kisheri (EP) - 2024 (6 Tracks)
- L'élue de mon cœur (EP) 2024 (6 Tracks)
- Cœur de Lion I (LP) 2025 (15 Tracks)
- Cœur de Lion II (LP) 2025 (15 Tracks)

=== Selected as single ===
- O'Leo (Colleta) (2012)
- No Judge Me (2012)
- E go Better (2015)
- On Va Gerer (2015)
- Femme ft Rude Bway (2015)
- C’est Faux (2016)
- Kemayo
- Jamais Jamais
- Je T’aime ft Hiro (2016)
- Partout (2017)
- Je suis désolé (2018)
- On se connait pas (2018)
- Je suis à toi (2018)
- Patronne (2019)
- Amen (2019)
- Zege Zege (2020)
- Asabe (2020)
- Time (2020)
- Jei Jei (2021)
- Choisir (2022)

=== Collaboration ===
- X Maleya – Maria
- Revolution – C’est Pas Ma Faute
- Better Featuring Wax Dey
- Que Ce Qui N’a Pas Marcher featuring (Alpha Better Artists)
- Higher Higher Featuring (Alpha Better Artists)
- Fap Kolo Featuring Salatiel
- Supporter Featuring Locko –
- Love na Love Remix Featuring (Charly B)
- Clando Featuring Blaise B and Salatiel
- Madame Tout le Monde Featuring (Rhythmz )
- Jamais Jamais remix Featuring Flavour N'abania

== Awards and recognition ==
Year	Award	Category	Result
2017	All Africa Music Awards (AFRIMA)	Central Africa Best Male artist	Nominated
2016	Balafon Music Awards	3 wards (Song of the Year, Revelation of the Year and Best Male Vocal Performance.)	Won
2017	African Entertainment Awards USA	Best Male Single: Jamais-Jamais	Won

== See also ==
- List of Cameroonians
- List of African musicians
