= Anne Marthe Mvoto =

Cameroonian journalist and politician

- Born: Atok, Cameroon
- Occupations: Journalist, politician
- Years active: 1980s–present
- Notable work: Second woman to present television news in Cameroon

Anne Marthe Mvoto is a Cameroonian journalist and politician, the second woman to anchor television news after Dénise Epoté.

== Early life ==
Anne Marthe Mvoto hails from Atok, the village of General Angouand situated between Abong-Mbang and Ayos. She has a fervent interest in the audiovisual and journalism professions and pursued her studies at the Lille school in France. Marthe Mvoto initiated her career at Radio Cameroon in the 1980.

== Career ==
Between 1991 and 2008 Anne Marthe Mvoto served as the presenter of television news at Cameroon Radio and Television (CRTV).

After nearly 20 years of anchoring television news, she was dismissed by her employer two years before her retirement. She engaged a lawyer, and eventually, both parties reached an amicable settlement.

In 2010, following her departure from public television, she launched her own magazine to express herself differently.

In December 2016, eight years after departing CRTV, she made a comeback on screen as a guest on the morning show to discuss her new professional endeavors.

In 2016 she managed the commercial aspect of a new weekly magazine.

In 2020 former TV anchor Anne Marthe Mvoto contested as a member of the regional council of the Eastern region, her hometown, but unfortunately, she lost the election.
