= Denise Epoté =

Cameroonian journalist

Denise Laurence Djengué Epoté
- Born: 22 November 1954 (age 71); Nkongsamba, Cameroon
- Education: International School of Journalism in Yaoundé
- Occupation: Journalist
- Known for: Ranked Forbes Africa, 100 most influential figures
- Parents: Jean Claude Epoté (father); Mispa Florina Mbella (mother)

Denise Laurence Djengué Epoté, (born 22 November 1954) is a Cameroonian journalist and the head of African reporting for the French television network, TV5 Monde.

She was the first journalist to present the news in French on national public television, Cameroon Television (CTV), which later became known as the Cameroon Radio Television (CRTV).

In January 2022, At the end of the press group’s board of directors, Denise Epoté was appointed three times as Marketing Director of TV5Monde, PCA of TV5Monde USA and PCA of TV5Monde Latin America, taking office on February 1, 2022.

== Life ==
She was born in Nkongsamba, Cameroon on 22 November 1954. Her father, Jean Claude Epoté, was a civil servant and financial controller, and her mother, Mizpah Florina Mbella, worked at the treasury of Douala. Both are now retired.

She was the eldest of a family of two girls and two boys. After her secondary education at Lycée Général Leclerc in Yaounde, Epoté was admitted to the International School of Journalism in Yaoundé, which is known now as the Graduate School of Science and Yaounde Techniques of Information and Communication. In 1991, she married the deputy director of major works, Mr. Durand; they were later divorced.

== Career ==
In 1981, she began her career at Radio Cameroon and in 1985, she became the first female presenter of the Cameroon national chain. With her English-speaking colleague Eric Chinje, the two presented the news from 1985 to 1993. She left the Cameroon Radio Television (CRTV) in 1993, moving to TV5 Monde and Radio France International.

In February 2010, Epoté was honored during the 4th Night of Builders.

== Broadcasts ==
Since 1999, Epoté has hosted a weekly show called "and if you tell me the whole truth." The show is a forum open to all those who are interested in the future of Africa.

In 2009, to celebrate the 10th anniversary of the show, Epoté received the President of Mali, Amadou Toumani Touré; by that time, the program had already presented 200 guests. Since its launch, Epoté has interviewed numerous personalities including Andry Rajoelina, Omar Bongo Ondimba, James Alix Michel, General Mohamed Ould Abdel Aziz, and Aminata Traoré.

She is the head of African reporting for TV5Monde, a French television network, and hosts a program that allows journalists from the French Libération Journal to discuss the news of the continent.

On Sundays, she shares her vision of the African news from the past week through her presentation, "The Week of Denise Epoté," on Radio France Internationale.

In January 2022, At the end of the press group’s board of directors, Denise Epoté was appointed three times as Marketing Director of TV5Monde, PCA of TV5Monde USA and PCA of TV5Monde Latin America, taking office on February 1, 2022.

== Awards ==
In 2014, Epoté was ranked among the hundred most influential figures on the continent in the New African and Forbes Africa rankings.

- 2001: Best Journalist Award at the Panafrican Broadcasting Heritage and Achievement Awards
- 2006: Knight of the National Order of Merit French
- 2006: Knight of the Cameroonian Order of Merit
- 2006: Officer of Arts and Letters of Burkina Faso
- 2006: Knight of the National Order of Merit of Senegal
- 2013: Knight of the Legion of Honor, highest French honorary distinction
- 2013: Prize offered by the people of Medina-Mary in Senegal

== See also ==
- List of Cameroonians
