= Wax Dey =

Cameroonian singer and social activist

- Also known as: Wax Dey
- Born: Nde Ndifonka; 9 May 1985 (age 40); Bamenda, Cameroon
- Occupations: Singer, entrepreneur
- Years active: 2006–present
- Labels: Calabash Record

Nde Ndifonka (born 9 May 1985), best known by his stage name Wax Dey, is a Cameroonian singer, and songwriter.

== Early life & career ==
Ndifonka was born in Bamenda and is from the Northwest Region of Cameroon. He was inspired to get into music when his father brought home a VHS cassette.

He began his professional career in 2008 with the release of African Soul with records such as "Butterfly". He released his debut solo album in 2016 360 Degrees featuring artists such as Banky W and Yemi Alade.

In December 2015, he released the Yemi Alade assisted "Saka Makossa" (Dance Makossa) which pays tribute to the Makossa music genre. Wax Dey is also the Producer and main actor of the Cameroonian reality TV contest, Number One Girl, which airs on Equinox TV.

He became a, LuquLuqu Ambassador to the UN in Africa 2017.

In June 2020, Nde Ndifonka released the EP, Rise Again: The Lockdown EP, inspired by the COVID-19 pandemic lockdowns.

== Selected discography ==
- Rise Again: The Lockdown EP (June 2020)
- Final Light (Album) - 2019
- 360 Degrees (album) - 2016
- African Dream - 2010
- African soul - 2008

=== Singles ===
- Mr Arrogant - 2019
- My Heart ft Master KG - 2019
- "I Don See My Wife" (2013) (with Dontom)
- Saka Makossa ft Yemi Alade - 2016
- "Number One Girl"
- "Kiss of the Death"
- Will you be my wifey - 2013
- I don see my wife ft Dontom - 2012

== Awards and recognition ==
He won Best Male Artist in Central Africa at the 2016 All Africa Music Awards (AFRIMA).

In December 2020, Wax Dey was knighted with a presidential medal as Chevalier of the Order of Valour of Cameroon.

Year	Award	Category	Recipient	Result
2016	AFRIMA Award	Best Male Artist in Central Africa	Himself	Won
2019	AFRIMA Award	Best African Pop	Himself	Nominated

== See also ==
- List of Cameroonians
- List of African musicians
