= Julienne Niat =

Cameroonian politician (1927 – 2009)

Julienne Niat Ngoumou
- Born: 1927; Bana, West Region, Cameroon
- Died: 2009 (aged 81–82)
- Occupation: Politician
- Known for: First woman to run for legislative elections in Cameroon
- Spouse: Ngoumou
- Children: Margaret Sanga Ngassa

Julienne Niat Ngoumou (1927 in Bana, West Region, Cameroon – 2009) was a Cameroonian politician. She was the president of the first national movement of Cameroonian women (Assofecam) in 1950 and the first woman to run for legislative elections in Cameroon in November 1951.

== Biography ==
=== Childhood and beginnings ===
Julienne Niat was born in 1927 in Bana. She belonged to the royal court of Bana and was involved in the management of the kingdom at a very young age, where she gained great experience in political life. She was a teacher by training, graduating from the first class of the Yaoundé higher school.

== Political career ==
In the early 1950s, she was the president of Assofecam, the first national movement of Cameroonian women and president of the Youth Council of Cameroon, a movement affiliated with the World Assembly of Youth. In November 1951, she ran for elections to the territorial assembly of French Cameroon (Atcam). She was nominated as a candidate for the Representative Assembly by ESOCAM (Social Evolution of Cameroon, a party created in 1949). She is the first woman in all of the Trust Territories of Africa to run as a candidate. She was single and several months pregnant when she began her electoral campaign. When the baby was born, she placed her baby's cradle in her country van and took it everywhere with her.

She suffered two electoral defeats between 1951 and 1952, defeats attributed to the shenanigans of her male opponents who did not support the candidacy of a single woman. In 1951, the right to vote was granted only to women with at least two children. In 1952, Julienne Niat brought together women from different professions and social classes and founded the Union of Cameroonian Women (UFC) with Marie Irene Ngapeth and Marthe Moumie, also teachers and wives of nationalist executives. Through this feminist movement, the women of the UFC demanded "the right to vote, improvement in the social, health and economic conditions of women, gender equality, but also equality between white women living in Cameroon and black women".

In December 1956, she stood for the second time as a candidate in the legislative elections constituting the Legislative Assembly of Cameroon (Alcam). Julienne Niat, who became Julienne Ngoumou after her marriage, is nicknamed the Joan of Arc of Cameroon. She was once again the only female candidate in this election but did not win a seat in the new assembly. It was finally Julienne Keutcha in 1960 who became the first female elected deputy of Cameroon.

== Private life ==
Julienne Niat was the mother of Margaret Sanga Ngassa, with Félix Ngoumou as the father. Margaret Sanga was a Cameroonian doctor and philanthropist, a pioneer in the fight against AIDS in Cameroon and one of the founders of the NGO SWAA Littoral, a branch of the Society for Women and Aids in Africa (SWAA).
