= Dsamou Micheline =

Cameroonian pharmacist and politician

Micheline Dsamou
- Born: Micheline Moutio; 1 June 1947 (age 78); Bangangté, Cameroon
- Occupations: Pharmacist; politician; businesswoman
- Years active: 1975–present
- Known for: Serving as a senator in the Cameroonian parliament

Micheline Dsamou (born Micheline Moutio, 1 June 1947) is a Cameroonian pharmacist and politician. She has served as a senator in the Cameroonian parliament since March 2018.

== Early life ==
Micheline Dsamou was born in Bangangté, in the West Region of Cameroon. For her primary-school education, she attended the public school in New Bell, a working-class neighborhood in the city of Douala. She pursued her secondary education at Noutong College in Bangangté, then at the girls' high school in Douala, and finally at the Lycée d'Etampes in France. In the early 1970s, she enrolled at the Faculty of Medicine and Pharmacy in Angers, obtaining a pharmacy diploma.

== Career ==
Dsamou is also an entrepreneur. After completing her studies, she decided to return to Cameroon to contribute to the country's development during an economic boom period.

Upon her return, she acquired the Guely pharmacy from a French expatriate. At the age of 28, she established the Pharmacie du Soleil in Yaoundé in 1975. In 1986, she established Pharmacam, a pharmaceutical distribution company, and in the early 1990s, she ventured into transit and logistics with the creation of Line Transit.

She holds leadership positions in several other companies.

== Political career ==
In September 2011, Dsamou was elected as an alternate member of the central committee of the Cameroon People's Democratic Movement, and in 2018, she was elected as a senator. She was re-elected as a senator in March 2023.
