= Bakweri Town =

Bakweri Town, is one of the quarters of Buea, the capital of the Southwest Region of Cameroon. It is a vast and fast-growing community that has a dense population and multiple functional businesses. It has over the years been known for its dense traffic, bad roads and high crime rate.

== Location ==
Located between Clerks Quarters; closer to the mountain and Sand Pit to the South, it is bordered by Small Soppo to the West and Buea Town to the East.

== Geography ==
=== Population ===
Made up of farmers, businesspeople, students and administrators, Bakweri Town has a growing population as more people continue to move into the community and Buea at large due to the ongoing sociopolitical unrest in the English-Speaking regions of Cameroon.

=== Climate ===
Buea has a subtropical highland climate, with high humidity because of its location at the foot of Mount Cameroon. Neighborhoods at higher elevations enjoy cooler temperatures, while neighborhoods at lower elevations experience hotter temperatures. Bakweri Town with its high elevation benefits from the cool temperatures with higher rainfalls than the rest of the Buea descends. it is characterized by high fog, drizzles, and heavy rainfall in the rainy season.

== Notable sites ==
- OIC Buea
- Salvation Pharmacy
- First Trust
- Executive Hotel

== Gallery ==
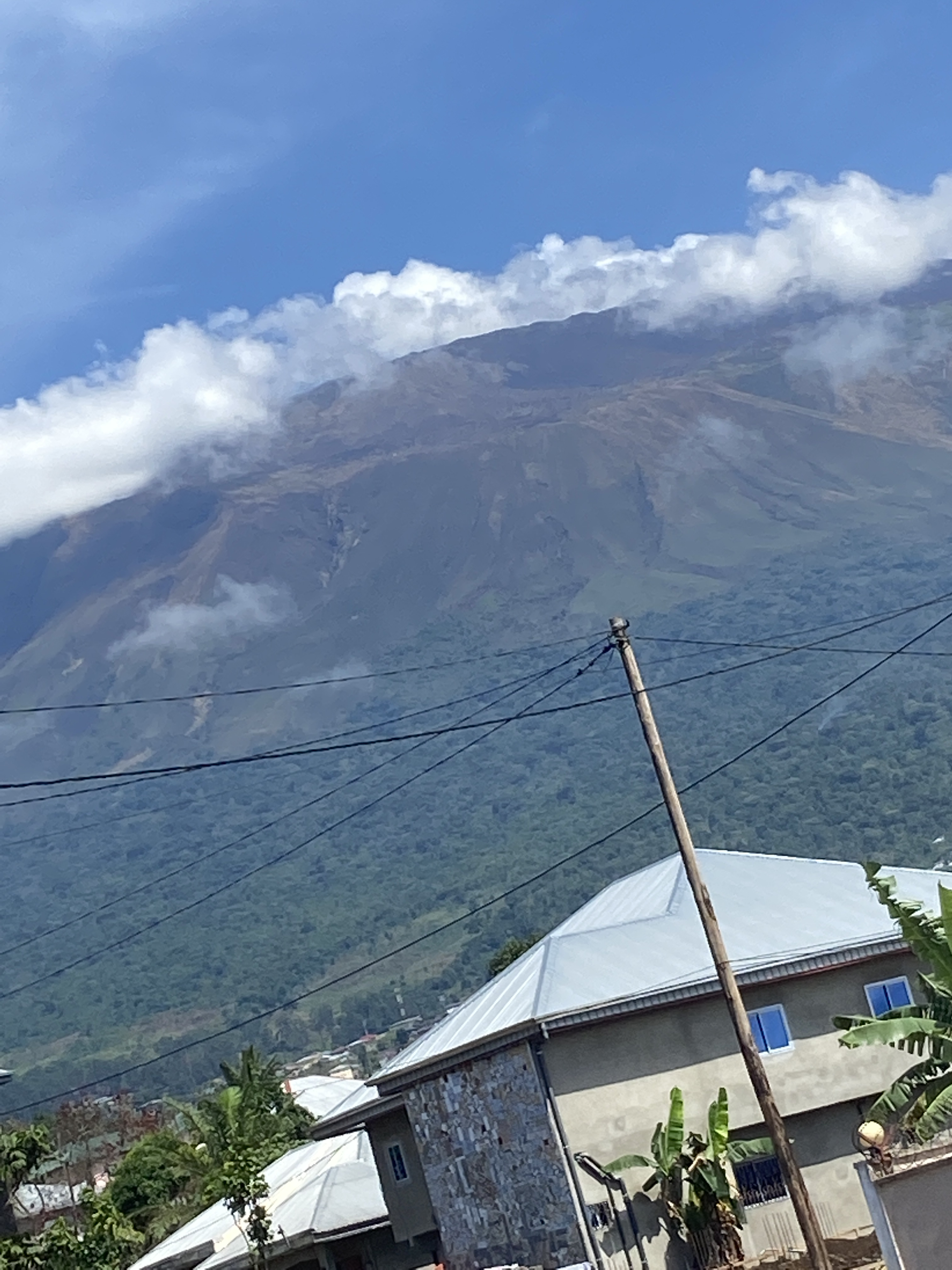
A view of Mount Fako from Bakweri Town
