= Mireille Nemale =

Cameroonian fashion stylist, entrepreneur and educator

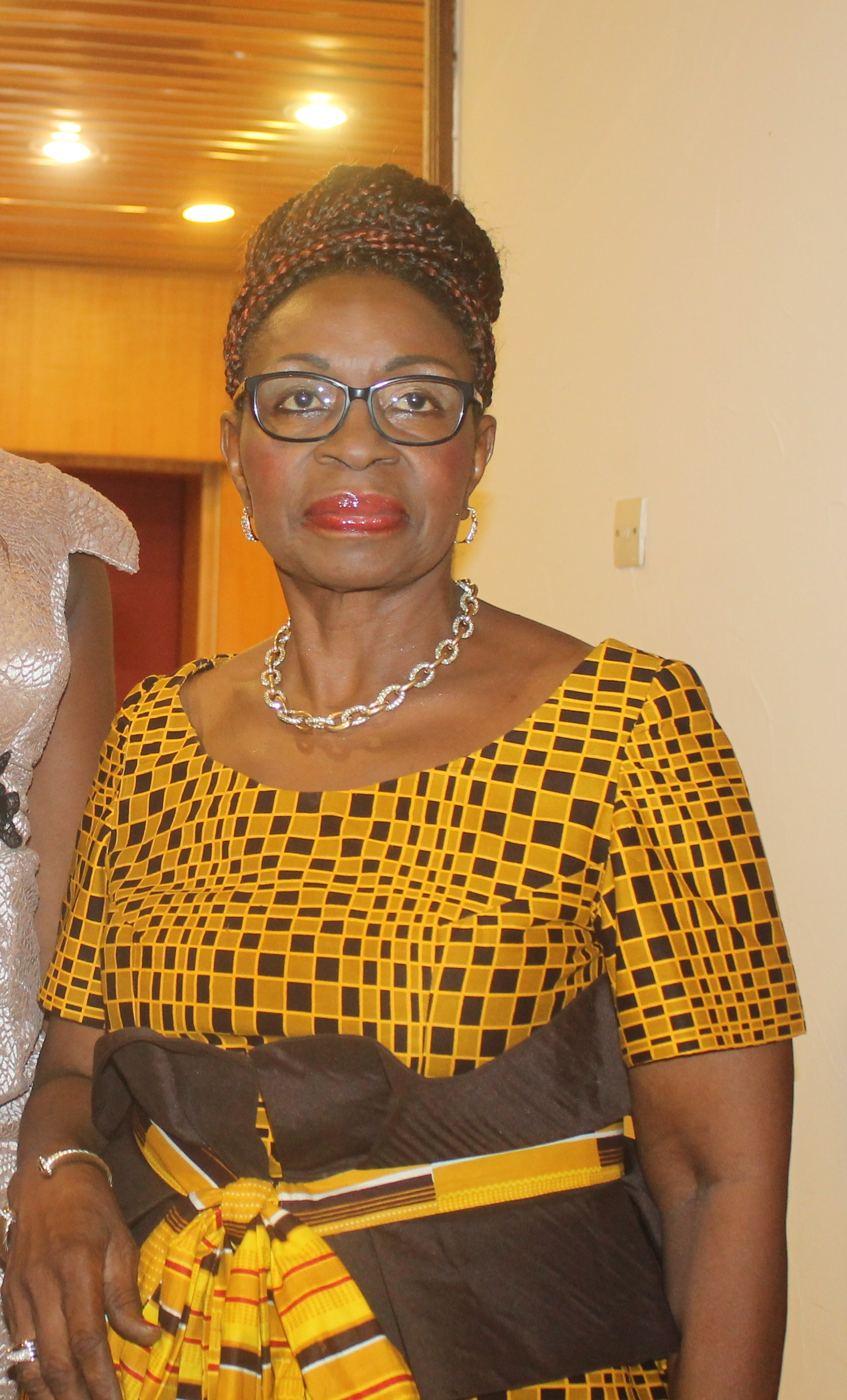
- Born: 1949 (age 76–77); Baboutcheu-Ngaleu West Region
- Occupations: Activist; Fashion stylist; Educator
- Known for: (CAPEC)

Mireille Nemale (née Ngounou; born 1949) is a Cameroonian fashion stylist, entrepreneur and educator. In 1973, she became the first African woman to graduate in haute couture from the École de la chambre syndicale de la couture parisienne. Despite becoming widowed when only 26, she taught for many years at the CETIC institute in Douala.

On retiring in 2009, she concentrated on training students at the New Fashion Academy which she had founded in 1993. As a result, some 300 Cameroonians have since entered the fashion profession at home and abroad. Nemale's distinctions include Commander of the Order of Valour.

== Biography ==
Born on 24 June 1949 in Baboutcheu-Ngaleu in the West Region of Cameroon, Pauline Mireille Ngoumou was one of the family's four daughters. Together with her husband, she moved to Paris where she studied at the Chambre syndicale de la couture. In 1972, she became the first African to receive the school's diploma in haute couture.

Eighteen months after she returned to Cameroon, her husband died while she was expecting her third child. Widowed at the age of 26, she persevered both at home and at work. In 1973, she was engaged as a teacher at the CETIC specialist school in Doula. Promoted first as head of practical work, she was later given the title of provincial technical education inspector. She retired from the school in 2009.

In 1993, Nemale founded New Fashion Academy, a vocational training establishment which specializes in fashion, modelling and decoration. As of May 2021, she was still running the establishment, having already trained some 300 students who were able to take up a profession in Cameroon or abroad.

For her dedication, in 2010 she was honoured with the Cameroonian Order of Valour.
