= Marie Catherine Abena =

Cameroonian civil servant, politician and author

Secretary of State
- In office December 2004 – 2009
- Prime Minister: Ephraïm Inoni

Personal details
- Born: March 20, 1954 Yaoundé, French Cameroon
- Died: March 19, 2014 (aged 59) Yaoundé, Cameroon
- Occupation: Civil servant, politician, author

Marie Catherine Abena (March 20, 1954 – March 19, 2014) was a Cameroonian civil servant, politician, and author. She served as the Secretary of State at the Ministry of Secondary Education from December 2004 to 2009 in the government of prime minister Ephraïm Inoni.

== Biography ==
=== Early life and career ===
Marie Catherine Abena was born on March 20, 1954, in Yaoundé, Cameroon. She hailed from Awaé in the Centre Region of Cameroon, being the eldest of nine children born to Manga Pauline Jacqueline and the late Abena Hubert Claude, a civil administrator and former prefect.

=== Career ===
A graduate of the École Normale Supérieure in Yaoundé, Marie Catherine Abena initially worked as a high school teacher. Before her appointment as Secretary of State for Secondary Education in December 2004, she served as a provincial inspector of French pedagogy in the Centre Province. Later, she became the head of the Yaoundé resource center and subsequently the national inspector of French pedagogy.

=== Legal issues ===
On January 8, 2010, she was incarcerated at the Kondengui Central Prison as part of Operation Sparrowhawk (Opération Épervier). She faced accusations of embezzling public funds amounting to 250 million CFA francs, along with nine other co-accused individuals. Following the ruling by the Mfoundi High Court, she was placed in pretrial detention. Proclaiming her innocence, she embarked on a hunger strike, deteriorating her health and spending more time in the hospital than in prison. She died on March 19, 2014, at the CNPS Hospital in Yaoundé.

== Publications ==
- Sur les traces de Pépé, CCINIA, June 20, 2008.

== See also ==
- Mireille Adaré Gassawily
