= Agnes Ntube Ndode =

Cameroonian politician

Agnès Ntube Ndode
- Citizenship: Cameroon
- Occupations: Politician, Businesswoman
- Years active: Since 2013
- Known for: Serving as a senator and president of Gfac
- Political party: Rdpc
- Spouse: Mr. Ndjock

Agnès Ntube Ndode is a Cameroonian business woman and politician who has been a senator since 2013. She was elected president of the Group of Women Entrepreneurs of Cameroon (GFAC) in 2015. Ndode is the commissioner in charge of god governance for the World Association of Female Entrepreneurs in West Africa.

== Biography ==
Ndode is a senator from the South-West region of Cameroon. She is affiliated with the RDPC and was re-elected as senator for the third time in March 2023. She succeeded the late Francoise Foning as the head of the Group of Women Entrepreneurs of Cameroon on September 29, 2015. Before her election to this position, she served as the first vice-president of this organization for 7 years and president of the GFAC branch for her region for 24 years.

== Personal life ==
Ndode is married to Mr. Ndjock.
