= Martin Dibobe =

Cameroon train driver and activist (1876–1922)

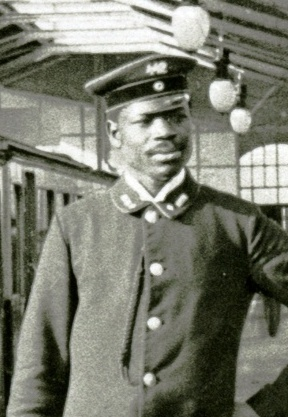
- Born: 31 October 1876; Bonaprise, Cameroon
- Disappeared: 1922
- Died: c. 1922; Liberia
- Occupations: Train driver; activist
- Spouse: Helene Noster (m. 1900)

Martin Dibobe (31 October 1876 – 1922) was a Cameroon-born train driver in Berlin during the period of the German Empire. He was born in Bonaprise, Cameroon and is presumed to have died in Liberia sometime after 1922. His original name was Quane a Dibobe but he was christened Martin Dibobe by missionaries. At the age of 20 he went to Germany to represent Cameroon (then a German colony) at the Great Industrial Exposition of Berlin in 1896 where his role at the Treptower Park was to portray 'African daily life'. Together with many other Africans, all from the then German colonies, he spent six months at the exhibition as an 'exhibit'. When the exhibition ended he stayed in Berlin and started an apprenticeship as an industrial mechanic with the firm Conrad Schultz in Strausberg.

== Background ==
Early in 1900 he became engaged to Helene Noster, the daughter of his landlord, and they married in the same year despite objections from the German colonial authorities. In 1902 he worked as a dispatcher with the Berlin U-Bahn soon rising to train driver, first class. As such he rapidly became something of a celebrity. Dibobe kept in touch with his homeland and after the First World War championed the restitution of the former German colonies.

He openly sympathised with the views of the German Social Democrats and championed equal status for Africans. Together with 17 other Africans from the former colonies, who proposed that he be their permanent representative to the Reichstag, he presented a petition to that body on 27 June 1919 calling for independence and civil rights for all persons in and from those colonies. One of the signatories was Mandenga Diek.

== Disappearance ==
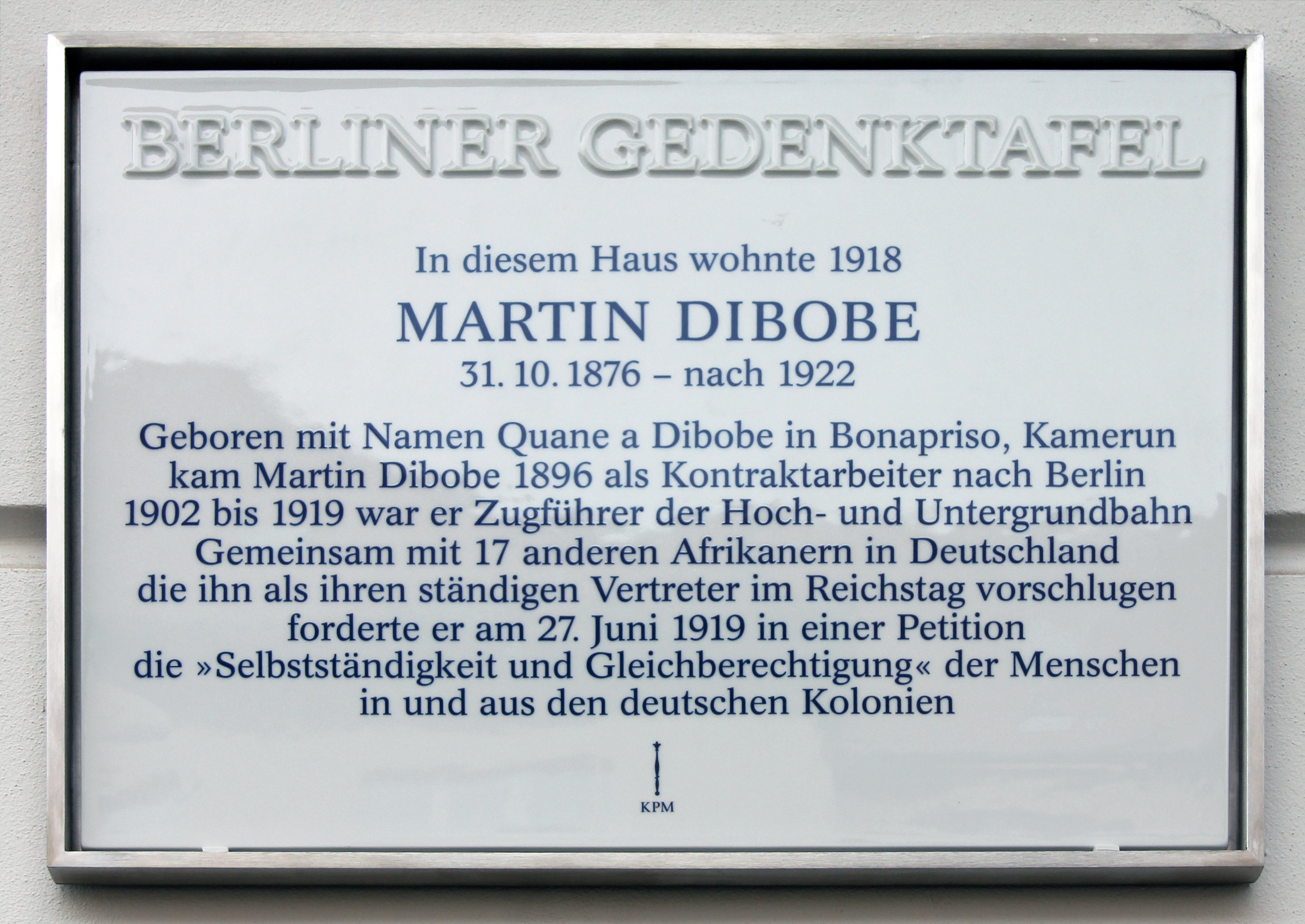
Commemorative plaque at Kuglerstr 44, Berlin-Prenzlauer Berg

In 1922, he decided to return to Africa with his family at his own expense. They traveled by ship to Douala in Cameroon to settle some property matters there, which was now under French control. The French, fearing that he would instigate a revolt in favour of the Germans, refused to allow him to disembark. He had no alternative but to travel on to Liberia. At this point all trace of him was lost, but it seems likely that he died in Liberia.

== See also ==
- List of people who disappeared mysteriously: 1910–1990
