= Lucy Gwanmesia =

Cameroonian politician

- Born: November 26, 1941; Buea, British Cameroon
- Died: June 4, 2019 (aged 77); Yaoundé, Cameroon
- Education: National School of Administration and Magistracy (1970); Institute of Advanced Legal Studies, University of London (1987) (Certificate in drafting legal texts and international law); University of Strasbourg, France (1992) (Certificate in human rights)
- Occupations: Judge, Politician
- Known for: Minister Delegate at the Presidency overseeing Higher State Control of Cameroon (1997-2001)
- Children: 5

Lucy Gwanmesia (November 26, 1941 – June 4, 2019) was a Cameroonian judge and politician. She served as Minister Delegate at the Presidency overseeing Higher State Control of Cameroon from December 7, 1997, to April 27, 2001.

== Biography ==
Lucy Gwanmesia was born on November 26, 1941, in Buea, in the Fako department, in the South-West region of Cameroon, to parents originally from Bali, in the North-West region of Cameroon. She graduated in law at the National School of Administration and Magistracy in 1970, and later obtained a certificate in drafting legal texts and international law from the Institute of Advanced and Legal Studies, University of London in 1987. Five years later, in 1992, she earned a certificate in human rights from the University of Strasbourg in France. Lucy Gwanmesia was a mother of five children.

She died on June 4, 2019, in Yaoundé at the age of 77 after a long illness.

== Career ==
Throughout her career, she held various leadership positions in the Cameroonian judicial system as well as in other countries. She served as Vice-president of the South-West Court of Appeal in Buea and Deputy Director of Judicial Professions Control at the Ministry of Justice. Additionally, she was an Advisor to the Supreme Court from 1988.

From December 26, 1989, to 1994, she was appointed as a substitute member of the Superior Council of the Judiciary. From December 7, 1997, to April 27, 2001, she served as Minister Delegate to the Presidency overseeing Higher State Control.

She spent four years in this role in the government of Prime Minister Peter Mafany Musonge.
