= Sarah Nwanak =

Cameroonian politician

Sarah Nwanak (born 1941) is a Cameroonian politician.

== Life ==
Sarah Nwanak was born on 27 October 1941 in Makak. She started her career as a teacher. From 1970 to 1972 she was a member of the Legislative Assembly of West Cameroon, serving as vice-president of the Commission of Legislation and Administrative Affairs. From 1972 to 1978 she was a member of the Economic and Social Council. In 1978 she was re-elected a member of the National Assembly.
