= Joseph Akongo =

Cameroonian footballer

Personal information
- Date of birth: 27 November 1977 (age 48)
- Place of birth: Yaounde, Cameroon
- Position: Forward

Senior career*
Years	Team	Apps	(Gls)
2002	Peñarol		
- * Club domestic league appearances and goals

Joseph Akongo (born 27 November 1977) is a Cameroonian former professional footballer who played as a forward.

== Career ==
Akongo was born in Yaounde, Cameroon. He played in 2002 for Peñarol of Uruguay. He became the first African to score in a Copa Libertadores match for a Uruguayan team.
