= Nkolafamba =

Coordinates: 3.8589°N 11.6649°E

- Commune and town
- Interactive map of Nkolafamba
- Country: Cameroon
- Time zone: UTC+1 (WAT)

Nkolafamba is a town and commune in Cameroon.

== See also ==
- Communes of Cameroon
