= Laurentine Mbede =

Cameroonian politician (died 2026)

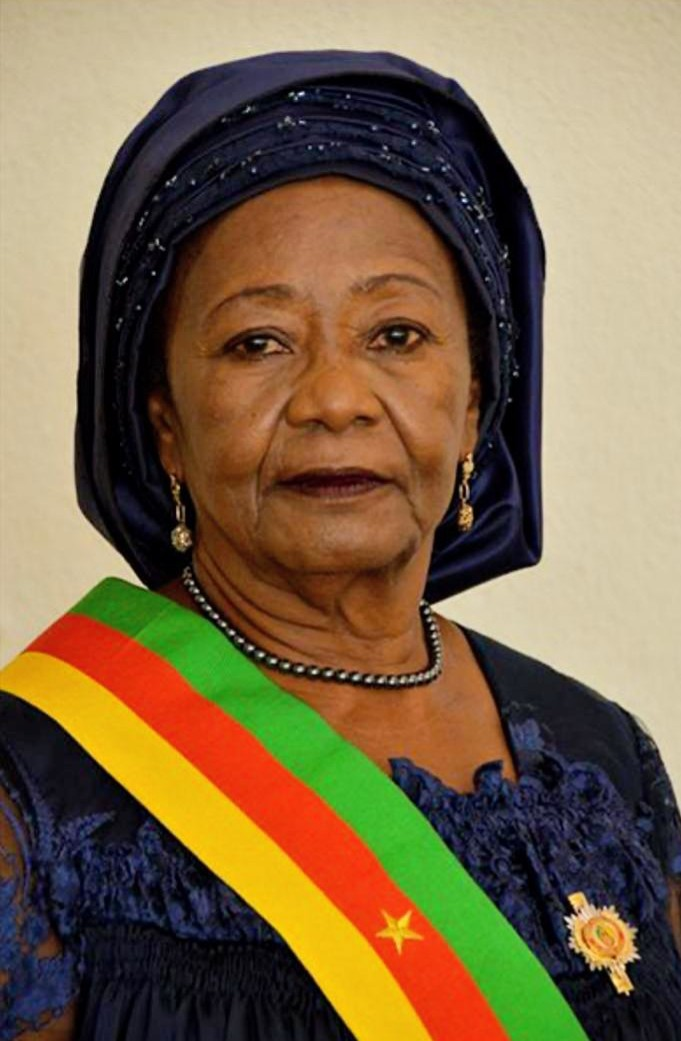

Member of the National Assembly of Cameroon
- In office 2012 – 22 January 2026

Mayor of Soa Commune
- In office 2002–2012

Personal details
- Born: Laurentine Koa Mfegue; 6 August 1945
- Died: 22 January 2026
- Party: Cameroon People's Democratic Movement (CPDM)
- Spouse: Joseph Mbede (m. 1971; died 2019)
- Children: 6, including Jacques Mbede
- Profession: Politician
- Committees: Foreign Affairs Committee

Laurentine Mbede (died 22 January 2026), previously known as Laurentine Koa Mfegue, was a Cameroonian politician. She served as a deputy, senior member of the National Assembly of Cameroon from 2012, and she held a position on the Foreign Affairs Committee.

== Early life ==
Laurentine Mbede was born Koa Mfegue in Ottotomo (close to the city Ngoumou) Cameroon on 6 August 1945 into the Mvog Fouda community.

== Political career ==
In 2002, she was elected as the mayor of Soa community, situated in the Mefou-et-Afamba department of the Central region of Cameroon, following the municipal elections of that year. She joined the National Assembly of Cameroon during its 9th legislature in June 2012. Within the National Assembly, she was a dedicated member of the Foreign Affairs Committee and has continued her service in this capacity until 2024.

On 10 March 2020, Laurentine Mbede was honored with the title of the oldest member during the inaugural session of the assembly.

Apart from her political engagements, she advocated for increased female participation in city management affairs, notably through the Democracy for Women initiative, which gathers women from various backgrounds across the country.

In March 2024, during her opening address at the first parliamentary session of the year, she made a significant statement openly criticizing deputies and reprimanding them for their lack of action and absenteeism, among other issues.

== Personal life and death ==
On 12 April 1971, she married Joseph Mbede, a professor and former health minister. Together, they had six children including Jacques Mbede (executive director in IT and Telecommunications). Her husband died on 19 March 2019.

Laurentine Mbede died on 22 January 2026.
