= Hermann Kamte =

Cameroonian architect and designer

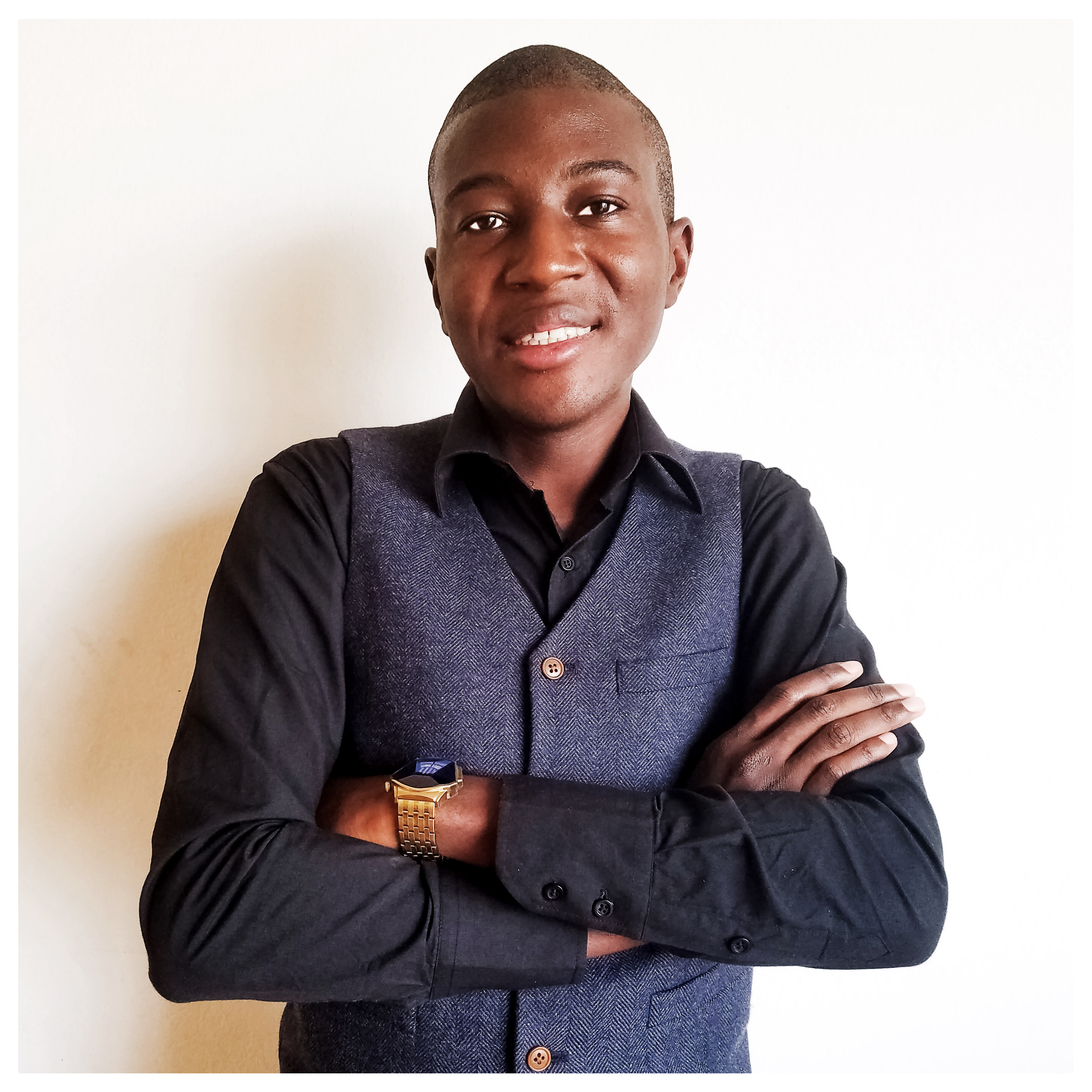
- Born: February 20, 1992 (age 34); Yaoundé, Cameroon
- Citizenship: Cameroon
- Education: École Africaine des Métiers de l'Architecture et de l'Urbanisme (EAMAU)
- Occupation: Architect
- Years active: 2016–present
- Awards: Architecture MasterPrize (2017), WAFX Prize (World Architecture Festival2017)
- Practice: Hermann Kamte & Associates (HKA)
- Projects: Lagos Wooden Tower, Native Skyscraper
- Website: www.hermann-kamte.com

Hermann Kamte (born 20 February 1992) is a Cameroonian architect specializing in sustainable architecture and the use of bio-sourced materials, particularly timber. He gained recognition for his conceptual project Lagos Wooden Tower, a proposed skyscraper made of wood for the city of Lagos, Nigeria.

== Early life and education ==
Hermann Kamte was born on 20 February 1992 in Yaoundé, Cameroon. In 2011, after one year of physics studies at the University of Ngaoundéré in the Adamawa Region of Cameroon, Kamte received a scholarship to attend the École africaine des métiers de l'architecture et de l'urbanisme (EAMAU) in Lomé, Togo. In 2016, he earned a master's degree in Architecture.

== Career ==
After completing his studies, Hermann Kamte joined Urbatech Conseils, where he served as head of the architecture department and worked alongside founder Virgin Claude Ndjinga Ndjinga.

In 2017, Hermann Kamte founded Hermann Kamte & Associates (HKA), an agency based in Yaoundé, Cameroon. HKA operates in the fields of architecture, urban planning, design, education, and research.

== Projects ==
=== Lagos Wooden Tower ===
The Lagos Wooden Tower / Abebe Court Tower is a conceptual residential timber tower project in the Ikoyi district of Lagos, Nigeria. The proposed structure integrates sustainable architecture, ecological densification, and Yoruba cultural references. Designed using laminated veneer lumber (LVL), it emphasizes natural ventilation, daylight integration, and vegetation through suspended gardens and green belts.

=== Other notable projects ===
- The Forgotten – Dead or Alive: A proposal for the regeneration of Lake Chad through a limnology center and a desalination plant connected to the Atlantic Ocean. The conceptual project takes the form of a self-sufficient amphibious structure, articulated in three phases until 2080: study, reforestation, and natural regeneration.
- Native Skyscraper: A conceptual skyscraper inspired by the baobab tree and African vernacular architectural forms. Designed for tropical cities, the project uses a mixed structure (wood, steel, concrete) with suspended gardens, green walls, and modular spaces.
- Fine Flower – Dubai Heart: A leisure park project designed as an artificial island in the shape of a flower and heart, proposed to the municipality of Dubai in 2017. It combines aesthetics, nature, and high technology around the elements of water, air, and earth, featuring artificial waterfalls, slides, sports and cultural areas, and panoramic restaurants.

== Recognition and awards ==
The Lagos Wooden Tower project received several distinctions in 2017, including the Architecture Master Prize, the A'Design Award, and the WAFX Prize at the World Architecture Festival in the cultural identity category.

=== Selected awards ===
- 2017: Architecture MasterPrize – Green Architecture
- 2017: WAFX Prize – Cultural Identity category
- 2017: World Architecture Festival – Future Project Award finalist
- 2017: A'Design Awards Bronze Trophy – Architecture category
- 2018: Eurasian Prize Gold Trophy – Tall Building category
- 2019: Forbes Africa 30 Under 30 – Creative category
- 2019: Quartz Africa Innovators

== Speaking engagements and conferences ==
In 2018, Hermann Kamte served as a speaker at Architecture ZA 2018, organized from 3 to 5 May 2018 by the South African Institute of Architects (SAIA) in Pretoria, South Africa, on the theme "We The City: Memories and Resilience". He participated in the Africa 2018 Forum in Sharm el-Sheikh alongside président Paul Kagame from Rwanda and president Abdel Fattah el-Sisi from Egypt. He was selected among the 30 young African creators at the 8th Africities Summit in Morocco, organized by United Cities and Local Governments Africa.

== Exhibitions ==
The Lagos Wooden Tower project was exhibited in London, United Kingdom, from 9 February to 19 May 2018 at the Roca London Gallery as part of the Timber Rising exhibition.

== Architectural approach ==
Hermann Kamte develops an architectural approach focused on cultural contextualization and environmental sustainability. His methodology emphasizes the use of local materials, particularly timber, within a logic of low-carbon footprint production. His projects integrate references to African cultures and vernacular forms. He places exploration and technological innovation at the service of architecture adapted to the contemporary challenges of the African continent.
