= Zakiatou Djamo =

Cameroonian politician

Senator
- Incumbent
- Assumed office April 2018

Comptroller of the Treasury

Personal details
- Born: c. 1958 Doumrou, Mayo-Kani, Cameroon
- Party: RDPC

Zakiatou Djamo (born 1958) is a Cameroonian politician. She held the position of comptroller of the treasury in the government. In April 2018, she was elected as a senator to the Parliament of Cameroon.

== Biography ==
=== Early life ===
Zakiatou Djamo was born around 1958 in the Doumrou area of the mayo-kani department (Kaélé), located in the Far North Region of Cameroon. She belongs to the Moundang tribe. During the 25 March 2018 elections she secured a senatorial position for a 5-year term.

== Political journey ==
Her political journey commenced in 1985 when she became the honorary president of the OFRDPC section and a full member of the central committee of the CPDM. Following the municipal elections of 1987, she was elected as the 2nd deputy mayor of Kaélé. In July 2022, she assumed the role of advisor to the executive office of the Cameroonian Parliamentary Alliances Network for Food and Nutritional Security (RAPACSAN).
