= Mbangassina =

Coordinates: 4.6298°N 11.7068°E

- Commune and town
- Interactive map of Mbangassina
- Country: Cameroon
- Time zone: UTC+1 (WAT)

Mbangassina is a town and commune in Cameroon.

== See also ==
- Communes of Cameroon
- List of municipalities of Cameroon
