= Njoya Tikum =

Cameroonian lawyer (born 1980)

Njoya Hilary Tikum
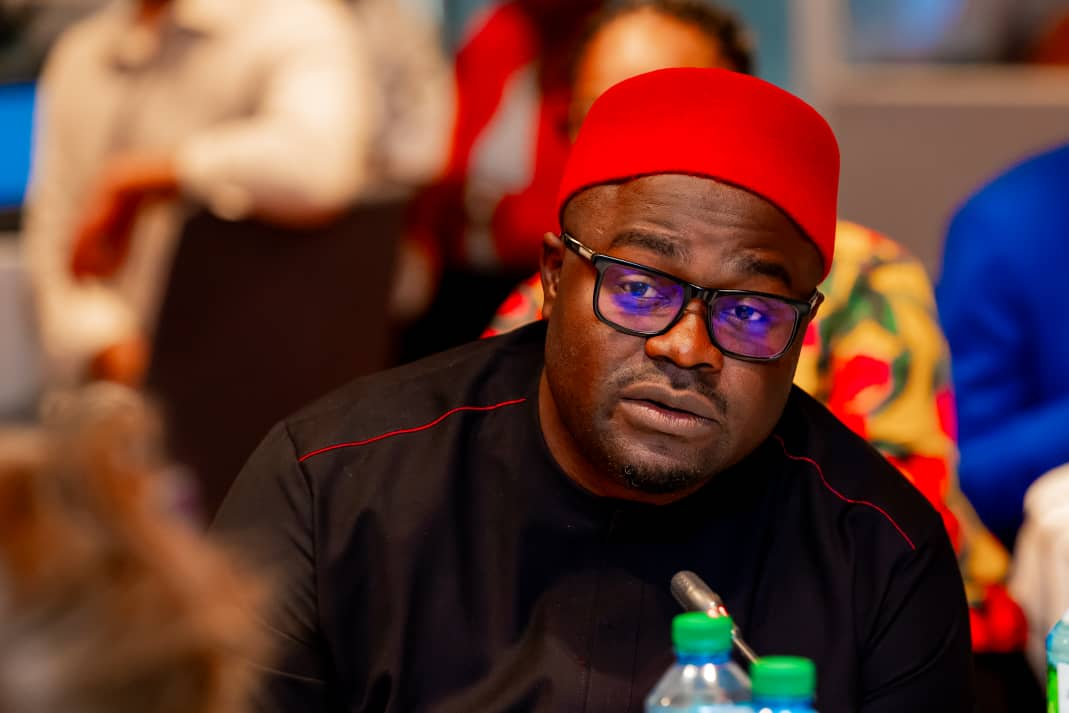
- Njoya Tikum in 2026
- Born: Njoya Hilary Tikum; April 30, 1980 (age 46); Cameroon
- Citizenship: Cameroon
- Education: University of Yaoundé II, Columbia Law School, Central European University, Yale University (Maurice R. Greenberg World Fellow)
- Occupations: Lawyer, development professional, United Nations official
- Employer: United Nations Development Programme
- Title: Director of the Sub‑Regional Hub for West and Central Africa; Resident Representative of UNDP Senegal

Njoya Hilary Tikum is a Cameroonian development professional and United Nations official. He serves as Director of the Sub-Regional Hub for West and Central Africa at the United Nations Development Programme (UNDP) and as Resident Representative of UNDP in Senegal. His work focuses on governance, peacebuilding, and sustainable development across multiple countries in West and Central Africa.

== Early life and education ==
Born on April 30, 1980, Tikum studied law at the University of Yaoundé II, Cameroon, where he obtained a Licence and Maîtrise en Droit. He later earned a Master of Laws (LL.M.) from the Columbia Law School in the United States and an LL.M. in International Business Law from the Central European University in Hungary and Austria.

He was also a Maurice R. Greenberg World Fellow at the Jackson School of Global Affairs at Yale University.

In 2023, Tikum was included in Reputation Poll International’s list of the “100 Most Reputable Africans,” which recognizes public figures across the continent.

== Career ==
Before joining the United Nations system, Tikum worked as an attorney and human rights practitioner. He served as a Senior Human Rights Fellow at the Human Rights Institute of Columbia Law School and as a Legal Associate at the African Services Committee. He also co-founded the Centre for Public Interest Law in Cameroon.

Within the United Nations system, Tikum has held leadership and management roles in both the United Nations Volunteers (UNV) programme and the United Nations Development Programme. He served as Manager and Head of the Regional Office for East and Southern Africa at UNV, where he coordinated regional programmes and institutional operations.

He has also worked with UNDP in Senegal, Ethiopia, Liberia, South Sudan, and at United Nations Headquarters in New York. His work has focused on governance, peacebuilding, anti-corruption, and sustainable development initiatives.

Tikum currently leads policy and programme coordination for UNDP activities across the West and Central Africa sub-region, working with regional institutions and development partners on governance, peace and security, and implementation of the Sustainable Development Goals.

== Publications ==
Tikum has written on governance, anti-corruption, development, and regional integration. His work includes academic contributions and opinion articles in international and African media outlets.

- Tikum, Njoya. “Corruption, conflict and poverty in Africa.” In Conflict and Poverty in Africa: A Research Companion, edited by Ebenezer Durojaye, Gladys Mirugi-Mukundi, John-Mark Iyi, and Usang Maria Assim, Routledge, 2025.
- Tikum, Njoya. “Guerre en Ukraine : ‘Le sort de l’Afrique dépend aussi de sa capacité à renforcer sa souveraineté alimentaire’.” Le Monde, 7 September 2022.
- Tikum, Njoya. Articles on governance, development, and regional integration. Jeune Afrique.
- Tikum, Njoya. Opinion and commentary on global development and multilateral cooperation. TRT Afrika.
- United Nations Development Programme. The Future of Governance: Cohesion and Public Trust. Edited by Njoya Tikum.
- Tikum, Njoya. “Charting a Bold Future.” UNDP Sub-Regional Hub for West and Central Africa blog, 21 April 2025.
- Tikum, Njoya. “A Transition to Renewable Energy in the Sahel.” UNDP Sub-Regional Hub for West and Central Africa blog, 8 August 2024.
- Tikum, Njoya. “Prejudice disguised as critique: The legacy of AU Commission Chair Dlamini-Zuma.” Pambazuka News, 28 July 2016.
