= Buea Town =

Buea Town Mwea
- Neighborhood
- Location in Cameroon
- Coordinates: 4°9′34″N 9°14′12″E
- Country: Cameroon
- Region: Southwest Region
- Division: Fako
- Municipality: Buea
- Founder: Eye Njie Tama Lifanja
- Time zone: UTC+1 (WAT)

Buea Town is a neighborhood located in Buea in the SouthWest Region of Cameroon and was considered as the administrative and most historical part of Buea. It is situated at the foot of Mt Cameron.

Aerial view of Buea from governor's street

== History ==
According to local indigenes and Bakweri legends, this town and neighborhood was founded by a hunter called Eye Njie Tama Lifanja who had earlier named the settlement “Mwea” but later transitioned into Buea due to development and time. The Germans had used it as their capital in 1901–1909 and later became the headquarters of West Cameroon during the British Mandate in 1961

During the German colonial invasion, the original Bakweri village of Buea got destroyed and was later reconstructed at the present neighborhood known as Buea Town. As the town expanded, the neighborhood of Buea town split two; the Buea Town Natives for indigenes and the Buea Town Strangers for non-indigenes and immigrants

== Major establishments ==
This neighborhood is home to key establishments like PCSS (Presbyterian Comprehensive Secondary School), The Buea Town Market, Presbyterian Church Buea Town, the Synod Office, the Governors Office, the Prime Ministers lodge, the 50th anniversary monument.
