= Zacharie Perevet =

Cameroonian politician

Zacharie Perevet (born 1957?) is a Cameroonian politician, currently serving in the government of Cameroon as Minister of Employment and Vocational Training. He has been a member of the government since 1992.

Perevet was born in Gouzda, located in the Mayo-Tsanaga Division of Far North Province. He worked at the Ministry for Agriculture's Directorate of Studies and Projects from 1981 to 1982 and was later in charge of studies at the same directorate from 1986 to 1989. After serving as Director of Agro-Economic Inquiries and Agricultural Planning at the Ministry of Agriculture from 1989 to 1992, he was appointed to the government as Secretary of State at the Ministry of Planning and Spatial Planning on 27 November 1992. He was moved to the post of Secretary of State at the Ministry of Transport on 21 July 1994 before being promoted to the position of Minister of Agriculture on 7 December 1997.

After nearly five years as Minister of Agriculture, he was instead appointed as Minister of Scientific Research and Technology on 24 August 2002. In April 2003, he accompanied a group of scientists who went to Mount Cameroon to install seismographs in the wake of the volcano's June 2000 eruption. On that occasion, he said that the government wanted to do everything it could to prevent natural disasters. He was elected as a Vice-Chairman of the Seventh Session of the Commission on Science and Technology for Development, part of the United Nations Economic and Social Council, on 9 May 2003. Subsequently he was moved to the post of Minister of Employment and Vocational Training on 8 December 2004.

Perevet is a member of the Central Committee of the Cameroonian People's Democratic Movement (RDPC). In the July 2007 municipal election, he headed the RDPC's list in Koza, and it was victorious.
