= Marthe Ekemeyong Moumié =

Cameroonian anti-colonialist writer and activist

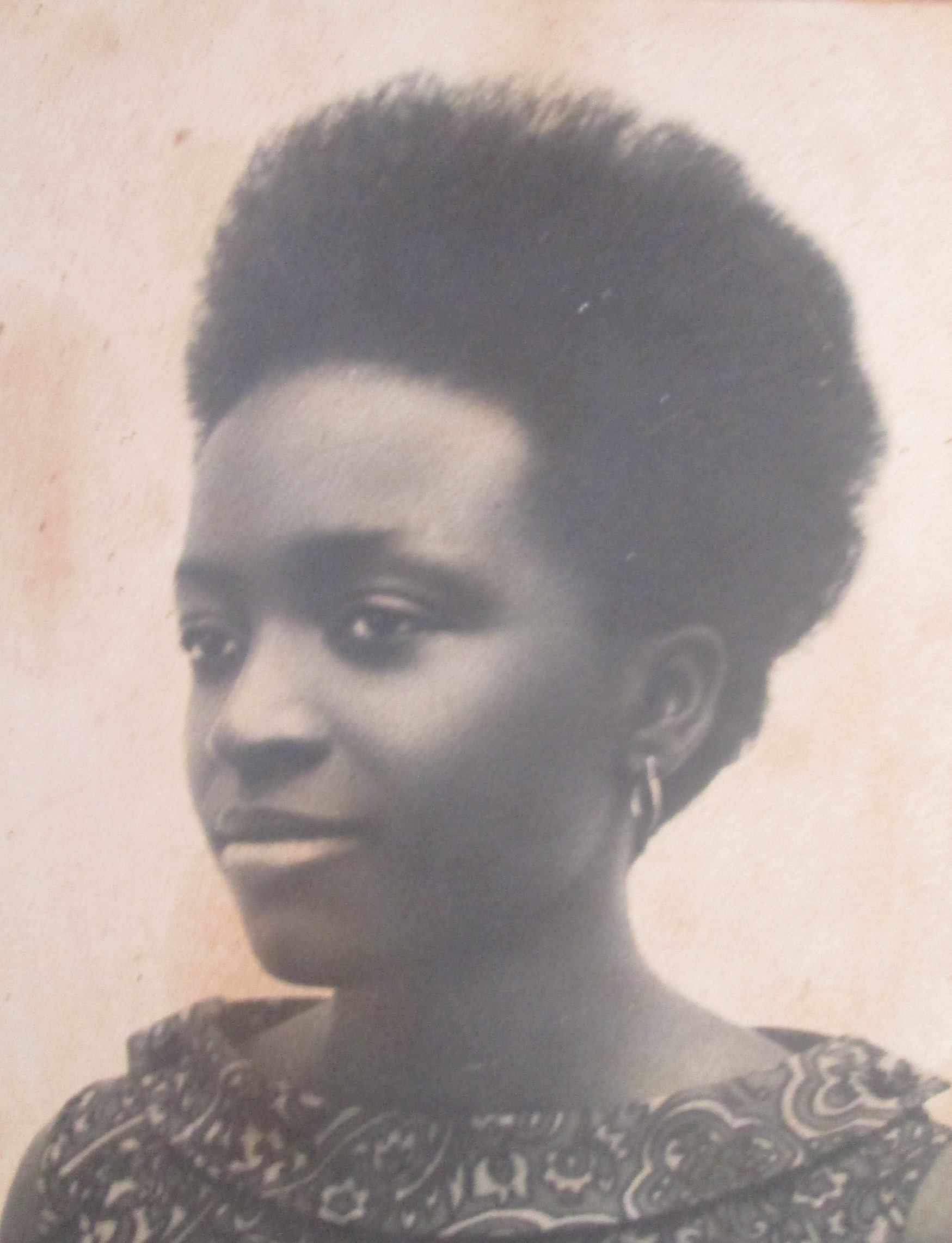
- Born: Marthe Ekemeyong; September 4, 1931; Cameroon
- Died: January 8, 2009 (aged 77); Ebom Essawo, Ebolowa, Cameroon
- Body discovered: January 9, 2009
- Burial place: Ebolowa, Cameroon
- Occupations: Activist and writer
- Political party: Union of the Peoples of Cameroon
- Spouse: Félix-Roland Moumié
- Children: Hélène Moumié

Marthe Ekemeyong Moumié (September 4, 1931 – January 9, 2009) was a Cameroonian anti-colonialist writer and activist. She was a member of the Union of the Peoples of Cameroon, and the former wife of the assassinated political leader Félix-Roland Moumié.

== Political career ==
Marthe Ekemeyong was born on September 4, 1931, in Cameroon. She joined the Union of the Peoples of Cameroon, and was the leader of the Democratic Union of Cameroonian Women. She met and married Cameroonian independence leader Félix-Roland Moumié, leaving the country with him to avoid persecution at the hands of the colonial authorities. They lived in several different countries, including Sudan, and were welcomed by Gamal Abdel Nasser, President of Egypt, when they arrived there. They sent their daughter Hélène to school in China. Moumié was assassinated in 1960 while in Geneva, Switzerland. He was poisoned by thallium.

She subsequently entered into a relationship with Atanasio Ndongo Miyone, a nationalist from Equatorial Guinea. He was executed in 1969 following a failed coup against the Equatoguinean government. Ekemeyong later wrote of her experiences in her autobiography Dans Victime du Colonialisme Français (The Victim of French Colonisation) following his death, when she was imprisoned and tortured for five years by the governments of both Equatorial Guinea and Cameroon.

=== Death ===
She was found dead at her home on January 9, 2009, at the age of 77. Initial media reports suggested that she was murdered via strangulation, and had been raped prior her death. The reports also highlighted that one of her teeth was broken in an apparent struggle. Her body was found by a relative who had heard no response when knocking on her front door. It was thought that the murder took place on the night of January 7/8. The funeral took place later that month on January 31.
