= Ben Duala Ekoko =

Cameroonian judge (1949-2009)

Justice Ekoko Ben Duala
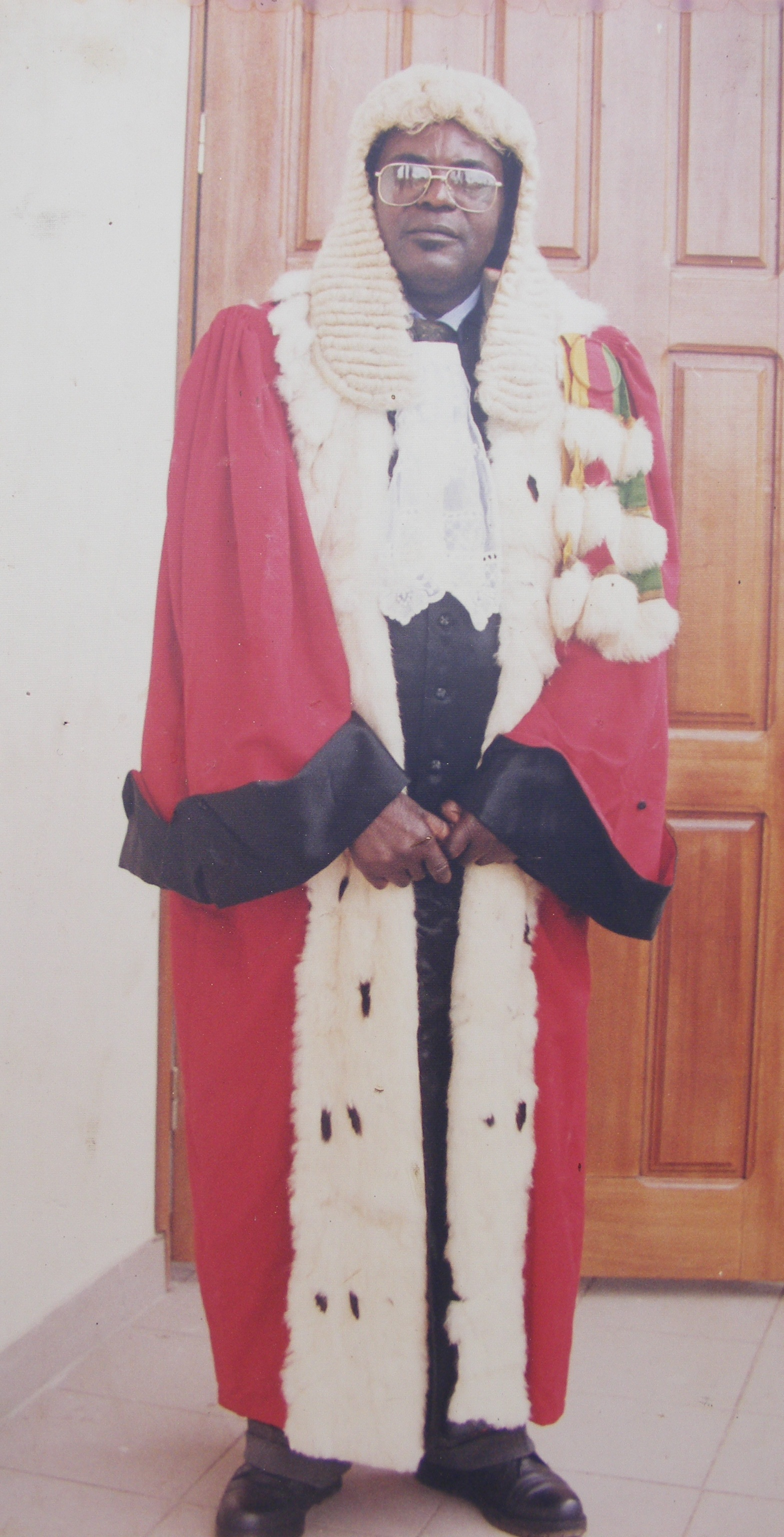

Personal details
- Born: December 15, 1949 Bai-Sombe, British Cameroon (now Cameroon)
- Died: June 7, 2009 (aged 59) Edea, Cameroon
- Spouse(s): (1) Grace Betah (2) Sarah Lobe (3) Martha Lokili (4) Susan Mpoche
- Children: Esambi Mbai; Ekwa Duala-Ekoko; Mbone Duala-Ekoko; Enene Duala-Ekoko; Ebako Duala-Ekoko; Konge Duala-Ekoko; Musume Duala-Ekoko; Emmanuel Duala-Ekoko; Ndolo Duala-Ekoko; Elijah Duala-Ekoko; Lokili Duala-Ekoko; Betty Duala-Ekoko; Miracle-Benis Duala-Ekoko
- Education: Presbyterian High School, Kumba
- Occupation: Judge

Justice Ben Duala Ekoko (December 15, 1949 – June 7, 2009) was the Attorney General of the Southwest Region (Cameroon) between 2001 and 2004, and worked as one of the Inspector Generals at the Inspectorate of Judicial services at the Ministry of Justice of Cameroon from 2004 till his death in an automobile accident on June 7, 2009.

Justice Ekoko completed his secondary school education at the Presbyterian Secondary School in Kumba, and later attended the Cameroonian School of Administration and Magistracy. Upon his graduation, he was sent to Kumba as the Deputy State Counsel. He was later transferred to Limbe, Cameroon as the President of the Court of First Instance, and later to Kumba as the President of the Court of First Instance. In 1994, he was made the President of the High Court of Kumba, and in 2000, he was transferred to Buea as the President of the High Court Fako. While in Buea, he was appointed the Attorney General of the Southwest Region.

Justice Ekoko had thirteen children, and was married to four wives during his lifetime. He was also the Chief of the Bai-Sombe clan till his death.
