= Ngute government =

Government of Cameroon since 2019

- Cabinet of Cameroon
- 2019–present
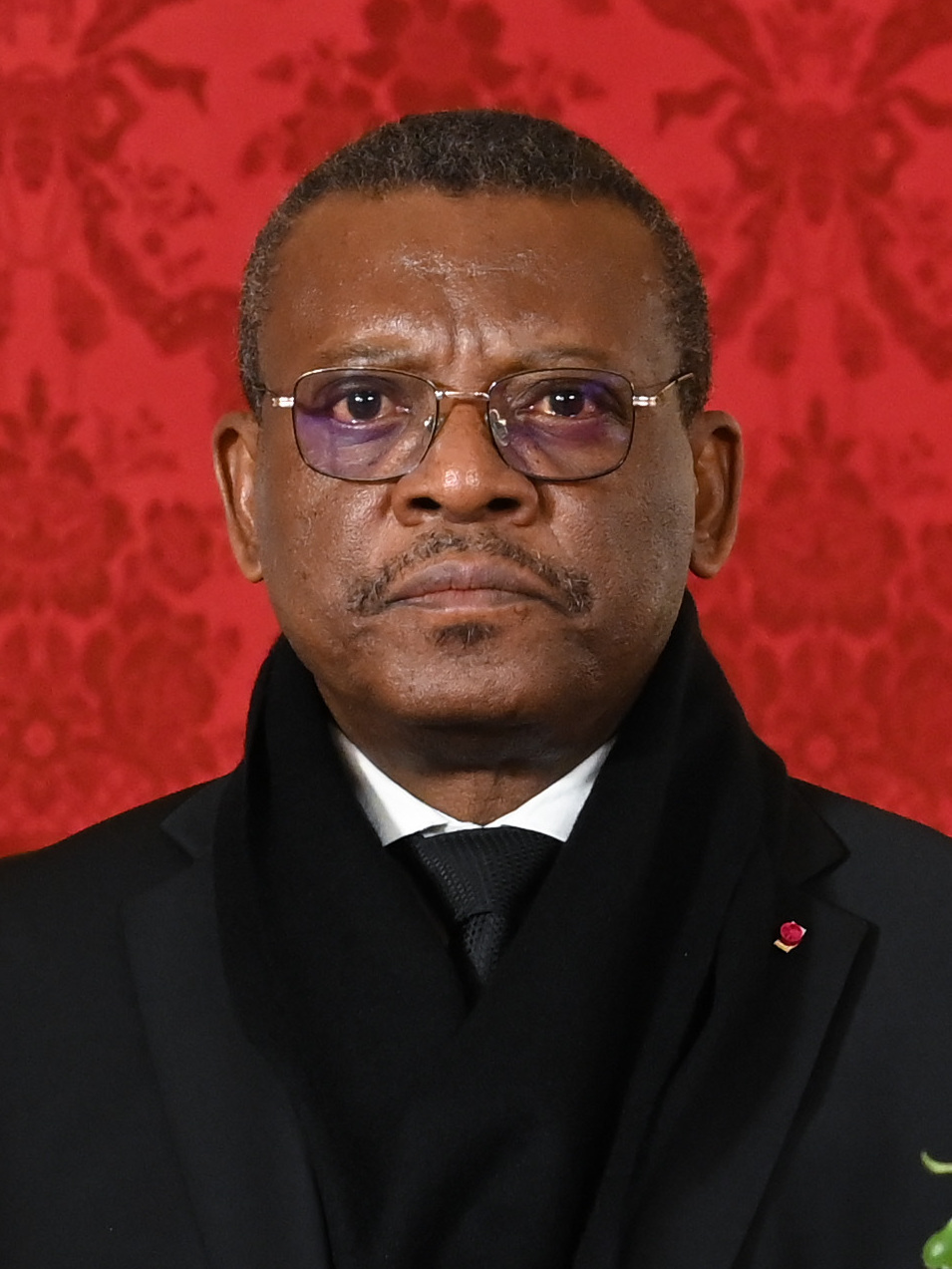
- Date formed: 4 January 2019

People and organisations
- President: Paul Biya
- Prime Minister: Joseph Ngute
- Total no. of members: 63
- Member parties: CPDM
- Status in legislature: Supermajority
- Opposition parties: UNDP (Since 2025); SDF; CPNR; UDC; FSNC (Since 2025); MDR; USM

History
- Elections: 2018 presidential election 2020 parliamentary election 2025 presidential election
- Legislature terms: 9th National Assembly; 10th National Assembly
- Predecessor: Fourth Yang Government

The Ngute government has been the cabinet of the Republic of Cameroon since 2019. It is led by Prime Minister Joseph Ngute and was initially formed by the ruling Cameroon People's Democratic Movement (CPDM) with support from the National Union for Democracy and Progress (UNDP) and the Cameroon National Salvation Front (FSNC) until 2025.

The government is composed of 63 members, including the Prime Minister, four Ministers of State, 31 Ministers, 12 Deputy Ministers, five Ministers in charge of missions, and 10 Secretaries of State. Among its members, eight are women, reflecting a measure of gender representation within the cabinet.

== Cabinet ==
=== Ministers of State ===
Portfolio	Minister	Took office	Left office	Party
Minister of State; Minister of Tourism and Leisure	Bello Bouba Maigari	4 January 2019	1 July 2025	UNDP
Minister of State; Minister of Tourism and Leisure	Gabriel Mbairobe (Acting)	1 July 2025	Incumbent	RDPC
Minister of State; Minister of Justice; Keeper of the Seals	Laurent Esso	4 January 2019	Incumbent	RDPC
Minister of State; Minister of Higher Education	Jacques Fame Ndongo	4 January 2019	Incumbent	RDPC
Secretary General of the Presidency of the Republic	Ferdinand Ngoh Ngoh	4 January 2019	Incumbent	RDPC

=== Cabinet Ministers ===
Portfolio	Minister	Took office	Left office	Party
Prime Minister	Joseph Ngute	4 January 2019	Incumbent	RDPC
Minister for Territorial Administration	Paul Atanga Nji	4 January 2019	Incumbent	RDPC
Minister of Social affairs	Pauline Irene Nguene	4 January 2019	Incumbent	RDPC
Minister of Agriculture and Rural Development	Gabriel Mbarobe	4 January 2019	Incumbent	RDPC
Minister for Arts and Culture	Pierre Ishmael Bidoung Kpwatt	4 January 2019	Incumbent	RDPC
Minister of Commerce	Luc Magloire Atangana Mbarga	4 January 2019	Incumbent	RDPC
Minister of Communication	Rene Emmanuel Sadi	4 January 2019	Incumbent	RDPC
Minister for Decentralization and Local Development	George Elanga Obam	4 January 2019	Incumbent	RDPC
Minister of Economy, Planning and Regional Development	Alamine Ousmane Mey	4 January 2019	Incumbent	RDPC
Minister of Basic Education	Laurent Etoundi Ngoa	4 January 2019	Incumbent	RDPC
Minister for Livestock, Fisheries and Animal Industries	Dr. Taïga	4 January 2019	Incumbent	RDPC
Minister for Employment and Vocational Training	Issa Tchiroma	4 January 2019	24 June 2025	FSNC
Minister for Employment and Vocational Training	Moununa Foutsou (Acting)	24 June 2025	Incumbent	RDPC
Minister for Energy and Water Resources	Gaston Eloundou Essomba	4 January 2019	Incumbent	RDPC
Minister for Environment, Nature Protection and Sustainable Development	Pierre Hélé	4 January 2019	Incumbent	RDPC
Minister of Secondary Education	Pauline Nalova Lyonga	4 January 2019	Incumbent	RDPC
Minister of Finance	Louis-Paul Motazé	4 January 2019	Incumbent	RDPC
Minister for Civil Service and Administrative Reform	Joseph Le	4 January 2019	Incumbent	RDPC
Minister for Forestry and Wildlife	Jules Doret Ndongo	4 January 2019	Incumbent	RDPC
Minister of Housing and Urban Development	Célestine Ketcha Courtès	4 January 2019	Incumbent	RDPC
Minister of Youth and Civic Education	Moununa Foutsou	4 January 2019	Incumbent	RDPC
Minister of Mines, Industry and Technological Development	Gabriel Dodo Ndoke	4 January 2019	21 January 2023	RDPC
Minister of SMEs, Social Economy and Crafts	Achilles Bassilekin III	4 January 2019	Incumbent	RDPC
Minister of Posts and Telecommunications	Minette Libom Li Likeng	4 January 2019	Incumbent	RDPC
Minister of Women Empowerment and The Family	Marie-Thérèse Abena Ondoa	4 January 2019	Incumbent	RDPC
Minister of Scientific Research and Innovation	Madeleine Tchuente	4 January 2019	Incumbent	RDPC
Minister of Foreign Affairs	Lejeune Mbella Mbella	4 January 2019	Incumbent	RDPC
Minister of Public Health	Madeleine Tchuente	4 January 2019	Incumbent	RDPC
Minister of Sports and Physical Education	Narcisse Mouelle Kombi	4 January 2019	Incumbent	RDPC
Minister of Transport	Ernest Ngalle Bibehe	4 January 2019	Incumbent	RDPC
Minister of Labor and Social Security	Grégoire Owona	4 January 2019	Incumbent	RDPC
Minister of Public Works	Emmanuel Nganou Djoumessi	4 January 2019	Incumbent	RDPC
Director of the Civil Cabinet of the Presidency of the Republic	Samuel Mvondo Ayolo	4 January 2019	Incumbent	RDPC

=== Ministers Delegate ===
Portfolio	Minister	Took office	Left office	Party
Minister Delegate to the Presidency in charge of Defense	Joseph Beti Assomo	4 January 2019	Incumbent	RDPC
Minister Delegate to the Presidency in charge of Public Procurement	Ibrahim Talba Malla	4 January 2019	Incumbent	RDPC
Minister Delegate to the Presidency responsible for relations with the Assemblies	François Wakata Bolvine	4 January 2019	Incumbent	RDPC
Minister Delegate to the Presidency in charge of Supreme State Audit	Fomudam Rose Ngwari	4 January 2019	Incumbent	RDPC
Minister Delegate to the Minister of Agriculture and Rural Development	Clémentine Ananga Messina	4 January 2019	Incumbent	RDPC
Minister Delegate to the Minister of Economy, Planning and Regional Development responsible for Planning	Paul Tasong	4 January 2019	Incumbent	RDPC
Minister Delegate to the Minister of the Environment, Nature Protection and Sustainable Development	Nana Aboubakar Djalloh	4 January 2019	Incumbent	UNDP
Minister Delegate to the Minister of Finance	Yaouba Abdoulaye	4 January 2019	Incumbent	RDPC
Minister Delegate to the Minister of Justice, Keeper of the Seals	Jean de Dieu Momo	4 January 2019	Incumbent	RDPC
Minister Delegate to the Minister for External Relations responsible for Commonwealth Relations	Félix Mbayu	4 January 2019	Incumbent	RDPC
Minister Delegate to the Minister of Foreign Affairs in charge of Relations with the Islamic World	Adoum Gargoum	4 January 2019	8 March 2021	RDPC
Minister Delegate to the Minister of Transport	Zakariaou Njoya	4 January 2019	Incumbent	RDPC
