= List of governments of Cameroon =

The following is a list of the governments of the Republic of Cameroon since its unification on May 20, 1972.

== Ahmadou Ahidjo First president of Cameroon (1960–1982) ==
=== First Government of unified Cameroon: no prime minister (1972–1975) ===
- No prime minister from 3 July 1972 to 29 June 1975 (2 years, 11 months and 26 days):
  - First Government of Unified Cameroon: Government of July 3, 1972
    - Reshuffle of 8 February 1973
    - Reshuffle of 29 December 1973
    - Rescheduling of 7 June 1974

=== Government of Paul Biya (1975–1982) ===
- Government of Paul Biya from 30 June 1975 to 6 November 1982 (7 years, 4 months and 7 days):
  - Government of Paul Biya (1) from 30 June 1975 to 6 December 1976
  - Government of Paul Biya (2) from 7 December 1977 to 1 May 1978
  - Government of Paul Biya (3) from 2 May 1978 to 6 July 1980
  - Government of Paul Biya (4) from 7 July 1980 to 22 July 1980
  - Government of Paul Biya (5) from 23 July 1980 to 10 November 1980
  - Government of Paul Biya (6) from 11 November 1980 to 3 November 1981
  - Government of Paul Biya (7) from 4 November 1981 to 16 January 1982
  - Government of Paul Biya (8) from 7 January 1982 to 5 November 1982

=== Government of Belo Bouba Maigari (1982–1983) ===
- Government of Bello Bouba Maigari from 6 November 1982 to 22 August 1983 (9 months and 16 days)
  - Government of Bello Bouba Maigari (1) from 11 June 1982 to 12 April 1983
  - Government of Bello Bouba Maigari (2) from 13 April 1983 to 17 June 1983
  - Government of Bello Bouba Maigari (3) from 18 June 1983 to 22 August 1983

=== Government of Luc Ayang (1983–1984) ===
- Government of Luc Ayang from 22 August 1983 to 25 January 1984 (5 months and 3 days)

=== No prime minister (1984–1991) ===
- No PM from 25 January 1984 to 26 April 1991 (7 years, 3 months and 1 day)
  - Government of 4 February 1984
  - Government of 7 July 1984
  - Government of 24 August 1985
  - Government of 21 November 1986
  - Government of 23 January 1987
  - Government of 4 December 1987
  - Government of 16 May 1988
  - Government of 13 April 1989
  - Government of 23 April 1989
  - Government of 7 December 1990

=== Government of Sado Hayatou (1991–1992) ===
- Government of Sadou Hayatou from 26 April 1991 to 9 April 1992 (11 months and 14 days)

=== Government of Simon Achidi Achu (1992–1996) ===
- Government of Simon Achidi Achu from 9 April 1992 to 19 September 1996: (4 years, 5 months and 10 days)
  - Government of Simon Achidi Achu (1) from 9 April 1992 to 29 August 1992
  - Government of Simon Achidi Achu (2) from 30 August 1992 to 3 September 1992
  - Government of Simon Achidi Achu (3) from 4 September 1992 to 24 November 1992
  - Government of Simon Achidi Achu (4) from 25 November 1992 to 26 November 1992
  - Government of Simon Achidi Achu (5) from 27 November 1992 to 20 July 1994
  - Government of Simon Achidi Achu (6) from 21 July 1994 to 19 September 1996

=== Government of Peter Mafany Musonge (1996–2004) ===
- Government of Peter Mafany Musonge from 19 September 1996 to 8 December 2004 (8 years, 2 months and 19 days):
  - Government of Peter Mafany Musonge (1) from 19 September 1996 to 6 December 1997
  - Government of Peter Mafany Musonge (2) from 7 December 1997 to 31 August 1999
  - Government of Peter Mafany Musonge (3) from 1 September 1999 to 17 March 2000
  - Government of Peter Mafany Musonge (4) from 18 March 2000 to 26 April 2001
  - Government of Peter Mafany Musonge (5) from 27 April 2001 to 23 August 2002
  - Government of Peter Mafany Musonge (6) from 24 August 2002 to 22 April 2004
  - Government of Peter Mafany Musonge (7) from 23 April 2004 to 8 December 2004

=== Government of Ephraim Inoni (2004–2009) ===
- Government Ephraim Inoni from December 8, 2004 to June 30, 2009 (4 years, 6 months and 22 days):
  - Government of Ephraim Inoni (1) from 8 December 2004 to 21 September 2006
  - Government of Ephraim Inoni (2) from 22 September 2006 to 6 June 2007
  - Government of Ephraim Inoni (3) from 7 September 2007 to 30 June 2009

=== Government of Philemon Yang (2009–2019) ===
- Government of Philemon Yang since 30 June 2009
  - Government of Philemon Yang (1) from 30 June 2009 to 8 December 2011
  - Government of Philemon Yang (2) from 9 December 2011 to 1 October 2015
  - Government of Philemon Yang (3) from 2 October 2015 to 1 March 2018
  - Government of Philemon Yang (4) from 2 March 2018

=== Government of Joseph Ngute (2019–) ===
- Joseph Ngute's government

== See also ==
- Prime Ministers of Cameroon
- Presidents of Cameroon
- History of Cameroon
