= Essimi Menye =

Cameroonian politician

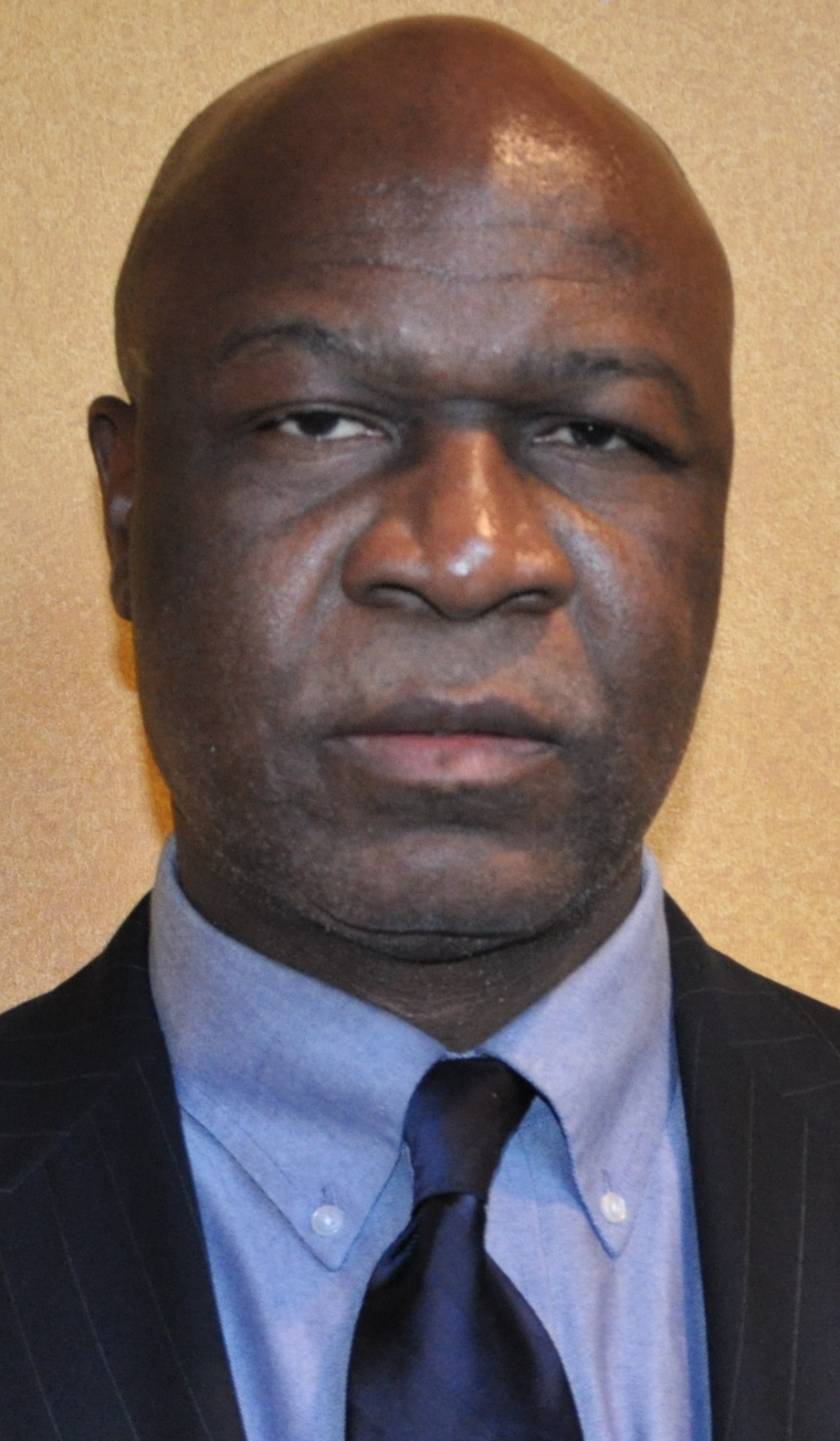
- Menye in 2010

Minister of Agriculture of Cameroon
- In office December 9, 2011 – October 1, 2015
- Preceded by: Jean Nkuete
- Succeeded by: Henri Eyebe Ayissi
- In office September 7, 2007 – December 8, 2011
- Preceded by: Polycarpe Abah Abah
- Succeeded by: Alamine Ousmane Mey

Personal details
- Born: Emmanuel Essimi Menye; 1950 (age 75–76) Mfomakap, Lekié, Cameroon
- Party: RDPC
- Education: INSEA; Paris Dauphine University; INSTN

Essimi Menye (born Emmanuel Essimi Menye, also known as Lazare Essimi Menye) is an exiled Cameroonian politician who served as Minister of Finance between 2007 and 2011 and Minister of Agriculture between 2011 and 2015. Since 2015, Menye was targeted in Operation Sparrowhawk, and the Cameroonian government accused him of embezzling public funds. He was sentenced to life imprisonment in absentia in 2019 by the Special Criminal Court.

== Early life and professional career ==
Menye was born in 1950 in Mfomakap, Lekié, Cameroon. He studied at the National Institute of Statistics and Applied Economics in Morocco, and then Paris Dauphine University where he attained a DEA in production economics. He also studied at the Institut national des sciences et techniques nucléaires where he obtained a DEA in economics.

In 1984, Menye joined the National Institute of Statistics (INS) where he carried out the census in Cameroon and collected information from industrial companies. He retired in 2005, having advanced to the head of his department within the INS. From 1990 to 1992, he was recruited by the United Nations Development Programme to be an advisor for the Rwandan Minister of Planning. He held this position again at the request of the World Bank. Menye then worked in Washington, D.C. where he worked for the World Bank as a consultant. He worked on improving the statistical systems of several African countries and the Poverty Reduction Strategy Paper in Uganda. Menye then served as an advisor to the Cameroonian administrator at the International Monetary Fund.

== Political career ==
While staying at the Hilton Hotel in Yaoundé, Menye found out that he had been appointed Minister Delegate in charge of the budget at the Ministry of Finance in the second government of Ephraïm Inoni. The document that announced his confirmation mistakenly wrote his name as Lazare Essimi Menye, which he would be incorrectly described as in the Cameroonian press and government statements.

On September 7, 2007, Menye was appointed Minister of Finance in Inoni's third government. That November during a session of the National Assembly, Menye responded to MP Roger Nkodo Dang, who accused Menye of the "slicing and dicing" of public procurement budgets, with Menye saying "Cameroon is an environment where corruption has deep roots, and an administrative text alone is not enough to eradicate it." Menye later said he wanted to fundamentally change Cameroon's relationship with money.

Menye was one of the first three signatories of the Lekie appeal, which asked Paul Biya to amend the constitution to serve another term.

Menye was reappointed as Minister of Finance in the first government of Philémon Yang, and in 2010 launched a 200 billion FCFA bond issue. In July 2011, the government opened free banking services in 15 areas, incentivizing Cameroonians to save and promote financial inclusion. Menye garnered a lot of criticism as Minister of Finance, and during a government reshuffle later that year, he was reappointed to Minister of Agriculture, effectively a demotion.

In 2015, Menye was under investigation by the Special Criminal Court for embezzling funds during his time at the ministry, and was placed on house arrest. He was ousted from the government during a government reshuffle in 2015.

== Exile ==
In April 2013, as part of Operation Sparrowhawk led by Laurent Esso, the Ministry of Justice opened a case on Menye while Menye was Minister of Agriculture, for his alleged embezzlement of funds during his time as Minister of Finance. His case was heard by the Special Criminal Court on January 13, 2015.

On October 11, 2015, a few days after his dismissal from the government, Menye suffered a stroke at his home and was taken to a hospital in Yaoundé, where he was placed in intensive care. In early November, while he was still recovering in the hospital, Jeune Afrique revealed that Menye was being guarded by gendarmes in case he tried to flee elsewhere, as other figures targeted by Operation Sparrowhawk had done. On December 1, however, Paul Biya authorized his medical evacuation to the United States.

After he recovered in the U.S., Menye returned to work at the IMF as an advisor. In 2017, Cameroonian authorities issued an arrest warrant for Menye, accusing him of complicity in the embezzlement of 1.8 billion FCFA of public funds. His extradition is a very low possibility due to limited cooperation between Yaounde and Washington. Cameroonian lawyer Clement Joel Nakong said that Menye's warrant was invalid in the United States as Cameroonian courts can't issue international arrest warrants.

In 2019, the Special Criminal Court found Menye guilty, and sentenced him to life imprisonment in absentia.

== Personal life ==
Menye is married and the father of four children. Since fleeing to the U.S. in 2015, he lives in Virginia.

Although he lives in exile abroad, Menye still operates 400 hectares of farmland in Cameroon, where he grows oil palms, plantains, and cocoa trees.
