= Jacques Fame Ndongo =

Cameroonian academic and politician (born 1950)

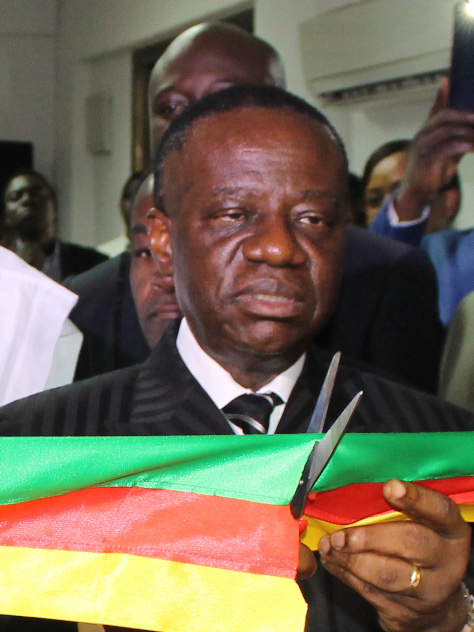
- Ndongo in 2014

Minister of State Minister of Higher Education
- Incumbent
- Assumed office 9 December 2004
- Prime Minister: Ephraïm Inoni; Philémon Yang; Joseph Ngute
- Preceded by: Maurice Tchuente

Minister of Communication
- In office 18 March 2000 – 9 December 2004
- Prime Minister: Peter Mafany Musonge
- Preceded by: René Zé Nguelé
- Succeeded by: Pierre Moukoko Mbonjo

Rector of the University of Yaoundé I
- In office 30 October 1998 – 18 March 2000
- Preceded by: Jean Messi
- Succeeded by: Jean Tabi Manga

Personal details
- Born: 15 November 1950 (age 75) Nkolandom, French Cameroon
- Party: CPDM
- Education: University of Yaoundé (BA); University of Lille (PhD)

Jacques Fame Ndongo (born 15 November 1950) is a Cameroonian academic and politician who has served as Minister of Higher Education since 2004. A member of the Cameroon People's Democratic Movement, he previously served as Minister of Communication from 2000 to 2004.

== Career ==
He was born in Nkolandom, South Region. He began his career in 1972 in the written press as head of the national section at the Cameroon Press Agency. From 1974 to 1978, he became coordinator of the French editorial team at the Cameroon Tribune. He began his academic career in 1978 as a lecturer at the University of Yaoundé until 1980, then became a lecturer for the next eight years. From 1981 to 1993, he held the position of deputy director of the École Supérieure des Sciences et Techniques de l'Information et de la Communication.

He became a lecturer in 1988, then a full professor at Cameroonian universities in 1992. In 1998, he was appointed Rector of the University of Yaoundé I, a position he held from 30 October 1998 to March 2000.

== Education ==
After obtaining a baccalaureate (literature stream) in 1969 from the Collège F.X. Vogt, he continued his studies at the École Supérieure de Journalisme de Lille in June 1972. In 1973, he earned a bachelor's degree in literature and a postgraduate diploma in African literature from the University of Yaoundé I. In 1978, he defended his doctoral thesis. He received his doctorate in semiotics from the University of Lille in 1984. Since 1992, he has been a professor of literature and semiotics.
