= Martin Aristide Okouda =

Cameroonian politician (1951–2021)

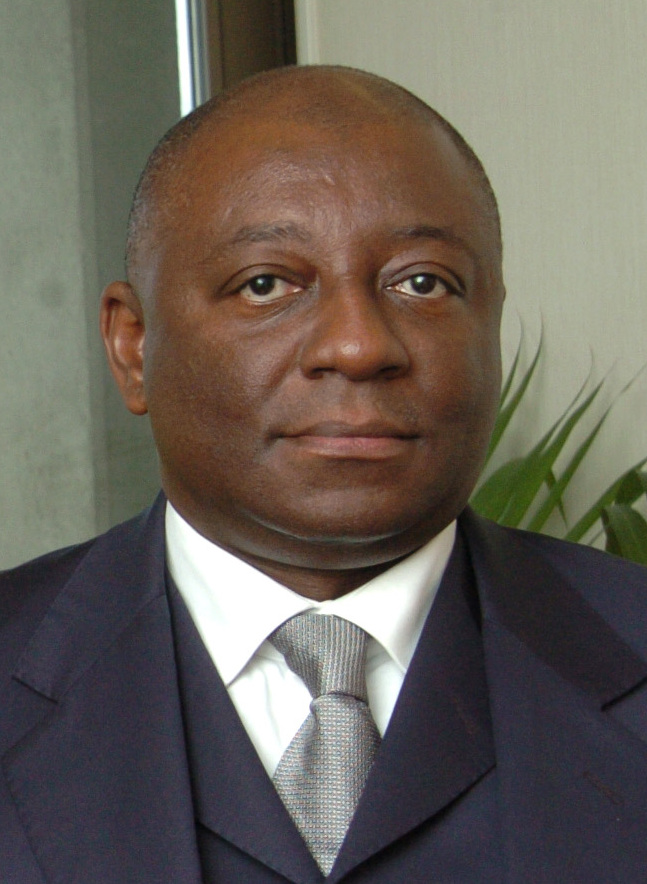
- Martin Aristide Okouda in 2004

Minister of Economy, Planning and Regional Development
- In office 18 March 2000 – 8 December 2004

Minister of Public Works
- In office 8 December 2004 – ?

Personal details
- Born: Martin Aristide Léopold Okouda; 6 September 1951 Yaoundé, French Cameroon
- Died: 9 April 2021 (aged 69) Paris, France
- Party: CPDM

Martin Aristide Okouda (6 September 1951 – 9 April 2021) was a Cameroonian politician who held various ministerial roles.

== Biography ==
Okouda finished his secondary schooling at the Lycée Général-Leclerc in 1969. He graduated with a degree in economics from the Sorbonne and also earned diplomas from the IAE Paris and Sciences Po.

From 1977 to 1979, Okouda was a trainee at the Banque Worms. In 1980, he returned to Cameroon and served as Deputy Chairman of the Business Control Department at the Directorate of Industry from 1981 to 1982. He was then Deputy Director of External Financing at the Directorate of Programming from 1982 to 1983 and Deputy Director of Economic and Technical Cooperation and cumulatively Deputy Director of International and Multilateral Cooperation at the Ministry of Planning and Territorial Development from 1983 to 1987.

On 6 March 1987, he was appointed to the Cabinet of President Paul Biya. Subsequently, on 31 July 1991, he was appointed Special Advisor to Prime Minister Sadou Hayatou. On 18 March 2000, he became Minister of Economy, Planning and Regional Development, serving until 8 December 2004, when he became Minister of Public Works. During this period, he also served as Chairman of the Council of Ministers of the Chairman of the Council of Ministers of the (CEMAC). In 2012, he replaced Antoine Ntsimi as Executive Secretary of CEMAC.

Okouda was a member of the Executive Committee of the Cameroon People's Democratic Movement, the country's ruling party. He then served on the board of directors of the Société Commerciale de Banque Cameroun, owned by Attijariwafa Bank, as well as the board of directors of the Agence de Régulation du Secteur de l’Électricité.

Martin Aristide Okouda died in Paris on 9 April 2021 at the age of 69.
