= Alamine Ousmane Mey =

Cameroonian businessman and politician (born 1966)

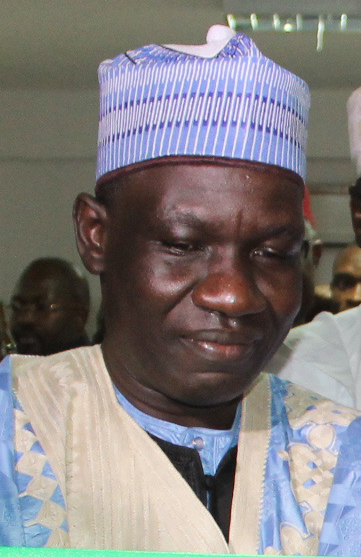
- Mey in 2014

Minister of Economy, Planning and Regional Development
- Incumbent
- Assumed office 2 March 2018
- Prime Minister: Philémon Yang; Joseph Ngute
- Preceded by: Louis-Paul Motazé

Minister of Finance
- In office 9 December 2011 – 2 March 2018
- Prime Minister: Philémon Yang
- Preceded by: Essimi Menye
- Succeeded by: Louis-Paul Motazé

Personal details
- Born: 26 February 1966 (age 60) Kousseri, Far North Region, Cameroon
- Party: CPDM
- Education: RWTH Aachen University

Alamine Ousmane Mey (born 26 February 1966) is a Cameroonian businessman and politician who served as Minister of Finance from 2011 and 2018. Since 2018, Mey has been the Minister of the Economy, Planning, and Regional Development.

== Biography ==
Mey was born on 26 February 1966, in Kousséri, Cameroon. He completed his primary schooling in Garoua. He is the son of former Northern Province governor Abba Ousmane Mey, a top-ranking figure in the Ahmadou Ahidjo government. Mey studied electrical engineering in Germany at RWTH Aachen University, as well as in Belgium and Turkey. In 1993, he joined CCEI Bank, which would later become Afriland First Bank, and was promoted to managing director in 2003. In 2004, Mey spearheaded the launch of I-CARD, the first electronic wallet in Central Africa. I-Card was not an initially popular measure.

On 9 December 2011, Mey was appointed Minister of Finance. Under him, Cameroon's economy grew by more than 5% despite the Great Recession. The website for the Cameroonian Ministry of Finance was also launched under Mey. Mey is a supporter of microfinance in Cameroon, and closed down 84 illegal microfinance loan businesses in the country in February 2014.

In 2018, Mey was appointed Minister of Economy, Planning and Regional Development. Mey's goal upon entering office was to increase public-private partnerships.
