= Pierre Hélé =

Cameroonian politician (born 1946)

Minister for Environment, Nature Protection and Sustainable Development
- Incumbent
- Assumed office 8 December 2004
- Prime Minister: Ephraïm Inoni; Philémon Yang; Joseph Ngute
- Preceded by: Tanyi-Mbianyor Clarkson Oben

Minister of Tourism
- In office 18 March 2000 – 8 December 2004
- Prime Minister: Peter Mafany Musonge
- Preceded by: Claude Joseph Mbafou
- Succeeded by: Baba Amadou

Minister of Housing and Urban Development
- In office 7 December 1997 – 18 March 2000
- Prime Minister: Peter Mafany Musonge
- Succeeded by: Boubakary Yerima Halilou

Personal details
- Born: 1946 (age 79–80) Kaélé, French Cameroon
- Party: CPDM

Pierre Hélé (born 1946) is a Cameroonian politician, currently serving in the government of Cameroon as Minister of the Environment and the Protection of Nature. He was a member of the government from 1979 to 1984 and has again served in the government since 1997.

== Political career ==
A member of the Mundang ethnic group, Hélé is a Catholic from the Far North Province of Cameroon and was born in Lara. He was head of the Personnel Department at the Ministry of Equipment, Housing, and Domains from 1974 to 1975 and Deputy Account Director at the Ministry of Finance from 1975 to 1977. Subsequently, he was a research officer at the Bank of Central African States from 1977 to 1979 and was appointed to the government as Deputy Minister of Finance in November 1979. Hélé was promoted to the position of Minister of National Education on 4 February 1984, but following the April 1984 coup attempt against President Paul Biya, he was dismissed from the government on 7 July 1984. He then took an administrative post at the University of Yaoundé.

Hélé returned to politics in the early 1990s, becoming a member of the National Union for Democracy and Progress (UNDP), an opposition party prominent in the north and led by Maigari Bello Bouba. He was included on the UNDP Central Committee, and at the time of the 1992 elections he worked to persuade the Mundang to vote for the UNDP. He later joined the government along with UNDP President Bello Bouba on 7 December 1997, becoming Minister of Urban Planning and Housing. Subsequently, he was moved to the post of Minister of Tourism on 18 March 2000.

Hélé left the UNDP in May 2002 and joined the Cameroon People's Democratic Movement (CPDM), complaining that Bello Bouba was mismanaging the party. He remained a member of the government and was moved to the position of Minister of the Environment and the Protection of Nature on 8 December 2004.

Explaining his ministry's 2008 draft budget—which had increased from the previous year's budget—in the National Assembly on 27 November 2007, Hélé said that he intended to pursue measures that would deter environmental harm through fines and taxes and increase pollution control in the cities. He also said that the ministry planned to establish "a climate change watchdog".
