= Luc Magloire Atangana Mbarga =

Cameroonian lawyer and politician (born 1954)

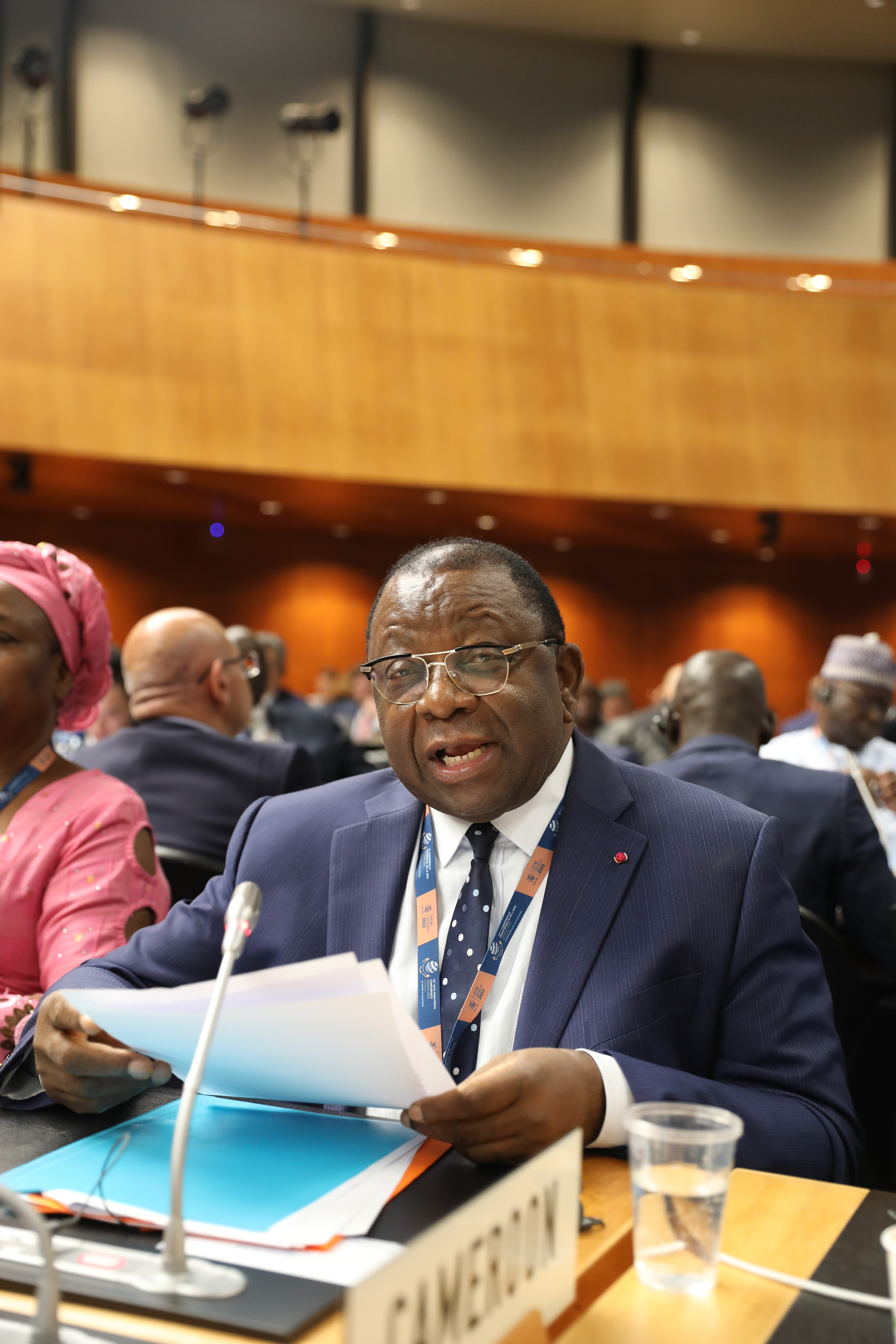
- Atangana Mbarga in 2022

Minister of Commerce
- Incumbent
- Assumed office 8 December 2004
- Prime Minister: Ephraïm Inoni; Philémon Yang; Joseph Ngute
- Preceded by: Office established

Personal details
- Born: 8 August 1954 (age 72) Nsazomo, French Cameroon
- Party: CPDM
- Education: Université Paris-Dauphine

Luc-Magloire Mbarga Atangana (born 1954) is a Cameroonian lawyer and politician who has served as Minister of Commerce since 2004. A member of the Cameroon People's Democratic Movement, he previously worked in the banking sector.

== Biography ==
Luc Magloire Atangana Mbarga was born on 8 July 1954 in Nsazomo, in the Mefou-et-Afamba department, Centre Region. He attended the Middle Seminary of Mvolyé in Yaoundé from 1972 to 1973, where he obtained a Baccalaureate A2. He subsequently studied at the Faculty of Law and Economic Sciences of the University of Yaoundé, obtaining a licenciate degree in law and economic sciences in 1977.

He later pursued postgraduate studies in France. In 1983–1984, he obtained a Diplôme d'études supérieures spécialisées (DESS) in International, Maritime and Air Transport at Paris 1 Panthéon-Sorbonne University. In 1987–1988, he obtained a DESS in Public Enterprise Law from Paris-Dauphine University and Paris-Sud University.

Between November 1977 and June 1981, Atangana Mbarga worked at the National Social Insurance Fund (CNPS), where he successively served as deputy head of the administrative department, head of the studies department, and an attaché to the director-general. From 1981, he worked in the banking sector and, between February 1983 and February 1991, he was first delegate for Europe and North Africa of the Organisation Camerounaise de la Banque (OCB), based in Paris.

Atangana Mbarga was appointed Minister of Trade on 8 December 2004. He has remained in the position through successive governments under President Paul Biya.

== Sources ==
- Portail du gouvernement camerounais
