= Gabriel Dodo Ndoke =

Cameronian auditor and politician (1971–2023)

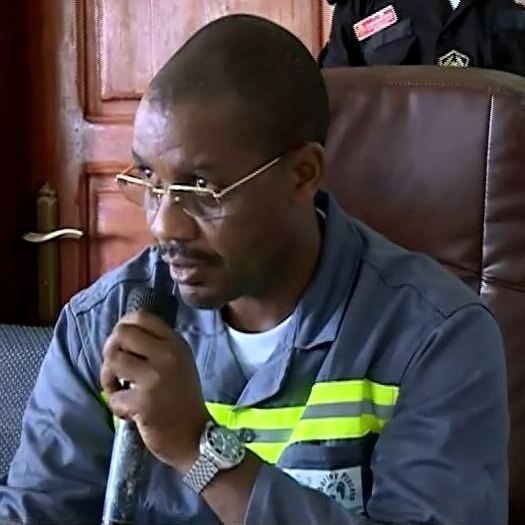
- Dodo in 2019

Minister of Mines, Industries and Technological Development
- In office 4 January 2019 – 21 January 2023
- Prime Minister: Joseph Ngute
- Preceded by: Ernest Ngwaboubou
- Succeeded by: Fuh Calistus Gentry (acting)

Personal details
- Born: 13 November 1971 Mokolo, Mbang, Kadey, Cameroon
- Died: 21 January 2023 (aged 51) Yaoundé, Cameroon
- Party: CPDM
- Education: National School of Administration and Magistracy; University of Douala; University of Yaoundé II; Institut national de la jeunesse et des sports
- Occupation: Tax auditor

Gabriel Dodo Ndoke (13 November 1971 – 21 January 2023) was a Cameroonian tax auditor and politician of the Cameroon People's Democratic Movement. He served as Minister of Mines, Industries and Technological Development from 2019 to 2023.

== Biography ==
Dodo was born in Mokolo on 13 November 1971. In 1997, he graduated from the Francophone University of Yaoundé II and earned a master's degree in private law from the same university three years later. He then attended the National School of Administration and Magistracy and the University of Douala. After his marriage, he became the father of seven children.

Dodo became a government official in 2002 as a tax auditor in the East Region. He then held several other positions in the public administration. From 2003 to 2005, he headed the tax office in Bertoua and later head of a divisional tax service in Douala from 2005 to 2007. In 2011, he was appointed Deputy Director of Budget, Equipment and Maintenance at the Ministry of Public Service and Administrative Reform.

On 4 January 2019, Dodo was appointed Minister of Mines, Industries and Technological Development in Joseph Ngute's government. On 8 December 2022, he was elected chairman of the board of directors of the Organisation Africaine de la Propriété Intellectuelle.

== Death ==
Dodo Ndoke died in Yaoundé on 21 January 2023, at the age of 51.
