= Minette Libom Li Likeng =

Cameroonian economist and politician (born 1959)

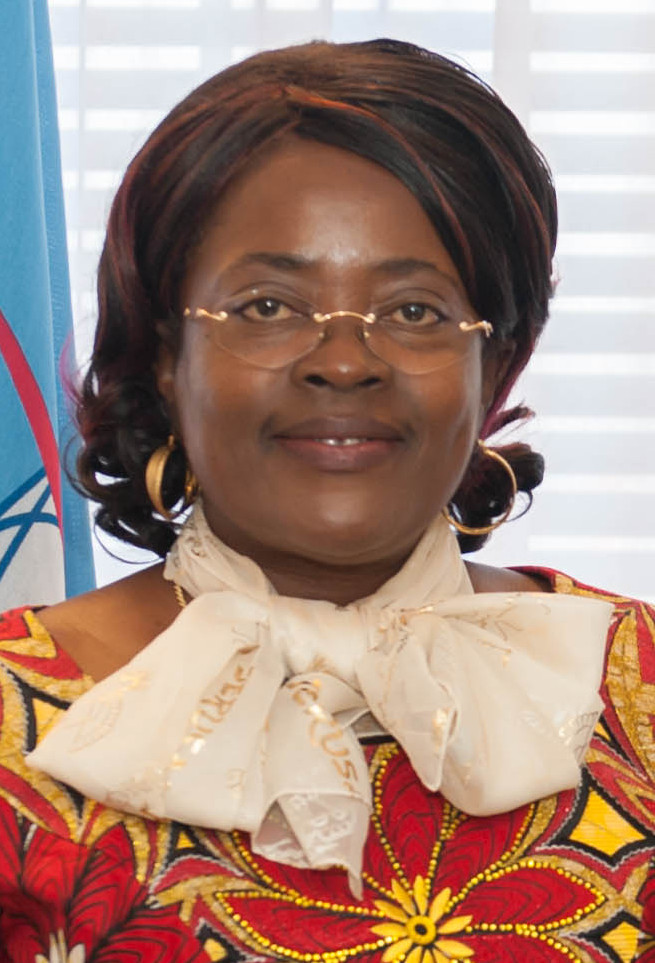
- Li Likeng in 2015

Minister of Posts and Telecommunications
- Incumbent
- Assumed office 2 October 2015
- Prime Minister: Philémon Yang; Joseph Ngute
- Preceded by: Jean Pierre Biyiti Bi Essam

Director General of Customs
- In office 2008–2015

Personal details
- Born: 4 March 1959 (age 67) Mvengue, French Cameroon
- Party: CPDM
- Education: University of Yaoundé I National School of Administration and Magistracy

Minette Libom Li Likeng (formerly Minette Mendomo) is a Cameroonian economist and politician who has served as Minister of Posts and Telecommunications since the ministerial reshuffle on October 2, 2015, in the government of Philémon Yang and later in the government of Joseph Ngute.

== Biography ==
=== Youth and studies ===
She was born on March 4, 1959, in Mveng (Esse), a locality in the Center region of Cameroon.

She completed her primary education in her hometown. In 1976, she obtained the first cycle studies certificate (BEPC), followed by the scientific probationary (Series D) in 1978 and the baccalaureate series D the following year, in 1979. She then moved to the Cameroonian capital, Yaoundé, to pursue her university studies at the University of Yaoundé I, where she obtained a degree in economics, with a major in analytics and economic policies in 1982. In 1984, she earned the diploma of inspector of financial management (customs option) from the National School of Administration and Magistracy (ENAM).

=== Activities ===
She began her professional career in 1984 as a visiting inspector at the main office of Yaoundé central station. Four years later, in 1988, she relocated from the political capital city to the economic capital city, Douala, where she served as head of IT liaison service for the customs sector in the Littoral region. In 1992, she worked in studies at the general secretariat of the Ministry of Finance. By 1995, she became a verification inspector in the central sector of the political capital. Concurrently, in 1997, she became a temporary teacher at the National School of Administration and Magistracy. In 2002, she was promoted to head of the legislation and litigation division at the Customs Directorate. Later in 2004, she assumed the position of head of the legislation and international cooperation division at the Customs Directorate, in addition to serving as a relay to the customs director and handling all interim cases. From 2004 to 2007, she fulfilled the specific function of relaying to the Director General of Customs and handling all interim cases. Eventually, she held the position of Director General of Customs from 2008 to 2015.

== Politics ==
This section requires more information.

She is a member of the Democratic Rally of the Cameroonian People (RDPC), the ruling party.

== Distinctions ==
She has received three distinctions in Cameroon from the United Nations' Millennium Development Goals (MDGs) program.

1988: MDG diploma (Best agent) 2002: MDG diploma (Best agent) in professional ethics 2005: WCO medal for significant actions to promote customs worldwide.
