= Louis-Paul Motazé =

Cameroonian politician (born 1959)

Minister of Finance
- Incumbent
- Assumed office 2 March 2018
- Prime Minister: Philémon Yang; Joseph Ngute
- Preceded by: Alamine Ousmane Mey

Minister of the Economy, Planning and Regional Development
- In office 2 October 2015 – 2 March 2018
- Prime Minister: Philémon Yang
- Preceded by: Emmanuel Nganou Djoumessi
- Succeeded by: Alamine Ousmane Mey
- In office 7 September 2007 – 8 December 2011
- Prime Minister: Ephraïm Inoni; Philémon Yang
- Succeeded by: Emmanuel Nganou Djoumessi

Secretary-General of the Prime Minister's Office
- In office 9 December 2011 – 1 October 2015
- Prime Minister: Philémon Yang

Personal details
- Born: 31 January 1959 (age 67) Bengbis, French Cameroon
- Party: CPDM
- Occupation: Politician

Louis-Paul Motazé (born 31 January 1959) is a Cameroonian politician who has served as Minister of Finance since 2018. A member of the Cameroon People's Democratic Movement, he previously served as Minister of the Economy from 2007 to 2011 and from 2015 to 2018, and as Secretary-General of the Office of the Prime Minister of Cameroon from 2011 to 2015.

== Early life and education ==
Motazé was born in Bengbis, located in the Dja and Lobo Division of Cameroon's South Region; his parents were Arnold Motazé and Mary Monengono. He obtained his secondary education in Sangmelima and then studied at the University of Yaoundé as well as Cameroon's National School of Administration and Magistracy. Subsequently, he continued his studies in France, where he received a degree in international transport in 1985. After working at the Economic Affairs Division of the Presidency of Cameroon, he worked at Cameroon Shipping Lines from 1984 to 1989 and was the company's Commercial Sub-Director.

On September 4, 2021, the health of Louis Paul Motaze deteriorated. Louis Paul Motaze was then hospitalized at the VIP Pavilion of the Central Hospital of Yaoundé and placed under respiratory assistance is evacuated to Europe.

== Career in the private sector ==
Motazé held important posts at Cameroon Airlines from 1989 to 1999: he was its Commercial Director from 1989 to 1993, its Director of the Audit and Management Control from 1993 to 1998, and he was Technical Adviser to the Directorate-General from 1998 to 1999.

== Career in the public sector ==
In 1999, Motazée became Director-General of the National Social Insurance Fund (Caisse nationale de prévoyance sociale, CNPS) in September 1999. After eight years as Director-General of the CNPS, he was appointed as Minister of the Economy, Planning, and Regional Development on 7 September 2007. He continued to occupy his post as Director-General of the CNPS until Alain Olivier Noël Mekulu Mvondo was appointed to replace him in that capacity on 7 April 2008.

After four years as Minister of the Economy, Motazé was instead appointed as Secretary-General of the Prime Minister's Office on 9 December 2011. He was moved back to his old post of Minister of the Economy, Planning, and Spatial Planning on 2 October 2015.

== Other activities ==
- International Monetary Fund (IMF), Ex-Officio Member of the Board of Governors (since 2018)
