= Yap Abdou =

President of the Audit Chamber of the Supreme Court
- In office August 11, 2020 – October 2, 2025
- Preceded by: Marc Ateba Ombala

Personal details
- Born: November 15, 1956 Foumban, Noun Department, West Region, Cameroon
- Died: October 2025 (aged 68) Douala, Cameroon
- Education: National School of Administration and Magistracy (Cameroon)

Yap Abdou (November 15, 1956 – October 2025) was a Cameroonian judge who served as the Presiding Judge of the Chamber of Accounts of the Supreme Court of Cameroon from 2020 until his death.

== Biography ==
Abdou was born in Foumban, Noun Department, West Region, Cameroon on November 15, 1956.

He graduated from the National School of Administration and Magistracy (ENAM) in 1985. Abdou began his career as a deputy public prosecutor at the court in Lekié. Afterwards, he held positions as president of the courts in Dja-et-Lobo and Sangmélima, the first prosecutor in Mfou, and President of the High Court of Yaoundé.

In 2012, Abdou was appointed president of the Special Criminal Court and in 2017 first advocate general at the Attorney General's office. In 2016, Abdou conspired with Minister of Justice Laurent Esso to forge evidence that convicted former Cameroonian investor Yves Michel Fotso. In 2019, he signed the search warrant that led to Maurice Kamto's arrest. On August 11, 2020, he was appointed president of the Audit Chamber of the Supreme Court, one of three chambers of Cameroon's supreme court. In April 2025, Abdou was appointed the 1st vice-president of the Association of Supreme Audit Institutions in Francophone Countries.

Abdou was found dead in his home on October 2, 2025, having suffered a heart attack.
