= National School of Administration and Magistracy =

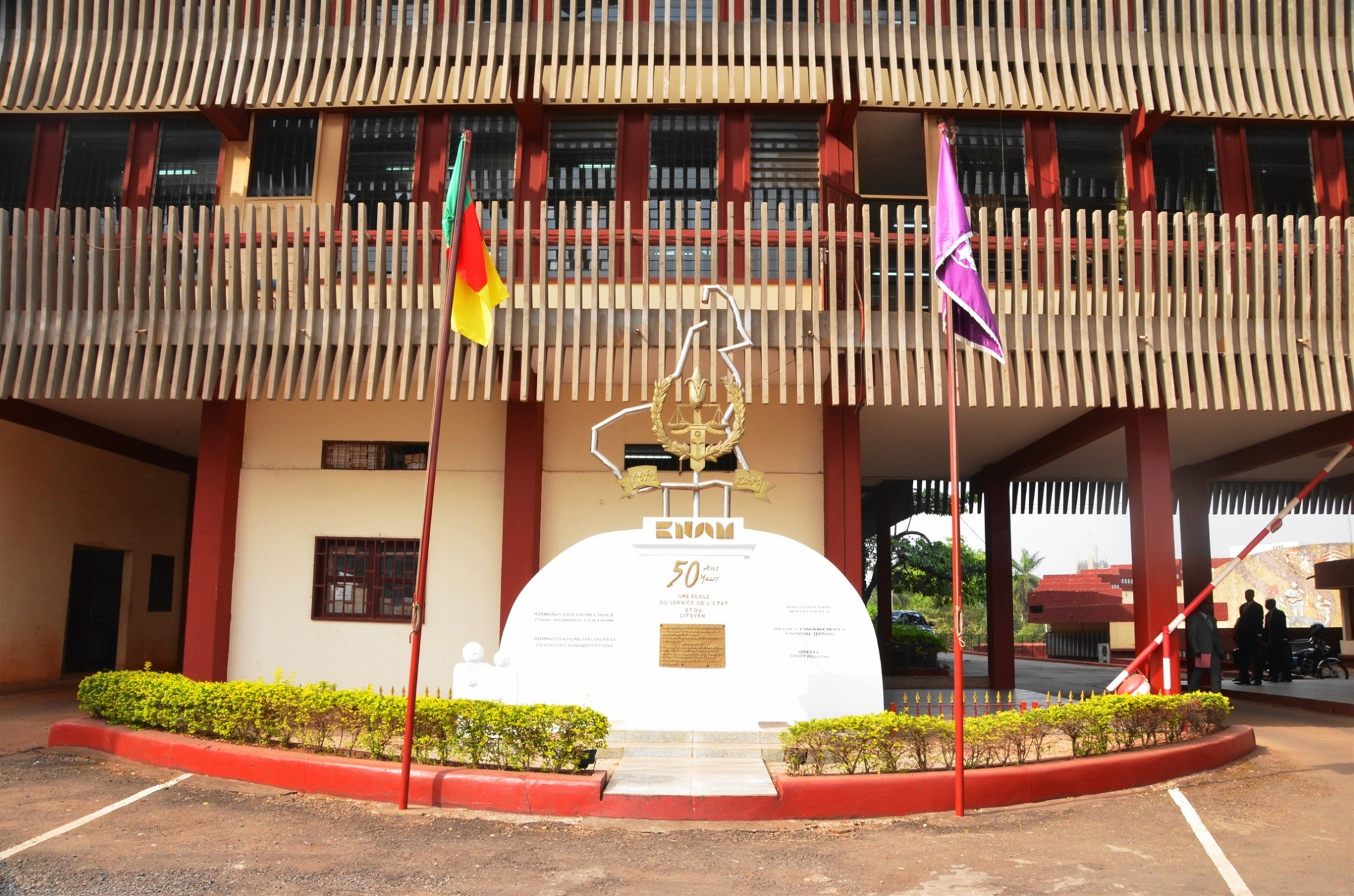

National School of Administration and Magistracy (ENAM)

National School of Administration and Magistracy (ENAM) Cameroon, established in Yaounde in 1959, is a large school of higher education whose main mission is the training and development of high officials of the Cameroonian government. It is a public institution with a public personality and financial autonomy. It is under the technical supervision of the Ministry of Public Service and Administrative Reform.

== History ==
The original name at creation is the Cameroon School of Administration (ECA). This school is the main crucible of administrators of the Cameroonian civil service since the independence of Cameroon on May 1, 1960. In 1961, the school opens a special cycle to prepare for the entrance examination to the normal cycles of candidates from the under-educated regions. Cameroon has two official national languages since independence and reunification. As a result, in 1963, a preparatory cycle for the entrance examination to Cycle A and B for English-speaking candidates were launched. The major change came in 1964: The Cameroon School of Administration (ECA) became the Normal School of Administration and Magistracy (ENAM). The main mission also changed. It is now necessary to train the civil and financial personnel of the State, as well as the magistrates of the judiciary. In 1985, ENAM became part of the National Center for Administration and Magistracy (CENAM) with the Higher Institute of Public Management (ISMP) and the Institute of Administrative and Financial Techniques (ITAF). 1995 marks the reopening of cycles A and B for the training of civil and financial service personnel. This year also marks the creation of the Research and Documentation Center for administrative problems. 2010 marks the opening of admission to the Judicial Division to graduates of Computer Science and Economics of Higher Education. Since 2012, graduates in computer science and economics of higher education compete for admission to the Division of the Judiciary and Transplants.

== Teaching ==
=== Initial training on competition ===
==== Entrance examinations ====
The decrees of the Minister of Public Service and Administrative Reform, opening the competition, set the uniform conditions for all candidates. The number of eligible places is prorated according to the requests of administrations. The competitions take place in the unique center of Yaounde. Access modes in the first year are identical for the competition internally and externally.

- For the internal competition, only public servants aged 45 and over with at least 5 years of professional seniority may compete for the B cycle. They must submit an authorization provided by the Ministry of Public Service. and administrative reform.
- For the external competition, candidates must have a Baccalaureate or Advance Level (A/L) certificates for Cycle B and be at least 32 years old at the time of the competition. For Cycle A, candidates must have a bachelor's degree or other equivalent degree. The master's degree in law is required for the auditors of justice.

The exam period is between April and June. The exam fees are unique and amount to 15,000 FCFA. The duration of the training depends on the cycle chosen. It consists of two years of training for cycles A and clerk and one year of training for cycle B. The competition is held at the unique center which is the political capital Yaoundé. The subjects on which we compete are the following:

Cycle	Contents
Administration and Financial Services Division	General knowledge, Economics, Public Law, language, Orals
Court Registrars and Magistrates	General knowledge, Judicial Organization, Civil or Criminal Procedure, language, Orals

==== Curriculum ====
ENAM provides its students with a two-year continuing education program. According to the divisions the teachings are as follows:

- Administrative Division: The sections are as follows: - General Administration - Prices, Weights and Measures - Labor Administration - Hospital Administration.
- Financial Regulatory Division: The sections are as follows: Customs - Taxes - Treasury - Accounting Matter.
- Judicial Division: The sections are as follows: Magistracy – Court Registrar.
- Language and New Technologies Division of Information and Communication: Here we have two cells: Linguistics - ICT.

==== Opportunities ====
ENAM students are integrated directly into the civil service and become public servants. They are classified as A1 for those in Cycle B and A2 for those in Cycle A.

== Controversies ==
The entry examination to ENAM is generally tainted with controversies that challenge the objective and transparent character of eligibility.

In 2004, eighty-eight (88) candidates in the ENAM competition received a three-year suspension, all examinations in all university courses for "fraud" and "attempted fraud".

In February 2006, Benjamin Amama Amam, then Minister of Public Service and Vocational Training, ordered the cancellation of the ENAM results competitions for the 2005-2006 session, following a January 2006 report denounces exam fraud. He later reversed his decision by order of Jules Doret Ndongo, then Secretary General of the Prime Minister's Office.

In October 2009, Dr. Shanda Tomne, then Chairperson of the Independent Commission Against Corruption and Discrimination (COMICODI), sends a letter of denunciation of the results of the first-year entrance examination of the Judicial Division, Judicial Section, to the Director General of ENAM.

In 2012, Prime Minister Philemon Yang instructed the Director General of ENAM, Linus Toussaint Mendjana, the exclusion of six students who were admitted on the sole instruction of the Speaker of the National Assembly Cavaye Yeguié Djibril, and not by competition.

== Famous alumni ==
=== Ministers ===
Members of the current Government
Henri Eyebe Ayissi; Jules Doret Ndongo; Issa Koumpa; Emmanuel Nganou Djoumessi; Patrice Amba Salla; Bello Bouba Maigari	Saouda Doucara; Benoît Ndong Soumhet; Ngole Philip Gwesse; Amadou Ali; Joseph Beti Assomo; Aba Sadou; Jerôme Dooh; Pauline Nalova Lyonga	Koulsoumi Alhadji épouse Boukar; Louis-Paul Motaze; Laurent Esso; Adoum Gargoum; Titi Pierre; Pierre Hele; Hamadou Moustapha
