= Ferdinand Ngoh Ngoh =

Cameroonian politician and diplomat (born 1961)

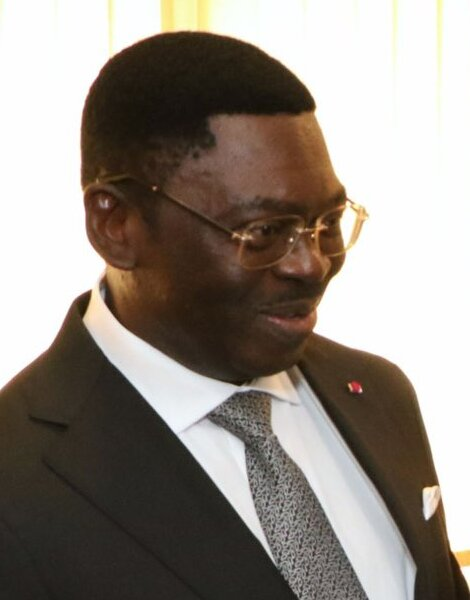
- Ngoh in 2024

Secretary-General to the Presidency of the Republic
- Incumbent
- Assumed office 9 December 2011
- President: Paul Biya
- Prime Minister: Philémon Yang; Joseph Ngute
- Preceded by: Laurent Esso

Secretary-General to the Minister of Foreign Affairs
- In office 31 August 2010 – 9 December 2011
- Prime Minister: Philémon Yang
- Preceded by: Jean-Marie Atangana Mebara

Personal details
- Born: 13 March 1961 (age 65) Minta, Haute-Sanaga, Cameroon
- Party: CPDM

Ferdinand Ngoh Ngoh (born 13 March 1961) is a Cameroonian diplomat and politician who has served as Secretary-General of the Presidency of Cameroon since 6 December 2011. He previously served as Secretary-General of the Ministry of Foreign Affairs from 2010 to 2011 and as a diplomat at the country's Permanent Mission to the United Nations in New York. He was appointed a Minister of State in January 2019. He is described as the "Shadow President" of Cameroon and with it as the de facto leader of the country, and as de facto Vice President of Cameroon.

== Biography ==
Ngoh Ngoh was born on 13 March 1961 in Minta, in the Haute-Sanaga department of the Centre Region. Ngoh Ngoh briefly worked in the civil cabinet of the Presidency of Cameroon from 1997 to 1998. From 2002 to 2006, he served as Cameroon’s first counsellor at its Permanent Mission to the United Nations in New York.

On 31 August 2010, he was appointed Secretary-General of the Ministry of Foreign Affairs. He held the position until December 2011, when he was appointed Secretary-General of the Presidency of the Republic by President Paul Biya. In this role, Ngoh was considered a close confidant of Biya and a powerful politician.

As Secretary-General of the Presidency, Ngoh Ngoh has coordinated administrative and policy matters within the presidency and acts on behalf of the head of state in official engagements. Among his diplomatic activities in this capacity was a meeting with Japanese Vice-Minister of Foreign Affairs Toshiko Abe in Yaoundé on 14 August 2013 concerning bilateral cooperation between Cameroon and Japan.

Ngoh Ngoh was appointed Minister of State on 4 January 2019 while retaining his position as Secretary-General of the Presidency, an honor heavily influenced by Chantal Biya. Around this time, Ngoh was considered by Cameroonian analysts to be the de facto President instead of Biya, with Ngoh having control over all political affairs.

On the night between August 10–11, 2018, Ngoh Ngoh's residence in Yaoundé was attacked by armed robbers. Security personnel responding to the incident killed two of the attackers.

In 2022, Ngoh Ngoh was questioned by investigators in connection with allegations concerning the management of public funds allocated to Cameroon's response to the COVID-19 pandemic. The investigation, commonly referred to as the "Covidgate" affair in Cameroonian media, concerned alleged financial irregularities involving several government departments.
