= Pierre Moukoko Mbonjo =

Cameroonian politician (born 1954)

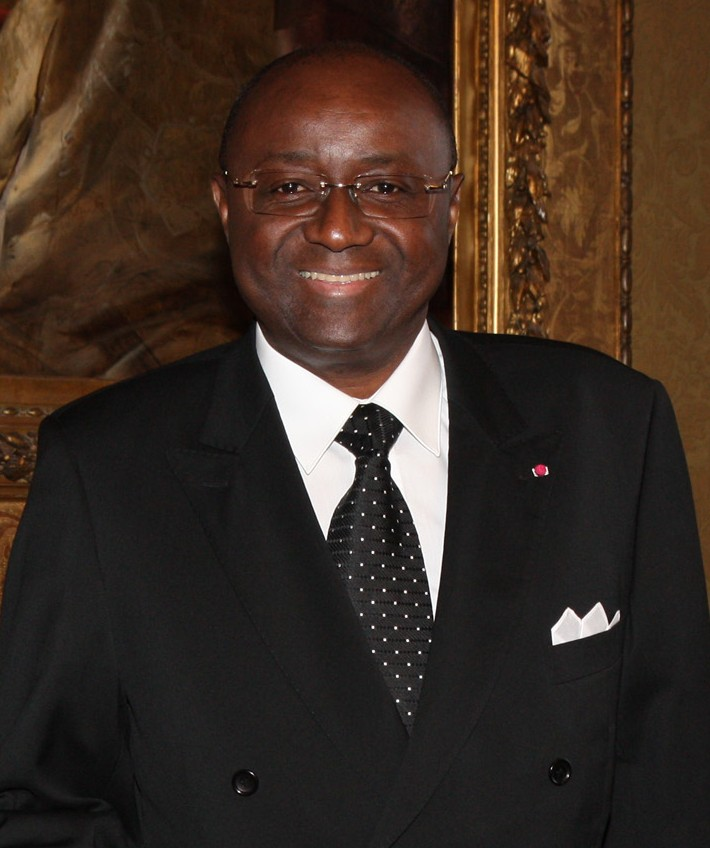
- Pierre Moukoko Mbonjo in 2013

Minister of External Relations of Cameroon
- In office December 2011 – October 2015
- President: Paul Biya
- Prime Minister: Philémon Yang

Minister of Communication of Cameroon
- In office December 2004 – September 2006
- President: Paul Biya
- Prime Minister: Ephraim Inoni

Personal details
- Born: 25 July 1954 (age 71)

Pierre Moukoko Mbonjo (born 25 July 1954) is a Cameroonian politician who served in the government of Cameroon as Minister for External Relations from 2011 to 2015.

He was Minister of Communication from 2004 to 2006. He was appointed as Minister of External Affairs on 9 December 2011. After nearly four years as Minister of External Relations, he was dismissed from the government on 2 October 2015.
