= National Commission for the Promotion of Bilingualism and Multiculturalism =

The National Commission for the Promotion of Bilingualism and Multiculturalism (abbreviated as NCPBM and also known as the Bilingualism Commission) is the consultative organ responsible for promoting Bilingualism and Multiculturalism in Cameroon with a view to:

- maintaining peace;
- Consolidation the country’s unity;
- Strengthening its people’s willingness and day to day experience with respect to living together.

== Creation ==
The Commission was created by Presidential decree No: 2017/013 of 23 January 2017 as an advisory body with legal personality and financial autonomy. The NCPBM is placed under the Authority of the President of the Republic.

== Missions ==
Its main missions include:

- Submit reports and recommendations on issues relating to the protection of Bilingualism and Multiculturalism to the President of the Republic;
- Monitor the healthy implementation of article 1 sub (3) of the constitution on the equal status of French and English as two official languages;
- Conduct studies and surveys proposing measures likely to strengthen the bilingual and multicultural character of the Cameroon;
- Prepare and submit draft instruments on bilingualism, multiculturalism and togetherness;
- Receive petitions against discriminations arising from noncompliance with the constitutional provisions on bilingualism and multiculturalism and report thereon to the President of the Republic;
- Perform any other tasks assigned to it by the President of the Republic, including mediation.

== Chairman ==
- Peter Mafany Musonge (2017–present)
