= National Broadcasting Council Cameroon =

The National Communication Council (abbreviated NCC; French: Conseil National de la Communication) is a regulatory and consultative body for social communication in Cameroon. It has legal personality and financial autonomy and it is placed under the authority of the office of the Prime Minister of Cameroon. The council was created by Law No. 90/052 of 19 December 1990 on freedom of social communication and its organisation is governed by Decree No. 2012/038 of 23 January 2012 reorganising the National Communication Council.

== History ==
The NCC was created under Law No. 90/052 of 19 December 1990 on freedom of social communication. This law was a component of the several changes to media regulation within Cameroon in the early 1990s.

The council's structure, powers and role as a regulatory and consultative body were later reorganised by Decree No. 2012/038 of 23 January 2012, where it was given a clearer role in regulating media. Its responsibilities included advising on communication policy, monitoring respect for media laws and professional ethics, and issuing opinions on audio-visual licences and the allocation of radio frequencies among other matters. The decree also confirmed that the NCC was placed under the authority of the Prime Minister of Cameroon.

The council's disciplinary powers have been described as controversial among some Cameroonian journalists. A study of private print journalists found that criticism of the council was linked mainly to concerns about its independence its power to sanction media organisations and journalists, and its appointment system.

== Organisation ==
The NCC is placed under the authority of the Prime Minister of Cameroon. It is composed of nine members, including a President and a Vice-President, who are appointed by decree of the President of the Republic of Cameroon. The council also has a General Secretariat led by a Secretary-General, who is similarly appointed by decree of the President of the Republic.

The council is currently headquartered in the Bastos neighbourhood of Yaoundé.

== Mandate and Functions ==
The NCC is responsible for monitoring respect for laws and regulations on social communication in Cameroon. Its mandate includes promoting professional ethics in the media sector, protecting social peace, national unity and national integration and supporting the promotion of national languages and cultures through the media.

Furthermore, the council is responsible for promoting human rights, democracy and peace in the media. Its functions include protecting individual dignity, particularly of children and young people, ensuring equal access to the media during election periods, and supporting freedom and responsibility in the media sector.

In relation to broadcasting and audio-visual communication, the NCC issues opinions on applications for licences to create and operate private audio-visual communication companies. It also gives opinions on government reports relating to the allocation of audio-visual frequencies and is consulted before contentious appeals concerning the refusal or withdrawal of press cards.

== Regulatory powers ==
The NCC has disciplinary powers over bodies and professionals in the social communication sector. Its disciplinary measures include warnings, temporary suspension of activities and definitive bans on activities.

== Criticism and independence concerns ==
The council's independence has been questioned by some Cameroonian journalists. A study of private print journalists found that criticism of the NCC was linked to its relationship with the executive, the appointment of its members by presidential decree, and its power to sanction media organisations and journalists.

The same study found that many journalists did not oppose the existence of the media regulator itself, but objected to the council's composition and method of operation. The respondents of the study generally preferred a model of self-regulation or co-regulation, in which journalists would have a greater role in selecting those responsible for regulating the media sector.

== Heads of the council since creation ==
The following people have headed the council since its creation in 1990:

Table of the Heads of the NCC since 1990
| Head of the Council | Term Served |
|---|---|
| Felix Sabbel Lecco | 1990–2010 |
| Mgr. Joseph Befe | 2011–2015 |
| Peter Essoka | 2015–2021 |
| Joseph Chebonkeng Kalabubse | 2021–present |
