= Polycarpe Abah Abah =

Cameroonian politician (1954)

Minister of the Economy and Finance
- In office December 8, 2004 – 2008
- Succeeded by: Essimi Menye

Personal details
- Born: September 17, 1954 (age 71) Zoetele, South Region, Cameroon
- Spouse: Caroline Meva
- Education: University of Yaounde I University of Southern California; ENAM

Polycarpe Abah Abah is a Cameroonian politician who served as the Minister of Economy and Finance from 2004 and 2008 until his arrest in Operation Sparrowhawk.

== Biography ==
Abah was born on September 17, 1954, in Zoétélé, South Region, Cameroon. He graduated with honors from Manemgoumba high school in 1974. Abah studied economics at the University of Yaoundé, and then obtained a master's degree in public administration from the University of Southern California, a diploma in finance management from the Atlanta Institute of Management, and another from the International Law Institute in Washington, D.C.. He also studied at the National School of Administration and Magistracy (ENAM).

After graduating from ENAM, Abah was appointed to the petroleum department of the Tax Directorate, tasked with implementing petroleum taxation in Cameroon. He worked closely with the Société Nationale des Hydrocarbures (SNH). The discovery of oil off the coast of Cameroon was long considered a state secret, which led to his appointment as the state representative on the SNH's board of directors, a position he held until his appointment to Minister of Economy.

Within the Tax Directorate, Abah served as deputy director of Tax Legislation in 1983, and then as a member of the National Public Procurement Commission for several years. He became an expert within CEMAC, and left the directorate in 1988. Between 1988 and 1992, Abah was appointed Attache to the General Secretariat of the Presidency, where he served as a liaison between the Ministry of Economy and international banking organizations like the IMF and World Bank Group. With the creation of the Prime Minister's office in 1991, he was appointed there and continued to do the same work as before.

From 1998 to 2004, Abah was the Director of Taxation in the Ministry of Economy. Within six years, tax administration revenues tripled from 250,000,000,000 CFA in 1998 to 750,000,000,000 CFA in 2004. On December 8, 2004, Abah was appointed Minister of the Economy and Finance. The Cameroonian GDP growth rate grew from 2% in 2003 to over 4% in 2005.

After 2008, Abah was implicated in Operation Sparrowhawk, an anti-corruption operation within the Cameroonian government launched in 2006 by Ephraïm Inoni. Between 2008 and 2022, Abah was convicted six times by the Special Criminal Court for various cases of corruption and embezzlement. Abah was acquitted for two of them; the Lydienne Eyoum affair and the VAT affair. He was sentenced to 81 years in prison, and was deemed the political figure most affected by Operation Sparrowhawk. Abah continues to deny the accusations against him.
