= Hayatou =

Hayatou is a surname. Notable people with the surname include:

- Issa Hayatou (born 1946), Cameroonian athlete and sports executive
- Sadou Hayatou (1942–2019), Cameroonian politician and Prime Minister of Cameroon
