= Museum of Civilizations (Dschang) =

Museum in Cameroon

The Museum of Civilizations of Dschang (Musée des Civilisations du Cameroun, or Musée des Civilisations de Dschang) was established in 2010 in Dschang, Cameroon in the Menoua division. Managed by the Dschang community, the Museum maintains a diversity of collections highlighting both its local Dschang sociocultural histories and those of the broader Cameroonian peoples. The Museum aims to create a space where local and non-local communities can appreciate and experience the breadth and richness of Cameroon's diverse cultural and social histories. Located on the shores of Lake Dschang, the Museum has become a popular place of cultural and leisurely activity in the community.

== History ==
The Dschang civilization museum was created in 2010.This museum is a testimony of a collaborative effort between the local authorities, the city of Nantes in France and the program "La Route des Chefferies", who united their resources to make this museum a major pole of cultural tourism in Cameroon.

== Mission ==
The museum was created to preserve and promote the rich cultural heritage of Cameroon. It distinguishes itself by its ambition to unite and transmit the traditions, history and skills of the different Cameroonian communities while promoting the cultural exchange across borders. Visitors can discover the origins of the Cameroon and the diversity of the four great cultural areas of the country.

== Administration ==
Administration council

The council was created on the 31st, March 2010 with Jean Nkuete as president. From 2009 to 2013, Rachel Mariambe worked as vice director.

== Funding ==
The museum is supported through international cooperation and the city of Nantes.

== Tourism and exploration ==
It is one of the most visited museums in Cameroon. It communicates the cultural heritage of Cameroon the structures it receives from the Western region to visitors. Additionally, the nautical base hosts sporting and other activities for all.

== Architecture and space organization ==
The building contains many shapes such as spider, elephant, mask and buffalo. The architecture of the museum seeks to translate, through its various forms and organization the cultural and imaginary values of the Cameroonian societies.

The building is located beside the Dschang municipal lake.

The museum measures 1000m². It contains two conical zincs and was constructed by Sylvain Djache Nzefa.

== Other activities ==
There are many activities such as guidance, conservation and conferences with youths and schools.

== Collection ==
This museum proposes an exploration of the cultural wealth and roots of the Cameroonians and the museum conserves about 500 objects.

These collections represent the principal cultural areas of the country, notably the forests societies, of the littoral, of the sudano-sahelian regions and of the Grassfields.

The exposed objects include masks, sculptures, ritual objects and also elements linked to social practices, politics and traditional cultures. This set of objects seeks to ease the comprehension of Cameroonian history and culture.

== Permanent exhibitions ==
These collections are divided into six principal sections:

1. History and Foundations of Cameroon
2. Southern Cameroon
3. The Coast
4. Northern Cameroon
5. Western Cameroon
6. The Chiefdoms Route Program

== Temporary exhibitions ==
Independence of Cameroon, let us deliver the memory was an exhibition which took place from 17 June 2023 to 30 March 2024 at the Dschang civilization museum.

== Craft center ==
The museum has a craft center where visitors can find derived products and cultural editions.
