= Ministry of Finance (Cameroon) =

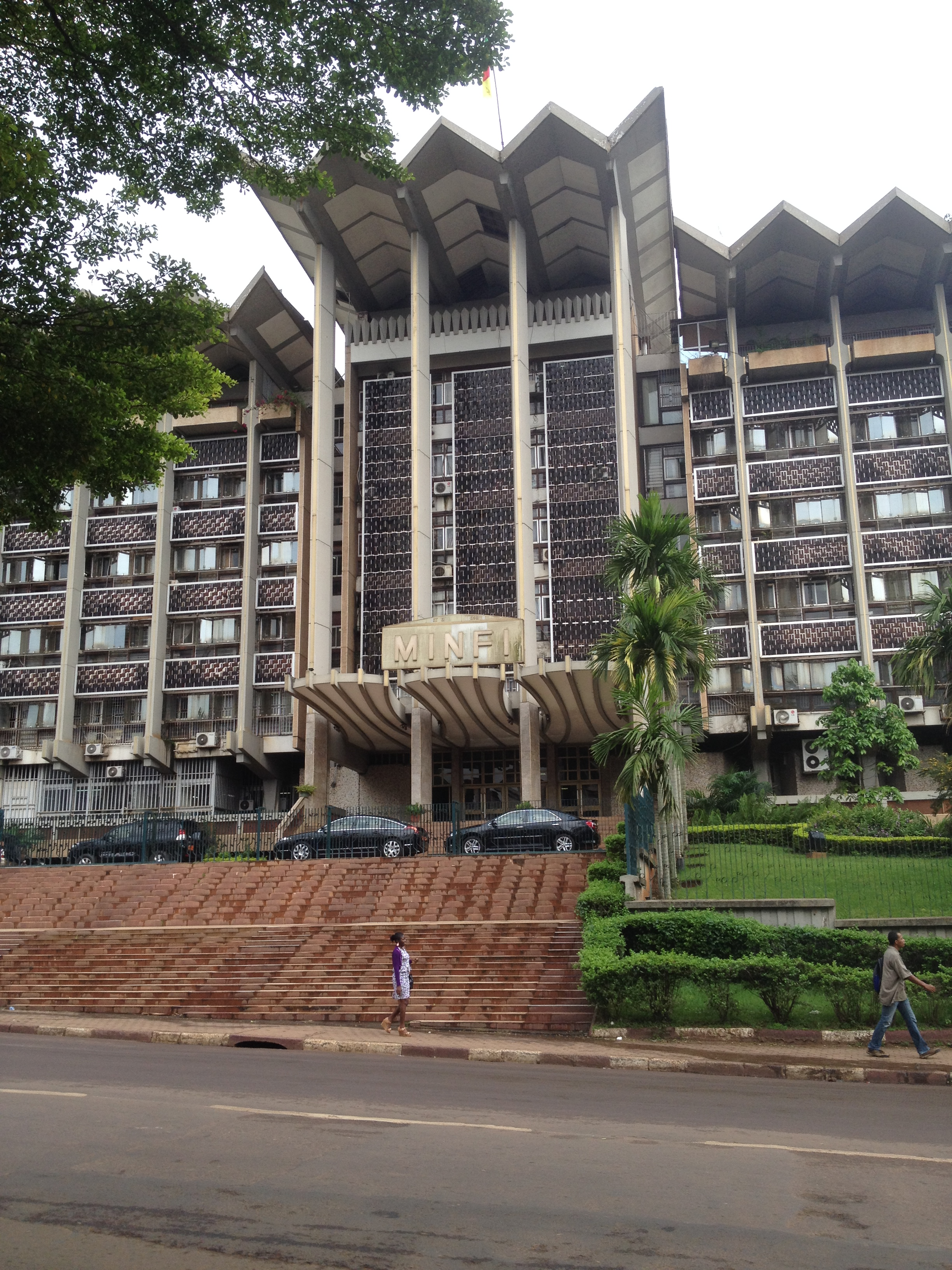
Ministry of Finance in Yaoundé

The Ministry of Finance of Cameroon is responsible for the public finance policies of Cameroon.

== Ministers of Finance ==
- Arouna N'Joya, 1957-1958
- Charles Assalé, 1958-1959
- Charles Onana Awana, 1963-1964
- Victor Kanga, 1964-1966
- Simon Nko'o Etoungou, 1966-1968
- Aloys Medjo me Zengue, 1968
- Bernard Bidias à Ngon, 1968-1972
- Charles Onana Awana, 1972-1975
- Marcel Yondo, 1975-1978
- Gilbert Ntang, 1978-1983
- Etienne Ntsama, 1983-1985
- Édouard Koulla, 1985-1986
- André Booto à Ngon, 1986-1987
- Sadou Hayatou, 1987-1990
- Simon Bassilekin, 1990-1991
- Justin Ndioro à Yombo, 1991-1992
- Antoine Ntsimi, 1992-1994
- Justin Ndioro à Yombo, 1994-1996
- Édouard Akame Mfoumou, 1996-2001
- Michel Meva'a M'Eboutou, 2001-2004
- Polycarpe Abah Abah, 2004-2007
- Essimi Menye, 2007-2011
- Alamine Ousmane Mey, 2011-2018
- Louis-Paul Motazé, 2018-

== See also ==
- Finance ministry
- Economy of Cameroon
- Politics of Cameroon
