= Laurent Esso =

Cameroonian politician

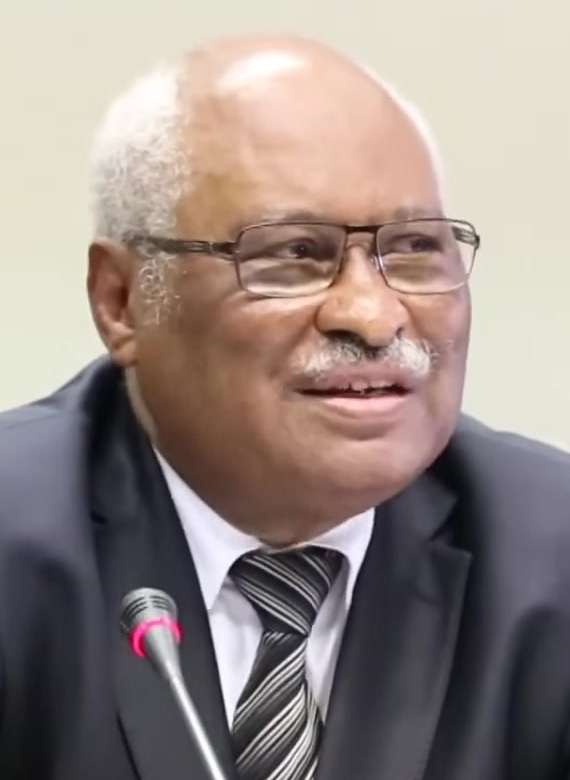

Cameroon Minister of State Minister of Justice Keeper of Seal
- Incumbent
- Assumed office 9 December 2011
- President: Paul Biya
- Prime Minister: Philémon Yang
- Preceded by: Amadou Ali

Minister of State Secretary General at the Presidency of the Republic
- In office 22 Septembre 2006 – 8 December 2011
- President: Paul Biya
- Prime Minister: Ephraïm Inoni; Philémon Yang
- Succeeded by: Ferdinand Ngoh Ngoh

Minister of External Relations
- In office 8 December 2004 – 21 September 2006
- President: Paul Biya
- Prime Minister: Ephraïm Inoni

Personal details
- Born: 10 August 1942 (age 84) Douala (Cameroon)
- Party: CPDM
- Education: University of Yaoundé; ENAM
- Profession: Magistrate

Laurent Esso (born 10 August 1942) is a Cameroonian politician who is currently serving in Joseph Ngute's government.

Esso held a succession of key posts under President Paul Biya since 1988. He served in the government of Cameroon as Minister of Justice from 1996 to 2000, Minister of Public Health from 2000 to 2001, Minister of Defense from 2001 to 2004, and Minister of Foreign Affairs from 2004 to 2006. Subsequently, Esso was Secretary-General of the Presidency, with the rank of Minister of State, from September 2006 to December 2011. He has again served as Minister of Justice since December 2011.

== Early life and education ==
Laurent Esso was born on 10 August 1942 in Douala, Cameroon. He studied law and later went to the National School of Administration and Magistracy (ENAM), where he was trained to become a senior government official.

== Biography ==
An ethnic Sawa, Esso was born at Douala. He was a magistrate and subsequently worked as Chancellor of the University of Yaoundé.

Esso left his post at the University of Yaoundé when President Paul Biya appointed him as Deputy Secretary-General of the Presidency on 16 May 1988. Considered a "reform-minded technocrat", Esso spent less than a year as Deputy Secretary-General of the Presidency before Biya instead appointed him as Director of the Civil Cabinet of the Presidency on 13 April 1989. Esso remained Director of the Civil Cabinet for seven years; he was then appointed Minister of Justice in the government named on 19 September 1996. On 18 March 2000, he was moved from his position as Justice Minister to that of Minister of Public Health; after one year in the latter position, he was appointed Minister-Delegate at the Presidency in charge of Defense on 27 April 2001. In the government named on 8 December 2004, he was instead appointed Minister of Foreign Affairs, in which position he remained until he was appointed Minister of State and Secretary-General of the Presidency on 22 September 2006.

Noted for his quiet discretion and firm loyalty to Paul Biya, Esso is considered to be one of Biya's most trusted and powerful associates. According to one analysis, Esso had "a reputation for technocratic competence and integrity" that distinguished him in the Biya regime. He is a member of the ruling Cameroon People's Democratic Movement and was a member of the National Commission for the coordination of Biya's election campaign in the October 2004 presidential election.

After holding the key post of Secretary-General of the Presidency for five years, Esso was instead appointed to his former post as Minister of Justice on 9 December 2011.

On 14 February 2023, the government commissioner of the military tribunal requested an additional investigation from the State Secretariat for Defense (SED), in the case of Martinez Zogo, a journalist kidnapped on 17 January 2023 and whose lifeless body was found five days later, on the outskirts of Yaoundé. The military court requested the hearing of Laurent Esso in this case.
