= Jean Nkuete =

Cameroonian politician and economist (born 1944)

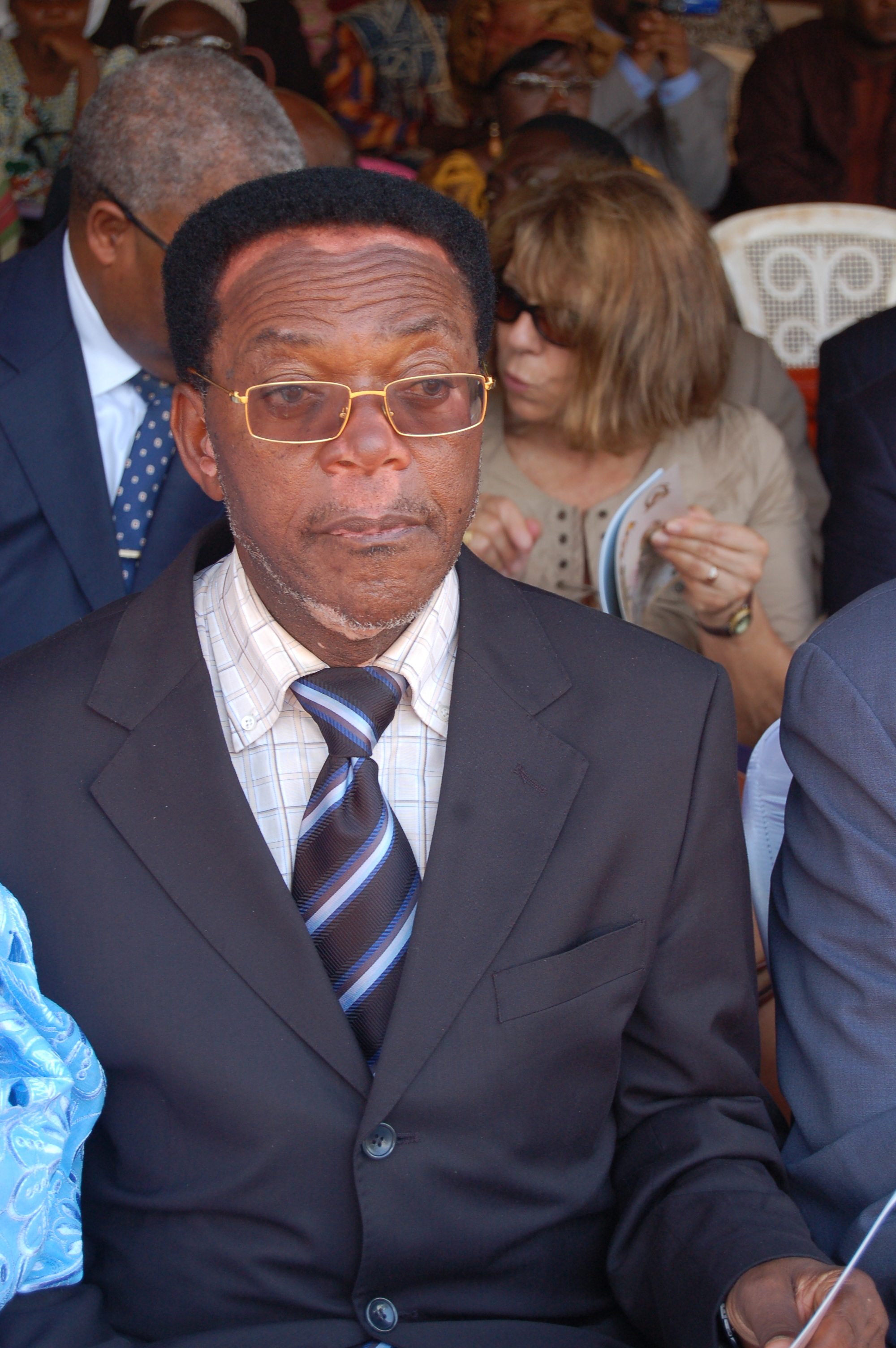
- Nkuete in 2011

Secretary-General of the Cameroon People's Democratic Movement
- Incumbent
- Assumed office 9 December 2011
- President: Paul Biya
- Preceded by: René Emmanuel Sadi

Deputy Prime Minister of Cameroon
- In office 10 September 2007 – 9 December 2011 Serving with Amadou Ali
- Prime Minister: Philémon Yang

Minister of Agriculture and Rural Development
- In office 22 September 2006 – 9 December 2011
- Prime Minister: Ephraïm Inoni; Philémon Yang
- Preceded by: Clobert Tchatat
- Succeeded by: Essimi Menye

Personal details
- Born: 1944 (age 81–82) Balessing, French Cameroon
- Party: RDPC

Jean Nkuete (born 1944) is a Cameroonian politician and economist who has been Secretary-General of the Central Committee of the Cameroon People's Democratic Movement (RDPC), the ruling political party in Cameroon, since 2011. He was Executive Secretary of the Economic and Monetary Community of Central Africa (CEMAC) from 1999 to 2006 and served in the government of Cameroon as Minister of Agriculture and Rural Development from 2006 to 2011 (with the rank of deputy prime minister beginning in 2007).

== Political career ==
Nkuete, a Roman Catholic belonging to the Bamileke ethnic group, was born at Balessing in Menoua Department in 1944. He received his higher education in Italy from 1963 to 1969 and then returned to Cameroon, where he began working at the Ministry of Planning in 1969 after obtaining his PHD. He was Head of the Department of General Planning from August 1969 to 1972 and Deputy Director of Planning and Regional Development from August 1974 to 1975. Nkuete was then appointed to work under Prime Minister Paul Biya as Director of Economic and Technical Affairs in 1975, and subsequently he was Technical Adviser to the Cabinet of the Prime Minister from October 1977 to September 1981. Nkuete was Deputy Director-General of PARIBAS-Cameroon Bank from September 1981 to April 1983.

After Biya became president, he appointed Nkuete as Deputy Secretary-General of the Presidency, with the rank of Minister, on April 13, 1983. Considered "Biya's most trusted associate", Nkuete was promoted to the post of Secretary-General of the Government on November 21, 1986. As Secretary-General of the Government, with the rank of Minister, Nkuete was responsible for coordinating ministries. He was said to have a "bad public image" at that time. After two years as Secretary-General of the Government, he left the post when he was appointed by the Governor of the Bank of Central African States (BEAC) to replace Simon Bassilekin as Director of the BEAC's Douala Agency on December 1, 1988. He worked as BEAC's Douala Director from 1988 to 1999 before becoming Executive Secretary of CEMAC in 1999. After seven years at CEMAC, Biya appointed him to the Cameroonian government as Minister of State for Agriculture and Rural Development on September 22, 2006.

In a cabinet reshuffle on September 7, 2007, Nkuete was promoted to the rank of Deputy Prime Minister, while remaining in charge of agriculture and rural development; he was installed as Deputy Prime Minister on September 10.

After five years in the government, Nkuete was dismissed from it and instead appointed as Secretary-General of the Central Committee of the Cameroon People's Democratic Movement (RDPC) on 9 December 2011.

=== Party positions ===
Nkuete was a member of the Central Committee and the Political Bureau of the ruling Cameroon National Union and remained in these positions when the party was transformed into the Cameroon People's Democratic Movement (RDPC) in 1985. He left the Political Bureau in 1989, but remained a member of the Central Committee.

On 4 April 2007, Biya, in his capacity as National President of the RDPC, appointed Nkuete as the RDPC's National Secretary for Economic and Social Affairs and Employment. During the campaign for the July 2007 parliamentary and municipal elections, Nkuete was a member of the RDPC's Central Campaign Committee; he was also a Vice-President of the RDPC Provincial Campaign Committee in West Province.
