= Luc Ayang =

Cameroonian politician (1947–2025)

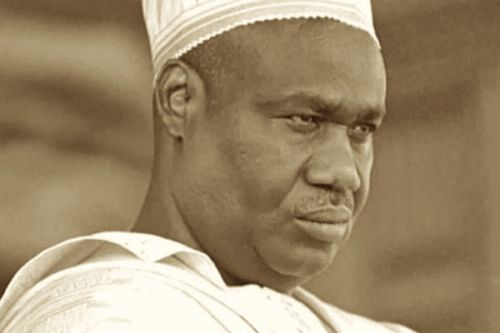

3rd Prime Minister of Cameroon
- In office 22 August 1983 – 25 January 1984
- President: Paul Biya
- Preceded by: Bello Bouba Maigari
- Succeeded by: Sadou Hayatou (1991)

Personal details
- Born: 1947 Doukoula, French Cameroon
- Died: 14 October 2025 (aged 77–78)
- Party: CPDM
- Education: University of Yaoundé

Luc Ayang (1947 – 14 October 2025) was a Cameroonian politician who served as 3rd Prime Minister of Cameroon from 1983 to 1984. He was President of the Economic and Social Council of Cameroon from 1984.

== Early life and career ==
An ethnic Kirdi and a Christian, Ayang was born in 1947, at Doukoula, located in the Karhay District of Mayo-Danay Department in the Far North Region. He graduated from the University of Yaounde with a degree in law and economics in 1972. In March 1975, he was appointed to a post in the Secretariat-General of the Presidency, as Head of the Service of Legislation and Regulation in the Division of Administrative and Legal Affairs. He was then named First Deputy Prefect of Ngaoundéré in September 1976, before entering the government as Minister of Livestock, Fisheries and Animal Industries on 2 May 1978. After five years in that position, he became Prime Minister of Cameroon, on an interim basis, under President Paul Biya, serving from 22 August 1983 to 25 January 1984, when the post of Prime Minister was eliminated through a constitutional amendment.

From 1984, Ayang was the President of the Economic and Social Council. He was also a member of the Political Bureau of the ruling Cameroon People's Democratic Movement (CPDM). During the campaign for the 2004 presidential election, Ayang was a vice-president of the support and follow-up committee of Biya's election campaign in the Far North Region. Later, during the campaign for the July 2007 parliamentary and municipal elections, Ayang was a member of the CPDM's Central Campaign Committee; he was also President of the CPDM Provincial Campaign Committee in the Far North Region.

In June 2013 he delivered a message from President Biya to Angolan President José Eduardo dos Santos seeking a general increase in cooperation between the two countries.

== Personal life and death ==
Ayang was married with three children. He died on 14 October 2025, at the age of 78.

Political offices
Preceded by Maigari Bello Bouba	Prime Minister of Cameroon; 1983–1984	Vacant
