= Jules Doret Ndongo =

Cameroonian politician

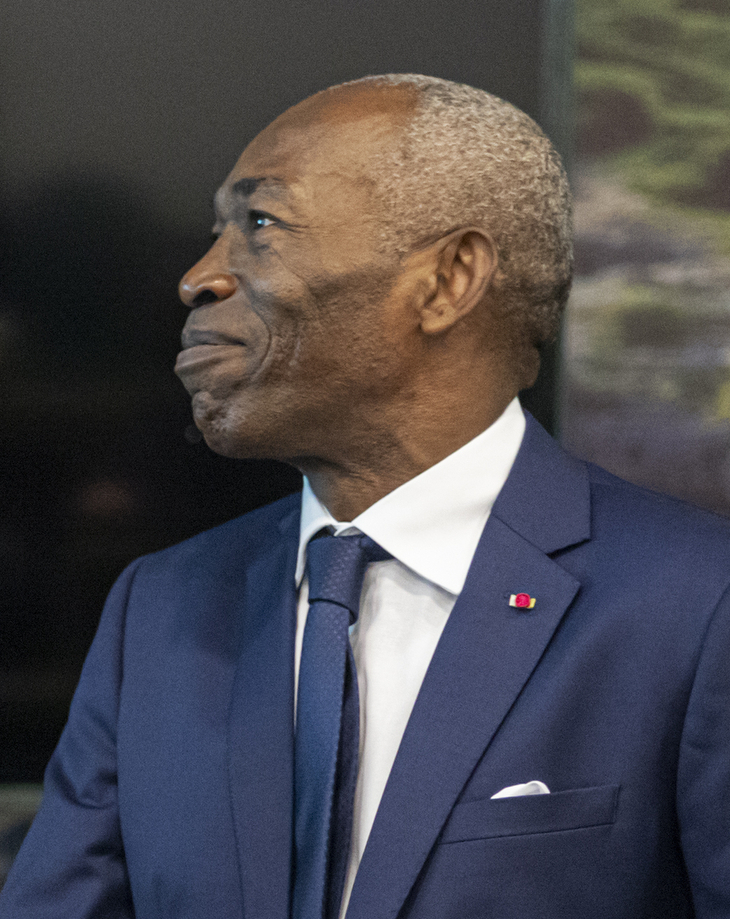
- Ndongo in 2023

Minister of Forestry and Wildlife
- Incumbent
- Assumed office 2 March 2018
- Prime Minister: Philémon Yang; Joseph Ngute
- Preceded by: Philip Ngole Ngwese

Minister-Delegate for Decentralized Local Authorities
- In office 9 December 2011 – 2 March 2018
- Prime Minister: Philémon Yang
- Preceded by: Emmanuel Edou
- Succeeded by: Georges Elanga Obam (as Minister)

Personal details
- Born: Kribi, Cameroon
- Party: CPDM

Jules Doret Ndongo is a Cameroonian politician and the Minister of Forestry and Wildlife since 2018.

Since December 9, 2011, he has held the position of Minister Delegate to the Territorial Administration in charge of decentralized local authorities.

== Biography ==
He comes from Kribi, the capital of Océan.

In 2010, he was the president of the commission for coordinating and supervising the special recruitment of 25,000 graduates in the public service. He was one of the elected members of the central committee of the ruling political party, the Cameroon People's Democratic Movement (RDPC) during the party congress organized on September 16, 2011. Also during 2011, he was the secretary general of the Cameroonian Prime Minister's services.

On 4 February 2020, he and Joseph Ngute signed a proposal to reclassify most of the Ebo Wildlife Reserve to logging area. The decision was reverted after a group of scientists sent a letter asking for such. Since 27 April 2023, the area has been reclassified for logging.

On April 17, 2024, he helped create a collaboration between the Cameroonian government and the Research Institute for Development.

On 19 June 2025, he launched phase six of the Programme for the Sustainable Management of Natural Resources in the South West Region—a plan to protect ecosystems in southwest Cameroon, launched in 2006.
