= Arouna N'Joya =

Cameroonian politician

Member of the French Senate
- In office 1947–1958

Minister of Finance of French Cameroon
- In office 1957–1958

Personal details
- Born: 1908 Foumban, Cameroon
- Died: November 1971 (aged 62–63)
- Occupation: Politician

Arouna N'Joya (born 1908 in Foumban, Cameroon, and died November 1971) was a politician from Cameroon who served in the French Senate from 1947-1958. He was the Minister of Finance of French Cameroon from 1957 to 1958. He received a Resistance Medal after the Second World War.
