= Simon Achidi Achu =

Prime Minister of Cameroon from 1992 to 1996

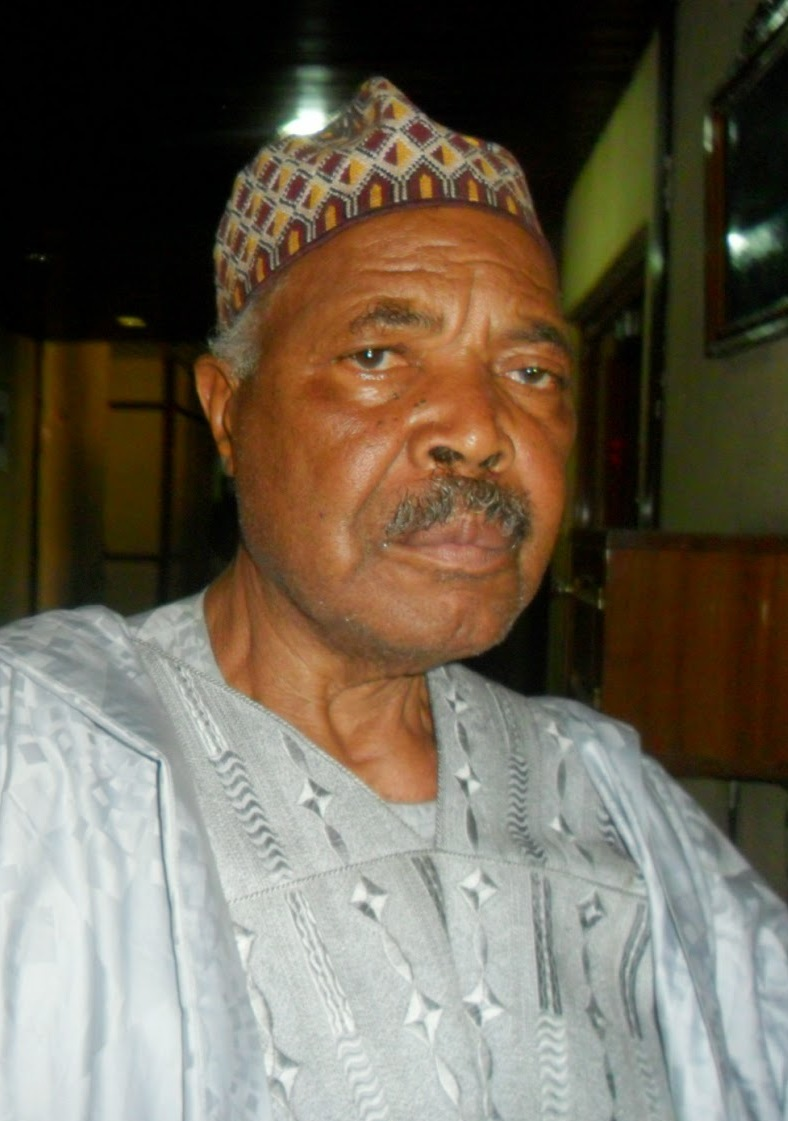
- Achidi Achu in 2020

5th Prime Minister of Cameroon
- In office 9 April 1992 – 19 September 1996
- President: Paul Biya
- Preceded by: Sadou Hayatou
- Succeeded by: Peter Mafany Musonge

Member of the Senate of Cameroon for the Northwest Region
- In office 14 May 2013 – 4 May 2021

Member of the National Assembly for Mezam
- In office May 1988 – 9 April 1992

Minister of Justice
- In office 3 July 1972 – 30 June 1975
- Prime Minister: Paul Biya
- Preceded by: Félix Sabal Lecco
- Succeeded by: Joseph Charles Doumba

Personal details
- Born: 5 November 1934 Bamenda, British Cameroon
- Died: 4 May 2021 (aged 86) United States
- Party: CPDM

Simon Achidi Achu (5 November 1934 – 4 May 2021) was a Cameroonian politician who served as the prime minister of Cameroon from 1992 to 1996. Previously he was Minister of Justice from 1972 to 1975. A leading member of the Cameroon People's Democratic Movement (CPDM), Achidi Achu was appointed Chairman of the National Investment Corporation in 2003, and he was elected to the Senate of Cameroon in 2013.

== Early life and career ==
Achidi Achu was born in Bamenda and grew up in Santa, located in the Northwest Province of Cameroon. He completed primary education in Santa and then continued to Cameroon Protestant College, where he had his GCE Ordinary Level. Pa Achu later continued to the University of Yaoundé, where he participated in the creation of the Student Association, which still exists. He also served as the association's first president. He continued his studies in Marseille, France.

== Political career ==
Achidi Achu was a state magistrate from October 1965 to October 1966. Later, he was appointed Minister Delegate at the State Federal Inspectorate in late October 1971. He was subsequently appointed Minister of Justice by Cameroonian President Ahmadou Ahidjo on 3 July 1972, remaining in that position until 1975. Pa Simon then returned to Santa and started the Rock Farm Ranch as a farmer.

He stayed out of politics for several years, then he was elected as a member of the National Assembly. President Paul Biya later appointed him Prime Minister on 9 April 1992, following the March 1992 parliamentary election. He was the first Anglophone Prime Minister of Cameroon.

On 10 October 1992, the day before the 1992 presidential election, Achidi Achu appeared on Cameroon Radio and Television and addressed the people in French, his second language. In this address, he accused the opposition, led by Social Democratic Front (SDF) candidate John Fru Ndi, of having a "diabolical plan" (plan diabolique) to prosecute and execute the leading figures of the state, government, and military if it won the election, and he urged the people to reject the opposition in order to avert potential violence and instability.

Following Biya's victory in the 1992 election, Achidi Achu remained Prime Minister until 19 September 1996, when he was replaced by Peter Mafany Musonge. Achidi Achu was later appointed Chairman of the Board of Directors of the National Investment Corporation (Société nationale des Investissements) on 3 March 2003.

== Later life ==
Achidi Achu was a member of the Central Committee of the ruling CPDM. He was also a member of the National Commission for the coordination of Biya's election campaign in the 2004 presidential election and was the president of the campaign's support and follow up committee in the Northwest Province. He has also headed the discipline commission of the CPDM. During the campaign for the July 2007 parliamentary and municipal elections, Achidi Achu was a member of the CPDM's Central Campaign Committee; he was also President of the CPDM Provincial Campaign Committee in the Northwest Province.

In 2009, Achidi Achu became one of three members of the CPDM North West Section's newly established Council of the Wise, which was intended to formulate strategy and tactics to enable the CPDM to attain dominance in the North West Province, where the opposition Social Democratic Front (SDF) has been traditionally dominant.

In the April 2013 Senate election, Achidi Achu was elected to the Senate as the top candidate on the CPDM's list for Northwest Province. When the Bureau of the Senate was elected on 12 June 2013, Achidi Achu received the post of Vice-President of the Senate.

He died on 4 May 2021, at the age of 86, after recovering from an illness in the United States.

Political offices
Preceded by Sadou Hayatou	Prime Minister of Cameroon; 1992–1996	Succeeded by Peter Mafany Musonge
