= Institut national des sciences et techniques nucléaires =

Nuclear energy training scool in Cadarache, France

National Institute for Nuclear Science and Technology
- Institut national des sciences et techniques nucléaire
- Established: 1956
- Students: 1,100
- Doctoral students: 1,500
- Location: Paris Saclay, Cadarache, Cherbourg-Octeville, Grenoble, Marcoule, France; 48.7117343°N 2.1712888°E
- Website: INSTN

L'Institut national des sciences et techniques nucléaires (INSTN, National Institute for Nuclear Science and Technology), is a public higher education institution administered by the CEA (French Alternative Energies and Atomic Energy Commission) under the joint authority of the Ministry of National Education, Higher Education and Research, the Ministry of the Economy, Industry and the Digital Sector and the Ministry of the Environment, Energy and Marine Affairs. It is the main centre of education for nuclear energy in France.

== History ==
The establishment of INSTN goes back to 1956 with the purpose of training engineers, researchers, and technicians who were tasked with implementing the French civil nuclear development program introduced in the 1950s.

Since its creation, the mission of INSTN has been to support the transfer of knowledge and know-how developed by the CEA and its industrial partners in order to support the growth of the nuclear industry worldwide. One of its main contributions has been to develop human resources required in both research and industry, at various level of qualification from operator to researcher in the nuclear industry.

== Structure ==
It is part of the Saclay Nuclear Research Centre.

== See also ==
- French Alternative Energies and Atomic Energy Commission (CEA)
