= Antoine Ntsimi =

Cameroonian economist and politician

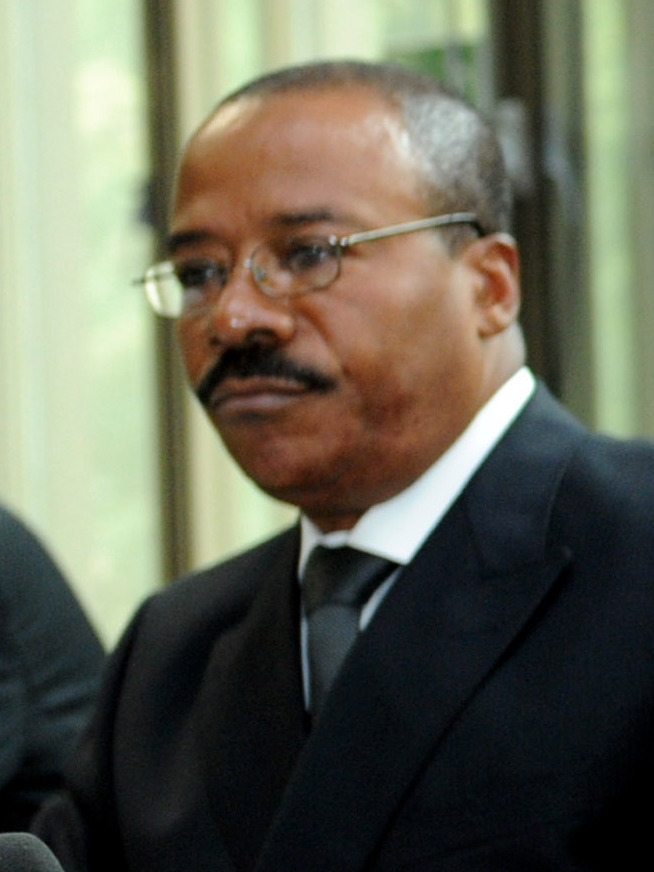
- Ntsimi in 2009

President of the Committee of the Economic and Monetary Community of Central
- In office 25 April 2007 – 5 September 2012

Minister of Finance of Cameroon
- In office 1992–1994
- Preceded by: Justin Ndioro à Yombo
- Succeeded by: Justin Ndioro à Yombo

Personal details
- Born: March 31st 1955 Cameroon

Antoine Ntsimi (born March 31, 1955, in Cameroon) is a Cameroonian economist and politician. He is the first president of the Committee of the Economic and Monetary Community of Central (CEMAC) since April 25, 2007.

== Biography ==
=== In the United States ===
Antoine Ntsimi holds a Bachelor of Science degree in finance, a Master of Science degree in economics and an MBA from the Chicago Booth School of Business. Antoine Ntsimi also graduated from the Loan Officer Development School of the Bank of Boston with maxima cum laude.

He was appointed vice president at the headquarters of the Boston Bank in the United States as a specialist in trading operations. Afterwards, he became part of the team in charge of opening the Nigerian American Merchant Bank Limited in Nigeria.

=== In Cameroon ===
Antoine Ntsimi is assigned at the Boston Bank Cameroon SA as Director of Credit and Managing Director. He then became both CEO of the Caisse Nationale de Réassurance in Cameroon (CNR), and Managing Director of the Automobile Insurance Fund (FGA) in Cameroon.

His political career began in 1992 when he was appointed Minister of Finance of Cameroon. He is in charge of the economy, the budget, the trade and the planning of the Country.

His term began when the financial and economic crisis in Cameroon was at its peak. It was also a period during which Africa had democratic demands, strikes called "ghost towns" took place, and "national conferences on governance” we're organized.

Antoine Ntsimi became Finance Minister occurs at this critical period and he must reorganize the Cameroonian economy.

To this end, he undertakes numerous structural and financial reforms to restore both the major macroeconomic balances and the confidence of donors, including the International Monetary Fund (IMF) and the World Bank.

He implements major structural, economic and financial reforms in Cameroon, including fiscal and customs reform, which will allow passage of the Customs Union of Central African States (UDEAC) in Economic and Monetary Community of Central Africa (CEMAC) in 1994.

He is the author of the restructuring of the banking system in Cameroon in the early 1990s that occurs after the bankruptcy of most banks in Cameroon.

He also worked for the implementation of value added tax (VAT) in Cameroon's economy instead of a string of charges, and the realignment of the currency CFA franc, a historical measure commonly called devaluation (REF 2). He announces this measure to the world alongside the Heads of State of the African franc zone, Michel Camdessus, then Director General of the International Monetary Fund (IMF), Michel Roussin French Minister of Cooperation and other political figures of global finance in Dakar on January 14, 1994.

Aiming to restore fiscal balance in Cameroon, he sets up the reduction in payroll staff and agents of the state, to combat fraud and reducing payroll lifestyle of state. In addition, he establishes the system of toll roads throughout the country which can bring substantial revenue to the state budget. It also introduces the export tax on logs, which allows the state to record significant revenue budget.

He develops the unique identifier system by assigning each tax payer a unique number. This system has helped increase tax revenues and reducing the informal economy in Cameroon.

Following these measures, Cameroon wins its first standby agreement with the International Monetary Fund (IMF). This agreement empowers the Cameroon to be part of his first Paris Club. The delegation is led by Antoine Ntsimi, Minister of Finance. During these meetings Cameroon has renegotiated its large stock of outstanding debt and gained access to concessional external debt.

In 1997 he was elected by universal suffrage with a significant voter base in his native Lekié, a region of Democratic Rally of the Cameroon People (CPDM). The same year he was also elected vice-president of the National Assembly of Cameroon.

=== Economic Partnerships between Central Africa Region and the European Union ===
Antoine Ntsimi is the Head of the ongoing Negotiation of Economic Partnership Agreements between Central Africa Region and the European Union. These partnership agreements aim to establish an area of free exchange between Central Africa Region and the European Union.

=== Career at the CEMAC ===
On April 5, 2005, Antoine Ntsimi was appointed by the Conference of Heads of State and the Government of the Economic Community of Central African States (CEEAC) Secretary General Assistant in charge of the Department of Physical Integration and the Economic and Monetary Department. He implemented the foundations of the Free Trade Area in the Economic Community.

On April 25, 2007, he became the first president of the Committee of the Economic and Monetary Community of Central Africa (CEMAC). At this position, he reopened the case of the free movement and travel of persons, goods and capital amongst the CEMAC countries that led to the introduction of the implementation of a biometric passport.

On September 5, 2012, he was succeeded as president by Pierre Moussa.

== See also ==
- CEMAC
- Cameroon
