= Ousmane Mey =

Cameroonian political figure

Ousmane Mey is a Cameroonian political figure who was Governor of the North Province of Cameroon from 1972 to August 1983. As of 2007, he is chairman of the Board of the National Social Insurance Fund (CNPS).

== Political career ==
A native of northern Cameroon and a friend of President Ahmadou Ahidjo, Ousmane Mey was appointed as Federal Inspector of Administration for the North Province in 1968. He was part of the small circle of Ahidjo's associates who crafted the 1972 constitution providing for a unitary state, and he was responsible for typing the initial draft. When the unitary state was established, Mey was appointed as Governor of North Province by Ahidjo in 1972. Described as "the immovable governor", he was entrusted with maintaining firm control over Ahidjo's native region and primary support base, and he strongly favored the appointment of members of the Fulbe ethnic group to administrative posts in the province. At that time the North Province encompassed the whole of northern Cameroon; its disproportionately large size and unified administration under a close ally of Ahidjo was an important factor in the stability and preservation of the Ahidjo regime, providing a secure base for Ahidjo's political power.

In an entirely unanticipated move, President Ahidjo announced his resignation on 4 November 1982 and was succeeded by Paul Biya, a southerner, two days later. Although Ahidjo voluntarily transferred power to Biya, a power struggle soon developed between the two, and Biya acted to weaken Ahidjo by splitting his key support base, the North Province, into three smaller provinces: North Province, Adamawa Province, and Far North Province. For Biya, the severity of the power struggle ultimately necessitated the removal of Ahidjo loyalists from important administrative positions, and the political influence of northerners was radically reduced as Biya worked to consolidate his power. Mey was dismissed from his post as Governor of North Province by Biya on 22 August 1983; his dismissal was concurrent with Biya's announcement of an alleged coup plot organized by Ahidjo and a purge of Ahidjo loyalists from the government.

Although key Ahidjo loyalists were removed from office during the power struggle, President Biya later restored some of them to administrative posts. He appointed Mey as Inspector-General of the Ministry of Territorial Administration and later as chairman of the Board of the CNPS.
