= Cameroon Development Corporation =

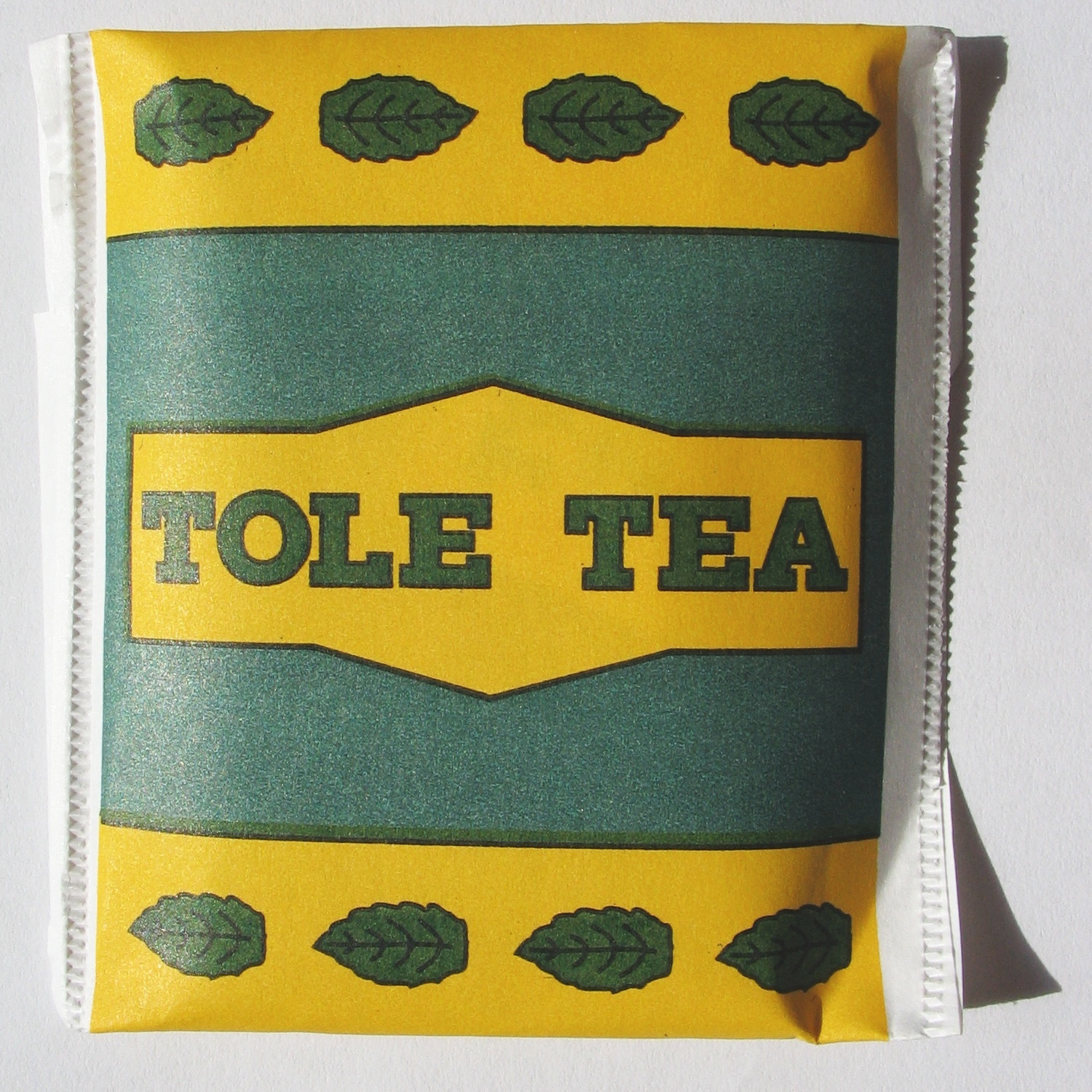
Tea produced by the CDC

The Cameroon Development Cooperation (CDC), formerly known as the Commonwealth Development Cooperation, is one of Cameroon's major exporters and employers. The CDC is an agribusiness company and its general offices are based in Bota, Limbe. Its principal products include rubber, oil palm, bananas, coconuts, tea, etc.

== History ==
The company was formed in 1947, for the purpose of developing and running plantations of tropical crops in the country.

The CDC operates in groups, with each group controlling its own crop. For example the Group Palms Management is in charge of palm tree planting, growing, harvesting of palm fruits and the production of palm oil for export and local consumption.

Staff operates in 3 levels: senior service, intermediate service and laborers.

In 2019, due to the armed conflict in the North West and South West regions of Cameroon, CDC cut half of its 22,000 jobs. At the end of 2016, its plantations extended over 38,537 ha, including 20,695 ha in rubber trees (Rubber), 13,945 ha in oil palm trees, 3,897 ha in banana plantations.

== Impact ==
The CDC is the largest employer in Cameroon and has helped the country in a cultural way. Most of the first workers in Cameroon worked on its plantations. From wages earned on these plantations, millions of Cameroonians have received an education.
