= Sadou Hayatou =

Prime Minister of Cameroon from 1991 to 1992

4th Prime Minister of Cameroon
- In office 26 April 1991 – 9 April 1992
- President: Paul Biya
- Preceded by: Luc Ayang (1984)
- Succeeded by: Simon Achidi Achu

Secretary-General of the Presidency of the Republic
- In office 7 September 1990 – 26 April 1991
- President: Paul Biya
- Preceded by: Edouard Akame Mfoumou

Minister of Finance
- In office 4 December 1987 – 7 September 1990
- President: Paul Biya
- Preceded by: André Booto à Ngon
- Succeeded by: Simon Bassilekin

Minister of Planning and Territorial Development
- In office 24 August 1985 – 4 December 1987
- President: Paul Biya
- Preceded by: Youssoupha Daouda
- Succeeded by: René Zé Nguelé

Minister of Agriculture
- In office 22 August 1983 – 24 August 1985
- President: Paul Biya
- Preceded by: Gilbert Andze Tsoungui
- Succeeded by: Jean-Baptiste Yonke

Personal details
- Born: 15 February 1942 Garoua, Cameroon
- Died: 1 August 2019 (aged 77)
- Party: CPDM
- Education: University of Toulouse

Sadou Hayatou (15 February 1942 – 1 August 2019) was a Cameroonian economist and politician who served as the 4th Prime Minister of Cameroon from 26 April 1991 to 9 April 1992.

== Early life and education ==
Sadou Hayatou was born on 15 February 1942 in Garoua, Cameroon. He studied economics at the University of Toulouse in France and later received training at the Institut des hautes études d’outre-mer (IHEOM) in Paris.

== Biography ==
Hayatou was born in Garoua. His brother, Issa Hayatou, was for a long time the President of the Confederation of African Football (CAF).

He was appointed to the government of Cameroon as Minister of Agriculture in 1984. He was the Minister of Finance of Cameroon from 1987 to 1990.

After his stint as Prime Minister, Hayatou became National Director of the Bank of Central African States (BEAC), leaving that post on January 1, 2008. Despite the official retirement age at the Bank being 60, Hayatou was kept in his post for five additional years by BEAC Governor Jean-Félix Mamalepot.

Political offices
Preceded by Luc Ayang	Prime Minister of Cameroon; 1991–1992	Succeeded by Simon Achidi Achu
