= Peter Mafany Musonge =

Prime Minister of Cameroon from 1996 to 2004

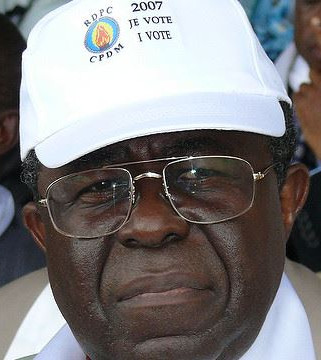
- Musonge in 2017

6th Prime Minister of Cameroon
- In office 19 September 1996 – 8 December 2004
- President: Paul Biya
- Preceded by: Simon Achidi Achu
- Succeeded by: Ephraïm Inoni

Member of the Senate of Cameroon for the Southwest Region
- In office 14 May 2013 – 22 June 2017
- Appointed by: Paul Biya

Director-General of the Cameroon Development Corporation
- In office August 1988 – 19 September 1996
- President: Paul Biya
- Preceded by: Victor E. Mukete
- Succeeded by: Henry Njalla Quan

Personal details
- Born: 3 December 1942 (age 83) Muea, British Cameroons
- Party: RDPC
- Education: Drexel University (BS); Stanford University (MS)

Peter Mafany Musonge (born 3 December 1942) is a Cameroonian engineer and politician who served as the 6th Prime Minister of Cameroon from 1996 to 2004, and was a member of the Senate from 2013 to 2017. During his tenure in the senate he was president of the Cameroon People's Democratic Movement's parliamentary group. Prior to his tenure as prime minister he was an engineer and head of the Cameroon Development Corporation from 1988 to 1996.

== Early life and education ==
Peter Mafany Musonge was born in Muea, British Cameroon, on 3 December 1942. He attended St. Joseph's College from 1957 to 1961. He graduated from Drexel University with a bachelor of science in civil engineering in 1967, and from Stanford University with a master of science in structural engineering in 1968.

== Career ==
Musonge became an engineer at the Ministry of Equipment in the 1970s. He became Director General of the National Civil Engineering Laboratory in 1980, and served until 1984. He was in charge of the National Civil Engineering Equipment Pool from 1984 to 1988. Musonge was the head of the Cameroon Development Corporation from 1988 to 1996. From 1996 to 2004, he served as Prime Minister of Cameroon.

President Paul Biya appointed Musonge to the Senate in 2013. In 2013, he was elected president of the Cameroon People's Democratic Movement (RDPC)'s parliamentary group in the senate. Musonge has been noted as a member of the gerontocracy leading Cameroon. He resigned from the senate on 22 June 2017.

== Personal life ==
Musonge is married and is the father of four children. The Order of Valour and Legion of Honour have been awarded to him.

== Works cited ==
=== News ===
- Dougueli, Georges (8 March 2022). "Cameroun: bienvenue en gérontocratie". Jeune Afrique. Archived from the original on 4 July 2025.
- Dougueli, Georges (28 June 2016). "Peter Mafany Musonge, le pilier de Biya". Jeune Afrique. Archived from the original on 4 July 2025.
- Kendemeh, Emmanuel (7 July 2017). "Cameroon: Senate - Mafany Musonge Bids Farewell". allAfrica. Archived from the original on 4 July 2025.
- Manciaux, Cécile (6 September 2013). "Peter Mafany Musonge". Jeune Afrique. Archived from the original on 4 July 2025.
- Nkwebo, Denis (13 June 2013). "Cameroun: Marcel Niat Njifenji élu président du Sénat". Jeune Afrique. Archived from the original on 4 July 2025.

=== Web ===
- "H. E. Peter Mafany Musonge". Cameroon. Archived from the original on 4 March 2024.

Political offices
Preceded by Simon Achidi Achu	Prime Minister of Cameroon; 1996–2004	Succeeded by Ephraïm Inoni
