= Joseph Ngute =

Prime Minister of Cameroon since 2019

His Excellency Joseph Ngute
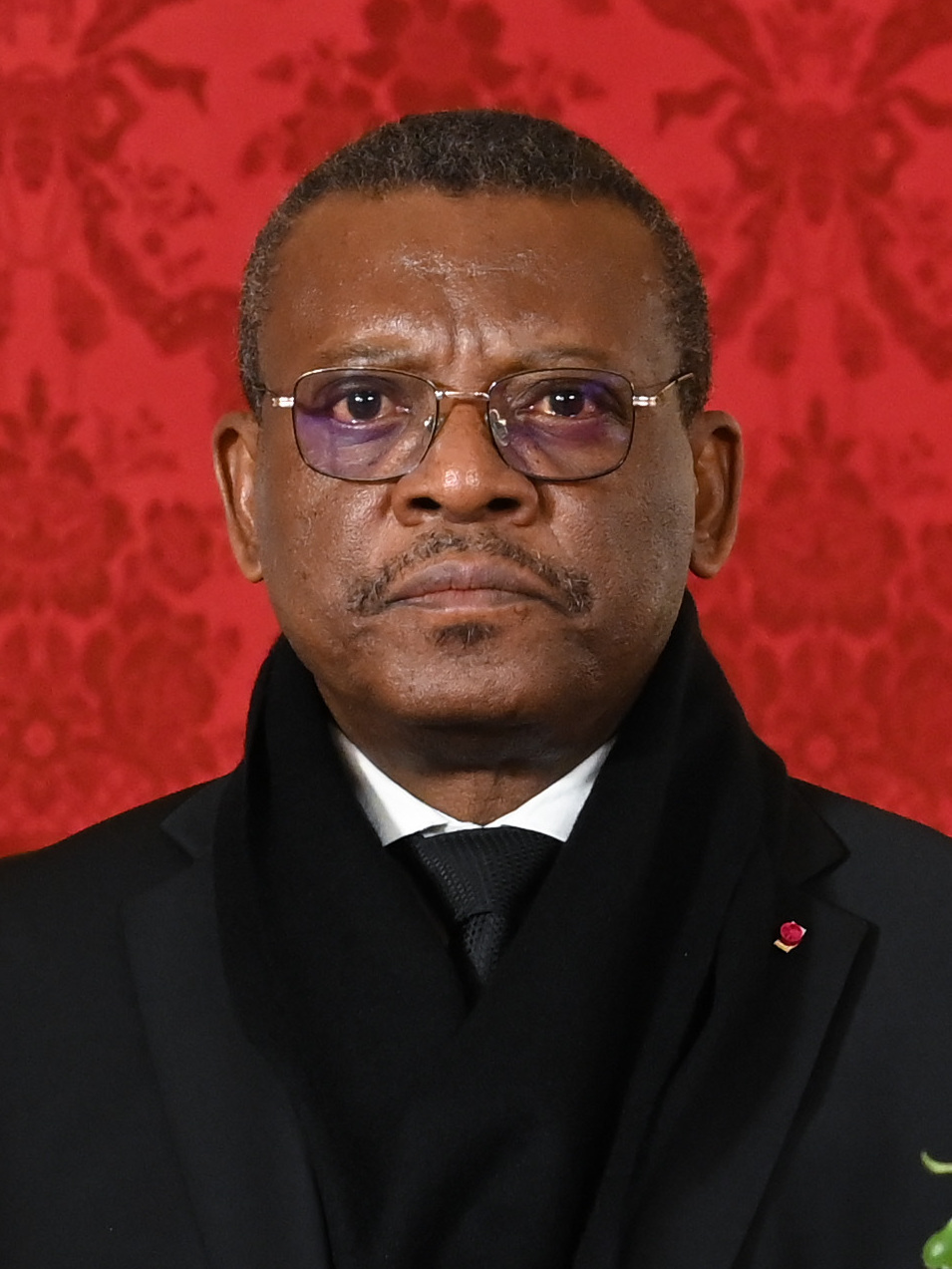
- Ngute in 2022

9th Prime Minister of Cameroon
- Incumbent
- Assumed office 4 January 2019
- President: Paul Biya
- Preceded by: Philémon Yang

Minister in Charge of Special Duties at the Presidency
- In office 2 March 2018 – 4 January 2019
- Prime Minister: Philémon Yang

Minister Delegate to the Minister of External Relations in charge of Relations with the Commonwealth
- In office 7 December 1997 – 2 March 2018
- Prime Minister: Peter Mafany Musonge; Ephraïm Inoni; Philémon Yang
- Succeeded by: Felix Mbayu

Personal details
- Born: 12 March 1954 (age 72) Bongong Barombi, British Cameroons
- Party: CPDM
- Education: University of Yaoundé I (LL.B.); Queen Mary University of London (LL.M.); University of Warwick (PhD)
- Awards: Order of Valour

Joseph Dion Ngute (born 12 March 1954) is a Cameroonian jurist and politician, serving as the 9th prime minister of Cameroon, following his appointment in January 2019. He succeeded Philémon Yang, who held the post since 2009.

== Career ==
Ngute was born in southwest Cameroon, in Bongong Barombi. From 1966 to 1971, he studied at the Government Bilingual High School of Buea, where he obtained a GCE A-Level (General Certificate of Education Advanced Level). From 1973 to 1977, he attended graduate school at the University of Yaoundé and obtained a law degree. Then, from 1977 to 1978, he enrolled at Queen Mary University of London, where he obtained a master's degree in law, and from 1978 to 1982 he followed the Ph.D. program in law at the University of Warwick in the United Kingdom.

Since 1980, he has been a professor at the University of Yaoundé II. In 1991, he served as the director of the Advanced School of Administration and Magistracy. He entered government in December 1997 as the Minister Delegate to the Minister of External Relations, a position he held until March 2018, when he was appointed Minister of Special Duties at the Presidency of the Republic.

== Prime Ministership ==
Ngute was appointed the Prime Minister of Cameroon on January 4, 2019, succeeding Philemon Yang. His appointment by President Paul Biya marked a significant change in the administration of the country, particularly in the context of the ongoing Anglophone crisis.

=== 2019: Early initiatives and Anglophone Crisis ===
Upon taking office, Ngute immediately faced the daunting task of addressing the Anglophone crisis in the North West and South West regions of Cameroon. His early initiatives included engaging in dialogue with various stakeholders and attempting to quell the separatist tensions. In September 2019, Ngute played a pivotal role in organizing the Major National Dialogue, aimed at finding a resolution to the conflict. This event brought together various factions, including political leaders, civil society, and separatist representatives, although some major separatist groups boycotted the talks. One of the outcomes of the dialogue was the proposal for greater decentralization, including the granting of special status to the North West and South West regions. This move was intended to address some of the grievances related to marginalization and governance.

=== 2020: Pandemic response and economic challenges ===
The COVID-19 pandemic posed additional challenges for Ngute's administration. The government implemented various measures to curb the spread of the virus, including lockdowns, curfews, and the suspension of large gatherings. Under Ngute, the government increased funding for healthcare, set up testing and treatment centers, and implemented public health campaigns. Despite these efforts, the healthcare system faced significant strain due to limited resources. The pandemic severely impacted Cameroon's economy, causing Ngute's government to introduce economic relief measures, including tax breaks, financial aid for businesses, and support for vulnerable populations. The administration also sought international assistance to mitigate the economic downturn.

=== 2021: Ongoing security and reforms ===
Security issues continued to dominate Ngute's tenure in 2021. The government made some progress in stabilizing the Anglophone regions, although sporadic violence persisted. Ngute supported military operations aimed at neutralizing separatist militias, while also advocating for dialogue and reconciliation. The balance between military action and negotiation remained a delicate aspect of his strategy.

The government initiated several reforms to enhance governance. These included judicial reforms to improve the legal system's efficiency and transparency, as well as electoral reforms intended to ensure fairer and more transparent elections.

=== 2022: Development projects and international relations ===
Ngute's administration focused on infrastructural development and strengthening international relations to foster economic growth. Key infrastructure projects included the expansion of the Douala Seaport, improvements in road infrastructure, and investments in energy projects. These efforts aimed at boosting economic development and addressing regional disparities. Ngute worked on improving diplomatic relations with neighboring countries and enhancing trade partnerships. His government signed several bilateral agreements aimed at boosting trade and investment.

== Personal life ==
Ngute comes from the English-speaking southwestern region of Cameroon (former Southern Cameroons) and is also a local tribal chief. He has been married several times.
