= Ephraïm Inoni =

Prime Minister of Cameroon

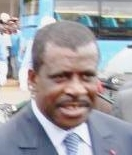
- Inoni in Yaoundé, 25 September 2006.

7th Prime Minister of Cameroon
- In office 8 December 2004 – 30 June 2009
- President: Paul Biya
- Deputy: Jean Nkuete; Ahmadu Ali
- Preceded by: Peter Mafany Musonge
- Succeeded by: Philemon Yang

Personal details
- Born: 16 August 1947 (age 78) Bakingili, Cameroon
- Party: Cameroon People's Democratic Movement

Ephraïm Inoni (born 16 August 1947) is a Cameroonian politician who was Prime Minister of Cameroon from 2004 to 2009. He was a long-time aide of President Paul Biya and is a member of the ruling Cameroon People's Democratic Movement (RDPC). He was appointed to the position of prime minister by Biya on December 8, 2004 and was sworn in that day.

== Family ==
Ephraïm Inoni was first married to Lydia Nalova Litumbe, with whom he had four children. Their marriage eventually came to an end, after which Madam Lydia Nalova relocated to the United States with the children. Following this separation, Inoni entered into a new union with Gladys Inoni, formalized at the Ephraim Ngwafor Chamber of the University of Yaounde. Madam Lydia Nalova later passed away in the United States after a prolonged battle with cancer.

== Career ==
Inoni is an Anglophone and a member of the Bakweri ethnic group. He was born in the village of Bakingili, near Limbé, in the Southwest Region of Cameroon. He was Municipal Treasurer of Douala from 1981 to 1982, then treasurer of the Cameroonian Embassy to the United States from 1982 to 1984 and Director of Account Balancing at the Ministry of Finance from 1984 to 1988. He was later named Secretary of State for Finances on April 9, 1992, and then Deputy Secretary General to the Presidency on November 27, 1992, serving in the latter position until his appointment as prime minister in December 2004.

Inoni is a member of the Central Committee of the RDPC. He was part of the campaign team for Biya's election campaign in the 2004 presidential election and was the president of the campaign's support committee in the Southwest Province.

Biya dismissed Inoni from his post as prime minister on June 30, 2009, appointing another Anglophone, Philémon Yang, to replace him. The reshuffle was the largest shakeup since Inoni's own appointment as prime minister. President Biya stated on state radio that twelve ministers were sacked (including Inoni and the defence minister), six joined and three changed places. It is thought that public anger over rising food prices and the high level of government corruption in conjunction with Biya's attempts to shore up support for the next presidential election led to the sacking, while Inoni had been in the midst of securing $140 million in aid from the International Monetary Fund, although an official explanation was not given.

Suspected of corruption during his time in office, Inoni was arrested on 16 April 2012. This arrest came as part of Operation Epevier (sparrow hawk), an anti-corruption campaign launched by President Paul Biya in 2004. This arrest was in connection with Operation Albatross, over the purchase at great expense in 2003 of the presidential aircraft, which turned out to have serious flaws on its maiden flight with the presidential couple from the Douala International airport to Paris in 2004. He was one of a number of high-level officials arrested during the course of a crackdown on corruption.

Ephraim Inoni has been under interrogation behind closed doors by examining magistrates as part of the judicial process in the case popularly known in Cameroon as the "Albatross Affair". He was placed under pre-trial detention by the Mfoundi High Court in Yaounde. As of June 2024 at least, Mr. Ephraïm Inoni's whereabouts are currently unknown.

An early biographical sketch is given in Njeuma 1999.

Political offices
Preceded by Peter Mafany Musonge	Prime Minister of Cameroon; 2004–2009	Succeeded by Philémon Yang
