= Prime Minister of Cameroon =

Political position

Prime Minister of the Republic of Cameroon
- Coat of arms of Cameroon

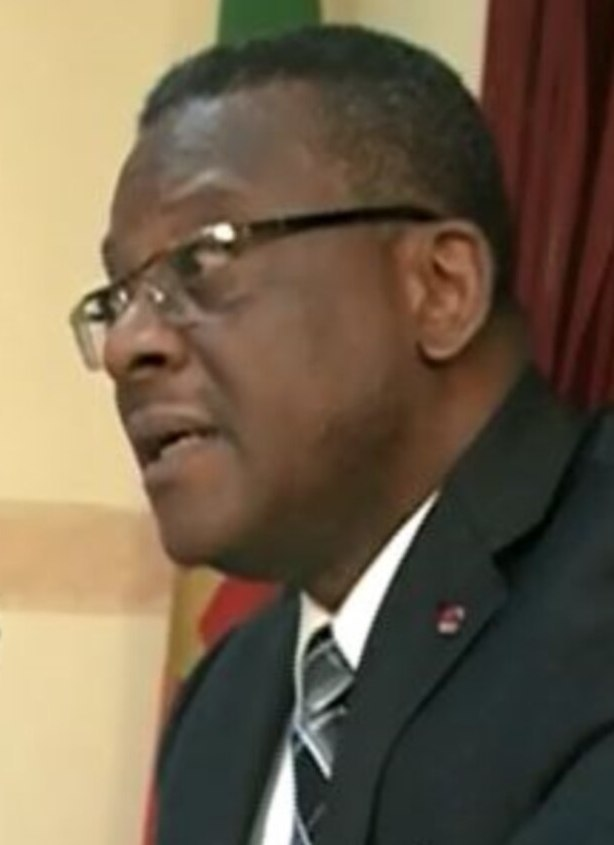
- Incumbent; Joseph Ngute since 4 January 2019
- Appointer: Paul Biya, as President of Cameroon
- Inaugural holder: Ahmadou Ahidjo
- Formation: 1 January 1960
- Website: Official Website

Under the current Constitution of Cameroon, the prime minister of Cameroon is a relatively powerless position. While the prime minister is officially appointed to be the head of government, the president retains most of the executive power and can fire the prime minister at will.

The current prime minister, Joseph Ngute, was appointed by President Paul Biya. He took the office on 4 January 2019.

== History ==
The position has existed in the eastern part of Cameroon since it gained its independence from France in 1960. When the western part gained independence from the British in 1961, the two halves of the Federal Republic of Cameroon, East Cameroon and West Cameroon, maintained their autonomy and each had a separate prime minister. In 1972, Cameroon became a unitary state and the position of prime minister was temporarily unfilled. In 1975, Paul Biya was appointed prime minister for all of Cameroon. After Biya's succession to the presidency, the post of prime minister did not exist from 1984 to 1991.

== See also ==
- Politics of Cameroon
