= Philémon Yang =

Prime Minister of Cameroon from 2009 to 2019

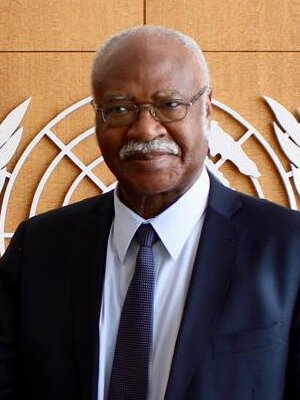
- Yang in 2025

President of the 79th UN General Assembly
- In office 10 September 2024 – 9 September 2025
- Preceded by: Dennis Francis
- Succeeded by: Annalena Baerbock

8th Prime Minister of Cameroon
- In office 30 June 2009 – 4 January 2019
- President: Paul Biya
- Preceded by: Ephraïm Inoni
- Succeeded by: Joseph Ngute

Personal details
- Born: 14 June 1947 (age 79) Jikejem, Oku, British Cameroon (now Cameroon)
- Party: CPDM
- Education: University of Yaoundé; University of Ottawa

Philémon Yunji Yang (born 14 June 1947) is a Cameroonian politician who served as Prime Minister of Cameroon from 2009 to 2019, having previously held various ministerial and diplomatic roles particularly in Canada where he served as the ambassador of Cameroon to Canada for over 20 years. He is the longest-serving prime minister in Cameroonian history, having served 9 years, 9 months, and 3 days. From 2024 to 2025 he served as President of the United Nations General Assembly for its seventy-ninth session.

== Early life and education ==
Yang was born in Jikejem-Oku, in the Oku subdivision of the Bui division of the Northwest Region of Cameroon. He studied law at the University of Yaoundé.

== Career ==
=== Early appointments ===
Yang served as a prosecutor at the Buea court of appeal before being appointed to the government in 1975 as Deputy Minister of Territorial Administration. In 1979 he became Minister of Mines and Energy, remaining in that position until he was dismissed from the government in 1984.

=== Ambassador and High Commissioner in Canada ===
Yang served as Ambassador to Canada from 1984 to 1995 − and as High Commissioner in Canada from 1995 to 2004, after Cameroon joined the Commonwealth of Nations. He also served as Dean of the Diplomatic Corps in Canada for about 10 years. His time in Ottawa was dedicated to securing foreign aid for his country, despite Canadian concerns about human rights abuses and corruption. Along with other representatives of African countries, he was pleased by Canada's commitment to debt relief in 2000. He headed Cameroon's delegation in negotiations on the Cartagena Protocol on Biosafety from 1998 to 2000, and after the Protocol was adopted he chaired the Intergovernmental Committee for the Cartagena Protocol.

=== Return to domestic politics ===
In 2004 Yang was appointed Assistant Secretary-General of the Presidency of Cameroon. In 2008 he became chair of the board of directors of the Cameroon Airlines Corporation.

=== Prime Minister of Cameroon ===
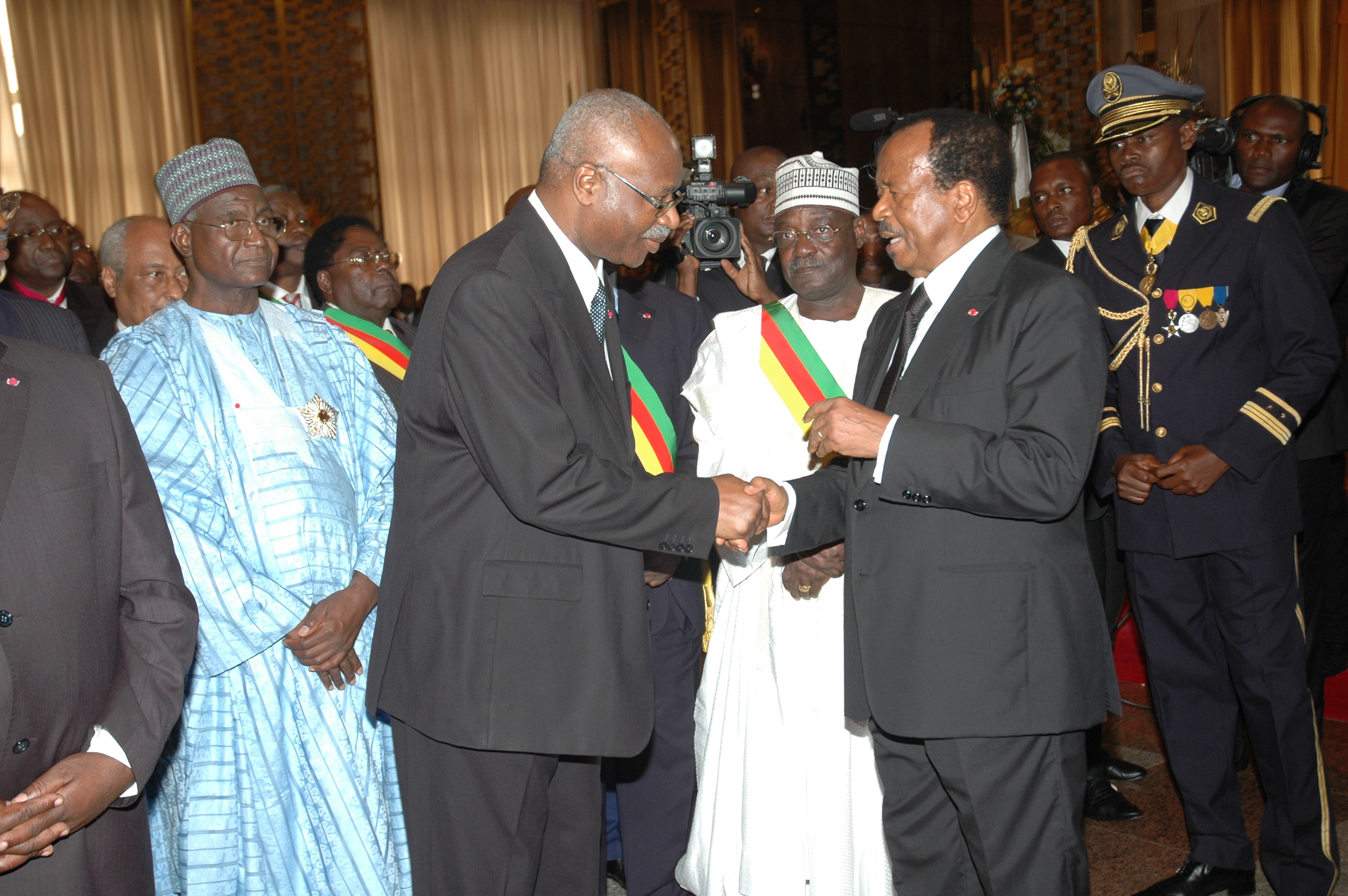
Philémon Yang shaking hands with President Paul Biya in 2012.

On 30 June 2009 President Paul Biya appointed Yang as Prime Minister of Cameroon, replacing Ephraïm Inoni. Yang's appointment marked the largest government shake-up since his predecessor was appointed in 2004. Biya stated on state radio that three ministers from the previous government had switched places, six new names were added while six portfolios were cut entirely. The opposition said that it did not expect a great deal of change due in part to the continuance of a large government. It had been hoping for 30 ministerial positions to be cut, but there remained over 60 ministers. The reshuffle was believed to have been spurred by public anger over rising food prices and discontent with high levels of government corruption. Adding to this, the move was seen as an attempt by Biya to shore up support for the next presidential election in 2011. In addition to Yang, new ministers were appointed for defence, posts and telecommunications, communication, education, promotion of women, water and energy, and sports.

Yang stepped down as Prime Minister on 4 January 2019.

=== President of the United Nations General Assembly ===
On 6 June 2024 Yang was elected to serve as President of the United Nations General Assembly for its seventy-ninth session, from 10 September 2024 to 9 September 2025.

Diplomatic posts
Preceded by Dennis Francis	President of the United Nations General Assembly; 2024–2025	Succeeded by Annalena Baerbock
Political offices
Preceded by Ephraïm Inoni	Prime Minister of Cameroon; 2009–2019	Succeeded by Joseph Ngute
