= 2026 in Cameroon =

- Decades: 2000s; 2010s; 2020s
- See also: Other events of 2026; List of years in Cameroon

Events in the year 2026 in Cameroon.

== Incumbents ==
- President: Paul Biya
- Prime Minister: Joseph Ngute

== Events ==
=== January ===
- 14 January – At least 15 people are killed in an attack by gunmen on the settlement of Gidado in Ndu, Northwest Region.

=== February ===
- 3 February – Cameroon and Equatorial Guinea sign an agreement to jointly extract natural gas from the Yoyo-Yolanda field.
- 17 February – A freelance journalist on assignment for the Associated Press is assaulted by police and briefly detained alongside three other reporters and a lawyer in Yaoundé, while attempting to report on African migrants recently deported from the United States.
- 19 February – A court-martial in Yaounde convicts three soldiers for their role in the killing of 21 civilians in the Ngarbuh massacre in 2020 and sentences them to up to 10 years' imprisonment.

=== March ===
- 4 March – The United Kingdom suspends the issuance of student visas to Cameroonian nationals as part of efforts to reduce asylum requests.
- 17 March – Théodore Datouo is elected as president of the National Assembly, replacing Cavaye Yeguié Djibril after 34 years.
- 19 March – The National Assembly votes to extend its mandate and postpone legislative elections until 20 December.

=== April ===
- 4 April – Parliament approves a constitutional amendment to reintroduce the position of vice president, allowing the appointee to automatically succeed President Biya in the event of death, resignation, or incapacity.
- 15 April – Pope Leo XIV arrives in Cameroon for a three-day visit.

=== August ===
- 16 August – Cameroon wins the Women's Africa Cup of Nations for the first time, defeating Malawi 3–0 in the final in Rabat, Morocco.

=== September ===
- 17 September – Fifteen people are killed in an attack by Islamist militants on Madegoua village near Makary, Far North Region.

=== November ===
- 2 November – An explosion at the Metafrique Steel iron smelting plant in an industrial park in Douala kills at least four people, and severely burns 16 others.

=== Scheduled ===
- 2026 Cameroonian parliamentary election

== Deaths ==
- 16 February – Consty Eka, 56, television presenter and businessman
- 11 April – Marcel Niat Njifenji, 91, president of the senate (2013–2026) and mayor of Bangangté (2002–2007)
- 23 April – Jean Pierre Biyiti bi Essam, 76, politician and diplomat, ambassador to Israel (2018–2026).
- 4 May – Alexis Dipanda Mouelle, 84, president of the supreme court (1990–2014).
- 6 May – Cavayé Yéguié Djibril, 84, president of the National Assembly (1992–2026).
- 9 May – Philippe Mpay, 86–87, major general of the Cameroon Armed Forces
- 12 May – Bassek Ba Kobhio, 69-70, filmmaker, writer and founder of the Écrans Noirs Festival
- 13 May – Hamad Kalkaba Malboum, 75, athletics official, president of the Confederation of African Athletics (since 2003).
- 4 October – Clément Atangana, 85, magistrate, counsellor of the supreme court (1991–2014).
- 11 November – Hamadou Moustapha, 81, politician.
