= 2021 in Cameroon =

- Decades: 2000s; 2010s; 2020s
- See also: Other events of 2021; List of years in Cameroon

Events in the year 2021 in Cameroon.

== Incumbents ==
- President: Paul Biya
- Prime Minister: Joseph Ngute

== Events ==
Ongoing — COVID-19 pandemic in Cameroon

- 1 January – The United States Senate passes a strong resolution calling for a mediated solution to the armed conflict and independence movement of Ambazonia.
- 16 January–7 February — 2020 African Nations Championship, hosted by Cameroon – originally scheduled in 2020 but postponed due to the COVID-19 pandemic.
- 18–24 February —Football at the 2020 Summer Olympics – Women's qualification (CAF–CONMEBOL play-off), Cameroon 1 vs. Chile 2.
- 27 January – Fifty-three people are killed and 21 injured in a collision and fire between a bus and a truck in Santchou, West Region.
- 8 March – Maximilienne C. Ngo Mbe, human rights activist, is awarded the International Women of Courage Award.

== Sports ==
- March 30 – Francis Ngannou wins the UFC heavyweight title.

== Culture ==
- June 12 – Four films made in Cameroon are now available for streaming on Netflix in the United States. The Fisherman's Diary has won numerous awards and was pre-selected for the 2021 Academy Awards.

== Deaths ==
- February 3 – Norbert Owona, 70, footballer (Union Douala, national team).
- February 21 – Bernard Njonga, 65, activist and politician.
- February 27 – Pascal Monkam, 90, businessman.
- April 2 – Christian Wiyghan Tumi, 90, Roman Catholic cardinal.
- April 9
  - Gervais Mendo Ze, 76, linguist and academic.
  - Rabiatou Njoya, 75, writer and Bamun advisor.
  - Martin Aristide Okouda, 69, politician.
- April 10
  - Guillaume Oyônô Mbia, 82, writer.
  - Victor Mukete, 102, politician and traditional chief, senator (since 1959).

== See also ==
- COVID-19 pandemic in Africa
- African Continental Free Trade Area
- 2019 Ambazonian leadership crisis
