= 2012 in Cameroon =

- Decades: 1990s; 2000s; 2010s; 2020s
- See also: Other events of 2012; List of years in Cameroon

This article lists events from the year 2012 in Cameroon.

== Incumbents ==
- President: Paul Biya
- Prime Minister: Philémon Yang

== Events ==
- 20 February – Three women are charged with homosexuality, becoming the first such case in Cameroon to involve women.
- 9 August – Bakassi conflict: separatist militants affiliated with the Bakassi Movement for Self-Determination (BAMOSD) in the Bakassi Peninsula declare independence.
- 14 August – Cameroon joins the Kimberley Process Certification Scheme, an international certification for rough diamonds that aims to prevent the trade of blood diamonds.
- August–September – Flooding caused by a month of heavy rainfall in the Far North Region leaves nearly 30 people dead and displaces at least 4,000.
- 16 August – Bakassi conflict: BAMOSD abducts two Cameroonians and demands F.CFA100 million (€152,000) for their release.
- 3 October – Symphorian Sangha, a prolific ivory poacher and trader, is arrested in the town of Yokadouma by the local gendarmerie.
- 4 October – The Yaoundé High Court sentences businessman Michel Thierry Atangana and former secretary-general of the presidency Titus Edzoa to 20 years in prison. The two were held in detention since 1997 under accusations of embezzlement.
- c. 10 October – Addax Petroleum's exploratory Paduk-1X well strikes oil off the coast of Cameroon.
- 6 November – Opposition demonstrators in Yaoundé are dispersed by security forces with teargas.
- 14 November – Four environmentalist activists protesting the construction of the 70,000 ha (170,000 acres) Herakles plantation are arrested in the town of Mundemba. They are granted a conditional release on 18 November.

== Deaths ==
- 15 November – Théophile Abega, 58, football player and politician

== Links ==
Media related to 2012 in Cameroon at Wikimedia Commons
