= 2022 in Cameroon =

- Decades: 2000s; 2010s; 2020s
- See also: Other events of 2022; List of years in Cameroon

Events in the year 2022 in Cameroon.

== Incumbents ==
- President: Paul Biya
- Prime Minister: Joseph Ngute

== Events ==
Ongoing — COVID-19 pandemic in Cameroon

- 23 January – Yaoundé nightclub fire: At least 16 people are killed and eight others are injured in a fire caused by fireworks at a nightclub in Yaoundé.
- 24 January - Yaoundé stadium disaster: Eight people are killed in a crowd crush at Olembe Stadium in Yaoundé.
- 6 February - 2021 Africa Cup of Nations: In association football, Senegal win their first international trophy after beating Egypt on penalties in the final at the Olembe Stadium in Yaoundé, Cameroon. Senegalese forward Sadio Mané is named the tournament's Best Player.
- 2 March - Anglophone rebels bomb a car in the Ekondo-Titi commune of Southwest Cameroon, killing seven people, including the mayor and a lieutenant.
- 14 March - Cameroon bans shisha smoking, becoming the sixth African country to do so.
- 12 April - Jeune Afrique reveals that the defence ministers of Russia and Cameroon sign a new military cooperation agreement, renewing a similar agreement signed in 2015.
- 11 May - Eleven people are killed when a plane carrying Cameroon Oil Transportation Company workers crashes near Nanga Eboko.
- 29 May - Twenty-four people are killed and more than 60 injured in an attack by Anglophone rebels in Cameroon.
- 7 June - Five Cameroonian soldiers are killed in an attack by Ambazonian separatists in Kouoptamo district.
- 22 June - Anglophone Ambazonia rebels kill between 26 and 32 civilians in Akwaya, Cameroon.
- 25 June - Akwaya massacre: Twenty-six people are killed in an attack in Akwaya district, Southwest region, Cameroon.
- 9 August - Four civilians and a soldier are killed, and another civilian is wounded, during three separate attacks by Boko Haram gunmen in the Far North Region, Cameroon.
- 6 September - Six people are killed and eight others are injured when separatists open fire on a public bus in South West, Cameroon.

== Deaths ==
- May 21 – Fon Angwafo III of Mankon, 97, traditional ruler
- May 31 - Jacques N'Guea, 66, footballer
- June 21 - Pierre Narcisse, 45, singer
- July 2 - Félix Tonye Mbog, 88, politician
- July 12 - Lekeaka Oliver, 53, separatist leader
- August 9 - Dakolé Daïssala, politician

== See also ==
- COVID-19 pandemic in Africa
- African Continental Free Trade Area
