= 2023 in Cameroon =

- Decades: 2000s; 2010s; 2020s
- See also: Other events of 2023; List of years in Cameroon

Events in the year 2023 in Cameroon.

== Incumbents ==
- President: Paul Biya
- Prime Minister: Joseph Ngute

== Events ==
- 22 January – Police in Cameroon find the mutilated body of prominent journalist Martinez Zogo who had been kidnapped by unknown assailants five days ago, amid increasing violence against reporters in the country.
- 25 February – Nineteen athletes are injured by small explosions during the Mount Cameroon Race of Hope in Buea, Southwest Region. The Ambazonia Defence Forces claim responsibility for the incident.
- 30 May – Four people are killed after armed men attack a checkpoint in Mora, Far North Region.
- 17 June – At least ten people are killed during an offensive by the military of Cameroon against separatists in the English-speaking Northwest Region.
- 17 July – Gunmen kill 10 people and injure two at a busy junction in Bamenda.
- 7 September – Several people are killed after armed militants attack vehicles in Muea, a village in the Southwest Region.
- 8 October – At least 30 people are killed during landslides caused by heavy rains in Yaoundé.
- 23 October – Authorities in Touboro, North Region confirm that over 30 people, likely including students from Chad, were abducted by suspected bandits yesterday.
- 6 November – Egbekaw massacre: At least 20 people are killed and 10 others are seriously injured after separatist rebel groups attack a village in Mamfe, Manyu.

== Deaths ==
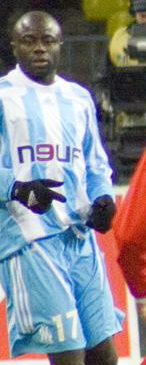
Modeste M'bami

- 3 January – Armand Joel Banaken Bassoken, footballer (born 1983).
- 7 January – Modeste M'bami, footballer (born 1982).
- 17 January – Martinez Zogo, journalist.
- 21 January – Gabriel Dodo Ndoke, politician (born 1971).
- 31 January – General Transporter, Ambazonian rebel leader.
- 12 March – Alphonse Beni, 77, actor and film director.
- 17 March – Jean-Bernard Ndongo Essomba, politician, MP (1992–1997, since 2002).
- 15 May – Essambo Ewane, 70, Olympic judoka (1980, 1984).
- 11 June – John Nkemngong Nkengasong, 64, playwright, novelist, and poet.
- 12 June – John Fru Ndi, politician (born 1941).
- 23 June – Manamourou Silikam, 49, politician, MP (since 2020).
- 24 July – Rose Zang Nguele, 76, politician, MP (1992–1997).
- 16 November – Hubert Mono Ndjana, 77, academic and philosopher.

== See also ==
- Timeline of the Anglophone Crisis (2023)
