= CJT =

CJT may refer to:

- Cargojet, the TSX code CJT
- Condorcet's jury theorem, a political science theorem
- Cilejit railway station, the station code CJT
- Collège Jean-Tabi, a private Catholic secondary school located in Yaoundé
