= 2016 in Cameroon =

- Decades: 1990s; 2000s; 2010s; 2020s
- See also: Other events of 2016; List of years in Cameroon

This article lists events from the year 2016 in Cameroon.

== Incumbents ==
- President: Paul Biya
- Prime Minister: Philémon Yang

== Events ==
=== January ===
- 13 January – Boko Haram insurgency:
  - At least 10 are killed in a suspected Boko Haram attack on a mosque in the town of Kolofata.
  - 12 are killed in a suspected Boko Haram suicide bombing at a mosque in the town of Kouyape.
- 18 January – Boko Haram insurgency: Four worshippers are killed following a suicide bombing targeting a mosque in the village of Nguetchewe.
- 25 January – Boko Haram insurgency: At least 28 are killed and 65 wounded in a series of suicide bombing attacks targeting the village of Bodo in the Far North Region.

=== February ===
- 10 February – Boko Haram insurgency: At least 10 are killed in two suicide bombings at the village of Ngechewe.
- 19 February – At least 22 people are killed in two suicide bombings targeting the market and a nearby school in the village of Meme.

=== March ===
- 13 March – Demonstrations are held in Douala after a Monique Kumate, pregnant with twins, dies in a hospital due to reported staff neglect.
- 31 March – Boko Haram insurgency: The Cameroon Armed Forces, in coordination with the Nigerian Armed Forces, announce the launch of Operation Tentacle against Boko Haram strongholds in Nigeria near the Cameroonian border.

=== April ===
- 18 April – Birwe Toussem, a seven-year-old boy, is hit and killed by an armoured jeep in the motorcade of UN ambassador Samantha Power near the city of Mokolo. Power met with Toussem's parents and expressed her condolences. Toussem's family is later compensated with F.CFA6 million (about US$10,000), alongside cows, food, and supplies from the United States and the Cameroonian government in June 2016.
- 19 April – Authorities burn 2,000 seized elephant tusks as part of operations to combat the illicit ivory trade.

=== May ===
- 14 May – Boko Haram insurgency: The Cameroonian government announces that five Boko Haram leaders were arrested and at least 48 captives freed during anti-insurgency operations in Madawaya forest.
- 26 May – The Cameroonian government announces the reappearance of the H5N1 Influenza virus in the country, reporting that at least 15,000 birds have been killed by the virus since 22 May.

=== June ===
- 29 June – Boko Haram insurgency: At least 11 are killed in a suicide bombing carried out by Boko Haram in Djakana.

=== August ===
- 21 August – Boko Haram insurgency: Three people are killed and several are injured after a suicide bombing targeting the market in the village of Mora.

=== October ===
- 21 October – A Camrail intercity passenger train derails and crashes in Eséka, killing at least 79 with a further 550 injured.

=== November ===
- 22 November – 2016–17 Cameroonian protests:
  - A sit-in strike is declared for teachers and students in the Southwest and Northwest Regions.
  - Clashes break out between protestors and security forces in the city of Bamenda, leaving four dead.
- c. 29 November – Strikes in the Anglophone regions expand to schools and universities.

=== December ===
- 8 December – 2016–17 Cameroonian protests: four people are killed in Bamenda after security forces fire tear gas and live rounds into a crowd of protestors blocking a CPDM party meeting.

== Deaths ==
- 6 May – Patrick Ekeng, 26, professional footballer
- 8 May – Jeanine Christelle Djomnang, 22, professional footballer
- 24 May – Anne Marie Nzie, 84, Bikutsi singer

== Links ==
Media related to 2016 in Cameroon at Wikimedia Commons
