= Atangana =

Atangana is a surname. Notable people with the surname include:

- Charles Atangana (circa 1880–1943), Cameroonian traditional ruler
- Marie-Thérèse Catherine Atangana Assiga Ahanda, (c. 1941–2014), Cameroonian novelist and chemist
- Jean-Marie Atangana Mebara (born 1954), Cameroonian politician
- Michel Thierry Atangana (born 1964), French citizen of Cameroonian origin
- Mvondo Atangana (born 1979), Cameroonian footballer
