= 2018 in Cameroon =

- Decades: 1990s; 2000s; 2010s; 2020s
- See also: Other events of 2018; List of years in Cameroon

Events in the year 2018 in Cameroon.

== Incumbents ==
- President: Paul Biya
- Prime Minister: Philémon Yang

== Events ==
- Cameroonian presidential election, 2018

== Deaths ==
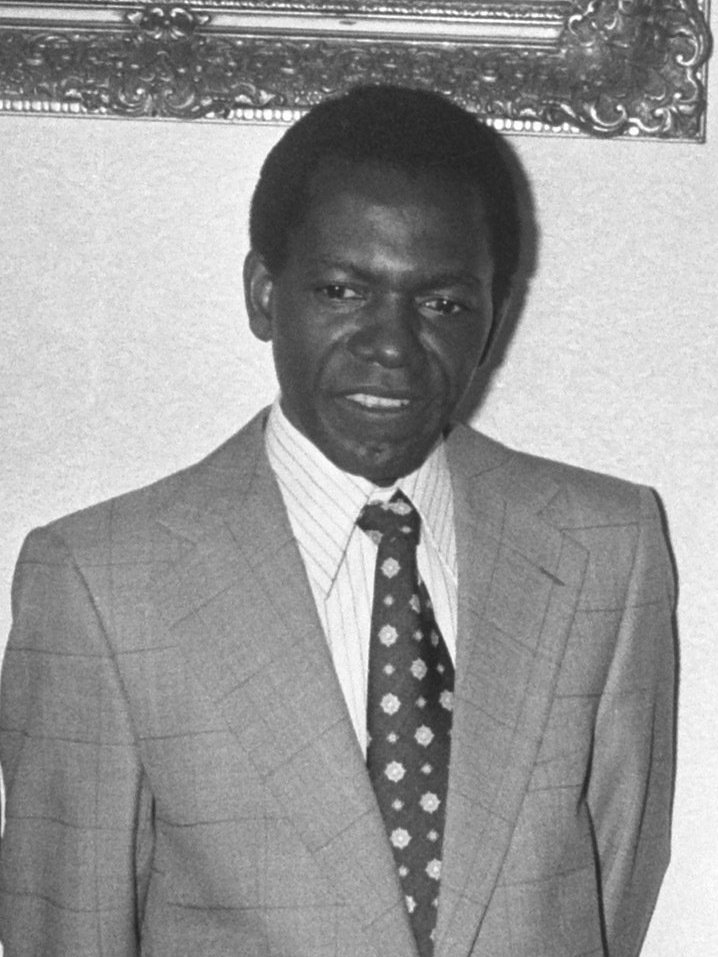
Fabien Eboussi Boulaga

- 2 April – Elie Onana, footballer (b. 1951).
- 13 October – Fabien Eboussi Boulaga, philosopher (b. 1934).
