= Gidado =

- Language: Fulfulde

Origin
- Meaning: 'Beloved'
- Region of origin: West Africa

Gidado (Fula: Giɗaaɗo,) is a Fulfulde name, common among the Eastern Fulbe in Cameroon, Niger, and Nigeria. It means 'beloved', derived from the root yiɗi, which means 'to love', and the suffix -ɗo, which signifies the human agent of an action.

Notable people with the name include:

== Given name ==
- Gidado dan Laima (1817–1842), first known Waziri of the Sokoto Caliphate, now in Nigeria
- Gidado Idris (1935–2017), Nigerian civil servant

== Middle name ==
- Aishatu Gidado Idris (born 1960), Nigerian author

== Surname ==
- Nuhu Gidado (born 1958), Nigerian politician
- Saratu Gidado (1968–2024), Nigerian actress
- Victor Gidado (born 2004), Nigerian footballer
