= 2020 in Cameroon =

- Decades: 2000s; 2010s; 2020s
- See also: Other events of 2020; List of years in Cameroon

== Incumbents ==
- President: Paul Biya
- Prime Minister: Joseph Ngute

== Events ==
- February 9 – 2020 Cameroonian parliamentary election and 2020 Cameroonian municipal elections
- February 14 – Anglophone Crisis: Ngarbuh massacre
- August 2 – Boko Haram insurgency: Nguetchewe attack
- October 24 - Anglophone Crisis: Kumba school massacre
- December 27 – Thirty-seven are killed and 18 are injured in a bus crash in Nemale.

== Deaths ==
- April 12 – Samuel Wembé
- July 5 – Samuel Wazizi, journalist (CMTV); died while in government retention.
- July 10 – Jacob Plange-Rhule, doctor, head of district hospital in Yaounde; COVID-19
