= Jean-Tabi College =

Coordinates: 3.9180°N 11.5255°E

Jean-Tabi College Collège Jean-Tabi

Location
- Yaoundé, Cameroon; Cameroon

Information
- Type: Private Catholic secondary school
- Religious affiliation(s): Roman Catholic
- Established: 1956
- Oversight: Congregation of the Sisters Servants of the Holy Heart of Mary

Jean-Tabi College (CJT) is a private Catholic secondary school located in Yaoundé, the capital of Cameroon.

== History ==
Founded in 1956 by the pastors and parishioners of the Etoudi parish in memory of Father Jean Tabi (1908–1951), the college became a diocesan institution in 1971. Since 1975, it has been managed by the congregation of the Sisters Servants of the Holy Heart of Mary (SSCM).

== Organization ==
Jean-Tabi College offers classes from 6th grade to Terminale (12th grade) and welcomes students of all religions, provided they agree to adhere to the school's Catholic and ecological principles.

== Achievements ==
Jean-Tabi College is one of the schools with the highest success rates in the Baccalauréat in Cameroon. It achieved the highest success rate in the Baccalauréat in 2007 and regularly tops the annual ranking of high schools and colleges established by the Cameroon Baccalaureate Office (OBC).

It has also ranked first nationally since 2013, and achieved a 100% pass rate in all exams (Baccalauréat, Probatoire, BEPC) during the 2018 and 2019 sessions.

== See also ==
- Collège de la Retraite
