= 1994 in Cameroon =

- Decades: 1970s; 1980s; 1990s; 2000s; 2010s
- See also: Other events of 1994; List of years in Cameroon

Events in the year 1994 in Cameroon.

== Incumbents ==
- President – Paul Biya
- Prime Minister – Simon Achidi Achu

== Births ==
- 3 January – Ayuk Otay Arrey Sophina, judoka
- 13 January – Maxime Yegnong, boxer
- 16 March – Joel Embiid, basketball player
