= 1991 in Cameroon =

- Decades: 1970s; 1980s; 1990s; 2000s; 2010s
- See also: Other events of 1991; List of years in Cameroon

Events in the year 1991 in Cameroon.

== Incumbents ==
- President – Paul Biya
- Prime Minister – Post abolished until 26 April, then Sadou Hayatou

== Events ==
- 26 April – Sadou Hayatou becomes Prime Minister.
- Doual'art, a nonprofit arts organisation and research centre is established in Douala.

== Births ==
- 28 May – Marie Fegue, weightlifter
- 20 November – Yvonne Leuko, footballer
