= 2017 in Cameroon =

- Decades: 1990s; 2000s; 2010s; 2020s
- See also: Other events of 2017; List of years in Cameroon

This article lists events from the year 2017 in Cameroon.

== Incumbents ==
- President: Paul Biya
- Prime Minister: Philémon Yang

== Events ==
- 22 September –
  - Cameroonian security forces open fire on Anglophone protesters, killing at least five people.
  - In Ekok, around 700 protesters attack police stations and raise the Ambazonian flag.
- 1 October –The Ambazonian separatist movement unilaterally declares the independence of Ambazonia. Tens of thousands protest; with at least 20 demonstrators killed by security forces in Buea and Bamenda.
- 8 November – The Ambazonia Defence Forces kill two or three gendarmes in Bamenda in a significant escalation of violence. The attack is condemned by the Interim Government of Ambazonia.
- 4 December – The Cameroonian government officially declares war on the Ambazonia separatists, calling them "terrorists who seek secession", marking a formal military response to the uprising.
- 14 December –
  - An elite Cameroonian army unit launches an operation to retake separatist-controlled villages.
  - Soldiers fire indiscriminately at civilians in Bodam, execute an elderly man, and burn several houses.

== Deaths ==
- 8 January – Zacharie Noah, footballer (b. 1937).

== Links ==
Media related to 2017 in Cameroon at Wikimedia Commons
