= Court of Appeal of Cameroon =

The Courts of Appeal are appellate courts in Cameroon. They are defined in Part V of the constitution of Cameroon as being under the Supreme Court.
