= 1985 in Cameroon =

- Decades: 1960s; 1970s; 1980s; 1990s; 2000s
- See also: Other events of 1985; List of years in Cameroon

Events in the year 1985 in Cameroon.

== Incumbents ==
- President – Paul Biya

== Events ==
- The Cameroon National Union changes its name to the Cameroon People's Democratic Movement.

== Births ==
- 4 March – Annabelle Ali, wrestler
- 16 July – Rebecca Muambo, wrestler
