= Clément Atangana =

Cameroonian magistrate (1941–2026)

President of the Constitutional Council of Cameroon
- In office 7 February 2018 – 4 October 2026
- Preceded by: position established
- Succeeded by: TBD

Counsellor of the Supreme Court of Cameroon
- In office 1991–2014

Personal details
- Born: 20 September 1941 Ekoumeyeck, French Cameroon
- Died: 4 October 2026 (aged 85) Paris, France
- Education: University of Yaoundé; National School of Administration and Magistracy; Institut international d'administration publique
- Occupation: Magistrate

Clément Atangana (20 September 1941 – 4 October 2026) was a Cameroonian magistrate.

== Life and career ==
Born in Ekoumeyeck on 20 September 1941, Atangana earned a licentiate in private law from the University of Yaoundé. He also held degrees from the National School of Administration and Magistracy and the Institut international d'administration publique. He became a judge on 20 December 1968. He served on various tribunals before his nomination to the Supreme Court in 1991 as a counsellor, where he served until his retirement in 2014. On 7 February 2018, he became the first president of Cameroon's Constitutional Council.

Atangana died in Paris on 4 October 2026, at the age of 85.
