= 1995 in Cameroon =

- Decades: 1970s; 1980s; 1990s; 2000s; 2010s
- See also: Other events of 1995; List of years in Cameroon

Events in the year 1995 in Cameroon.

== Incumbents ==
- President – Paul Biya
- Prime Minister – Simon Achidi Achu

== Events ==
- 3 December – Cameroon Airlines Flight 3701 crashes, killing 71 people.

== Births ==
- 19 May – Berthe Etane Ngolle, wrestler
