= 1993 in Cameroon =

- Decades: 1970s; 1980s; 1990s; 2000s; 2010s
- See also: Other events of 1993; List of years in Cameroon

Events in the year 1993 in Cameroon.

== Incumbents ==
- President – Paul Biya
- Prime Minister – Simon Achidi Achu

== Events ==
- The University of Yaoundé is split into the University of Yaoundé I and the University of Yaoundé II.

== Births ==
- 16 July – Junior Ngadja Nyabeyeu, weightlifter
- 17 August – Emmanuel Eseme, sprinter
