= Alexis Dipanda Mouelle =

Cameroonian magistrate (1942–2026)

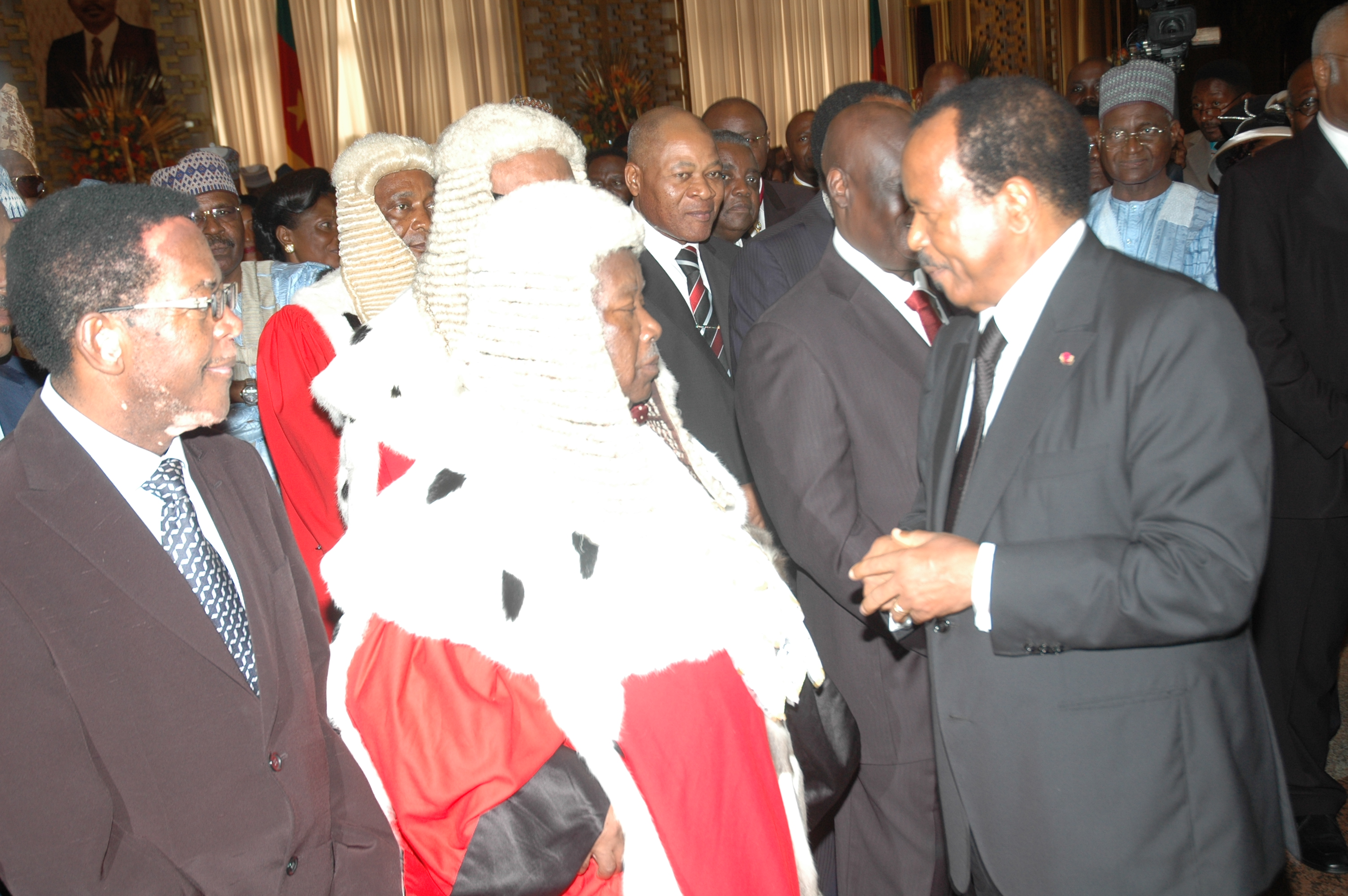
- Dipanda Mouelle (middle) with President Paul Biya (right) in 2012

President of the Supreme Court of Cameroon
- In office 30 May 1990 – 18 December 2014
- Preceded by: Rémy Jean Mbaya
- Succeeded by: Daniel Mekobe Sone

Personal details
- Born: 25 March 1942 Bonaléa, French Cameroon
- Died: 4 May 2026 (aged 84) Douala, Cameroon
- Education: Federal University of Yaoundé (Lic.); University of Paris (DES, DEA)
- Occupation: Magistrate

Alexis Dipanda Mouelle (25 March 1942 – 4 May 2026) was a Cameroonian magistrate.

== Life and career ==
Born in Bonaléa on 25 March 1942, Dipanda Mouelle earned a licentiate in law from the Federal University of Yaoundé before earning a Diplôme d'études supérieures and a Diplôme d'études approfondies from the University of Paris. He was appointed a judge on 29 November 1965. On 14 August 1971, he was appointed president of the Court of First Instance of Foumban and subsequently Head of the Judicial Professions Service within the Directorate of Judicial Services Oversight at the Ministry of Justice in October 1972.

In December 1986, Dipanda Mouelle joined the Supreme Court, of which he was nominated president on 30 May 1990. He was responsible for the certification of the 1992 presidential election despite accusations of fraud. In 2014, he retired from the Court in a decree by President Paul Biya. He was replaced by Daniel Mekobe Sone. In addition to his work in Cameroon, he chaired the 17th session of the United Nations Committee Against Torture and was a member of the International Court of Arbitration.

Dipanda Mouelle died in Douala on 4 May 2026, at the age of 84.

== Works ==
- La torture, cette barbarie de l'humanité (1998)
