= 2014 in Cameroon =

- Decades: 1990s; 2000s; 2010s; 2020s
- See also: Other events of 2014; List of years in Cameroon

The following lists events that happened during 2014 in Cameroon.

== Incumbents ==
- President: Paul Biya
- Prime Minister: Philémon Yang

== Events ==
=== February ===
- 16 February - Suspected Islamist militants kill 90 people in a Nigerian village raid near the border with Cameroon.

=== April ===
- 5 April - Two Italian priests and a Canadian nun have been kidnapped by gunmen in Cameroon.

=== May ===
- 17 May - Nigeria, Niger, Cameroon, Benin, and Chad join to combat Boko Haram.

=== June ===
- 1 June - The two Italian priests and a Canadian nun kidnapped by suspected Boko Haram gunmen have been released.

=== December ===
- 28 December - The militant organisation Boko Haram attacks a village in Northern Cameroon, leaving an estimated 30 dead.
- 29 December - Cameroon launches its first airstrikes against Boko Haram in a successful operation to reclaim several villages and a military base briefly seized by the militant group in the Far North Region.
