= Bernard Njonga =

Cameroonian activist and politician (1955–2021)

- Born: 18 October 1955; Bangoua, French Cameroon
- Died: 21 February 2021 (aged 65); Amiens, France
- Occupations: Activist; Politician
- Political party: Believe in Cameroon

Bernard Njonga (18 October 1955 – 21 February 2021) was a Cameroonian activist and politician.

== Biography ==
Njonga was born in Bangoua and earned a degree in agricultural engineering from the Faculté d'agronomie et des sciences agricoles in Dschang. He then became a research assistant at the Institut de Recherche Agronomique pour le Développement, serving from 1984 to 1987. In the 1980s, he founded the NGO Service d’appui aux initiatives locales de développement, which published the newspaper La Voix du Paysan.

Njonga was known for voicing his support in favor of rural Cameroonians over multinational farms. A friend of French activist José Bové, he denounced the embezzlement of funds in the corn industry and the introduction of GMOs when he became head of the Association citoyenne de défense des intérêts collectifs.

Njonga declared himself a candidate in the 2018 Cameroonian presidential election as a member of the party Believe in Cameroon, which he founded. However, he was unsuccessful.

Bernard Njonga died on 21 February 2021 in Amiens at the age of 65.
