= Dschang bus-truck crash =

2021 collision in Dschang, Cameroon that killed 53 people

- Date: 27 January 2021
- Time: 3:30 a.m.
- Location: Cliff of Dschang, Santchou commune, near Dschang, West Region, Cameroon
- Cause: Under investigation
- Deaths: 53
- Injuries: 29

In the early morning of 27 January 2021, a passenger bus operated by an interurban travel agency collided with a truck carrying fuel at the Cliff of Dschang, in the commune of Santchou, close to the major city of Dschang, Cameroon. 53 people were killed by the crash; a further 29 survived with severe burns.

== Aftermath ==
The governor of Cameroon's West Region, Awa Fonka Augustine, said fog may have been a cause of the accident, and an initial investigation found that the van's brakes had problems. He later stated: "A speeding truck illegally transporting fuel ran into the 70-seat bus transporting passengers from the coastal commercial city of Douala to Bafoussam, the capital of Cameroon’s West region," Augustine said. "A collision between the truck and the bus sparked uncontrollable fire which ravaged the truck, the bus and its occupants."

Jean Ernest Massena Ngalle Bibehe, Cameroon's Transport Minister said that the bus belonged to Menoua Voyages, an agency operating in the area.

Manfred Missimikin of road accident prevention NGO Securoute said "a succession of negligence" was to blame for the tragedy. "The truck carrying fuel was not authorised to do so," he told Agence France-Presse.
