= COVID-19 vaccination in Cameroon =

Plan to immunize against COVID-19

- Date: April 12, 2021 - present
- Location: Cameroon
- Cause: COVID-19 pandemic

COVID-19 vaccination in Cameroon is an ongoing immunisation campaign against severe acute respiratory syndrome coronavirus 2 (SARS-CoV-2), the virus that causes coronavirus disease 2019 (COVID-19), in response to the ongoing pandemic in the country.

Cameroon began its vaccination program on 12 April 2021, initially using the 200,000 doses of the Sinopharm BIBP vaccine donated by China. As of 14 June 2021, 89,180 doses have been administered, 72,111 people with one dose and 17,069 people fully vaccinated.

== History ==
=== Timeline ===
==== April 2021 ====
By the end of the month 11,616 vaccine doses had been administered.

==== May 2021 ====
By the end of the month 75,215 doses had been administered.

==== June 2021 ====
By the end of the month 110,324 doses had been administered.

==== July 2021 ====
By the end of the month 343,657 doses had been administered.

==== August 2021 ====
By the end of the month 426,590 doses had been administered.

==== September 2021 ====
By the end of the month 461,201 doses had been administered.

==== October 2021 ====
By the end of the month 503,363 doses had been administered. 1% of the targeted population had been fully vaccinated.

==== November 2021 ====
By the end of the month 923,643 doses had been administered. 5% of the targeted population had been fully vaccinated.

==== December 2021 ====
By the end of the month 1.02 million doses had been administered. 6% of the targeted population had been fully vaccinated.

==== January 2022 ====
By the end of the month 1.02 million doses had been administered. 6% of the targeted population had been fully vaccinated.

==== February 2022 ====
By the end of the month 1.3 million doses had been administered and 0.8 million persons had been fully vaccinated.

==== March 2022 ====
By the end of the month 1.8 million doses had been administered and 1.2 million persons had been fully vaccinated.

== Progress ==
Cumulative vaccinations in Cameroon

View source data.
