= 2022 Gelora Bandung Lautan Api stampede =

2022 crowd crush in Indonesia

Gelora Bandung Lautan Api stampede
- Date: 17 June 2022
- Venue: Gelora Bandung Lautan Api Stadium
- Location: Bandung, Indonesia; 6°57′31″S 107°42′41″E
- Deaths: 2

On 17 June 2022, two people died from being asphyxiated during a stampede at the gate of Gelora Bandung Lautan Api Stadium, Bandung, West Java, Indonesia while watching the 2022 President's Cup group stage match between Persib Bandung as host and Persebaya Surabaya.

== Details ==
Persib as the host announced that they were only providing 15,000 tickets, per local police recommendation for safety, for the match against Persebaya at 20:30 UTC+7, 17 June 2022. Gelora Bandung Lautan Api Stadium has a maximum capacity of 38,000. However, at the time, the stadium was full of supporters from both teams. Bonekmania, Persebaya supporters, came to Bandung in large numbers, although they were only given a 1,500 quota by the host. Some of them entered the arena without tickets. Supporters who did not have tickets entered the arena by climbing the fence and stadium walls to the second floor, even some of the entrance gates were rammed. The police estimated that 45,000 supporters from both teams were in the stadium, damaging eight entrance gates that had been closed.

At 19:00, before the match started, the entrance gates were closed and there were still many spectators outside the stadium who were forced to go inside. Two victims were in the crowd that forced their way into the stadium, which was full long before the match started. The police also stated that it was possible that both victims fell after being asphyxiated, and got trampled down by other supporters.

After they were successfully pulled out, they received medical assistance and were then rushed to Sartika Asih Hospital, but both died in the hospital.

== Victims ==
Ahmad Solihin, a 29-year-old resident of Bandung, and Sofiana Yusuf, a 20-year-old resident of Bogor, were the two people killed in the stampede.

== Aftermath ==
In response to the event, Erwin Tobing as head of the Disciplinary Committee of PSSI released that they will assist in the incident investigation. Persib posted condolence through their social media and attended the funeral of the victim. Many people from different supporter communities sent their condolence for the incident on social media. As the investigation started, match officials found fake officials ID cards that might grant people who wore it access to the stadium. Police lined the area and started the investigation after the incident. Bobotoh accused the match officials of terrible crowd management as the cause of the incident. They held a demonstration in front of Persib office on 21 June 2022.

Despite the incident, the match went on to the end with Persib winning 3–1.

The last two matches of Group C were played at Si Jalak Harupat Stadium, Bandung, and were held behind closed doors.

On 23 June 2022, PSSI finished its investigation and released its statements via the official website, and listed several points of the results of the investigation. The disciplinary committee of PSSI imposed Persib a fine of IDR 50 Million, and a ban on playing at the Gelora Bandung Lautan Api Stadium during the 2022 President's Cup.

From this incident until at least early August, Persib fans often held demonstrations at Graha Persib (Persib's office). They demanded the club to improve the ticketing system.

== See also ==
- Yaoundé stadium disaster – similar disaster in Cameroon 5 months earlier
- 2022 Kanjuruhan Stadium disaster – fatal stampede disaster in Indonesia 4 months later
