= 1992 in Cameroon =

- Decades: 1970s; 1980s; 1990s; 2000s; 2010s
- See also: Other events of 1992; List of years in Cameroon

Events in the year 1992 in Cameroon.

== Incumbents ==
- President – Paul Biya
- Prime Minister – Sadou Hayatou until 9 April, then Simon Achidi Achu

== Events ==
- 1 March – Parliamentary elections take place.
- 11 October – Presidential election takes place.
- The University of Buea becomes a full-fledged university.

== Births ==
- 5 January – Hortence Vanessa Mballa Atangana, judoka
- 2 April – Madias Nzesso, weightlifter
