= 2025 in Cameroon =

- Decades: 2000s; 2010s; 2020s
- See also: Other events of 2025; List of years in Cameroon

Events in the year 2025 in Cameroon.

== Incumbents ==
- President: Paul Biya
- Prime Minister: Joseph Ngute

== Events ==
=== January ===
- 2–3 January – Seven soldiers are killed in attacks by suspected members of Nigerian militant groups in Akwaya.

=== July ===
- 7 July – The Agence de Régulation des Télécommunications issues fines of nearly 4 million euros on the local subsidiaries of telecommunications firms Orange and MTN due issues relating to poor service quality.
- 8 July – A minibus collides with a truck near Muyuka, killing 18 people and injuring one.
- 11 July – The Diy-Gid-Biy Cultural Landscape of the Mandara Mountains is designated as a World Heritage Site by UNESCO.
- 14 July – President Paul Biya officially announces his candidacy for an eighth term in the presidential election scheduled for 12 October 2025.

=== August ===
- 12 August – A letter from French president Emmanuel Macron to president Biya is released in which the French government officially acknowledges its actions against the Cameroonian independence movement from 1945 to 1971 as a war.
- 13 August – Fourteen people, including three Chadian nationals, are abducted from a bus by suspected Boko Haram militants in Zigague. One of the hostages dies in captivity, while the remainder are rescued by security forces two weeks later.
- 24 August – Cameroon finishes in fourth place at FIBA AfroBasket 2025 in Angola after losing to Senegal 98-72 in the final in Luanda.

=== September ===
- 5 September – Seven soldiers are killed in a roadside bombing near Malende claimed by the Fako Unity Warriors, an Anglophone separatist group.

=== October ===
- 12 October – 2025 Cameroonian presidential election: Incumbent president Paul Biya is elected to an eighth term in office after winning 53.7% of the vote, according to official results.
- 15 October – The offices of the Cameroon People's Democratic Movement in Dschang are set on fire amid protests against alleged fraud in the presidential election.
- 24 October – Opposition leaders Anicet Ekane and Djeukam Tchameni are arrested in Douala amid the nationwide protests over presidential election.
- 26 October – Four people are killed in Douala during protests by supporters of Issa Tchiroma, who claimed victory in the presidential election ahead of the official results.

=== November ===
- 6 November – Paul Biya is inaugurated for a new term as president.
- 7 November – Issa Tchiroma flees to the Gambia due to safety concerns and is granted asylum.

=== December ===
- 3 December – A strike and blockade is launched by truck drivers along National Highway 1 in the Adamawa Region in protest over the beating of one of their colleagues by a gendarme in Meiganga.
- 8 December – A fuel tanker crashes into several cars and buildings before exploding in Likomba, Southwest Region, killing eight people.

== Deaths ==
- 12 April – Luc Réné Bell, 77, governor of Northwest Region (1992–1996), senator (since 2013).
- 10 May – Koyo Kouoh, 57, museum curator.
- 16 May – Emmanuel Kundé, 68, football player (Canon Yaoundé, national team) and manager (US Bitam).
- 15 October – Luc Ayang, 78, prime minister (1983–1984).
- 1 December – Anicet Ekane, 74, opposition politician.
