= 2015 in Cameroon =

- Decades: 1990s; 2000s; 2010s; 2020s
- See also: Other events of 2015; List of years in Cameroon

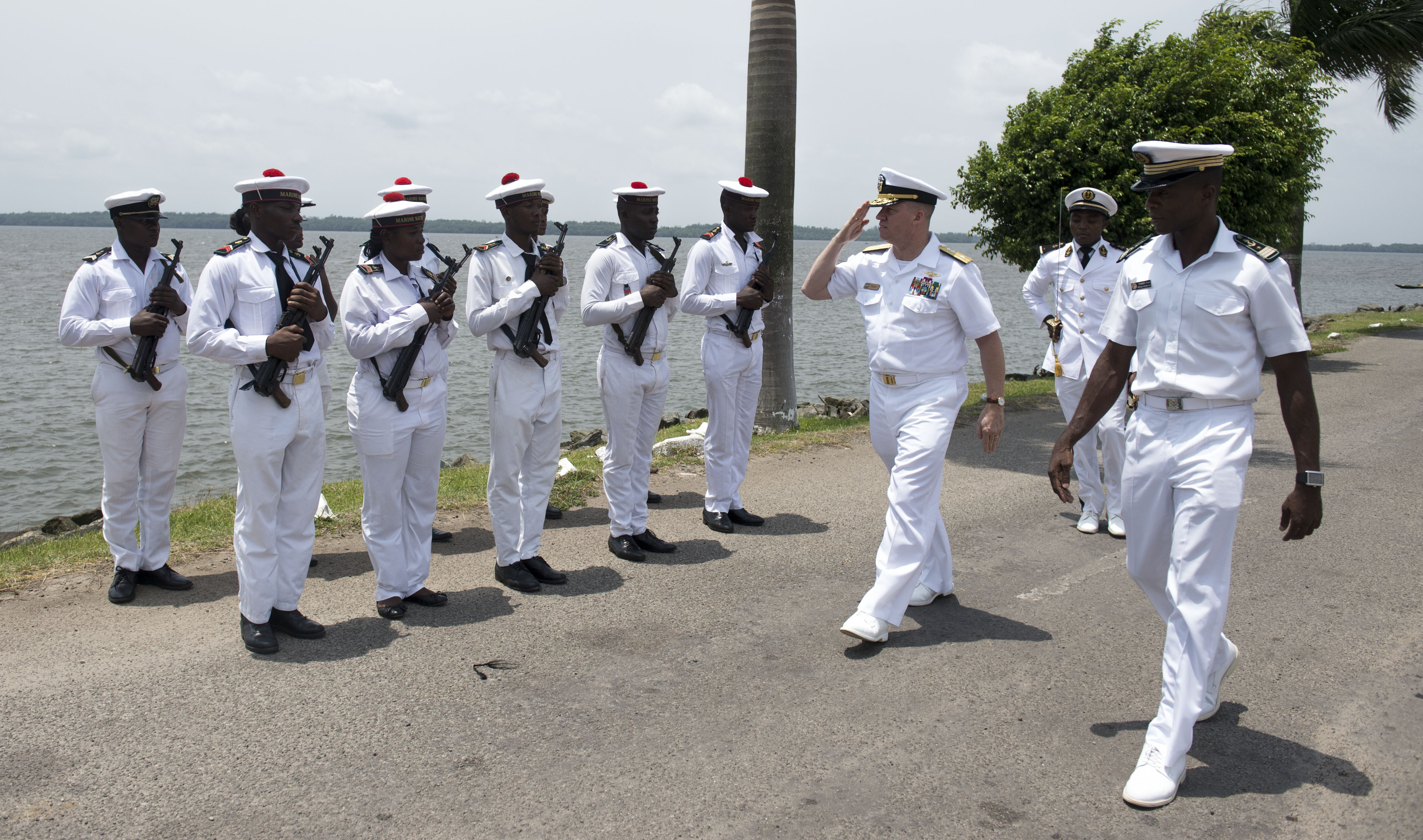

The following lists events that happened during 2015 in Cameroon.

== Incumbents ==
- President: Paul Biya
- Prime Minister: Philémon Yang

== Events ==
=== January ===
- 2 January - Boko Haram militants attack a bus in Waza killing eleven people and injuring six.
- 12 January - Cameroon kills 143 Boko Haram fighters in clashes.
- 15 January - The Military of Chad enters Cameroon to assist in fighting against Boko Haram insurgents.
- 17 January - Following the Chad authorities decision to send troops to Nigeria and Cameroon to fight Boko Haram militants, the Russian ambassador to the country pledges to supply Cameroon with more modern weapons to combat the Islamist insurgents.
- 18 January - Boko Haram militants kidnap 80 people and kill three others from villages in north Cameroon.
