= 2006 in Cameroon =

- Decades: 1980s; 1990s; 2000s; 2010s; 2020s
- See also: Other events of 2006; List of years in Cameroon

The following events happened in Cameroon in the year 2006.

== Incumbents ==
- President: Paul Biya
- Prime Minister: Ephraïm Inoni

== Events ==
=== March ===
- March 23 - More than 100 people die after their boat capsizes in Cameroon.

=== May ===
- May 25 - Scientists confirm the theory that HIV originated among wild chimpanzees in Cameroon.

=== July ===
- July 3 - United Nations Secretary General Kofi Annan issues a report warning that ongoing fighting in Chad, Sudan, the Central African Republic, and Cameroon are increasingly destabilized and that borders are loosely enforced.
