= 1986 in Cameroon =

- Decades: 1960s; 1970s; 1980s; 1990s; 2000s
- See also: Other events of 1986; List of years in Cameroon

Events in the year 1986 in Cameroon

== Incumbents ==
- President – Paul Biya

== Events ==
- 21 August – Lake Nyos disaster: A large amount of carbon dioxide erupts from Lake Nyos resulting in the deaths of between 1,700 and 1,800 people.

== Births ==
- 25 May – Joëlle Mbumi Nkouindjin, athlete
- 8 October – Sarah Hanffou, table tennis player
