= Rose Zang Nguele =

Cameroonian politician (1947–2023)

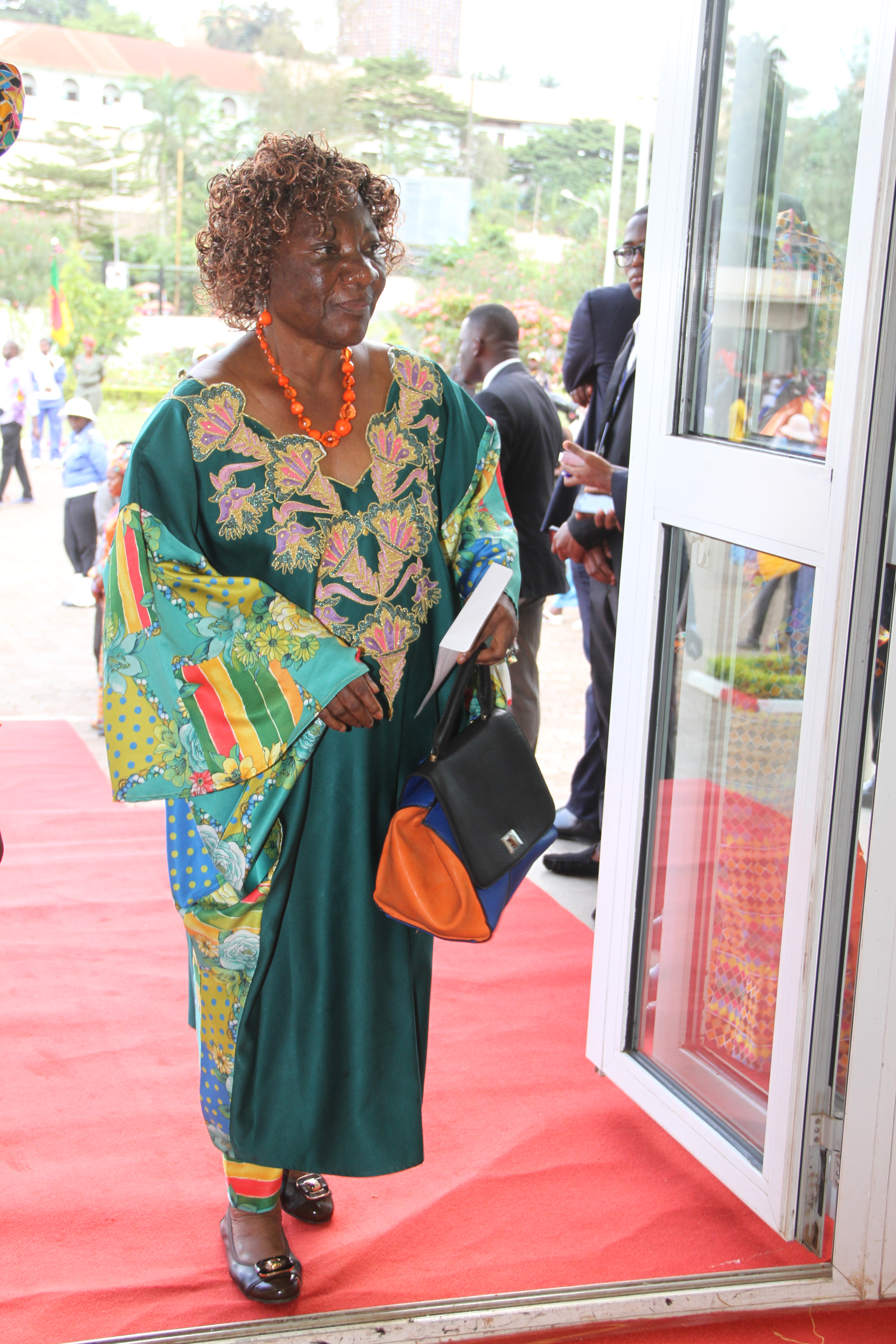
- Nguele in 2016
- Born: 12 May 1947; Yaoundé, French Cameroon
- Died: 24 July 2023 (aged 76)
- Occupation: Politician
- Years active: 1984–1997
- Political party: CPDM

Rose Zang Nguele (12 May 1947 – 24 July 2023) was a Cameroonian politician. She served as the Minister of Social Affairs of Cameroon from 1984 to 1988 and as a member of the National Assembly from 1992 to 1997.

== Education ==
From 1955 to 1959, Nguele completed her elementary schooling at the Notre-Dame-des-Victoires School. Then, from 1959 to 1960, Nguele continued her primary education at the École primaire d’Abong Mbang and École primaire de Lomié. She then completed her secondary studies at Lycée Général Leclerc in Yaoundé, the capital of Cameroon.

In 1974, Nguele completed her university studies at the University of Yaoundé, obtaining an advanced studies diploma (DEA) in modern French Literature. This degree is a Master's degree, meaning she completed 1 year of post-license study.

Following her graduation, Nguele began a career teaching French and Spanish at several schools, including Lycée Technique Commercial de Yaoundé, the Collège de la Retraite, and her secondary school alma mater, the Lycée Général Leclerc.

== Career ==
Nguele was first appointed National Inspector of French Language Pedagogy at the Ministry of National Education. Following this position, she was appointed to the role of Minister of Social Affairs, which she served as minister between 1984–1988. Nguele left her government position on May 16, 1988, where she was inactive for 2.5 months. However, on August 5, 1988, she was appointed as Deputy Director General at the Directorate General of Tourism Development.

Nguele was a Member of the National Assembly from 1992–1997. She was also the First Deputy Mayor of the Urban Community of Yaoundé

Nguele was a committed member of the Cameroon People's Democratic Movement (RDPC) up until her death. She had several roles in the party, including being a full member of the RDPC's Central Committee and Political Bureau. Nguele also served as Vice-President of the CPDM's Women's Organization (OFRDPC) and the Deputy Secretary for Organization.

== Death ==
Following a period of illness, Nguele died at the Yaoundé General Hospital on the night of 24 July 2023. She was 76 years old.
