= 2024 in Cameroon =

- Decades: 2000s; 2010s; 2020s
- See also: Other events of 2024; List of years in Cameroon

Events in the year 2024 in Cameroon.

== Incumbents ==
- President: Paul Biya
- Prime Minister: Joseph Ngute

== Events ==
=== January ===
- 15 January – A Cameroonian peacekeeper in MINUSCA is killed and five others are injured in an explosion in Mbindale, Lim-Pendé, Central African Republic.
- 30 January – Hervé Bopda is arrested following public outcry, petitions, and multiple complaints accusing him of sexual offenses.

=== February ===
- 14 February – The trial for the Ngarbuh massacre is restarted after multiple postponements, amidst concerns about delays and lack of full accountability.

=== March ===
- 8 March – Aboubacar Siddiki Babadjo is arrested in Ngaoundéré for criticizing the regional governor. He is released just over three months later but is immediately rearrested on public order charges.
- 12 March – The government bans two opposition coalitions, the APC and APT, calling them illegal “clandestine movements.”

=== April ===
- 10 April – Battle of Kumbo: Ambazonian rebels attack a BIR base in Kumbo, leaving several insurgents and one soldier dead. Raids by security forces follow, with disputed reports of civilian deaths.
- 30 April – The Cameroon Armed Forces inaugurate a new BIR base in Kumbo, aiming to strengthen security in the region amidst the ongoing separatist insurgency.

=== June ===
- 21-16 June – The 2024 African Championships in Athletics is held at the Japoma Stadium Sports Complex in Douala. Over 800 athletes from 49 African countries participate.

=== July ===
- 2-4 July – The 3rd AISCCUF Youth Congress takes place in Yaoundé, with audit institutions discussing governance, SDGs, and public policy, alongside cultural events.
- 3 July – Brenda Biya, daughter of President Paul Biya, posts an Instagram photo hinting at a same-sex relationship, sparking controversy in Cameroon where such relationships are illegal.
- 16 July – Emmanuel Mariel Djikdent, head of the Mfoundi department, issues a decree banning anyone who "dangerously insults" state institutions or their representatives from staying in the division, citing public order concerns.
- 18 July – The United States approves humanitarian parole for 27 Cameroonian asylum seekers deported in 2020, allowing their return due to abuses suffered in US detention and after deportation to Cameroon.
- 26 July-11 August: Cameroon at the 2024 Summer Olympics

=== September ===
- 23 September – Lucas Cho Ayaba, leader of the Ambazonia Governing Council, is arrested in Norway for incitement to crimes against humanity in Cameroon.
- 9-10 September – Cameroon host International Literacy Day celebrations in Yaoundé, featuring a UNESCO conference and the Literacy Prizes ceremony.
- 30 September –
  - FIFA bans Cameroonian Football Federation president Samuel Eto'o from attending matches of the Cameroon national football team for six months for “offensive behavior and violations of the principles of fair play” and misconduct of officials.
  - Police and Interpol raid the Douala office of Alternatives-Cameroun, arresting 13 LGBTQI activists; nine are later released on bail. Forced anal examinations are later carried out on the remaining four activists, condemned as torture by the World Health Organization.

=== October ===
- 9 October – Minister Paul Atanga Nji bans media debates on President Biya’s health, calling it a “security issue” and instructs governors to monitor and report critical comments.

=== November ===
- 3 November – Two men are lynched by a mob in Yaoundé after being accused of homosexual acts in a car, sparking outrage over violence against LGBTQI individuals in Cameroon.
- 5 November – At least four people are killed and 50 others are reported missing following a landslide in the West Region on the highway connecting Dschang and Douala.
- 19 November – The European Union announces a 91 million euro ($96 million) loan to Cameroon aimed at developing its energy sector, road infrastructure, and transportation links to Chad and Equatorial Guinea.
- 27 November – In Douala, three gendarmes arrest and severely beat prominent human rights lawyer Richard Tamfu while he is assisting a client.

=== December ===
- 5 December – Minister Paul Atanga Nji suspend REDHAC and other civil society groups for three months, citing illicit funding and legal violations.
