= Consty Eka =

Cameroonian television presenter and businessman (1961–2026)

- Born: 13 January 1961; Yaoundé ,Cameroon
- Died: 16 February 2026 (aged 65); Abidjan, Ivory Coast
- Other names: Constan Marie Eka Mebenga
- Occupations: Television presenter, businessman

Consty Eka (13 January 1961 – 16 February 2026) was a Cameroonian television presenter and businessman.

== Career ==
Eka became a prominent figure in the Cameroonian and Ivorian media landscapes in the 1980s, creating the CEKAM group and the channels CEN TV and Voltage 2. During the 2018 Cameroonian presidential election, he produced programs and special TV reports for CEN TV, including content related to President Paul Biya.

== Death ==
Eka died in Abidjan on 16 February 2026, at the age of 65.
