= 2019 in Cameroon =

- Decades: 1990s; 2000s; 2010s; 2020s
- See also: Other events of 2019; List of years in Cameroon

== Incumbents ==
- President: Paul Biya
- Prime Minister: Philémon Yang (until January 4); Joseph Ngute onwards

== Events ==
- April 27: Kidnappings of John Fru Ndi
- May 2: The Ambazonian leadership crisis begins.
- July 22: July 2019 Cameroon prison riots
- September 30 – October 4: Major National Dialogue

== Deaths ==
- May 8 – Martin Belinga Eboutou, 79, political figure and diploma.
- August 1 – Sadou Hayatou, 77, politician, prime minister (1991–1992).
- September 3 – Athanase Bala, 92, Roman Catholic prelate, Bishop of Bafia (1977–2003).
- October 6 – Bernard Muna, 79, politician, Deputy Prosecutor of the International Criminal Tribunal for Rwanda (1997–2001).

== See also ==
- Timeline of the Anglophone Crisis (2019)
