= Aishatu Gidado Idris =

Nigerian author (born 1960)

- Born: July 9, 1960 (age 65); Zaria, Northern Region, British Nigeria (now in Kaduna State, Nigeria)
- Other names: Uwa
- Occupation: Writer
- Father: Gidado Idris

Aishatu Gidado Idris (born July 9, 1960) is a Nigerian author who writes in Hausa and English. Her books are mainly about marriage and relationships. She has written 11 books including her memoir, five in Hausa in and six in English. She is known for her tough stance on women and counselling in relationships. She is among the prominent female writers in Northern Nigeria.

== Early life ==
Born in Zaria, Aishatu Gidado Idris is the eldest daughter of late Alhaji Gidado Idris, who was the secretary to the government of the federation under General Sani Abacha. She went to Saint Anne School in Kaduna and Queen Amina College for her early education and later proceeded to Ahmadu Bello University, Zaria where she started studying law before dropping out in her second year. She married Captain Muhammad Bala Shagari in 1980 and had three children with him before they were separated and she remarried.

== Bibliography ==
- Rabiat
- Rabiat's Diary. Informat. 2002. ISBN 9789783578692.
- Picking Up the Pieces. Author House. ISBN 9781456770464.
- Memoirs of a modern Hausa girl
- A reply to a letter
- Macentaka
- Kace Nace
- Duniya Madubi
- Duniya Gizo
- Its Complicated (Memoir)
