= Jean Pierre Biyiti bi Essam =

Cameroonian politician and diplomat (1949–2026)

Jean Pierre Biyiti bi Essam (20 July 1949 – 23 April 2026) was a Cameroonian politician and diplomat.

== Life and career ==
Jean Pierre Biyiti bi Essam was born in Ebolowa on 20 July 1949. He served as the Minister of Posts and Telecommunications from 30 June 2009 to 1 October 2015. He served as the Ambassador of Cameroon to Israel from 31 May 2018 until his death in 2026.

== Death ==
Biyiti bi Essam died in Tel Aviv on 23 April 2026, at the age of 76.
