= Samuel Wembé =

Cameroonian businessman (1947–2020)

- Born: 1 January 1947; French Cameroon
- Died: 12 April 2020 (aged 73); Douala, Cameroon
- Occupation: Businessman

Samuel Wembé (1 January 1947 – 12 April 2020) was a Cameroonian businessman who also served as a deputy in the Cameroon National Assembly.

== Biography ==
Wembé was born on 1 January 1947 in French Cameroon. He once served as a Deputy for Mifi. He was heavily involved in importation and exportation in Douala. He also served as chairman of the board of directors of RC Bafoussam.

Samuel Wembé died on 12 April 2020 in Douala at the age of 73 due to COVID-19. The announcement of the death of Samuel Wembé, former MP for Mifi, was initially met with disbelief by CPDM activists in the department before being confirmed by his family and close associates. The man whom many young members of the party considered their mentor will no longer be present at major political events for the ruling party.

== Career ==
Samuel Wembe was a politician, entrepreneur, sports leader and member of the executive council of the Cameroonian football federation.
