= Manamourou Silikam =

Cameroonian politician (died 2023)

- Born: 1973
- Died: June 23, 2023 (aged 49)
- Citizenship: Cameroon
- Occupation: politician
- Title: Member of Parliament

Isabelle Manamourou Silikam (c. 1973 – 23 June 2023) was a Cameroonian politician who was a member of the Pan-African Parliament.

Silikam died on 23 June 2023, at the age of 49.

== See also ==
- List of members of the Pan-African Parliament
