= 2010 in Cameroon =

- Decades: 1990s; 2000s; 2010s; 2020s
- See also: Other events of 2010; List of years in Cameroon

Events from 2010 in Cameroon.

== Incumbents ==
- President: Paul Biya
- Prime Minister: Philémon Yang

== Events ==
=== June ===
- Cameroon National team played in the 2010 FIFA World Cup. They lost in the group stage round.

=== October ===
- Cameroon participated in the 2010 Commonwealth Games.

== See also ==
- Cameroon national football team 2010
- Cameroon at the 2010 Summer Youth Olympics
- 2010–11 Elite One
- Cameroon at the 2010 Commonwealth Games
- 2010 African Judo Championships
- 2010 Miss Cameroon beauty pageant
- List of years by country

== Bibliography ==
- Fanny Pigeaud (2011). "Cameroon". In Andreas Mehler; et al. (eds.). Africa Yearbook: Politics, Economy and Society South of the Sahara in 2010. Koninklijke Brill. pp. 211–220. ISBN 90-04-20556-X.
