= Yaoundé stadium disaster =

2022 crowd crush in Cameroon

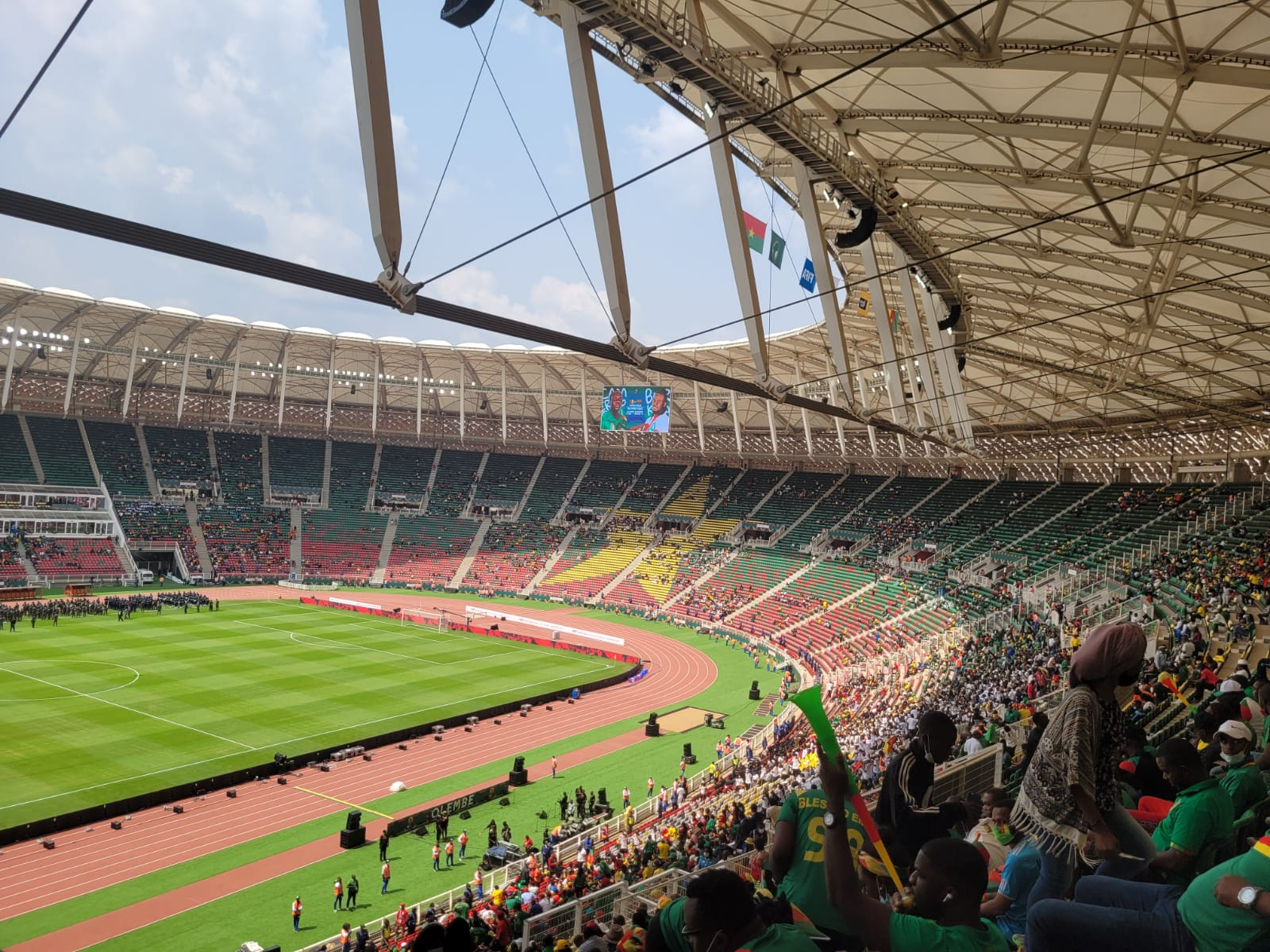
- The stadium 15 days before the disaster
- Date: 24 January 2022
- Venue: Olembe Stadium
- Location: Yaoundé, Cameroon; 03°57′03″N 11°32′26″E
- Deaths: 8
- Injuries: 38

On 24 January 2022, at least eight people were killed in a crowd crush at the south entrance of Olembe Stadium in Yaoundé, Cameroon. The incident occurred as fans were attempting to enter the arena to watch a football match between Cameroon and the Comoros at the 2021 Africa Cup of Nations.

== Background ==
The Confederation of African Football decided to move a quarter final and semifinal of the Africa Cup of Nations from Japoma Stadium in Douala, the economic capital of Cameroon, to Olembe Stadium with just four days' notice. COVID-19 restrictions meant that only 80 percent of the stadium's capacity could be filled, and fans were required to be fully vaccinated and present a negative COVID-19 test to enter.

== Disaster ==
Before the fourth match in the knockout stage between hosts Cameroon and the Comoros, which kicked off at 20:00 on 24 January 2022 at the Olembe Stadium, a crush developed at the south entrance to the stadium. Security officers directed fans towards a locked entrance gate. When the gate was opened, a surge of people came through and trampled each other, killing eight. 38 others were injured, with seven in critical condition. The match continued, even after the crush.

== Aftermath ==
According to the World Health Organization, the influx of victims "quickly overwhelmed nearby hospitals". The WHO said that this would have been avoided if the hospital staff had better training and if they had an effective mass casualty management plan.

Following the event, the quarter-final match scheduled to take place at Olembe Stadium the following week was relocated to Ahmadou Ahidjo Stadium.

President Paul Biya offered his condolences to the families of the victims and ordered an investigation into the crush. Manaouda Malachie, the Cameroonian minister of health, "pledged government support for the victims during a tour of hospitals". Narcisse Mouelle Kombi, the sports minister of Cameroon, said that the decision to open the south gate was "reckless".

The Confederation of African Football's investigation into the disaster was announced to focus on who closed the south gate to the stadium. The president of the CAF, Patrice Motsepe, said that the crush should have been prevented and that such loss of life will "never happen again". The stadium was authorized to reopen on 30 January after the Confederation of African Football lifted the suspension placed on the stadium. This allowed one of the 2021 Africa Cup of Nations semi-finals to be played there in early February.

== See also ==
- Yaoundé nightclub fire, which happened the previous day
- Gelora Bandung Lautan Api crowd crush, similar disaster happened in Indonesia
- Crowd collapses and crushes § Crowd "stampedes"
