= Michel Thierry Atangana =

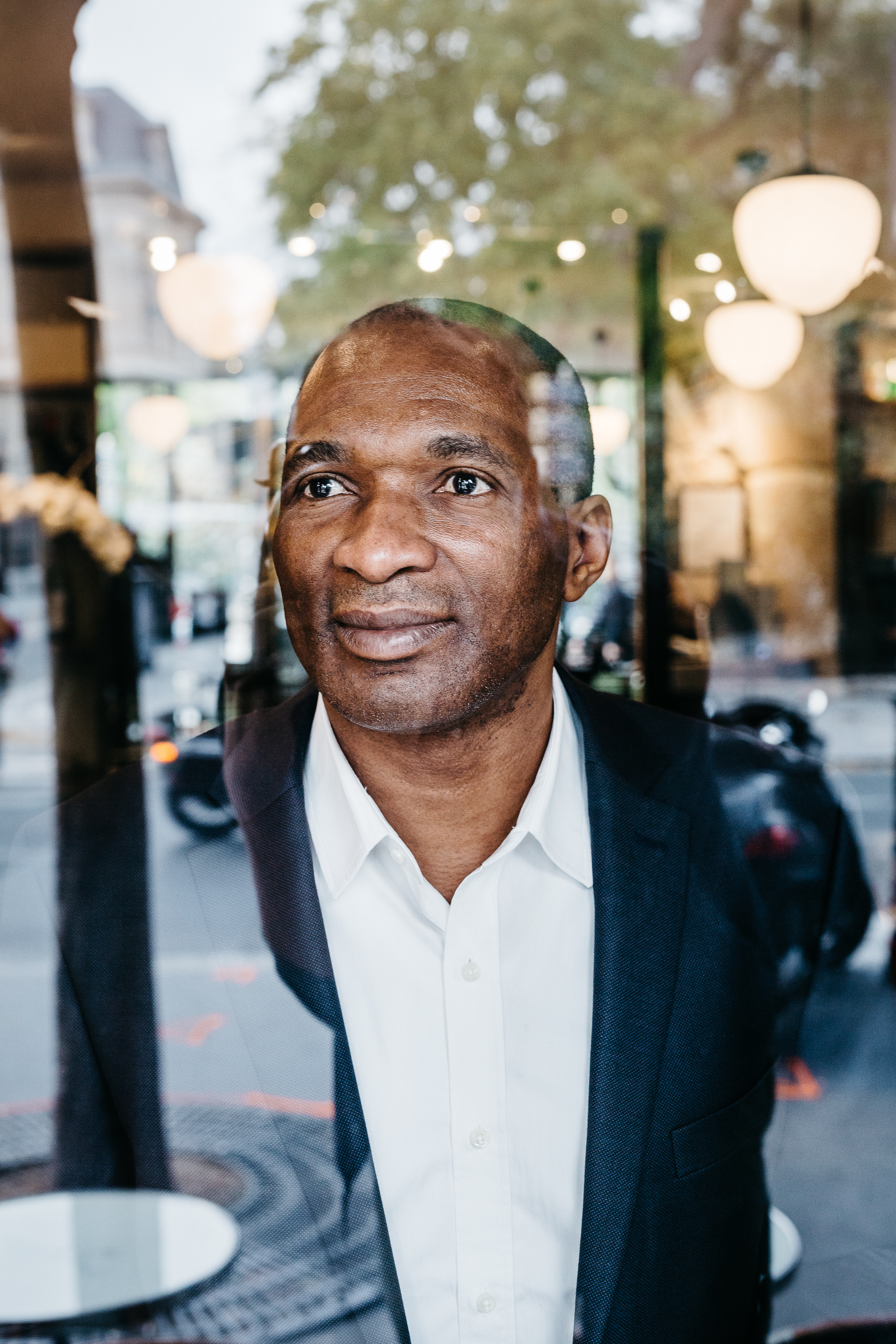
Michel Thierry Atangana

Michel Thierry Atangana is a French citizen of Cameroonian origin who was imprisoned in Yaoundé, Cameroon from 1997 until 2014. International human rights organisations declared him a political prisoner, held for support of potential presidential candidate Titus Edzoa. Atagana was released in 2014 by presidential decree.

== Arrest ==
Michel Atangana returned to Cameroon in 1994 to head Copisur, a government body overseeing road construction projects. He worked closely with Titus Edzoa, who announced in April 1997 that he would run against the incumbent Paul Biya for the post of the president of Cameroon in the election scheduled for that October. On 12 May 1997, Atangana was arrested and detained for 52 days without trial. The Cameroonian government eventually alleged embezzlement of public funds and sentenced him to 20 years in prison. Edzoa was arrested in October of the same year, imprisoned and also charged with embezzlement.

== Detention ==
Atangana spent 17 years in a cell below the Yaoundé gendarmerie. Human rights organizations including Amnesty International and Freedom House condemned his imprisonment. In 2005, the U.S. Department of State declared him a political prisoner. In 2013, Amnesty International considered him a prisoner of conscience. In 2013, the United Nations Working Group on Arbitrary Detention published their report concluding that his arrest and detention were arbitrary and that he should be released immediately.

== Release ==
In February 2014, President Paul Biya issued a decree, releasing Atangana from imprisonment, but not reversing his court conviction or returning his confiscated property.
