= Believe in Cameroon =

Political party in Cameroon

Believe in Cameroon (French: Croire au Cameroun, CRAC) is a political party in Cameroon. The party places a heavy emphasis on agricultural issues which it believes is a key part of the country's socio-economic development. Bernard Njonga, the founder of CRAC, is a candidate in the 2018 presidential elections.
