= Fabien Eboussi Boulaga =

Cameroonian philosopher (1934–2018)

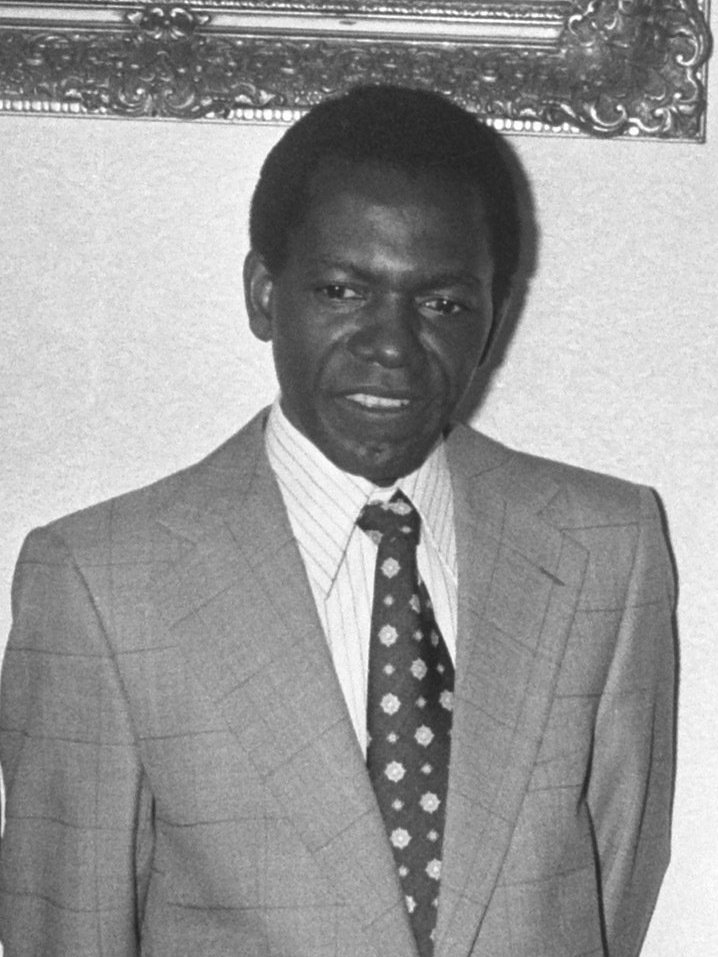
Born Fabien Eboussi Boulaga17 January 1934Bafia, CameroonDied 13 October 2018 (84)Yaoundé, Cameroon

Fabien Eboussi Boulaga (17 January 1934 – 13 October 2018) was a Cameroonian philosopher.

== Biography ==
Born in 1934 in Bafia, Eboussi Boulaga earned his high school diploma from the Akono Minor Seminary (South Cameroon), before joining the Society of Jesus (Jesuits) in 1955. He was ordained as a priest in 1969, and became an official member of the Society of Jesus in 1973. He became known as a polemical figure, for example in his book Bantou problématique (1968), and in his theological stance, notably in La démission (1974), which caused an outcry in ecclesiastical circles; this latter publication called for the organised departure of missionaries. Three years later, he published La Crise du Muntu, which tackled questions of authenticity and tradition, a particularly fashionable topic in the 1970s. In 1980, he decided to leave the Jesuits and asked to return to secular life. Boulaga's departure from sacerdotal and religious life was the product of a carefully matured decision; he claimed to have "lost his faith" since 1969. A year later, he published Christianisme sans fétiche, which questions the dogmatic and metaphysical assumptions of Catholicism in a colonial context. Boulaga has a Bachelors in Theology from the University of Lyon, and a Doctor of Philosophy and of Letters, and was a teacher in Abidjan, then professor at the University of Yaoundé.

In the 1980s, Boulaga became active in associations for the defence of human rights. He published works, first on theology, and then on politics. From 1994 to his death, he was a professor at the Catholic University of Central Africa.

== Philosophy ==
Fabien Eboussi Boulauga’s philosophical work dealt with the methodological intersection of African philosophy and colonialism in the late twentieth and early twenty-first centuries. The political and cultural environment he grew up in strongly influenced his intellectual ideas and the orientation of his work, as it consistently examines the relationship between African societies and inherited political, religious, and epistemic frameworks. His writings aim to critique and analyze the historical impact of colonialism on African philosophy instead of establishing a systematic metaphysical doctrine.

Christogram for Society of Jesus

Boulaga was trained in Catholic theology and was ordained a priest with the Society of Jesus ( Jesuits) in 1969. He later resigned or was ‘defrocked’ in 1980. He later claimed that he had experienced a ‘loss in faith’ at the point of his ordinance. His experience and familiarity with Christian doctrine, combined with his academic background in theology, impacted his philosophical works. He evaluated the relationship between colonialism and African religion.

In Boulaga’s second book, Christianisme sans fétiche (1984), meaning Christianity without Fetishes, he examines Christianity and how it was introduced to Africans during colonization and its present role in post-colonial African societies, reshaping traditional African practices and perspectives. In his investigation, he critiques metaphysical dependence on Christianity by comparing how this imported religion aligns with traditional African modes of thought. His purpose behind writing the book lies within the name, as he makes an effort to analyze the core pure essence of Christian belief beyond the scope instilled through colonial authority.

Through his works, Boulaga analyzes the formation of tradition. His writings explore how traditional practices change throughout time based on historical contexts such as colonialism, religion, and education. This perspective on tradition was used within broader methodological debates in African philosophy, such as the critique of Ethnophilosophy.

Boulaga’s literary and academic work is often cited within the context of Ethnophilosophy. Ethnophilosophy is when philosophy is presented as cultural beliefs and worldviews. In African philosophy circles, Boulaga’s writings are utilized in the discussions about the debate on the difference between cultural descriptions and ideological discourse.

Boulaga was concerned about African authenticity and the definition of African philosophy and identity. In La crise du Muntu, he explores the debates of the 1960s and 70s that explored the relationship between the “African tradition” and “worldview” in political discourse and questioned whether they were authentic or constructs. Boulaga emphasized that there was a need to examine the conditions under which ideas originated, how they were produced, and then shared.

In addition to his work on religion and the African traditions, Boulaga’s writings also addressed the changes in politics and the developments of political liberalization that occurred towards the end of the twentieth century. He focused on Central Africa and the various issues of transitions in government, changes in democracy, reform in constitutions, and political legitimacy. There was an examination of concepts of citizenship and authority, and the levels of which there is public accountability. He analyzed the process of government and sought to ground his work in tangible, and not abstract, theory.

After leaving the Jesuit order in 1980, Boulaga’s focus turned to sociopolitical issues in Cameroon and Central Africa. He was involved in informal human rights organizations throughout the 1980s and 1990s. Writings from this period of activism include La démocratie de transit au Cameroun (1997) and Les conférences nationales en Afrique: Une affaire à suivre (1993) highlight his views in human rights advocacy.

In Boulaga’s La démocratie de transit au Cameroun (1997), he reflects on Cameroon's transition from an authoritarian government to a democracy and the challenges that come with doing so. In this work, he emphasizes the significance of the unification of politically aware citizens in a successful democratization process. Boulaga also helps rethink this approach by suggesting the integration of African methodologies and traditional institutions for a stable government.

In Boulaga’s Les conférences nationales en Afrique: Une affaire à suivre (“National Conferences in Africa: A Matter to Follow”) (1993), he analyzed the national conferences held in multiple countries across Africa, including Benin, Mali, Togo, and Cameroon. In these conferences, political leaders joined to discuss the implementation of democracy in their governance. In his book, Boulaga examines the social, legal, and administrative constraints that would limit the outcomes of these meetings.

Boulaga’s later writings, such as L’Affaire de la philosophie africaine, continue the discussion and dispute around the definition of African philosophy. It emphasizes the debate about the boundaries and methodology of how and from where African philosophy is rooted. It furthers the debate by assessment and analysis without offering any singular solution, resulting in added discourse.

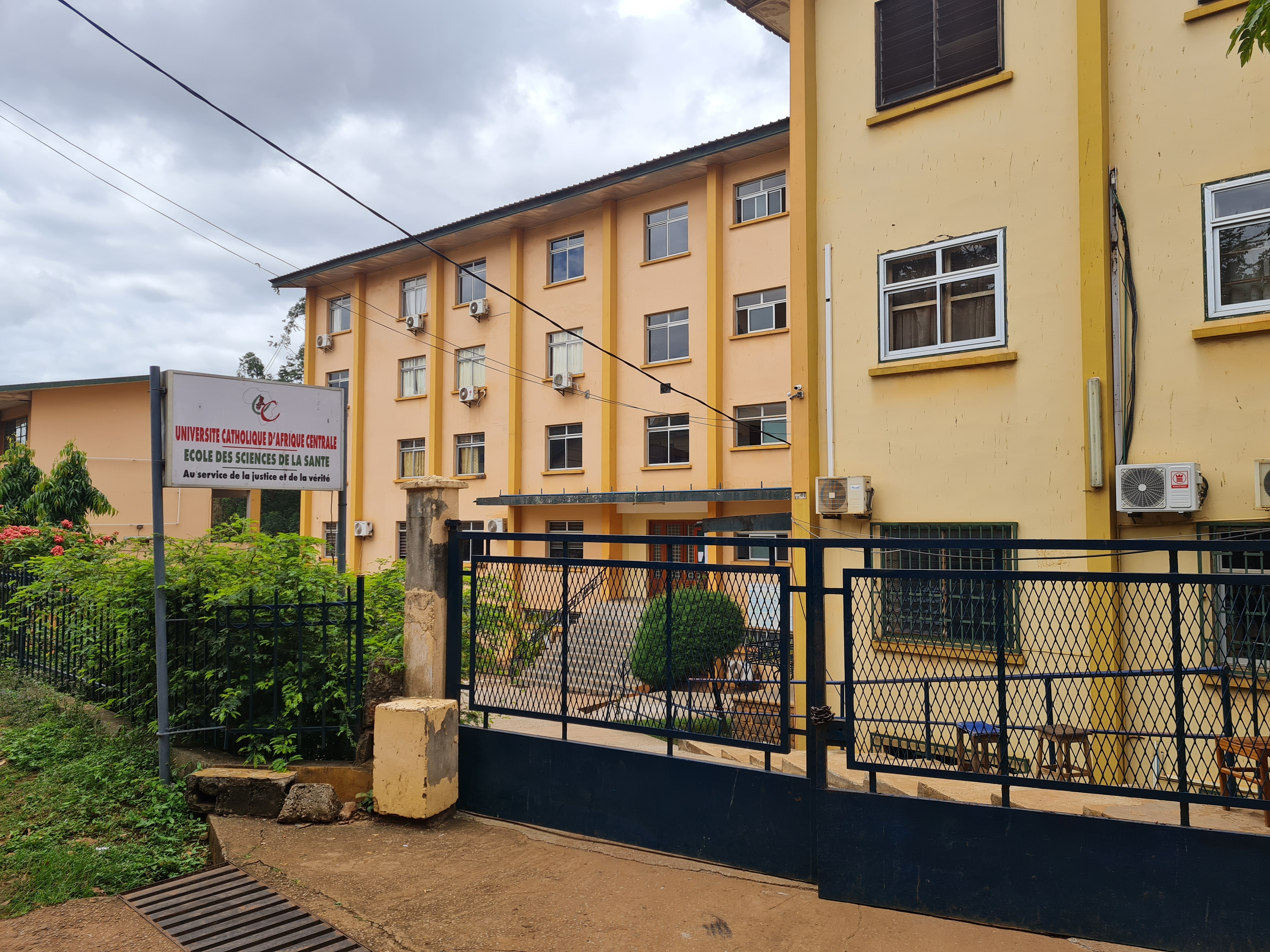
Université Catholique d’Afrique Centrale (UCAC), where Boulaga worked as a professor from 1994 until his death in 2018.

Boulaga worked as an academic in various institutions such as universities in Côte d’Ivoire and Cameroon. He served different roles, often teaching, some supervisory, and was able to participate in conferences and publish as well. It offered him access and exposure to students and scholars of philosophy, theology, and political studies.

Boulaga’s work can be found referenced in a variety of academic texts and university curricula on African philosophy and religion. His books have been republished and translated. His works are used as references within scholarly discussions and journals that explore African philosophy as a field of study.

Overall, Fabien Eboussi Boulaga’s contributions were significant to the discourse on African philosophy foundations. He explored the connections between tradition, politics, and religion and how they were shaped by pre- and post-colonial experiences.

== Death ==
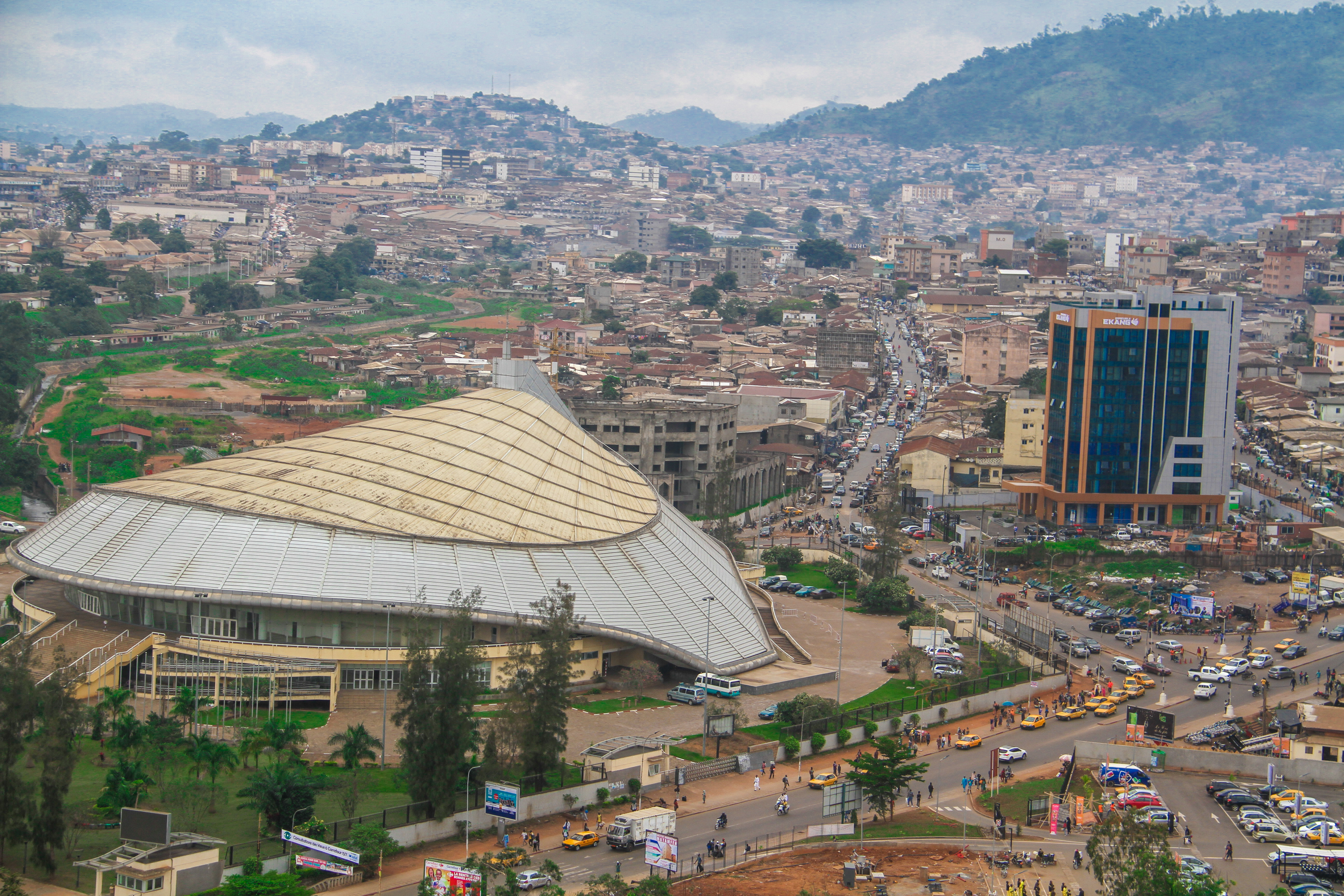
Yaoundé, Cameroon

Fabian Eboussi Boulaga died on October 13th, 2018, around 3 pm from age and illness at Clinique du Jourdain, a hospital in Yaoundé, Cameroon, at the age of 84. He was buried on October 27th, 2018, in his home village of Yorro in Cameroon.

== Bibliography ==
- La crise du Muntu, Authenticité africaine et philosophie, Présence africaine, Paris, 1977 et 1997. English translation, Muntu in Crisis: African Authenticity and Philosophy, Trenton, 2014.
- Christianisme sans fétiche, Présence africaine, Paris, 1981.
- A contretemps, L’enjeu de Dieu en Afrique, Karthala, Paris 1992.
- Les conférences nationales en Afrique, Une affaire à suivre, Karthala, Paris, 1993.
- La démocratie de transit au Cameroun, L'Harmattan, Paris, 1997.
- Lignes de résistance, Éditions CLE, Yaoundé, 1999.
- Christianity without fetishes, Orbis, New York, 1985.
- Christianity without fetishes, Lit Verlag, Germany, 2002
- Le génocide rwandais - Les interrogations des intellectuels africains, (Sous dir.), Éditions CLE, Yaoundé, 2006.
- La dialectique de la foi et de la raison (Sous la direction), éditions terroirs, Yaoundé, 319 pages, 2007.
- L'Affaire de la philosophie africaine. Au-delà des querelles, Karthala-éditions terroirs, Paris-Yaoundé, 2011.
