= Luc Réné Bell =

Cameroonian politician (1948–2025)

Member of the Senate of Cameroon
- In office 29 April 2013 – 12 April 2025

Governor of West Region
- In office 19 October 1996 – 7 December 1997

Governor of Northwest Region
- In office 1992–1996

Personal details
- Born: 29 January 1948; Makak, French Cameroon
- Died: 12 April 2025 (aged 77)
- Political party: CPDM
- Education: National School of Administration and Magistracy
- Occupation: Civil servant

Luc Réné Bell (29 January 1948 – 12 April 2025) was a Cameroonian politician of the Cameroon People's Democratic Movement (CPDM).

== Life and career ==
Born in Makak on 29 January 1948, Bell graduated from the National School of Administration and Magistracy in 1980. He began working at the Ministry of Youth and Sports. On 13 June 1984, he joined the Central Committee of the CPDM before serving as Governor of the Northwest Region. From 1996 to 1997, he was Governor of the West Region. In 2013, he was elected to the Senate.

Bell died on 12 April 2025, at the age of 77.
