= Pascal Monkam =

Cameroonian businessman (1930–2021)

- Born: 1930; Bakassa, French Cameroon
- Died: 27 February 2021 (aged 90); South Africa
- Occupation: Businessman
- Awards: Grand Cordon of the Order of Valour

Pascal Monkam (1930 – 27 February 2021) was a Cameroonian businessman. He notably owned the hotel chain La Falaise and was the father of 16 children.

== Biography ==
Monkam was born in the village of Bakassa in the department of Haut-Nkam to Nganou and Leukam Monkam, both peasants. He lost his father at a very young age and lived with his brother, Michel, in Douala.

Monkam founded the Société des Établissements Monkam in the early 1960s. His father-in-law gave him a loan of 300,000 Central African francs so that he could buy his first hotel, "Coin du Plaisir". In 1972, he founded the hotel chain La Falaise, starting it out in the upscale Douala neighborhood of Bonanjo, where former French colonists still lived. He would also open Douala hotels in Akwa and Bonapriso, as well as in Bafang and Yaoundé. He opened other locations in South Africa, including twin towers bearing his name and three hotels in Pretoria.

Aside from his business life, Monkam was polygamous, with five wives: Jeanne, Jacqueline, Jeannette, Dorothée and Chantal. He fathered sixteen children, including Paris and London Bar member Alain-Christian Monkam.

In 2019, President of Cameroon Paul Biya awarded Monkam a Grand Cordon of the Order of Valour.

In 2021, Monkam was taken to South Africa as part of a medical evacuation and placed on a ventilator. On 18 February, rumors of his death were circulated across Cameroon by numerous media outlets. However, hours later, these rumors were debunked by his son, Alain-Christian and by Cameroon Radio Television.

Pascal Monkam died on 27 February 2021 in South Africa at the age of 90.
