= Kouoptamo =

Town and Commune in Cameroon

- Commune and town
- Location in Cameroon
- Coordinates: 5°39′N 10°36′E
- Country: Cameroon
- Time zone: UTC+1 (WAT)

Kouoptamo is a town and commune in Cameroon. It lies to the southeast of the artificial Lake Bamendjing.

== See also ==
- Communes of Cameroon
