= Gidado Idris =

Nigerian civil servant

Secretary to the Government of the Federation
- In office 17 October 1995 – 29 May 1999
- President: Sani Abacha; Abdulsalami Abubakar
- Preceded by: Aminu Saleh
- Succeeded by: Ufot Ekaette

Head of Service
- In office 1993–1999

Clerk of the National Assembly
- In office August 1979 – May 1983

Principal Private Secretary to Northern Premier
- In office 1960–1966

Personal details
- Born: 15 March 1935 Zaria LGA, Kaduna State, Nigeria
- Died: 15 December 2017 (aged 82)
- Children: Aishatu Gidado Idris
- Education: University of Leeds
- Profession: Civil Servant

Alhaji Gidado Idris, GCON (15 March 1935 – 15 December 2017) was a Nigerian civil servant who served as the Secretary to the Government and Head of Service of the federation in Nigeria between the year 1995-1999, during the military regime of General Sani Abacha.

== Background ==
Gidado Idris was born into a family of the Sokoto aristocracy. His name was originally Usman. Gidado, the name by which he was later known, is a Fulani word which means "the beloved". It is usually a nickname.

He derived it from his great grandfather Waziri Gidado dan Laima, the Sokoto Grand Vizier whose dynasty is known as the Gidadawa. Gidado dan Laima was married to Magajiya Halimatu (a daughter of Mallam Musa, the Emir of Zazzau). Another wife was Magajiya Nana Asma'u (a daughter of Sheikh Usman dan Fodio, the first Sultan of Sokoto).

Gidado was born and raised in Zaria, where his ancestors had immigrated at the death of their father Gidado dan Laima to rejoin their maternal family of Mallam Musa, who was serving at the time as the ruler of Zazzau. Their dynasty is known as the Mallawa in Zazzau, Kaduna State .

Since then, the children of Magajiya Halimatu have continued to stay and hold traditional titles in Zaria. Gidado's father was Mallam Idris, the Maáji of Kaciya. Furthermore, his distant cousins - the descendants of Nana Asma'u - have remained the holders of the Sokoto Grand Vizier's title until date. The most notable among them in recent history is Waziri Muhammadu Junaidu.

Gidado had his early education in Zaria. He went to Zaria elementary School from 1942–46, and Zaria Middle School from 1952-1957. He later proceeded to the Institute of Administration, Zaria and University of Leeds in the United Kingdom. He joined the civil service before Nigeria's independence and was in that service until 1999.

== Career ==
He served as Private Secretary to Sir Ahmadu Bello, Sardauna of Sokoto and subsequently served as District Officer (DO) at various times in Benue, Sardauna and Adamawa Provinces of the then Northern Region. He was actually with Sardauna hours before mutinous soldiers assassinated the Premier during the first military coup of January 15, 1966. This career civil servant subsequently served as Permanent Secretary in the defunct North Central State, now Kaduna and Katsina states from 1971-75. He was appointed Secretary to the Constitution Drafting Committee [CDC] under Chief Rotimi Williams in 1975 and in 1976 he served as Secretary to the Constituent Assembly that produced the 1979 Constitution which ushered in the Second Republic. During the four years of the Second Republic [1979-83], Alhaji Gidado Idris also served as Clerk to the National Assembly.

When the military overthrew the Second Republic in December 1983, Gidado resumed his service at the National Institute for Policy and Strategic Studies (NIPSS), Kuru, Jos; was Permanent Secretary in the Federal Ministries of Police Affairs; Aviation and Finance at various times before he was appointed Secretary to the Government of the Federation (SGF) by General Sani Abacha in December 1995.he continued to serve as SGF under General Abdulsalami Abubakar till he retired from public service in 1999. As the SGF he was the engine room of the federal government policies and head of the federal public service that implemented the policies and midwifed the successful transition to civil rule in 1999. Alhaji Gidado Idris also contributed to produce the 254-page 1979 constitution without reconvening the Constituent Assembly for which General Obasanjo awarded him the national honour of CON. After the death of General Sani Abacha on June 8, 1998, it was Alhaji Gidado Idris as the Secretary of the Armed Forces Ruling Council in his position as the Secretary to the Government of the Federation who conducted the stormy meeting of the council where General Abdulsalami Abubakar emerged as the new Head of State in the early hours of June 9, 1998 in Abuja.

Alhaji Gidado Idris was one of the last Nigerian civil servants who underwent their tutelage under the British, under the pioneering civil servants and the political leaders of the First Republic. He was also one of the longest serving public servants in Nigeria, who served for five full decades.

== Personal life ==
Gidado Idris married three wives: Rabiat, Hajiya Abu And Maryam. His first wife Rabiat died in 1977, while Hajiya Abu is divorced and Maryam is alive. He had 12 children. His most notable daughter is Aishatu Gidado Idris, who is a writer. He forged many friendships and relationships throughout his life. He was an in-law to President Shehu Shagari, a trusted friend to Major General Muhammadu Buhari, General Ibrahim Babangida, General Sani Abacha, General Abdusalam Abubakar and former Vice President Atiku Abubakar.

He was also close to Shehu Musa Yar'adua and General TY Danjuma of whom he played golf together with since the 70s. Before his death, he was seen in the company of Alhajis Yahaya Salami, Ibrahim Hamza, Yayale Ahmed, Baba Gana Kingibe, and Senator Dangana Indayanko at the IBB golf club, where they played daily.

== Award ==
- Commander of the Order of the Niger (CON)
- Grand Commander of the Order of the Niger (GCON)

== Death ==
Gidado Idris died after a brief illness in an Abuja hospital on a Friday night, 15 December 2017.
