= Gervais Mendo Ze =

Cameroonian academic and linguist (1944–2021)

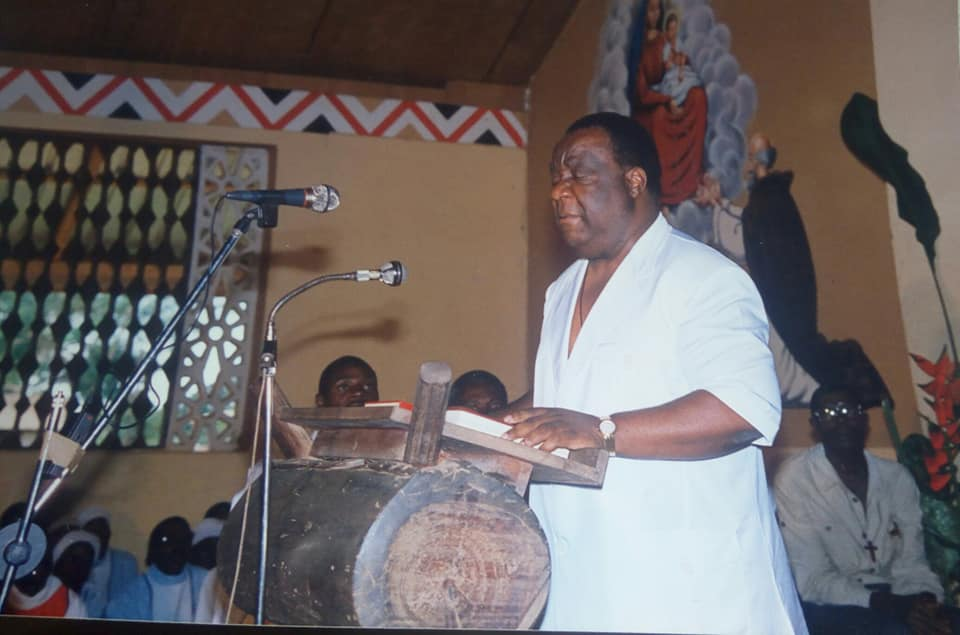
- Born: 25 December 1944; Meyomessala, French Cameroon
- Died: 9 April 2021 (aged 76); Yaoundé, Cameroon
- Occupations: Linguist; Academic

Gervais Mendo Ze (25 December 1944 – 9 April 2021) was a Cameroonian linguist, academic, author, and government official. He directed Cameroon Radio Television from 1988 to 2005.

== Biography ==
Born in Meyomessala, Gervais Mendo Ze attended the University of Yaoundé, earning a Diplôme d’études supérieures spécialisées in 1973. He earned a doctorate in 1984 in Bordeaux. A university professor, he then became Director of Cameroon Radio Television, serving from 1988 to 2005. He was a Minister Delegate at Cameroon's Ministry of Communication from 2004 to 2007.

He was imprisoned in Yaoundé in November 2014 for misappropriation of public funds and sentenced with 20 years of jail. In 2021, his health began to deteriorate. The founder of the choir "La Voix du cénacle", he also wrote many books on the French language and political science.

Gervais Mendo Ze died in Yaoundé on 9 April 2021 at the age of 76 following a long illness.
