= Titus Edzoa =

Cameroonian politician

Titus Edzoa (born 4 January 1945) is a Cameroonian politician. He served as Secretary-General of the Presidency of the Republic and Minister of Public Health before announcing his candidacy for the 1997 presidential election; subsequently he was sentenced to 15 years imprisonment for embezzlement of public funds.

In 1997, shortly after announcing his intention to stand as a presidential candidate against President Paul Biya, Edzoa was arrested for alleged embezzlement, and promptly sentenced to 15 years in prison. The Court of Appeals in Yaoundé upheld the convictions and sentences in 1999. Edzoa sent a delegation to President Biya on 25 May 2001, seeking a pardon; Biya was, however, unwilling to consider the matter unless he received a written request, and Edzoa was unwilling to write such a request because he suspected that it might be used against him.

Edzoa was reportedly kept in difficult conditions at the maximum security gendarmerie headquarters. Still imprisoned, he sought to be taken to Europe for medical treatment in 2003, but that was not permitted. However, he was released on 25 February 2014 after spending more than 17 years in Jail.

When his prison term was about to end, the supreme court slammed another 20-year jail term on Professor Titus Edzoa. Presided over by Justice Marc Ombala Ateba on December 17, 2013, the court simply upheld the lower court’s decision that slammed a 20-year jail term each on the Titus Edzo.

On the eve of the celebration of the reunification of Cameroon in February 2014 in Buea, President Paul Biya signed a presidential clemency from which Titus Ezoa benefit. He walked free from prison on February 25, 2014
