= Collège de la Retraite =

Catholic institution in Yaoundé, Cameroon

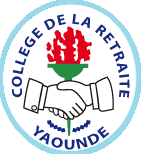

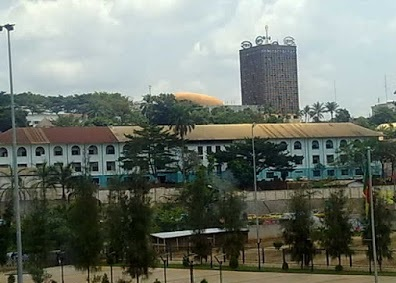
- The Collège de la Retraite as seen from the Palais des Sports de Yaoundé

Location
- 159, Avenue Konrad Adenauer; Yaoundé; Cameroon; 3.873550°N 11.514523°E

Information
- Type: Private Catholic secondary school
- Motto: Discipline-Study-Charity
- Established: 1950
- Founder: Sisters of the Holy Spirit
- Principal: Rev. Father Clément Nkodo Manga
- Grades: From sixth grade to twelfth grade
- Language: French (instruction), English, Spanish, German, Greek, and Latin (studied)
- Affiliations: Regina Mundi-Ora pro Nobis

The Collège de la Retraite is a bilingual secondary school in Yaoundé, the capital of Cameroon. It is a Catholic institution managed by religious leaders.

Founded in 1950 by the Sisters of the Holy Spirit under the name Collège du Saint-Esprit, it initially admitted only girls. In 1960, the Cameroon welcomed the Sisters of the Retraite, who were heavily involved in education. Consequently, the school was renamed Collège de la Retraite.

Collège de la Retraite has one of the highest success rates in the Baccalauréat examinations in Cameroon. It regularly ranks at the top of the annual list of high schools established by the Office du Baccalauréat du Cameroun (OBC), and it consistently appears at the top of the national honors list for baccalauréat distinctions, last published in February 2015.

== History ==
The Collège de la Retraite was founded in 1950 by the Sisters of the Holy Spirit under the name Collège du Saint-Esprit, initially admitting only girls, all of whom resided in a boarding facility. In 1960, Cameroon welcomed the Sisters of the Retraite, who took over management of the Collège du Saint-Esprit, leading to its renaming to Collège de la Retraite. From that year onwards, the school became co-educational.

From 1950 to 2000, the Collège de la Retraite primarily focused on literature and economic courses. In 2000, with the departure of the sisters and management taken over by Cameroonians through the Archdiocese of Yaoundé, the school introduced a scientific curriculum, becoming a full-cycle secondary school.

== Administration ==
- Clément Mathieu Belinga (1977–1991)
- Armand Messi Essam (1991–1998)
- Marie-Hélène Mbarga (1998–2006)
- Rev. Sr. Joséphine Julie Ntsama (2006–2011)
- Rev. Father Abraham Ndongo Minkala (2011–2014)
- Rev. Father Clément Nkodo Manga (since 2014)

== Achievements ==
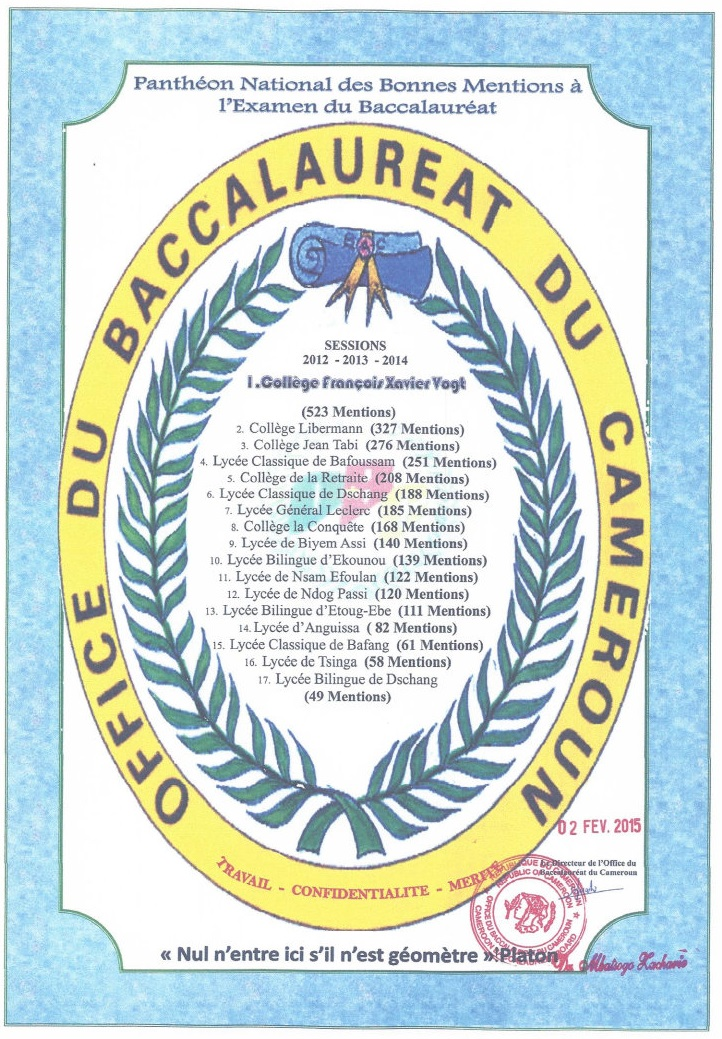
National honors list for baccalauréat distinctions.

Since its establishment, Collège de la Retraite has consistently ranked among the top schools according to the baccalauréat office's rankings. The lowest position it has held was fourteenth in 2006.

Each year, the school presents around 900 candidates for official exams administered by the OBC and is regularly the school with the most candidates among the top 15 in the rankings.

== Notable alumni ==
- Jacques Fame Ndongo, Minister of Higher Education.
- Franck Biya, son of the current President of Cameroon, Paul Biya.
- Pit Baccardi, French-Cameroonian rapper and producer.
- Ntonga Gabriel Charly, Secretary of Foreign Affairs at the Cameroon Embassy in People's Republic of China (Beijing), previously serving in the Central Administration.
- Mamane, Nigerien comedian and RFI columnist.
- Fernand Didier Manga, Cameroonian architect and publisher of A2 Africa&Architettura, a monthly magazine on African architecture and urbanism in Italy. Consultant at the Inter-university Center for Didactic Research and Advanced Training in Venice.

== See also ==
- Archdiocese of Yaoundé
