= Santchou =

Coordinates: 5°17′N 9°59′E

Santchou San-Nzoh
- Commune and town
- Interactive map of Santchou
- Country: Cameroon
- Region: West region
- Department: Menoua
- District: Upper Mungo
- Time zone: UTC+1 (WAT)

Santchou is a town and commune in Cameroon.

It is located in the Menoua division of the West region of Cameroon. It is a multicultural area made up of 55% of Bamileke and 40% o the Mbo people; this is reflected in the name. (Note: Santchou in the local dialect is pronounced San-nzoh, meaning father (San) of elephants (nzoh).) It is located on a plain and it is part of the region known as the Plain des Mbo. It is bordered to the north by mount manengouba to the south by the cliff of Dschang and to the east by Kekem.

== Villages ==
Sanzo is made up of several villages, these include: Nfontsam, Ngwatta, bamia, Fougwo, Mboukock, Bebong, Moyong, Mankang, Bale, Ngang, Mokot, Nden-Matock, Mbokou, Mbongo, Mogot, Nganzon, Nteingue, Nfowang and Njijang. Each village is run by a committee of elders headed by a chief.

The commune of Santchou is made up of three groups namely group Fombap LEZAP, this multicultural village predominantly Bamileke. it is composed of the small villages such as Nganzom, Mabe; and Fombap, Nsala.

Village Fondenera, it is a village on the mountain. the population is economically most dynamic in Santchou.

== Economy ==
It was once a thriving agricultural town due to the presence of the rice cultivation and research company (SODERIM) created in 1978 to improve rice production that was slowly becoming a staple food for the Cameroonian people. This company accounted for most of the economic activity in the town and also was responsible for the rapid population expansion in this town in the early to late 80s from about 15,000 to approximately 25,000 people. This also attracted other ethnic groups to the town predominantly the Bamilekes who resided in the surrounding towns and villages. The bamileke took advantage of this rapid population growth to open other businesses within the town.

Due to lack of investment, poor road infrastructure, inadequate management and planning, the rice cultivation company was closed and this greatly affected the town's economy.

Most recently though the vibrancy in the town has returned due to the completion of the Melong to Dschang road with the town acting as a major transport hub for people travelling to Bamenda and other parts of the North West region of Cameroon.

About 80% of the population is made of subsistence farmers such as Claude Mounde growing food crops such as cocoyam, cassava, beans, maize. plantain, banana etc. Some are also engage in growing cash crops such as cocoa and coffee which act as a major source of income for these individuals.

== See also ==
- Communes of Cameroon
- Ambazonia
