= COVID-19 pandemic in Cameroon =

Aspect of viral disease pandemic

- Disease: COVID-19
- Pathogen: SARS-CoV-2
- Location: Cameroon
- First outbreak: Wuhan, China
- Index case: Yaoundé
- Arrival date: 6 March 2020 (6 years, 7 months, 3 weeks and 1 day)
- Confirmed cases: 125,325 (updated 18 September 2026)
- Deaths: 1,974 (updated 18 September 2026)
- Territories: Bafoussam, Douala & Yaounde

Government website
- covid19.minsante.cm

The COVID-19 pandemic in Cameroon was a part of the worldwide pandemic of coronavirus disease 2019 (COVID-19) caused by severe acute respiratory syndrome coronavirus 2 (SARS-CoV-2). The virus was confirmed to have reached Cameroon on 6 March 2020.

== Background ==
On 12 January 2020, the World Health Organization (WHO) confirmed that a novel coronavirus was the cause of a respiratory illness in a cluster of people in Wuhan, Hubei, China, which was reported to the WHO on 31 December 2019.

The case fatality ratio for COVID-19 has been much lower than SARS of 2003, but the transmission has been significantly greater, with a significant total death toll. Model-based simulations for Cameroon indicate that the 95% confidence interval for the time-varying reproduction number R_{t} has been stable around 1.0 since August 2020.

== Timeline ==
=== Active cases ===
==== March 2020 ====
- The COVID-19 pandemic was confirmed to have spread to Cameroon, Central Africa on 6 March with its first confirmed case. The infected person is a French national who arrived in the capital Yaoundé 24 February.
- The second case in the country was announced on 6 March. The case was a Cameroonian citizen who was in close contact with the first case, but officials did not release any further information on the case.
- Five new cases were confirmed on 18 March. Although further information about the victims was not published, one of the confirmed victims is a foreigner.
- The Minister of Public Health, Dr. Malachie Manaouda, revealed on 23 March that among the 16 cases tested positive that morning, 9 were from Douala, 6 in Yaoundé, and one in Bafoussam.
- On 27 March, the total number of COVID-19 cases in Cameroon reached 91 with the break down per areas as: 63 in Yaounde, 25 in Douala and 3 in Bafoussam.
- The total number of COVID-19 cases keep climbing up in the country. On 30 March, the Minister of Public Health announced that Cameroon had 142 active cases with 6 deaths.

==== April to June 2020 ====
- The number of confirmed cases climbed to 1,832 in April. The number of recovered patients increased to 934, with 837 active cases at the end of the month.
- On 5 May, Cameroon had 2,104 confirmed cases and 64 deaths.
- There were 4,072 new cases in May, raising the total number of confirmed cases to 5,904. The number of recovered patients increased to 3,568. There were 2,145 active cases at the end of the month.
- During June there were 6,688 new cases, bringing the total number of confirmed cases to 12,592. The number of recovered patients increased to 10,100. There were 2,179 active cases at the end of the month.

==== July to September 2020 ====
- There were 4,663 new cases in July, raising the total number of confirmed cases to 17,255. The number of recovered patients increased by 5,220 to 15,320. There were 1,544 active cases at the end of the month, a decrease by 29% from the end of June.
- There were 1,887 new cases in August, bringing the total number of confirmed cases to 19,142. There were 1,080 active cases at the end of the month.
- There were 1,696 new cases in September, bringing the total number of confirmed cases to 20,838. There were 901 active cases at the end of the month.

==== October to December 2020 ====
- There were 955 new cases in October, bringing the total number of confirmed cases to 21,793. There were 1,250 active cases at the end of the month.
- There were 2,086 new cases in November, bringing the total number of confirmed cases to 24,189.
- There were 2,088 new cases in December, taking the total number of confirmed cases to 26,277.

==== January to March 2021 ====
- There were 3,340 new cases in January, taking the total number of confirmed cases to 29,617.
- There were 6,097 new cases in February, taking the total number of confirmed cases to 35,714.
- There were 11,955 new cases in March, taking the total number of confirmed cases to 47,669.

==== April to June 2021 ====
- There were 22,938 new cases in April, taking the total number of confirmed cases to 70,607.
- There were 8,322 new cases in May, taking the total number of confirmed cases to 78,929.
- There were 1,929 new cases in June, taking the total number of confirmed cases to 80,858.

==== July to September 2021 ====
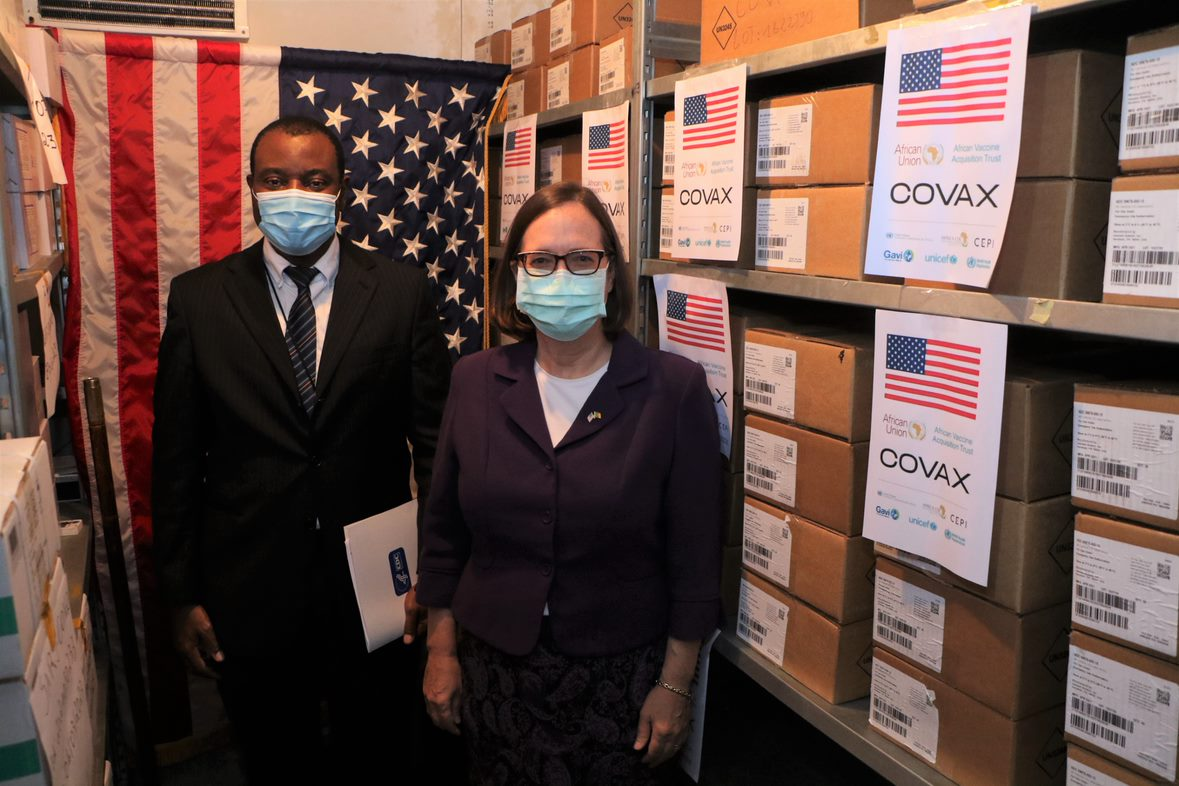
The US donates Janssen COVID-19 vaccines to Cameroon as part of the COVAX initiative in 2021

- There were 1,206 new cases in July, taking the total number of confirmed cases to 82,064.
- There were 1,361 new cases in August, bringing the total number of confirmed cases to 83,425.
- There were 8,878 new cases in September, raising the total number of confirmed cases to 92,303.

==== October to December 2021 ====
- There were 10,196 new cases in October, raising the total number of confirmed cases to 102,499.
- There were 4,649 new cases in November, raising the total number of confirmed cases to 107,148.
- There were 2,219 new cases in December, raising the total number of confirmed cases to 109,367. Modelling by WHO's Regional Office for Africa suggests that due to under-reporting, the true cumulative number of infections by the end of 2021 was around 11.9 million.

==== January to March 2022 ====
- There were 7,351 new cases in January, raising the total number of confirmed cases to 116,718.
- There were 2,389 new cases in February, bringing the total number of confirmed cases to 119,107.
- There were 437 new cases in March, bringing the total number of confirmed cases to 119,544.

==== April to June 2022 ====
- There were 236 new cases in April, bringing the total number of confirmed cases to 119,780.
- There were 167 new cases in May, bringing the total number of confirmed cases to 119,947.
- There were 121 new cases in June, bringing the total number of confirmed cases to 120,068.

==== July to December 2022 ====
- There were 152 new cases in July, bringing the total number of confirmed cases to 120,220.
- There were 1,432 new cases in August, bringing the total number of confirmed cases to 121,652.
- There were 977 new cases in September, bringing the total number of confirmed cases to 122,629.
- There were 1,458 new cases in November, bringing the total number of confirmed cases to 124,087.
- There were 101 new cases in December, bringing the total number of confirmed cases to 124,188.

==== 2023 ====
- There were 1,054 confirmed cases in 2023, bringing the total number of cases to 125,242.

=== Deaths ===
==== March 2020 ====
- The first death occurred on 24 March, the deceased was the famous saxophonist Manu Dibango. By the end of March six persons had died from COVID-19.

==== April to June 2020 ====
- There were 55 deaths in April, bringing the death toll to 61.
- There were 130 deaths in May, bringing the death toll to 191.
- There were 122 reported deaths in June, bringing the reported death toll to 313.

==== July to September 2020 ====
- There were 78 reported deaths in July, bringing the reported death toll to 391.
- There were 20 reported deaths in August, bringing the reported death toll to 411.
- There were seven reported deaths in September, bringing the reported death toll to 418.

==== October to December 2020 ====
- There were eight reported deaths in October, bringing the death toll to 426.
- There were eleven reported deaths in November, bringing the death toll to 437.
- There were eleven reported deaths in December, taking the death toll to 448.

==== January to March 2021 ====
- There were 14 reported deaths in January, taking the death toll to 462.
- There were 89 reported deaths in February, taking the death toll to 551.
- There were 170 reported deaths in March, taking the death toll to 721.

==== April to June 2021 ====
- There were 343 reported deaths in April, taking the death toll to 1064.
- There were 211 reported deaths in May, taking the death toll to 1275.
- There were 49 reported deaths in June, taking the death toll to 1324.

==== July to September 2021 ====
- There were 10 reported deaths in July, taking the death toll to 1334.
- There were 16 reported deaths in August, bringing the death toll to 1350.
- There were 109 reported deaths in September, bringing the death toll to 1459.

==== October to December 2021 ====
- There were 227 reported deaths in October, bringing the death toll to 1686.
- There were 118 reported deaths in November, bringing the death toll to 1804.
- There were 47 reported deaths in December, bringing the death toll to 1851. Modelling by WHO's Regional Office for Africa suggests that due to under-reporting, the true number of COVID-19 deaths by end of 2021 was around 8242.

==== January to March 2022 ====
- There were 29 reported deaths in January, bringing the death toll to 1880.
- There were 40 reported deaths in February, bringing the death toll to 1920.
- There were seven reported deaths in March, bringing the death toll to 1927.

==== April to June 2022 ====
- No deaths were reported in April.
- There were three reported deaths in May, bringing the death toll to 1930.
- One death was reported in June, bringing the death toll to 1931.

==== July to December 2022 ====
- No deaths were reported in July.
- Four deaths were reported in August, bringing the death toll to 1935.
- There were 25 reported deaths in September, bringing the death toll to 1960.
- Five deaths were reported in November, bringing the death toll to 1965.
- No deaths were reported in December.

==== 2023 ====
- Nine deaths were reported in 2023, bringing the death toll to 1974.

=== Medical supply donations ===
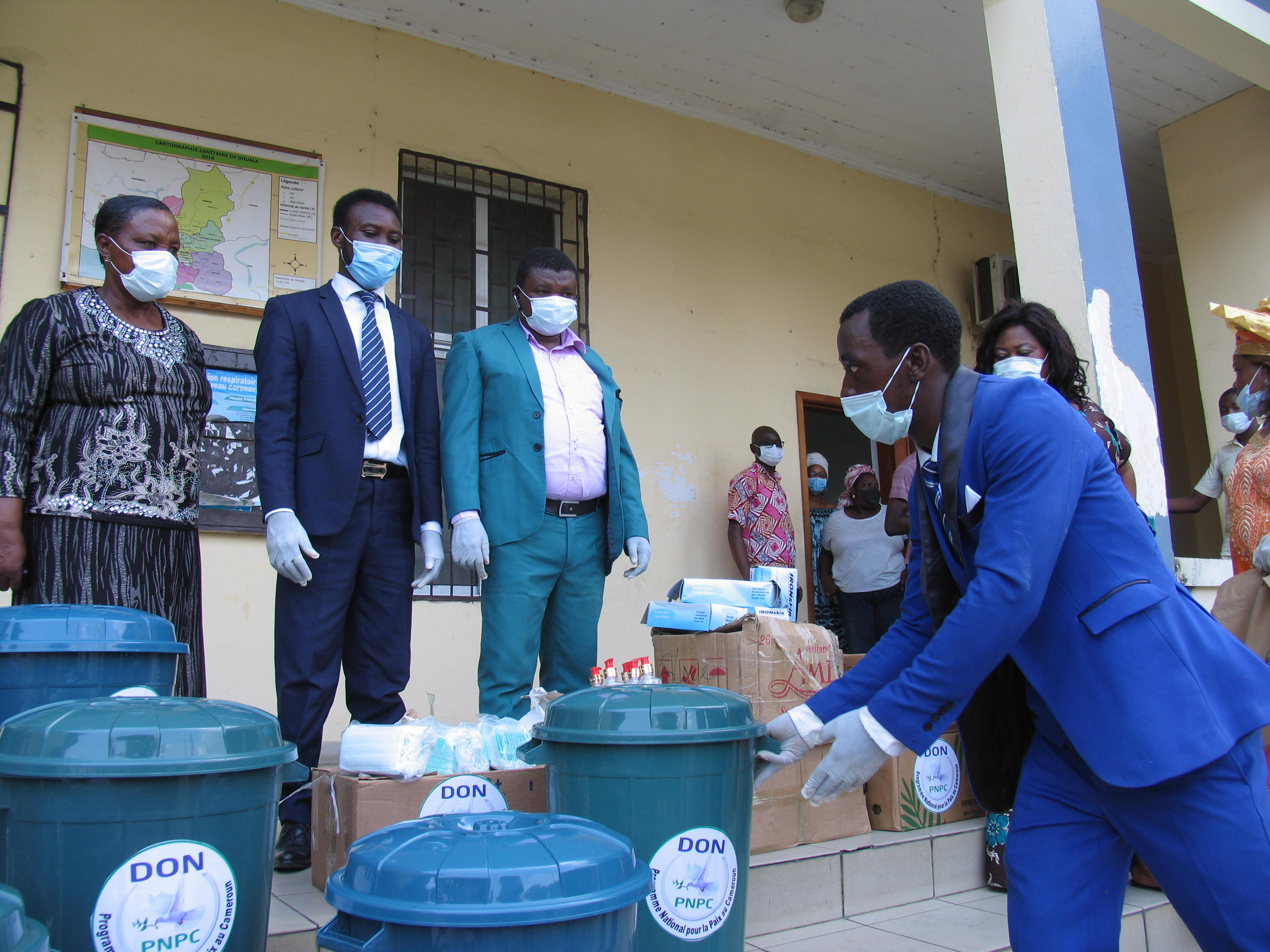
Medical supply donations being delivered

Jack Ma donated medical supplies (20,000 test kits, 100,000 masks and 1,000 medical-use protective suits and face shields) to Cameroon to assist the efforts to fight the COVID-19 pandemic in Africa. The supplies arrived at Cameroon's Yaounde Nsimalen Airport on 27 March 2020.

Samuel Eto'o gave 50,000 facial protection masks to taxi drivers in his country.

Vaccination started on 12 April 2021, initially with 200,000 doses of the Sinopharm BIBP vaccine donated by China.

== Statistics ==
=== New cases ===
View source data.

=== New deaths ===
View source data.

== Government measures ==
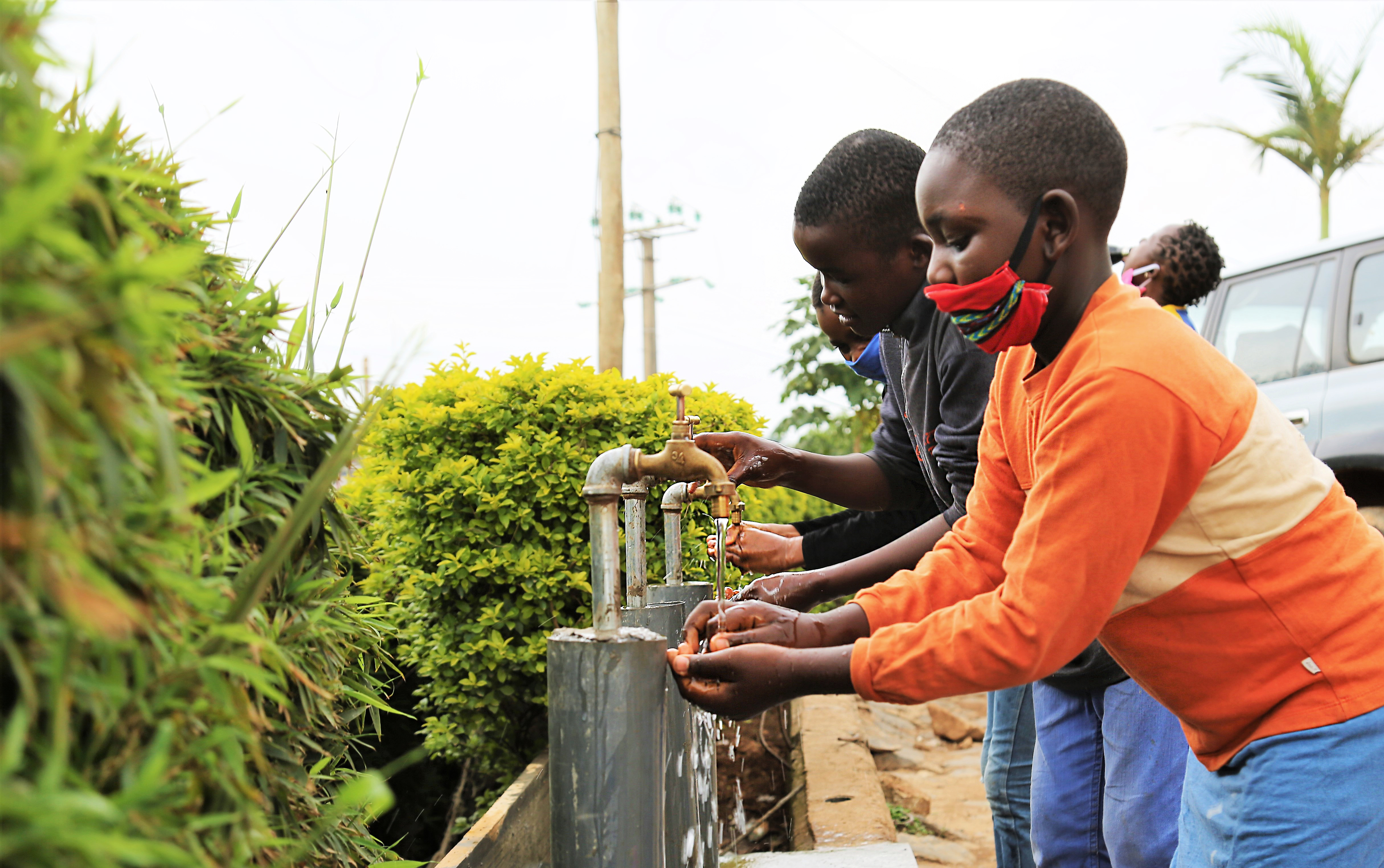
Hand Hygiene becomes an Imperative for kids in rural Cameroon

On 18 March, Cameroonian Prime Minister Joseph Dion Ngute closed its land, air and sea borders.

On 30 March, the Minister of Health announced the imminent launch of a coronavirus test campaign in the city of Douala. Dedicated teams will go door-to-door in the economic capital from April 2 to 6, says the minister.

On 7 April, the Cameroonian government has suspended calls for public generosity in the fight against COVID-19, a move that attracted criticism over political motives.

On 10 April, the government took 7 additional measures to stop the spread of COVID-19 in Cameroon. These measures take effect from Monday, 13 April 2020.

- Measure 1: Wearing a mask in all areas open to the public;
- Measure 2: Local production of drugs, screening tests, protective masks and hydro-alcoholic gels;
- Measure 3: Establishment of specialized COVID-19 treatment centers in all regional capitals;
- Measure 4: Intensification of the screening campaign with the collaboration of the Center Pasteur;
- Measure 5: Intensification of the awareness campaign in urban and rural areas in both official languages;
- Measure 6: Continuation of activities essential to the economy in strict compliance with the directives of March 17, 2020;
- Measure 7: Sanction

On April 15, following the claims of the Human Rights Commission of the Cameroon Bar Association, President Paul Biya announced the release of certain prisoners in connection with COVID-19.

On Tuesday May 5, the Minister of Health announced the provision to healthcare personnel of 50,000 coveralls, 320,000 surgical masks, 220 backpack sprayers, 10,000 pairs of overshoes.

In late June, the government announced that the 2021 Africa Cup of Nations would be postponed until 2022.

== See also ==
- COVID-19 pandemic in Africa
- COVID-19 pandemic by country and territory
- 2020 in Middle Africa
- COVID-19 vaccination in Cameroon
