= Supreme Court of Cameroon =

Coordinates: 3.8700°N 11.5200°E

The Supreme Court (French Cour Suprême) is the highest judicial body in Cameroon. As defined in Article V of the Constitution of Cameroon, the Supreme Court is above the courts of appeal and the tribunals. It is nominally independent of the executive and legislative branches of government, subject only to the oversight of the Higher Judicial Council. The justices are appointed by the president of Cameroon. The court is headquartered in Yaoundé.

The Supreme Court is an appellate court made up of three parts: the judicial, administrative, and audit benches. The judicial bench rules on standard cases appealed from the lower courts. the administrative bench handles cases involving the state, such as election disputes and appellate cases involving the government. This branch can hear such cases on the first instance. The audit bench takes cases relating to public accounts of public and semi-private entities. The Supreme Court may only rule on the constitutionality of law at the behest of the president of Cameroon. The body typically decides appeals only on point of law.

The Supreme Court was founded in 1961 to replace the Federal Court of Justice.

== International relations ==
The Supreme Court is a member of the Association of Supreme Courts of Cassation of Countries Sharing the Use of French (AHJUCAF), the Association of Constitutional Courts of Countries Sharing the Use of French (ACCPUF), the International Association of Supreme Administrative Jurisdictions (IASAJ), the Commonwealth Magistrates and Judges Association (CMJA) and finally the Committee on Economic, Social and Cultural Rights of the United Nations Economic and Social Council .
