= LGBTQ rights in Cameroon =

- Cameroon
- Legal status: Illegal since 1972
- Penalty: Up to 5 years' imprisonment and fines
- Gender identity: No
- Military: No
- Discrimination protections: No

Family rights
- Recognition of relationships: No
- Adoption: No

Lesbian, gay, bisexual, transgender and queer (LGBTQ) people in Cameroon face significant challenges not experienced by non-LGBTQ residents. Both male and female same-sex sexual activity is illegal in Cameroon and LGBTQ people face stigmatization and prevalent discrimination among the broader population. As of 2020, Cameroon "currently prosecutes consensual same sex conduct more aggressively than almost any country in the world".

== History ==
=== Pre-colonial Bafia sexuality ===
In 1921, German ethnographer Günther Teonmann quoted a local calling homosexuality a "national custom" among the Bafia people in his book Die Homosexualität bei den Negern Kameruns. He later on described the three stages of life of a Bafia man, namely:

- kiembe, men who did not have any sexual relationships with women. It starts around 15 years old.
- ntu, men who had sexual relationships with women.
- mbäng, fathers, men who have children.

Kiembe boys were prohibited to have sexual and social contacts with prepubescent girls at the risk of being tortured or enslaved; there was a fierce competition to get the available women. The only option left of those kiembe men was to develop a close male sexual friendship with a lexan, a kiembe boy of a younger or of the same age who is in the same situation, where they would often engage in ji’gele ketön, anal penetration. Before the sexual act, one of the boy would ask the consent of the other person by showing them a basketry plate of earthnuts and say that if they eat one, they consent. This metaphor symbolized the apparent dirtiness of a nut coming from the ground but become sweetness of it upon tasting. These acts could happen anytime, at any place (such as at one of the boys' home) and were seen as normal. For instance, it was not rare for a father to come back home to witness his son performing a sexual act and to laugh it off.

The kiembe and his lexan would help each other to abduct a woman and share her, regardless of her marital status, with the other kiembe people of the settlement so they could all become ntu. This event is seen by many as a turning point that will make the young man win over heterosexual relationships. However, some still continue to be in same-sex relations.

Upon reaching the mbäng stage, the father would often name his newborn after the lexan, regardless of the baby's gender.

Same-sex relations were also seen as the logical extension of intimate adult friendships.

=== 20th century ===
In the 1970s and 1980s, Cameroonian freemasonry became associated with homosexuality, and franc maçon became a common term of abuse for homosexuals.

=== 21st century ===
In 2006, Cameroonian newspapers La Metéo and L’anecdote published lists of "prominent homosexuals" in the country, including members of parliament, a former prime minister, and renowned journalists, both men and women. Along with their names, a blurb was written about each accused person, which often accused them of taking advantage of unemployed youths by coercing them into having sex. Shortly before the publication of the lists, the archbishop of Yaoundé, Monseigneur Victor Tonye Bakot, had echoed warnings about homosexual Cameroonian elite, and criticized the Treaty of Amsterdam, which prohibited sexuality discrimination in European Union member states. President Paul Biya, publicly encouraged respecting the privacy of others but at the same time began to prosecute people accused of engaging in homosexual activity. Few lawyers are willing to defend the accused. The stories boosted newspaper circulation, but were criticized by the state communication council for invading people's privacy.

On June 30, 2024, Brenda Biya, the daughter of the Cameroonian president, Paul Biya, came out as a lesbian after posting an image of her kissing her partner, Brazilian model, Layyons Valença, on Instagram. This sparked backlash in the nation and most Cameroonian users on Instagram had lots of comments in shock and disbelief as they would believe she would be imprisoned or if her father would defend her, the president still has not publicly stated his opinion on her sexual orientation, but this also had sparked a hope for the LGBTQ+ community in Cameroon and had given them some hopes that it will change the nation's anti-LGBTQ+ laws and to give courage to LGBTQ+ Cameroonians in coming out.

== Laws regarding consensual same-sex sexual acts ==
Cameroon's first Penal Code, enacted in 1965, did not criminalise consensual same-sex sexual acts. An ordinance issued in September 1972 by President Ahmadou Ahidjo introduced Article 347bis (now 347–1). This amendment took place a few months after the advent of the unitary state under the new constitution, when the National Assembly had not yet been elected.

The Law on Cybersecurity and Cybercrime (Law No. 2010/012 of 21 December 2010) criminalises online same-sex sexual propositions. Under Article 83(1) any person who makes sexual propositions to a person of their sex through electronic communications shall be punished with imprisonment of one to two years and a fine of 500,000 to 1,000,000 CFA francs or only one of these two penalties. Under Article 83(2) it is established that the penalties are doubled when the proposals have been followed by sexual intercourse.

=== Enforcement ===
In May 2005, 11 men were arrested at a nightclub on suspicion of sodomy, and the government threatened to conduct medical examinations to "prove" their homosexual activity. As of February 2006, nearly all were still being detained, with trials scheduled in March 2006. In April 2006, they were released.

The Advocate estimates that in 2011, at least a dozen men were detained under Section 347. One of these, Jean-Claude Roger Mbede, was arrested by security forces for sending SMS messages to male acquaintance and sentenced to three years' imprisonment at Kondengui Central Prison. The sentence was protested by international human rights organizations including Human Rights Watch and Amnesty International, the latter of which named him a prisoner of conscience. On 24 November 2011, three young men were sentenced to five years' imprisonment for having oral sex in a parked car.

In November 2011, a Cameroonian court convicted two young men who had been arrested for homosexuality outside a nightclub based solely on their appearance and behavior to five years' imprisonment. The presiding judge stated that the way they spoke and their having worn women's clothing and ordered a cream-based liquor was sufficient evidence for homosexuality. An appeals court later overturned the verdict.

In February 2021, two Cameroonian transgender women spent five months in prison after being arrested on February 8 for "wearing women's clothing in a restaurant" in the country's largest city, Douala. The two women were later convicted of "attempted homosexuality, public indecency, and failing to carry identification." A judge ordered the pair, named Shakiro and Patricia, to be released "until a court could hear their appeals." The women received five-year sentences for these crimes. Douala's main prison is described as "hell" by prisoners accused of homosexuality.

== LGBTQ+ advocacy ==
The leading LGBTQ+ defense organization in Cameroon is the Association for the Defense of Homosexuals in Cameroon, or ADEFHO. Alice Nkom, the organization's founder, has defended homosexuals in court since 2005, arguing that they cannot be accused for suspicion of homosexuality, only for acts of same-sex activity. In 2011, ADEFHO was accorded a subvention by the European Union for its defense of homosexuals.

== UK asylum cases ==
A gay Cameroonian man was granted the right to claim asylum in the United Kingdom due to his sexuality in early July 2010. Cameroon's Minister of Communication, Issa Tchiroma Bakary, responded to the court's action by acknowledging that homosexuality was definitely illegal in Cameroon, but also arguing that homosexuals were not prosecuted for their private activities. He dismissed the asylum-seeker's claims, saying that the man had nothing to fear from the law: "Do you think he is the only gay person in Cameroon?"

In August 2011, a gay Cameroonian man was granted temporary immigration bail from the UK Border Agency after Air France refused to carry him to Yaoundé. In May 2012, the UK Border Agency sought to return asylum-seeker Ediage Valerie Ekwedde, finding "no credible evidence" that he was gay, but was forced to keep Ekwedde in custody after he threatened to "make a fuss" on the Air France flight returning him to Cameroon.

== Living conditions ==
A Cameroon court jailed Jean Pierre Amougou Belinga for four months for defaming Grégoire Owona, a government minister named in the list of 50 presumed homosexuals in Cameroon.

The US Department of State's 2010 Human Rights Report found that homosexual people "generally kept a low profile because of the pervasive societal stigma, discrimination, and harassment as well as the possibility of imprisonment. Gays and lesbians suffered from harassment and extortion by law enforcement officials. False allegations of homosexuality were used to harass enemies or to extort money." In 2012, the first association for lesbian and queer women, World Queens, was founded.

== Summary table ==
Same-sex sexual activity legal	No (Penalty: Up to 5 years imprisonment and/or fine)
Equal age of consent	No
Anti-discrimination laws in employment only	No
Anti-discrimination laws in the provision of goods and services	No
Anti-discrimination laws in all other areas (Incl. indirect discrimination, hate speech)	No
Same-sex marriages	No
Recognition of same-sex couples	No
Step-child adoption by same-sex couples	No
Joint adoption by same-sex couples	No
LGBTQ people allowed to serve openly in the military	No
Right to change legal gender	No
Access to IVF for lesbians	No
Commercial surrogacy for gay male couples	No
MSMs allowed to donate blood	No

== See also ==
- Alice Nkom, a leading Cameroonian lawyer working toward the decriminalization of homosexuality in Cameroon
- Human rights in Cameroon
- Joel Gustave Nana Ngongang, a leading African LGBTQ human rights activist from Cameroon
- LGBTQ rights in Africa
- Alternatives-Cameroon, an LGBTQ organization forced to shutdown after a police raid
