= 2025 Cameroonian protests =

Civil unrest in Cameroon

- Part of Gen Z protests
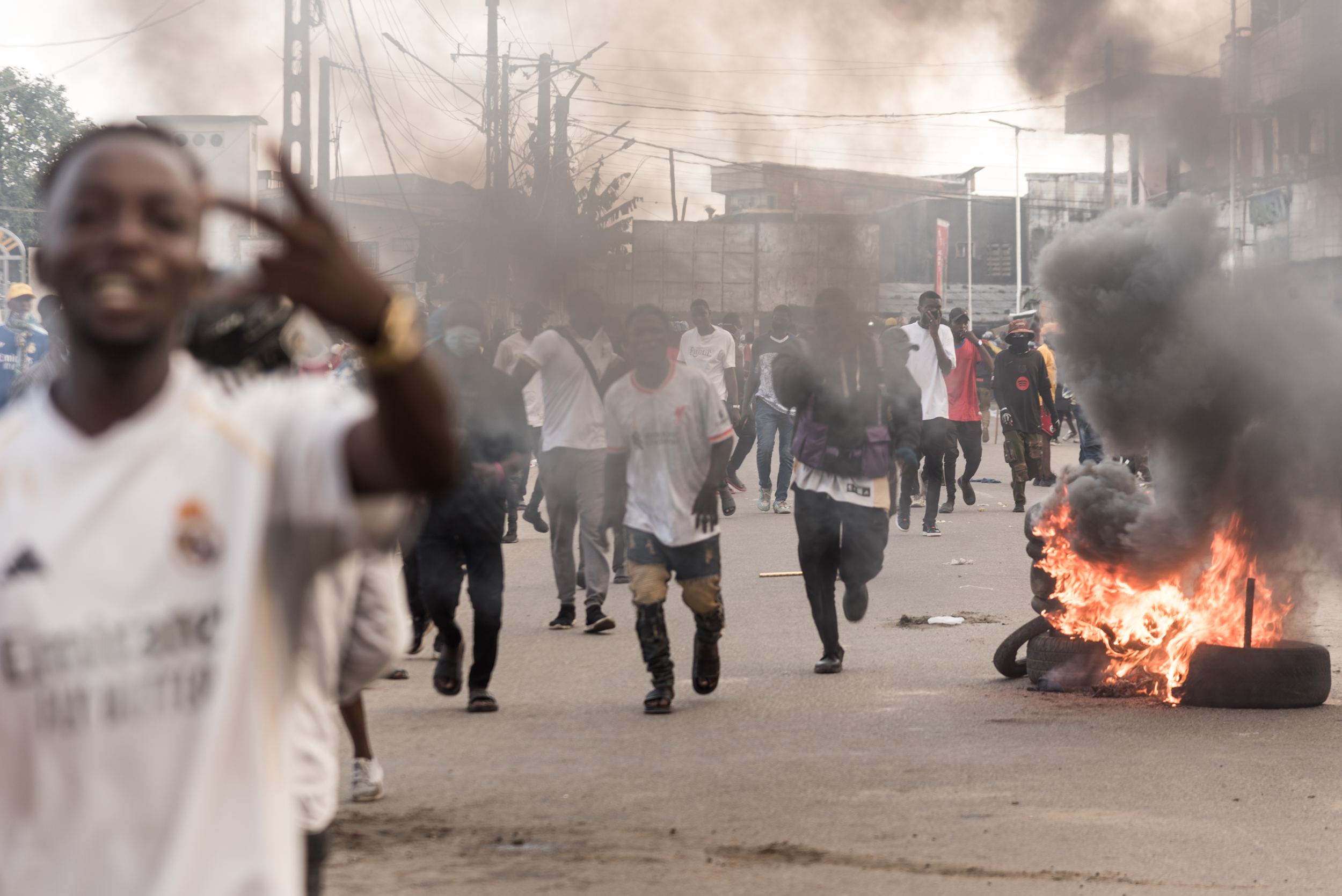
- Post-electoral protests in Douala on 26 October 2025.
- Date: 12 October 2025 – 1 December 2025 (1 month, 2 weeks and 5 days)
- Location: Cameroon
- Caused by: Opposition to the re-election of President Paul Biya; Electoral fraud in the 2025 Cameroonian presidential election; Authoritarianism; Corruption
- Goals: Resignation of Paul Biya government; Official recognition of the victory claimed by Issa Tchiroma
- Result: Failed: Protests crushed; Opposition leader Issa Tchiroma Bakary fled the country; Anicet Ekane dies in custody; Paul Biya remains in power

Parties
Opposition Supported by: Cameroon National Salvation Front; African Movement for New Independence and Democracy	Government of Cameroon; Cameroon Armed Forces; National Gendarmerie; National Police of Cameroon; Cameroon People's Democratic Movement; Supported by: ECCAS

Lead figures
Issa Tchiroma; Saad Kassis-Mohamed; Anicet Ekane †	Paul Biya; Joseph Ngute; Paul Atanga Nji; René Claude Meka; Joseph Beti Assomo

Casualties and losses
- According to Cameroonian government: 16 killed. According to other sources: 30-55 killed by security forces

Casualties
- Arrested: 305

In the aftermath of the 2025 Cameroonian presidential election, protests broke out amid allegations of election fraud.

== Background ==
On 12 October 2025, Cameroon held another presidential election that was set to extend the rule of incumbent Paul Biya, who has been President since 1982, for another seven-year term at the age of 92, making him the oldest sitting head of state in the world. Before the election, Biya was the subject of health concern speculation and left his presidential duties to his trusted party officials and family members as he spent much of his time in Switzerland.

During election day, Biya was expected to face his previous election rival Maurice Kamto of the Cameroon Renaissance Movement who led the opinion polling against Biya. However, Kamto was later disqualified from running due to his party boycott against the 2020 legislative and municipal elections. After Kamto's disqualification, Issa Tchiroma, who was Biya's former government minister, emerged as the new opposition frontrunner to presidency. Tchiroma, who was once a loyalist to the Biya regime, defected to the opposition and ran under Front for the National Salvation of Cameroon banner for the 2025 presidential election due to his disillusionment with the regime. After the election, both Biya and Tchiroma claimed victory despite the delay of the announcement of the election result. The delay of election results sparked allegations of voter fraud and later sparked a nationwide unrest. Biya's regime has been the subject of electoral fraud allegations before, most notably in 1992.

== Timeline ==
=== 12 October ===
The protests first broke out in Garoua when Tchiroma supporters and the Cameroon National Police clashed following the surrounding of Tchiroma's home by the National Gendarmerie. An image on social media showed that protesters were dispersed by tactical vehicles and tear gas. During the clash, there were also report of Gendarmerie vehicles being burned by protesters.

=== 15 October ===
A large scale protest happened on 15 October. In Douala, clashes broke out after allegations of electoral fraud were leveled against Elections Cameroon (Elecam), the national electoral body. Protesters began attacking the Elecam office in Douala and allegedly injured an Elecam worker.

In Dschang, protesters burned the headquarters of the ruling Cameroon People's Democratic Movement. Some reports attributed the arson to protests by supporters of opposition candidate Issa Tchiroma, who alleged the government of President Paul Biya had suppressed dissent and ignored what they claimed was evidence of electoral fraud.

=== 21 October ===
Protests continued in Garoua on 21 October. Clashes occurred between the police and protesters, with protesters starting to throw stones. A woman was said to be killed after police fired guns against protesters.

Protests also occurred in Douala and the national capital Yaoundé. Protests in both cities were met with heavy repression, with police firing tear gas against protesters.

=== 26 October ===
Four opposition protesters were killed after clashes with security forces in Douala while 105 more were arrested.

=== 29 October ===
A total of 23 protestors were killed by security forces and more than 200 people have been arrested, according to civil society groups.

=== 24 November ===
Cameroonian opposition leader Issa Tchiroma Bakary has fled to The Gambia. The Gambian government has said that he fled for his safety.

=== 1 December ===
Anicet Ekane, a 74-year-old opposition politician, leader of the MANIDEM party, died in custody after being arrested a month before during the crackdown. He died after healthcare was denied.

== See also ==
- 2016–17 Cameroonian protests
- 2025 Tanzanian election protests
- List of protests in the 21st century
