= Siwe =

Siwe may refer to:

- Siwé, Benin

== People with the surname ==
- Sture Siwe (1897–1966), Swedish pediatrician who described Letterer–Siwe disease
- Alphonse Siyam Siwe (born 1953), Cameroonian politician
- Lisa Siwe (born 1968), Swedish director
- Tom Siwe (born 1987), Swedish footballer
- Jacques Siwe (born 2001), French footballer

== See also ==
- Siwi (disambiguation)
