= Grégoire Owona =

Cameroonian politician (born 1950)

Minister of Labor and Social Security
- Incumbent
- Assumed office 9 December 2011
- Prime Minister: Philémon Yang; Joseph Ngute
- Preceded by: Robert Nkili

Minister-Delegate at the Presidency for Relations with the Assemblies
- In office 7 December 1997 – 9 December 2011
- Prime Minister: Peter Mafany Musonge; Ephraïm Inoni; Philémon Yang
- Preceded by: Maïdadi Sadou
- Succeeded by: Amadou Ali

Deputy Secretary-General of the Cameroon People's Democratic Movement
- Incumbent
- Assumed office July 1992
- President: Paul Biya
- Secretary-General: Joseph Doumba; René Sadi; Jean Nkuete
- Preceded by: Polycarpe Oyié Ndzíé

Member of the National Assembly for Wouri
- In office 1988–1992

Personal details
- Born: 1950 (age 75–76) Ngomedzap, French Cameroon
- Party: CPDM

Grégoire Owona (born 1950) is a Cameroonian politician who has served as Minister of Labor and Social Security since 2011. He previously served as Minister-Delegate at the Presidency for Relations with the Assemblies from 1997 to 2011, and he has also been Deputy Secretary-General of the Central Committee of the Cameroon People's Democratic Movement since 1992.

== Political career ==
Originally from Ngomezap in Centre Province, Owona was first elected as a municipal councillor in Douala in 1987. He was subsequently elected to the National Assembly in the 1988 parliamentary election as an RDPC candidate in Littoral Province, and he served in the National Assembly from 1988 to 1992; during that time, he was Rapporteur-General of the National Assembly's Finance Commission.

At the time of the March 1992 parliamentary election, Owona said that the RDPC's problem "lies in winning by too great a margin; we would be taken for cheats." He became Deputy Secretary-General of the RDPC Central Committee in July 1992. Following the October 1992 presidential election, in which President Paul Biya was re-elected, Owona criticized what he saw as the excesses of the press: "The current trend in Cameroon is to resort to invective ... and all those who slander and denounce would like the public to see them as heroes, threatened and persecuted." Owona was part of the delegation sent to the January 1993 inauguration of United States President Bill Clinton.

As President of the Technical Committee charged with drafting a new constitution, Owona was considered the author of the draft. On 12 June 1993, he announced that the second draft had been completed. He was also Vice-President of the National Committee of Human Rights and Freedoms during the 1990s.

Owona was appointed as Minister-Delegate at the Presidency for Relations with the Assemblies on 7 December 1997. He remained on the National Committee of Human Rights and Freedoms after his appointment to the government, and some in the opposition pointed to that as evidence of the Committee's lack of impartiality.

Following Biya's appointment of the members of the National Elections Observatory (NEO) on 10 October 2001, Owona, speaking on behalf of the RDPC, praised Biya's choices as wise and called on the members of the NEO to justify the confidence that was placed in them.

Owona denied claims that the Anglophone population was politically marginalized in a January 2003 CNN report, arguing that Anglophones had appropriate representation in the nation's political structures and observing that the Prime Minister was an Anglophone. In March 2003, after Biya visited the United States and met with its President, George W. Bush, at the time of that country's invasion of Iraq, Owona defended the visit, stressing that Biya was working to advance Cameroon's interests. He said that the visit should not be perceived as marking a weakening of Cameroon's relationship with France and that it did not indicate an endorsement of the invasion.

Owona and RDPC Secretary-General Joseph Charles Doumba had a poor relationship; by 2003 they had reportedly not been on speaking terms for years, and Biya was said to primarily work with Owona, while largely ignoring Doumba, who was in poor health.

=== 2006 defamation suit ===
After the newspapers L'Anecdote and Nouvelles d'Afrique—as part of an effort to identify prominent individuals guilty of "deviant behavior"—reported that Owona and about 50 others were homosexuals, he filed a defamation suit in February 2006, along with two doctors who were also identified as homosexual. Although homosexuality was illegal in Cameroon, President Biya said that the newspapers involved in "outing" were acting irresponsibly by basing their reports on rumors and invading the privacy of individuals.

Defending his newspaper in court on 28 February 2006, Jean Pierre Amougou Belinga, the editor of L'Anecdote, presented as evidence an audio recording in which an unidentified person asserted that Owona was guilty of homosexual acts and promised that further evidence was forthcoming. Owona's lawyers scorned the defense's evidence and argued that any responsible journalist would already have meaningful evidence prepared, as they would have used that same evidence in producing their reports. Amougou Belinga acknowledged under questioning that the evidence against Owona was not conclusive but said that his newspaper had only stated that Owona was suspected of homosexuality, rather than asserting it outright. Taking the stand, Owona denied that he had ever engaged in homosexuality and claimed that his reputation had suffered as a result of the newspaper's report. Emphasizing that Owona was interested in restoring his reputation and not in receiving monetary compensation, his lawyers requested only a single CFA franc in symbolic damages. In early March 2006, the judge ruled that Amougou Belinga was guilty of defamation and sentenced him to a four-month prison term; he also ordered Amougou Belinga to pay a fine of one million CFA francs, as well as a single CFA franc to Owona.

=== Events since 2006 ===
Following the February 2006 arrest of several prominent officials—including Alphonse Siyam Siwé, the Minister of Energy and Water—for alleged corruption, Owona said that the arrests had caused some sadness but stressed the RDPC's firm support for Biya's actions.

In response to claims in the press that Biya's mandate as National President of the RDPC had expired, Owona dismissed the claims in an interview with CRTV in early July 2006; he said that Biya's mandate had already been renewed by the RDPC Political Bureau and that an extraordinary party congress would not necessarily be held for that purpose. However, Biya scheduled an extraordinary congress to be held on 21 July soon after Owona gave his interview, and Owona reportedly felt embarrassed that Biya had effectively contradicted his own argument. Due to RDPC Secretary-General Doumba's health problems, which became particularly evident when he spoke at the 2006 extraordinary congress, Owona largely managed party affairs until Biya appointed René Sadi to succeed Doumba on 4 April 2007. On that occasion, Biya also retained Owona in his post as Deputy Secretary-General.

In November 2007, Owona described the government's 2008 budget, which was only 1.1% larger than the 2007 budget, as "realistic", arguing that additional money should not be spent unless there were accomplishments to show that it would be put to good use. Owona chaired the RDPC commission responsible for overseeing events related to the RDPC's 24th anniversary celebrations in 2009.

Following Biya's victory in the October 2011 presidential election, he moved Owona to the post of Minister of Labor and Social Security on 9 December 2011.
