= Human rights in Cameroon =

Human rights in Cameroon are addressed in the constitution. However, the 2009 Human Rights Report by the United States Department of State noted concerns in regard to election irregularities, security forces torture and arbitrary arrests.

== Issues ==
A 2002 report by the UK charity Freedom from Torture said that "The prevalence of torture in Cameroon was such as to warrant a country visit from the United Nations Special Rapporteur on Torture in 1999. He described the use of torture in Cameroon as 'widespread and systematic.'"

In its 2012 Annual Review, Freedom from Torture stated that they had received 33 referrals for torture survivors from Cameroon for clinical treatment or other services.

Amnesty International reported concerns about violence by security forces. In 2009, around 100 civilians were killed during demonstrations.

In April 2010, Germain Cyrille Ngota Ngota, the editor of the Cameroun Express, died in custody at Kondengui Central Prison. He had been jailed pending trial in February 2010 along with the editors of two other newspapers, for the alleged "joint forgery" of the signature of a presidential official. One of the editors said that the document in question had merely been attached to an interview request, whilst the journalist who had originated the document was on the run. "The Federation of African Journalists after visiting the country described Cameroon in May 2010 as 'one of the worst jailers of journalists in Africa'."

As of 2020, Cameroon "currently prosecutes consensual same sex conduct more aggressively than almost any country in the world".

On 27 June 2022, the Human Rights Watch reported that the armed separatist fighters killed and injured people, raped a girl, and committed other grave human rights abuses across Cameroon’s Anglophone regions. The separatists also burned schools, attacked universities, and kidnapped up to 82 people, with no apparent fear of being held to account by either their own leaders or Cameroonian law enforcement.

In March 2024, the NGO Human Rights Watch (HRW) denounced “intense repression” by the Cameroonian government against the opposition, after the government of Paul Biya declared the grouping of its main parties in two platforms “illegal”.

== Historical situation ==
The following table gives Cameroon's ratings since 1972 in the Freedom in the World reports, published annually by Freedom House. A score of 1 is "most free" and 7 is "least free".^{1}

Historical ratings

Year	Political Rights	Civil Liberties	Status	President^{2}
1972	6	4	Partly Free	Ahmadou Ahidjo
1973	6	4	Partly Free	Ahmadou Ahidjo
1974	6	4	Partly Free	Ahmadou Ahidjo
1975	6	4	Partly Free	Ahmadou Ahidjo
1976	7	5	Not Free	Ahmadou Ahidjo
1977	6	5	Not Free	Ahmadou Ahidjo
1978	6	6	Not Free	Ahmadou Ahidjo
1979	6	6	Not Free	Ahmadou Ahidjo
1980	6	6	Not Free	Ahmadou Ahidjo
1981	6	6	Not Free	Ahmadou Ahidjo
1982^{3}	6	6	Not Free	Ahmadou Ahidjo
1983	6	6	Not Free	Paul Biya
1984	6	7	Not Free	Paul Biya
1985	6	7	Not Free	Paul Biya
1986	6	6	Not Free	Paul Biya
1987	6	6	Not Free	Paul Biya
1988	6	6	Not Free	Paul Biya
1989	6	6	Not Free	Paul Biya
1990	6	6	Not Free	Paul Biya
1991	6	6	Not Free	Paul Biya
1992	6	5	Not Free	Paul Biya
1993	6	5	Not Free	Paul Biya
1994	6	5	Not Free	Paul Biya
1995	7	5	Not Free	Paul Biya
1996	7	5	Not Free	Paul Biya
1997	7	5	Not Free	Paul Biya
1998	7	5	Not Free	Paul Biya
1999	7	6	Not Free	Paul Biya
2000	7	6	Not Free	Paul Biya
2001	6	6	Not Free	Paul Biya
2002	6	6	Not Free	Paul Biya
2003	6	6	Not Free	Paul Biya
2004	6	6	Not Free	Paul Biya
2005	6	6	Not Free	Paul Biya
2006	6	6	Not Free	Paul Biya
2007	6	6	Not Free	Paul Biya
2008	6	6	Not Free	Paul Biya
2009	6	6	Not Free	Paul Biya
2010	6	6	Not Free	Paul Biya
2011	6	6	Not Free	Paul Biya
2012	6	6	Not Free	Paul Biya
2013	6	6	Not Free	Paul Biya
2014	6	6	Not Free	Paul Biya

== International treaties ==
Cameroon's stances on international human rights treaties are as follows:

International treaties

Treaty	Organization	Introduced	Signed	Ratified
Convention on the Prevention and Punishment of the Crime of Genocide	United Nations	1948	-	-
International Convention on the Elimination of All Forms of Racial Discrimination	United Nations	1966	-	1971
International Covenant on Economic, Social and Cultural Rights	United Nations	1966	-	1984
International Covenant on Civil and Political Rights	United Nations	1966	-	1984
First Optional Protocol to the International Covenant on Civil and Political Rights	United Nations	1966	-	1984
Convention on the Non-Applicability of Statutory Limitations to War Crimes and Crimes Against Humanity	United Nations	1968	-	1972
International Convention on the Suppression and Punishment of the Crime of Apartheid	United Nations	1973	-	1976
Convention on the Elimination of All Forms of Discrimination against Women	United Nations	1979	1983	1994
Convention against Torture and Other Cruel, Inhuman or Degrading Treatment or Punishment	United Nations	1984	-	1986
Convention on the Rights of the Child	United Nations	1989	1990	1993
Second Optional Protocol to the International Covenant on Civil and Political Rights, aiming at the abolition of the death penalty	United Nations	1989	-	-
International Convention on the Protection of the Rights of All Migrant Workers and Members of Their Families	United Nations	1990	2009	-
Optional Protocol to the Convention on the Elimination of All Forms of Discrimination against Women	United Nations	1999	-	2005
Optional Protocol to the Convention on the Rights of the Child on the Involvement of Children in Armed Conflict	United Nations	2000	2001	-
Optional Protocol to the Convention on the Rights of the Child on the Sale of Children, Child Prostitution and Child Pornography	United Nations	2000	2001	-
Convention on the Rights of Persons with Disabilities	United Nations	2006	2008	-
Optional Protocol to the Convention on the Rights of Persons with Disabilities	United Nations	2006	2008	-
International Convention for the Protection of All Persons from Enforced Disappearance	United Nations	2006	2007	-
Optional Protocol to the International Covenant on Economic, Social and Cultural Rights	United Nations	2008	-	-
Optional Protocol to the Convention on the Rights of the Child on a Communications Procedure	United Nations	2011	-	-

== See also ==
- Freedom of religion in Cameroon
- Human trafficking in Cameroon
- Internet censorship and surveillance in Cameroon
- LGBT rights in Cameroon

== Notes ==
1. Note that the "Year" signifies the "Year covered". Therefore the information for the year marked 2008 is from the report published in 2009, and so on.
2. As of January 1.
3. The 1982 report covers the year 1981 and the first half of 1982, and the following 1984 report covers the second half of 1982 and the whole of 1983. In the interest of simplicity, these two aberrant "year and a half" reports have been split into three year-long reports through interpolation.
