= Martinez Zogo =

Cameroonian journalist (died 2023)

- Born: Arsène Salomon Mbani Zogo; September 22, 1972; Yaoundé, Cameroon
- Died: January 17, 2023 (aged 50); Near Yaoundé, Cameroon
- Occupations: Journalist, radio presenter
- Years active: –2023
- Employer: Amplitude FM
- Parents: Zogo Moungou Victor (father); Antoinette Essala (mother)

Arsène Salomon Mbani Zogo (22 September 1972 – 17 January 2023), better known as Martinez Zogo, was a Cameroonian journalist and radio presenter known for his radio show Embouteillage, which reported upon government corruption in Cameroon. In January 2023, Zogo was abducted, tortured and assassinated; over twenty members of Cameroon's intelligence service, the Direction générale de la recherche extérieure, have subsequently been arrested for his death, in addition to Jean-Pierre Amougou Belinga, a Cameroonian media magnate.

== Early life ==
Zogo was born on 22 September 1972 in Yaoundé, Cameroon, the son of Antoinette Essala and Zogo Moungou Victor. Zogo's father, a gendarme, was originally from the village of Etam Kouma, near Sa'a in the Lekié department of Centre Region. Zogo grew up in the Essos district of Yaoundé, and played football as a child; he initially considered a career in the sport until an injury caused him to stop playing. After a period as a dancer, he began to host public ceremonies under the pseudonym Martinez, eventually starting to host radio shows, despite having no formal training in journalism.

== Journalism career ==
Zogo started his journalism career as a presenter on Radio Siantou in Yaoundé under the leadership of Rémy N'Gono. In 2006, he was suspended from Radio Siantou and was subsequently hired by Radio Magic FM, where he launched what would become his trademark show, Embouteillage (English: "gridlock"), which primarily focused on investigating cases of corruption involving public figures in Cameroon. In 2011, he left Magic FM for Radio Amplitude FM, where he continued to host Embouteillage.

In December 2017, Zogo became deputy manager of Royal FM; however, he subsequently returned to Amplitude FM, where he continued to host Embouteillage, in addition to serving as the station's manager, until his death.

== Controversies and suspensions ==
=== Suspensions ===
Zogo and Embouteillage were frequently suspended by the Conseil national de la communication (CNC), Cameroon's media regulatory body, due to comments made on the programme.

On 15 February 2015, Zogo was taken off air due to making comments that constituted "a breach of ethics and professional deontology in communication". This followed an allegation he made around government minister Paul Atanga Nji embezzling funds from CAMPOST, Cameroon's national postal service; Nji accused Zogo of "undermining [his] dignity". Zogo subsequently issued an apology to Nji, but Embouteillage was taken off air for one month as a result of the comments.

On 22 September 2017, Zogo was again sanctioned by the CNC following a complaint made by Samuel Eto'o concerning statements Zogo made about Eto'o's "morality and character" in relation to a visit with Gabonese officials pertaining to the 2019 Africa Cup of Nations. Zogo was prohibited from broadcasting for three months.

On 1 July 2019 Zogo, alongside 21 other journalists and media outlets, were sanctioned by the CNC for "unfounded accusations" made against Gervais Bolenga.

=== Criminal prosecution ===
In October 2008, Zogo was prosecuted for reporting on Magic FM that several sports journalists had received the promise of money from Fecafoot if they published articles tarnishing the public image of Augustin Edjoa, the Minister of Sport and Physical Education.

In October 2009, while working for Magic FM, Zogo was sued by musician JP Mélody for defamation.

=== Arrest ===
On 17 January 2020, Zogo was arrested at the studios of Amplitude FM and charged with defamation following a complaint made by Sylvie Biye Essono, the wife of cabinet minister Samuel Mvondo Ayolo. Zogo was accused of cybercrime, invasion of privacy, and blackmail, and was imprisoned at the Kondengui Central Prison. On 26 March 2020, after two months in pre-trial detention, he was sentenced to two months in prison, and was released for time served.

== Abduction and assassination ==
On 17 January 2023, while on his way to his home, Zogo was abducted by hooded men. The abduction occurred outside the gendarmerie in Nkol-Nkondi, Yaoundé, at around 20:00; it was believed Zogo was attempting to enter the station to escape his kidnappers. Gendarmes subsequently found Zogo's damaged car, which appeared to have been driven into a gate. Following his abduction, it was reported that Zogo's home had been seen being observed by unknown individuals late at night; Zogo's wife's car was damaged twice after his disappearance, and had also been involved in a crash two days prior to his disappearance.

In the days following Zogo's abduction, Rémy N'Gono reported that Zogo had been tortured and murdered. On 22 January 2023, his body was found in Ebogo, around 15km from Yaoundé. Zogo's body was found naked and in an advanced state of decomposition; his body showed signs of torture. His death was subsequently confirmed to Agence France-Presse. Zogo was 50 at the time of his murder. His body was transported to the Central Hospital of Yaoundé, where an autopsy was held. Zogo's body was formally identified by Charly Tchouemou, the editor-in-chief of Amplitude FM, who reported that the body had been found in a field in the early hours of the morning.

== Reaction and investigation ==
Cameroonian politician Kah Walla noted that Zogo's death coincided with a time where Embouteillage was reporting on financial scandals and alleged embezzlement by Cameroonian politicians, including the misuse of state funds pertaining to a government outlet with government connections. Cameroonian-French writer Calixthe Beyala said she was "dejected [and] saddened" by Zogo's assassination.

The Federation of Press Publishers of Cameroon pay tribute to Zogo, and called on Cameroon's Minister of Information René Sadi to demand justice for his assassination. The National Union of Journalists of Cameroon described Zogo's death as a "heinous assassination" and called on media personalities to wear black on 25 January 2023 to commemorate his death.

René Sadi subsequently issued a statement reporting that the government was following the case with interest and would push for an investigation into the circumstances of Zogo's death. Cameroonian journalist Chantal Roger Tuile reported that Zogo had been sexually assaulted, and that his genitalia, fingers, and teeth had been mutilated prior to his death.

Paul Biya appointed Galax Yves Landry Etoga to investigate Zogo's death, and links were drawn between his assassination and his reporting on embezzlement pertaining to the Ministry of Finance; subsequently, by 3 February 2023, 20 members of Cameroon's intelligence service were arrested, with further suspects being reported to have fled Cameroon. Suspects included Léopold Maxime Eko Eko, the head of the Direction générale de la recherche extérieure.

On 6 February 2023, further arrests were made in Yaoundé, including businessman Jean-Pierre Amougou Belinga, journalist Bruno Bidjang, and former colonel Thomas Etoundsi Nsoe. Lieutenant Colonel Justin Danwe, the executive of the DGRE, alleged the operation targeting Zogo had been carried out on Belinga's behalf. While Belinga's newspaper L'Anecdote initially calmed for calm and stated that Belinga's arrest was "routine procedure", he was subsequently formally implicated in Zogo's assassination. At a military court hearing on 14 February 2023, Belinga was not formally charged after the tribunal ordered an additional investigation to take place to establish criminal responsibilities pertaining to Zogo's assassination. On 4 March 2023, Belinga was charged with complicity in torture.

Journalist Xavier Messe was forced by investigators to disclose information about his sources regarding Zogo's death, raising concerns around the ethics of making journalists reveal the identities of their sources.

In February 2023, Zogo's widow Diane reported that she had been threatened by two vehicles following her while driving in Yaoundé. Diane Zogo has stated she will not permit her husband's body to be buried until the government releases the findings of its investigations into his death.

The killing of Martinez Zogo was condemned by the Director-General of UNESCO Audrey Azoulay in a press-release published on 24 January 2023.UNESCO’s mandate to “promote the free flow of ideas by word and image” includes the protection of journalists and media workers against any forms of attacks and reprisals related to their duties. The facts and circumstances surrounding this killing are categorized and archived online on UNESCO’s Observatory of Killed Journalists. The Observatory archives publicly accessible information on all the journalists killed in relation to their duties since 1997, where the Director-General has issued a condemnation.

On March 1, 2024, the Yaoundé military court closed the judicial investigation into the assassination of Martinez Zogo. The twenty or so people charged were all referred to court on various charges.

On May 27, 2024, the 4th hearing is held at the military court in the trial of the Martinez Zogo case. The two civil parties, namely that of the Zogo family, are rejected, two requests, that of removing the seal from the body for burial purposes and that of transmitting the investigation file to the defense lawyers. On August 19, 2024, the court rejected the request for a stay filed by several parties; the court also withdrew the General Directorate of Foreign Intelligence (DGRE) from being a civil party. A hearing takes place on September 9, 2024.

== See also ==
- Ahmed Abba
- John Williams Ntwali
