= Alice Nkom =

Cameroonian lawyer (born 1945)

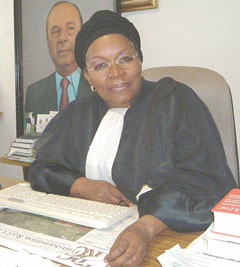
- Alice Nkom (2010)
- Born: 14 January 1945 (age 81); Poutkak, Cameroon
- Occupation: lawyer
- Known for: LGBT advocacy, first black female French-speaking lawyer in Cameroon
- Website: https://cofenho.org

Alice Nkom (born 14 January 1945) is a Cameroonian lawyer, politician, and human rights activist known for her advocacy in defending the rights of LGBTQ+ individuals in Cameroon. She is the first woman in Central Africa to become a lawyer and is noted for her efforts in advocating for the decriminalization of homosexuality in the region.

Nkom began studying law at the Toulouse School of Law at the Toulouse Capitole University, France. She completed her studies at the University of Yaoundé and practices law in Douala, Cameroon, since 1969. At the age of 24, she became the first Black French-speaking woman admitted to the bar in Cameroon. She currently serves as the president of the Central African Human Rights Defenders Network (French: Réseau des défenseurs des droits humains en Afrique centrale, Redhac).

Upon her return from France, Alice Nkom continued her schooling at the University of Yaounde later after her Bar exam, began practicing law in Cameroon in 1969, becoming the attorney of marginalized and discriminated people. She developed a reputation for handling challenging cases, particularly those related to social justice, human rights, and marginalized groups such as LGBTQ+ people

As her career evolved, Nkom increasingly focused on defending the rights of individuals prosecuted under Article 347 bis of the Cameroonian penal code, which criminalizes same‑sex relations. In the course of her work, she met many young and underprivileged people arrested after being reported to authorities or detained during police operations. These cases led her to engage legally to challenge discrimination embedded in national law and in the public perception of same‑sex relationships in Cameroon.

As of 2026, Nkom, in her 80s, continues to mentor younger lawyers. She participates in conferences and discussions related to minority rights and legal ethics. Her continued participation has helped sustain nationwide discussion of the role of law in protecting citizens’ rights. Commentators have described her as a long‑standing figure in Cameroonian legal practice whose career emphasizes access to justice and protection for marginalized individuals.

In recognition of her work, particularly during an "anti-gay crackdown," she was ranked second on The New Yorker's list of "The Eight Most Fascinating Africans of 2012."

== Early life and education ==
Alice Nkom was born in Poutkak, Cameroon, where she spent her early years. She pursued a legal education at the Toulouse Capitole University, France, before returning to complete her studies at the University of Yaoundé and became a licensed attorney at 24, as the first woman lawyer in Cameroon.Alice Nkom, daughter of Martin Nkom Bayi and Alice Ngo Bikang, came from a family of eleven children her parents are originally from the coastal region of Cameroon. She is from the Bassa tribe.

== Career ==
Nkom began her legal career in the 1960s and became known for advocating for marginalized communities. In 2003, she established the Association for the Defense of Homosexuality (ADEFHO), an organization that provides legal and social support to LGBTQ+ individuals in Cameroon, where same-sex relationships are criminalized. Her association pour la Défense des Droits des Homosexuels''' (ADEFHO), also raises awareness about due‑process violations. At the time, homosexuality was widely considered a taboo subject, and few lawyers accepted such cases. The creation of ADEFHO marked a noteworthy moment in rights‑based legal advocacy in Cameroon.

ADEFHO's work attracted national and international attention and support from human‑rights organizations. Nkom organized training sessions for defense attorneys, encouraged courts to apply constitutional protections equally, and took part in media engagements to explain that representing LGBT clients was consistent with commitments to basic human rights. Her legal arguments referenced the Constitution’s guarantees of privacy and equality and drew on regional and international treaties such as the African Charter on Human and Peoples’ Rights and the International Covenant on Civil and Political Rights. These strategies contributed to greater public discussion about the rule of law, even as courts continued to apply Article 347 bis.

Her work on due process and the rule of law brought her into collaboration with other activists involved in democratization, freedom of expression, and gender equality. These connections fostered initiatives combining civic advocacy and justice reform. Within the legal community, she promoted human‑rights education and helped establish partnerships with universities and nongovernmental organizations to train lawyers in the field. Although Cameroon’s courts continue to interpret Article 347 bis strictly, ADEFHO remains active and has sustained national attention on human‑rights issues.

Nkom has represented numerous clients prosecuted under Section 347 bis of the Cameroonian Penal Code, which imposes penalties of up to five years in prison for same-sex relationships. Her work has garnered international attention and support, while also exposing her to challenges such as death threats and efforts to revoke her legal license.

Nkom's most famous case was in 2005 when she defended a group of men who were arrested during a raid of a gay bar in the Cameroon capital city. The men were in prison for a year however in 2006 the UN's working group on Arbitrary Detention reviewed the case and criticized Cameroon for arresting the men because of their sexuality. The UN also labeled the anti-sexuality offenses in Cameroon's Penal Code as a violation of the international human rights laws.

In January 2011, she was threatened with arrest by a representative of Cameroon's Ministry of Communication after ADEFHO was awarded a €300,000 grant by the European Union. Later that year, she represented Jean-Claude Roger Mbede, a man imprisoned for three years for "homosexuality and attempted homosexuality" following a series of SMS messages to a male acquaintance, and who was named a prisoner of conscience by Amnesty International.

In 2006 and 2013, she was a keynote speaker at the Human Rights conferences that took place in conjunction with the OutGames, in Montréal, Canada and Antwerp, Belgium, respectively.

In 2018, she founded and has since been president of the Collectif des Familles d'Enfants Homosexuels (COFENHO) is support of families of LGBTQ people.

In 2022, she was appointed a member of the Permanent Forum on People of African Descent by the United Nations Human Rights Office of which the aim is to fight discrimination against Black and mixed-race people around the world and to develop a legally binding instrument.

== Political positions ==
In March 2020, Paul Atanga Nji, the Minister of Territorial Administration accused Redhac under Nkom's leadership, as well as Human Rights Watch, Amnesty International, and International Crisis Group, of being engaged in a "conspiracy" against Cameroon and security services.

On 6 December 2024, the Minister banned Redhac alongside several other civil rights organisations, citing concerns with its use of funding. On 10 December, Nkom was summoned to a police interview in Wouri after breaking the seal placed on the doors of Redhac's offices in Douala. Nkom did not attend this or subsequent summons, requesting a postponement until January 2025 to guarantee she would be able to have a lawyer present. On 18 December at a military court hearing, Nkom was accused of raising funds to support armed groups in English-speaking regions of Cameroon, and on 31 December she was summoned to an interview with the national gendarmerie's central judicial investigation department. On January 9, 2025, Amnesty International stated that Camarounian authorities, "must end the suspension of the affected organizations, reinstate their status and allow them to carry out their activities without arbitrary interference" and "immediately end the misuse of the justice system to target Alice Nkom and other human rights defenders and activists.”

Nkom stated that, according to observers of the Presidential election of 2025, Issa Tchiroma Bakary should be announced as the President of Camaroun with 70% of the vote. She contested the victory of Paul Biya, citing electoral fraud. According to Marceau Sivieude of Amnesty International’s Regional Director for West and Central Africa, “anyone who dares criticize the authorities, whether a human rights defender, a journalist, a political activist or a protester, runs the risk of being arbitrarily arrested and detained, tortured or otherwise ill-treated, and tried by military courts. Unfortunately, this trend increases as the presidential election approaches.”

Following the November 2025 presidential election in Cameroon, Issa Tchiroma Bakari, who was not elected, appointed 80-year-old lawyer Alice Nkom as his spokesperson while in exile. Alice Nkom participated in the homage to Anicet Ekane, former president of the African Movement for New Independence and Democracy, who died in prison on December 1, 2025. According to Nkom, Anicet Ekane died from a lack of medical care in prison. She also defends Makini Tchameni, wife of the imprisoned opposition figure Djeukam Tchameni, who is a prominent figure of the coalition "L'union pour le changement" that backed Issa Tchiroma Bakary during the last presidential election in Cameroon in her lawsuit.

== Recognition and legacy ==
In March 2014, Alice Nkom was awarded with the "7. Menschenrechtspreis" (7th Human Rights Award) by the German section of Amnesty International.

Alice Nkom’s work on behalf of marginalized communities in Cameroon has received attention at both the national and international levels. Her legal and advocacy efforts have been covered by newspapers, including Cameroon Tribune, Mutations, and Journal du Cameroun, which have profiled her role in human‑rights defense. In 2014, the German section of Amnesty International presented its Human Rights Award (Menschenrechtspreis) jointly to Nkom and Michel Togué in recognition of their legal defense of individuals prosecuted under Article 347 bis.

Researchers have identified Nkom as one of the first Cameroonian lawyers to apply constitutional arguments to sexuality‑related cases. Scholars and human‑rights analysts describe her approach as illustrating how formal legal mechanisms can be used to advance equality and procedural fairness. Within Cameroon, civic organizations and professional associations have acknowledged Nkom’s contribution to the legal profession. Young lawyers have cited her as an influence in combining ethical practice with social commitment. The Cameroonian Bar Association has recognized her decades of practice and contributions to professional ethics, and domestic media often highlight her emphasis on fairness and civil liberties.

Françoise Millogo directed the documentary Coming Out of the Nkuta (2009). This and other films were screened in Cameroon and internationally and introduced audiences to the legal challenges surrounding human rights in the country. Human‑rights organizations continue to mention Nkom’s example when discussing proposals for legal reform. The Amnesty International Annual Report 2023 noted her ongoing work and the broader context of restrictions faced by human‑rights defenders in Cameroon.

National networks, including the Bar Association and the National Commission on Human Rights and Freedoms, have referenced her activities in appeals for professional solidarity. Commentators observe that Nkom’s legacy extends beyond LGBT advocacy; her career reflects broader concerns about access to justice and protection of civil rights. Analysts argue that her work helped normalize public debate about legal equality within a conservative legal system. She has been described by Cameroonian media as “the voice of the voiceless,” noted for a long career of public service.

Nkom has featured in several documentaries about her efforts to defend LGBT people in Cameroon, including Coming out of the Nkuta (2009) and Until it Shines (2022), which depict her meeting clients and mentoring younger lawyers. Her life and work are frequently discussed in studies of African legal development as illustrating the role of individual lawyers in human‑rights reform.

Beyond her national work, Nkom has contributed to regional dialogue among African lawyers and human‑rights defenders. She has participated in seminars on legal reform and has presented recommendations to the African Commission on Human and Peoples’ Rights. Academic publications frequently cite her as an example of the relationship between professional ethics and social responsibility in restrictive legal environments.

== See also ==
- First women lawyers around the world
- Joel Gustave Nana Ngongang, Cameroonian LGBT activist
- LGBT rights in Africa
- LGBT rights in Cameroon
- PFLAG
