= List of universities in Rwanda =

This is a list of universities in Rwanda.

== Post-secondary institutions ==
As at December 2015, there are 34 institutions of higher education in Rwanda, 11 public and 23 private. In 2013, the government of Rwanda merged all public universities, leading to one public university, University of Rwanda, with six colleges.

== Public university ==
- University of Rwanda (UR)
  - College of Agriculture and Veterinary Medicine (CAVM)
  - College of Arts and Social Sciences (CASS)
  - College of Business and Economics (CBE)
  - College of Education (CE)
  - College of Medicine and Health Sciences (CMHS)
  - College of Science and Technology (CST)

== Rwanda Polytechnic Colleges ==
- Rwanda Polytechnic-Gishari College (RP-Gishari College)
- Rwanda Polytechnic-Ngoma College (RP-Ngoma College)
- Rwanda Polytechnic- Kigali College (RP-Kigali)
- Rwanda Polytechnic- Huye College (RP-Huye College)
- Rwanda Polytechnic Karongi College (RP-Karongi College)
- Rwanda Polytechnic-Musanze College (RP-Musanze College)
- Rwanda Polytechnic -Tumba College (RP-Tumba College)
- Rwanda Polytechnic -Kitabi College (RP-Kitabi College)

== Public nursing schools ==
- Byumba School of Nursing And Midwifery
- Kibungo School of Nursing And Midwifery
- Nyagatare School of Nursing And Midwifery
- Rwamagana School of Nursing

== Private universities ==
- Rwanda Institute for Conservation Agriculture (RICA)
- Eastern African Christian College (EACC)
- Kigali Integrated College (KIC)
- University of Kigali (UoK)
- Ruli Higher Institute of Health (RHIH)
- University of Lay Adventists of Kigali (UNILAK)
- Adventist University of Central and East Africa (AUCA)
- African Leadership University (ALU)
- Akilah Institute for Women, Kigali (AIWK)
- East African University Rwanda
- Carnegie Mellon University Rwanda (CMUR)
- Catholic Institute of Kabgayi (ICK)
- Catholic University of Rwanda (CUR)
- Christian University of Rwanda (CHUR). Closed in 2020 by Government of Rwanda.
- Hanika Anglican Integrated Polytechnic (HAIP)
- University Of Kibungo (UNIK)
- Muhabura Integrated Polytechnic College (MIPC)
- Institute of Applied Sciences Ruhengeri (INES)
- Institut Superieur Pedagogique de Gitwe (ISPG)
- Kibogora Polytechnic (KP)
- Premier ECDE Teachers College (PECDTC)
- Kigali Independent University (ULK)
- KIM University
- Mount Kenya University Kigali Campus (MKU Kigali)
- Protestant Institute of Arts & Social Sciences (PIASS)
- University of Tourism, Technology and Business Studies (UTB)
- University of Technology and Arts of Byumba (UTAB)
- University of Global Health Equity

institute catholique de kabgayi(ICK)
