= Christian Penda Ekoka =

Cameroonian government official (1952–2021)

- Born: 21 March 1952; Douala, Cameroon, France
- Died: 8 August 2021 (aged 69)
- Occupation: Government official

Christian Penda Ekoka (21 March 1952 – 8 August 2021) was a Cameroonian government official. He was an advisor to President Paul Biya from 2010 to 2018. In 2018, he supported Maurice Kamto in his unsuccessful candidacy against President Biya.

== Early life and education ==
Ekoka was born on 21 March 1952 in Douala.

Ekoka left studies at the Collège Liberman in Douala before being selected by the Canadian International Development Agency to pursue an engineering degree at Polytechnique Montréal. He then earned graduate degrees from McGill University and Concordia University.

== Professional experience ==
Ekoka returned to Cameroon in 1978 and began a career as an engineer. For 15 years, he was an investment officer and director of studies and projects at the Société nationale d’investissement. In 1991, he began working as a consultant for Insight BDS, specializing in investment advice, industrial policies and strategies, and development of public-private partnership projects.

Ekoka joined the Cameroon People's Democratic Movement (CPDM) in 1996. He advocated against a 7th term for President Biya and for in-depth reforms to Cameroonian democracy. In 2018, he founded the AGIR-ACT movement, which sought to reach potential for its members. In July 2018, while still an advisor to Paul Biya, he announced that he would not support the President in that year's election. Instead, he and AGIRACT supported Maurice Kamto of the Cameroon Renaissance Movement. With this endorsement, a political alliance was created between the two organizations.

On 28 January 2019, Ekoka was arrested in Douala alongside Kamto and Albert Dzongang for organization of peaceful protests in response to the contested results of the 2018 election. They were held for nine months and released in October 2019 without charge.

Christian Penda Ekoka died on 8 August 2021 at the age of 69.
