= List of medical schools in Rwanda =

This is a list of medical schools in Rwanda.

Number	School	Location	Affiliation	Courses	Foundation	Private/Public
1	University of Rwanda School of Medicine	Kigali	University of Rwanda	MBChB	2013	Public
2	University of Gitwe School of Medicine	Gitwe	University of Gitwe	MBChB	2013	Private
3	University of Global Health Equity	Butaro	University of Global Health Equity	MBChB; Master of Global Health Care Delivery	2015	Private
4	Adventist School of Medicine of East-Central Africa	Kigali	Adventist University of Central Africa	MD	2019	Private

== See also ==
- List of universities in Rwanda
- Education in Rwanda
