= Tiriane Balbine Noah =

Cameroonian politician

- Born: 24 July 1980 (age 46)
- Education: University of Yaoundé II
- Occupation: Politician
- Political party: Cameroon Renaissance Movement

Tiriane Balbine Noah is a Cameroonian politician. Tiriane Balbine Noah is the president of the Cameroon Renaissance Movement (MRC).

== Biography ==
=== Early life, education and career ===
Tiriane Balbine Noah was born on 24 July 1980. Tiriane Balbine Noah is a Mfida princess and is originally from the village of Tsinga, in the Akono subdivision of the Centre Region of Cameroon. Tiriane Balbine Noah studied at the University of Yaoundé II, where she obtained a degree in political science.

=== Political career ===
Tiriane Balbine Noah worked as a sales assistant in the construction sector in Yaoundé. Tiriane Balbine Noah was elected second vice-president of the Cameroon Renaissance Movement during the party's convention in April 2018.

Tiriane Balbine Noah also led a condolence delegation to the radio station where journalist Martinez Zogo worked.

=== Personal life ===
Tiriane Balbine Noah has several children.

== See also ==
- Maurice Kamto
- Mamadou Mota
- Cameroon Renaissance Movement
