= Joël Gustave Nana Ngongang =

- Born: 1982; Cameroon
- Died: October 15, 2015 (aged 32–33)
- Other name: Joel Nana
- Education: University of the Western Cape (LLM)
- Occupations: Human rights activist, LGBT rights activist, HIV/AIDS activist
- Employer(s): Partners for Rights and Development (Paridev)
- Known for: LGBT rights advocacy in Africa; HIV/AIDS advocacy

Joël Gustave Nana Ngongang (1982–2015), frequently known as Joel Nana, was a leading African LGBT human rights advocate and HIV/AIDS activist.

== Background ==
Nana's career as a human rights advocate spanned numerous African countries, including Nigeria, Senegal and South Africa, in addition to his native Cameroon. He was the Chief Executive Officer of Partners for Rights and Development (Paridev) a boutique consulting firm on human rights, development and health in Africa at the time of his death. Prior to that position, he was the founding Executive Director of the African Men for Sexual Health and Rights (AMSHeR) an African thought and led coalition of LGBT/MSM organizations working to address the vulnerability of MSM to HIV. Mr Nana worked in various national and international organizations, including the Africa Research and Policy Associate at the International Gay and Lesbian Human Rights Commission (IGLHRC), as a Fellow at Behind the Mask, a Johannesburg-based non-profit media organisation publishing a news website concerning gay and lesbian affairs in Africa, he wrote on numerous topics in the area of African LGBT and HIV/AIDS issues and was a frequent media commentator. Nana died on October 15, 2015, after a brief illness.

== The 'Yaoundé Eleven' ==
Following a raid on a bar in Yaoundé, the capital of Cameroon, in 2005, eleven men were arrested and imprisoned on charges of suspected homosexuality. The lawyer Alice Nkom defended them. Nana was particularly engaged in this issue, dedicating much of his work to publicising the plight of the arrested men. Partially as a result of his efforts, on October 10, 2006, the United Nations Working Group on Arbitrary Detention declared that the detention of the 11 Cameroonian men on the basis of their presumed sexual orientation constituted an arbitrary deprivation of liberty contrary to the International Covenant on Civil and Political Rights.

== Career with African LGBT organisations ==
Nana's career as an LGBT human rights advocate began when he worked with a Cameroonian gay association called AGALES from 1999 until 2001. He later spent time in Nigeria, where he founded an African LGBT advocacy web site, returning to his native Cameroon in part to organise communication and assistance for the imprisoned men. In the spring of 2005, he co-founded, together with two gay activist colleagues, Alternatives-Cameroun, a Cameroon-based human rights organisation working to address homophobia and end discrimination and abuse against lesbians, gay men, bisexual, and transgender individuals.

== Colonialism and an African voice ==
Although much of his career was spent in West Africa, Nana's concerns extended to the whole continent of Africa. "As Africans, we feel the vestiges of the long European colonial presence in our continent," he said. "We feel them when other -- Western, European, 'international' -- LGBT organisations speak on our behalf and we are left unheard. Only Africans can speak for Africans."

Nana also bristled at the oft-cited notion that homosexuality is a foreign, colonial import alien to Africa. He asserted that "neither homosexuality nor homophobia are alien to Africa," as often claimed by anti-LGBTI people and LGBTI activists alike. "While it is important to acknowledge that some of the laws criminalizing same-sex sex in Africa are part of the framework inherited from our past, we should not negate the agency of Africans. This agency is also expressed through love, hate and most importantly through the law" said Nana. "We might not agree with our political leaders and their methods, but one thing we should not lose sight of - and learn from - is the fact that whatever powers influence politics in the corridors, these political leaders (legitimate or not) get to make the final decisions in the legislative process. In so doing they take responsibility and should be held accountable for these decisions."

Nana was a frequent media commentator on LGBT and HIV/AIDS matters, appearing on media outlets ranging from Radio France Internationale (RFI) to Chicago Public Radio.

== Fighting HIV/AIDS ==
His work in the field of HIV and AIDS paralleled his LGBT human rights endeavours. In Cameroon, he was active in various HIV prevention efforts targeting gay and bisexual men—a high-risk group roundly ignored in official Cameroon government HIV prevention campaigns. Focusing on World AIDS Day—December 1 -- Nana coordinated a letter-writing campaign to the health ministries and national AIDS committees of all African countries, encouraging them not to ignore gay and bisexual men in their work.

== Education and personal ==
Nana, who was fluent in English in addition to French, Banso, and Medumba, also studied German and Estonian. Nana obtained his LLM (Master) in International Human Rights Law from the University of the Western Cape was studying towards an LLD at the time of his death.

== See also ==
- Alice Nkom
- Gay rights in Cameroon
- LGBT rights in Africa
- HIV/AIDS in Africa
- Human rights in Africa
- African Charter on Human and Peoples' Rights
