= Léopold Maxime Eko Eko =

Cameroonian Politician

Director General of External Research at the General Directorate of External Research
- In office August 2010 – February 1, 2023
- Succeeded by: Jean-Pierre Robins Ghoumo

Personal details
- Education: Paris-East Créteil University

Léopold Maxime Eko Eko is a Cameroonian politician who served as the director general for external research, the top position in the General Directorate of External Research, Cameroon's intelligence agency, from August 2010 to December 2023. Eko Eko was sacked due to his involvement in the assassination of Martinez Zogo, a Cameroonian radio host.

== Biography ==
Prior to his appointment to the Cameroonian government, Eko Eko served as a police commissioner with a doctorate in information and communication sciences from the Paris-East Créteil University. Eko Eko rose through the ranks of the Cameroonian government through his support of the use of force to suppress dissent. He then served as the director general for external research at the General Delegation for National Security.

Eko Eko was appointed director general for external research at the General Directorate for External Research (DGRE) in August 2010. In 2014, Eko Eko helped kidnap Guerandi Mbara, a Cameroonian general and mastermind of the 1984 Cameroonian coup attempt, from Bulgaria. Mbara was transferred back to Cameroon and disappeared. Eko Eko also commanded Operation Nera 10, which assassinated and targeted the leadership of southern Cameroonian separatist movements in the Anglophone Crisis.

In January 2023, DGRE officers under the orders of Eko Eko assassinated radio broadcaster Martinez Zogo. Zogo was kidnapped and tortured by the DGRE, sparking protests against the Cameroonian officials responsible. Eko Eko's subordinate Justin Danwe was arrested alongside several other officials accused of complicity, and Eko Eko himself was arrested on February 1, 2023. He was indicted on March 4. On August 21, Eko Eko looked visibly emaciated after being tortured in pre-trial detention. During the trial, Eko Eko spoke about his connection with businessman Jean-Pierre Amougou Belinga, who masterminded Zogo's assassination.

Monkouop Mouminou was appointed as Eko Eko's temporary successor in February 2023. In December 2023, Jean-Pierre Robins Ghoumo succeeded Eko Eko as Director General of the DGRE.
