= PURS =

PURS may refer to:

- Republican Socialist Unity Party, a Bolivian political party active between 1946 and 1978
- United People for Social Renovation, Cameroonian political party founded in 2010
