= Jean de Dieu Rurangirwa =

Rwandan politician

Minister of Information, Technology and communication

Jean de Dieu Rurangirwa is the former Minister for Information Technology and Communications (MITEC) of the Republic of Rwanda. He was appointed minister in December 2017 by President Paul Kagame. Prior to this appointment, he was the project coordinator for Integrated Financial Management Information and System (IFMIS), at the Ministry of Finance and Economic Planning.

== Education ==
Rurangirwa completed his bachelor's degree in information systems management from Adventist University of Central Africa, Rwanda, and he is a graduate of the Maastricht School of Management (MSM), Netherlands, where he obtained his Master of Business Administration in project management.
