= Shakiro =

Cameroonian human rights activist (born 1997)

- Born: Njeukam Loïc Midrel; July 29, 1997 (age 28); Douala, Cameroon
- Occupation: LGBT activist
- Known for: LGBT rights activism in Cameroon

Shakiro (born 29 July 1997) is a Cameroonian human rights activist. She became known for talking about her experiences as a transgender woman on social media, including Facebook and YouTube. In 2021, Shakiro was arrested and charged with "attempted homosexuality", and was sentenced to five years in prison. She fled Cameroon later that year, living in hiding in Nigeria before receiving asylum in Belgium in 2023.

== Early life and education ==
Shakiro was born and raised in Douala, to a family originally from Bafang in West Province. She was significantly bullied in school, which led to her leaving; she later graduated from the University of Buea.

== Activism ==
Shakiro became known in Cameroon after she came out as a transgender woman in a social media post. She began regularly posting videos on Facebook and YouTube, including about cosmetics as well as the experiences of LGBTQ people in the country. In many of her videos, Shakiro denounced Cameroon's anti-homosexuality laws.

In 2020, Shakiro was physically assaulted in Douala, following which she temporarily retracted her coming out.

== 2021 arrest and imprisonment ==
On 8 February 2021, Shakiro and another transgender woman, Patricia, were arrested at a restaurant in Douala for wearing women's clothing. They were subsequently interrogated without lawyers present, before being detained in a local prison. Shakiro was raped on multiple occasions during her detention. Alice Nkom went on to represent Shakiro when the case went to trial.

On 1 May 2021, Shakiro and Patricia were found guilty of "attempted homosexuality" and "outraging public decency", in addition to not possessing the correct identification documents. They were sentenced to the maximum five years' imprisonment, in addition to being ordered to pay a 200,000 XAF fine. Nkom described the sentence as a "hammer blow" and stated "the message is clear: homosexuals don't have a place in Cameroon". The human rights organisation Human Rights Watch called on the Cameroonian government to repeal its anti-homosexuality laws and to "stop interfering in Cameroonians' private lives".

== Exile and asylum ==
Shakiro appealed the sentence, which led to her being released from custody on 16 July 2021 while the appeal was considered. On 10 August, Shakiro and another transgender woman were forcibly removed from a taxi in Douala and assaulted by a mob, following which Shakiro left the country. She spent a year living in hiding in Nigeria, during which time she reported presenting as a male to prevent further attacks.

In 2022, while in Nigeria, Shakiro made two social media posts naming Cameroonian public figures whom she alleged were homosexual or bisexual. The posts were criticised by some LGBTQ activists in Cameroon; Shakiro subsequently apologised and deleted the posts.

In 2023, Shakiro obtained a refugee visa and moved to Brussels, Belgium.
