= John Williams Ntwali =

Rwandan journalist (1979–2023)

- Born: June 7, 1979; Butare, Southern Province, Rwanda
- Died: January 18, 2023 (aged 43); Kigali, Rwanda
- Occupation: Investigative journalist
- Years active: –2023
- Employer(s): The Chronicles (editor); Pax TV – IREME News (founder)
- Children: 1

John Williams Ntwali (7 June 1979 – 18 January 2023) was a Rwandan investigative journalist. The founder of the YouTube news channel PAX TV – IREME News and editor of the independent newspaper The Chronicles, he often reported on human rights stories, and was critical of the Rwandan government. Having spoken previously about being threatened due to his journalism, on 17 January 2023, Ntwali was officially identified as being the victim of a road accident that had occurred the previous day; numerous human rights organisations and press associations have disputed this account and called for an investigation into whether he was murdered.

== Personal life ==
Ntwali was born in 1979 in Butare, Southern Province, Rwanda, the second of six children. In 2005, he graduated from the Adventist University of Central Africa in Kigali. He was married with one child at the time of his death.

== Journalism career ==
Before establishing himself as an independent journalist, Ntwali worked for several Rwandan media outlets, including City Radio, Radio Flash FM and IGIHE. In 2021, he became the editor-in-chief of The Chronicles. He previously founded an online magazine, IREME News, which he later turned into a YouTube channel under the name PAX TV – IREME News.

On both PAX TV – IREME News and The Chronicles, Ntwali regularly posted investigative stories that were often focused on human rights issues, government failures, and stories about the judiciary. Ntwali reported extensively on the residents of Kangondo, a slum in Nyarutarama, a suburb of Kigali, who were in a long-running dispute with the Council of the City of Kigali over land evictions and slum clearances. He also published pieces on the plights of human rights activists, including fellow YouTuber Aimable Karasira and Iryamugwiza Yvonne, and published details of their accounts of being tortured and of the poor living conditions in Rwandan prisons.

Ntwali's last report was a video posted onto his YouTube channel about the suspicious disappearance of a Rwandan genocide survivor who had vanished after speaking publicly about being physically assaulted by police officers.

== Death ==
=== Threats ===
Ntwali had been arrested several times prior to his death as a result of his activism. Ntwali had previously investigated the death of Assinapol Rwigara, the father of presidential candidate Diana Rwigara, whose official cause of death had been as a result of a road accident. His investigation led to his website being blocked. In the lead-up to the 2017 presidential election, Ntwali was arrested on 29 January 2016 on charges of raping a minor. The charge was later changed to indecent assault, and on 9 February was dropped altogether due to a lack of evidence.

Ntwali had spoken publicly about threats he had received by the National Intelligence and Security Service, who had told him that something would happen to him following the Commonwealth Heads of Government Meeting in Kigali in June 2022, if he did not stop his investigative reporting. He was frequently called an "umunyamakuru w'umuhezanguni" ('rouge journalist') by supporters of Paul Kagame, the President of Rwanda, on social media.

=== Official account of death ===
Ntwali was last seen publicly on 13 January 2023, where he was reported to have been investigating the ongoing imprisonment of opposition figure Christopher Kayumba on charges of rape.

On 17 January 2023, the Rwanda National Police asked Ntwali's brother Emmanuel Masabo to identify a body at Kacyiru Hospital, that had been received the previous day following a road traffic accident, stating the body had had no identification cards on it. Masabo confirmed that the body was that of Ntwali.

The Rwanda National Police subsequently released a statement confirming that Ntwali had died in a road accident that had occurred at 2:50 am on 18 January in Kimihurura, Kigali. Ntwali had been the passenger on a motorcycle taxi that had been hit by a speeding driver. Ntwali was the sole fatality of the crash. The police confirmed that the vehicle's driver had been immediately arrested and was in their custody.

On 31 January, the driver, Moise Emmanuel Bagirishya, pled guilty to vehicular manslaughter, and issued an apology for speeding and for driving while fatigued. He was fined one million Rwandan francs.

=== Response by human rights organisations ===
Following Ntwali's death, Human Rights Watch released a statement calling him "a lifeline for many victims of human rights violations and often the only journalist who dared reports on issues of political persecution and repression". They cast doubt over the official account that Ntwali had been killed in a road accident, and called on a prompt investigation to determine whether he had been murdered. Subsequently, a group of 90 civil society organisations and press associations, including Amnesty International and the Committee to Protect Journalists, released a joint statement calling on the Rwandan government to allow an independent, impartial and effective investigation into Ntwali's death.

In the United States, the Senate Committee on Foreign Relations released a statement stating that Ntwali had been "silenced" and called his death "suspicious" and called for an investigation.

Following Bagirishya's conviction for vehicular manslaughter, Human Rights Watch criticised the trial for occurring behind closed doors, and pointed out that the Rwanda National Police had still not released an official police report, the exact location of the crash, and the details of any witness accounts or other individuals involved with the crash.

=== Government response ===
Initially, the Rwandan government did not release an official statement in response to Ntwali's death. Victoire Ingabire Umuhoza of the opposition Development and Liberty for All party stated she was "shocked" by Ntwali's death, and called for an investigation into why it took almost 48 hours for the body of a noted journalist to be identified.

Yolande Makolo, a government spokesperson, subsequently released a statement accusing activists of making "groundless insinuations" about Ntwali's death, citing eight other Rwandans who had been killed in accidents involving motorcycle taxis in January 2023.

== See also ==
- Kizito Mihigo
- Martinez Zogo
- Thulani Maseko
