= Joseph Charles Doumba =

Cameroonian politician (1936–2017)

Secretary-General of the Cameroon People's Democratic Movement
- In office 10 March 1992 – 4 April 2007
- President: Paul Biya
- Deputy: Grégoire Owona
- Preceded by: Ebénézer Njoh-Mouellé
- Succeeded by: René Sadi

Minister in Charge of Special Duties at the Presidency
- In office 8 November 1979 – 16 May 1988
- Prime Minister: Paul Biya; Bello Bouba Maigari; Luc Ayang
- Preceded by: François Sengat Kuo; El Hadj Yaji Abdoulaye
- Succeeded by: Georges Walter Ngango

Minister of Justice
- In office 30 June 1975 – 8 November 1979
- Prime Minister: Paul Biya
- Preceded by: Simon Achidi Achu
- Succeeded by: Gilbert Andzé Tsoungui

Minister of Information and Culture
- In office 7 June 1974 – 30 June 1975
- Preceded by: Vroumsia Tchinaye
- Succeeded by: René Zé Nguélé

Personal details
- Born: 2 February 1936
- Died: 5 March 2017 (aged 81)
- Party: CPDM
- Other political affiliations: CNU (1966–1985)

Joseph Charles Doumba (2 February 1936 – 5 March 2017) was a Cameroonian politician. He was first appointed to the government of Cameroon as Minister of Information and Culture in 1974, and then Minister of Justice from 1975 to 1979. Doumba was Secretary-General of the Cameroon People's Democratic Movement (RDPC) from 1992 to 2007.

== RDPC Secretary-General ==
Doumba was designated as Secretary-General of the RDPC, the ruling party, on 10 March 1992. He was viewed as strongly loyal to President Paul Biya.

Doumba and RDPC Deputy Secretary-General Gregoire Owona had a poor relationship; by 2003 they had reportedly not been on speaking terms for years, and Biya was said to primarily work with Owona, while largely ignoring Doumba. Doumba's health was poor by that time, and he was often in France for medical treatment; he also faced discontent within the party due a perception that he was aloof from the party at the local level, and he was accused of ignoring the Central Committee. Rumors in May 2003 suggested that he had tried to resign but that Biya had refused to accept his resignation.

Doumba's poor health was highlighted by the visible difficulty he had in giving a speech at an RDPC extraordinary congress in July 2006. Due to the state of his health, party affairs were largely managed by Owona until Biya, in his capacity as National President of the RDPC, appointed Rene Sadi to succeed Doumba on 4 April 2007. On the same occasion, he appointed Doumba as Roving Ambassador at the Presidency.
