= Ebénézer Njoh-Mouellé =

Cameroonian philosopher and politician (born 1938)

Ebenezer Njoh-Mouellé
- Njoh-Mouellé in 2016

Minister of Communication
- In office 22 September 2006 – 7 September 2007
- Prime Minister: Ephraïm Inoni
- Preceded by: Pierre Moukoko Mbonjo

Member of the National Assembly for Nkam
- In office 1997–2002

Secretary-General of the Cameroon People's Democratic Movement
- In office 11 July 1990 – 10 March 1992
- President: Paul Biya
- Preceded by: Office established
- Succeeded by: Joseph Charles Doumba

Personal details
- Born: 17 September 1938 (age 88) Wouri-Bossoua, French Cameroon
- Party: CPDM
- Education: École normale supérieure University of Paris (PhD)

Ebenezer Njoh-Mouellé (born 17 September 1938) is a Cameroonian philosopher, academic and politician who served as Secretary-General of the Cameroon People's Democratic Movement from 1990 to 1992. He has also held several academic and administrative positions, including senior positions at the University of Yaoundé and the École normale supérieure of Yaoundé.

== Biography ==
Ebénézer Njoh-Mouellé was born on 17 September 1938 in Wouri-Bossoua, a locality in the canton of Bossoua in the Yabassi area of the Littoral Region of Cameroon.

He attended the Lycée Général-Leclerc in Yaoundé, where he obtained his baccalauréat in June 1959. He subsequently moved to France on a scholarship to pursue higher education. He attended the Lycée du Mans and the Lycée Henri-IV in Paris, where he prepared for the entrance examination to the École normale supérieure. In June 1964, he obtained a licence in philosophy and subsequently completed graduate studies in the subject. In June 1967, he received a doctorate in letters and human sciences from the University of Paris, having studied with the support of a scholarship from the United Nations Special Fund.

Njoh-Mouellé returned to Cameroon in October 1967 and joined the École normale supérieure in Yaoundé as a lecturer. From 1968 to 1972, he served as its Director of Studies. From 1972 to 1973, he was Director of Higher Education at the Ministry of National Education. He then served as Secretary-General of the University of Yaoundé from 25 August 1973 to 28 July 1981.

On 28 July 1981, he became Director of the École normale supérieure in Yaoundé, a position he held until 9 August 1984. He subsequently served as Director-General of the Centre universitaire de Douala from 9 August 1984 to 6 March 1987. Njoh-Mouellé was appointed a technical adviser at the Presidency of the Republic in November 1986.

In June 1990, Njoh-Mouellé became an alternate member of the Central Committee of the Cameroon People's Democratic Movement. On 11 July 1990, he was appointed Secretary-General of the Central Committee, becoming the first person to hold the newly established position. He remained in the post until 10 March 1992, when he was replaced by Joseph Charles Doumba.

Njoh-Mouellé contested the 1992 parliamentary election in the Nkam constituency, which had one seat. He was defeated. He was subsequently elected as a CPDM deputy for Nkam in the 1997 election and served in the National Assembly during the 1997–2002 legislative term.

On 22 September 2006, Njoh-Mouellé was appointed Minister of Communication. He remained in the position until the government reshuffle of 7 September 2007.

In 2017, he chaired the jury of the Grand Prix of Literary Associations, a literary award in Cameroon.

== Honors and awards ==
- Commander of the Order of Legion of Honour
- Officer of the Ordre des Palmes Académiques
