= Jean-Pierre Robins Ghoumo =

Cameroonian politician

Director General of External Research at the General Directorate of External Research
- In office 21 December 2023 – 20 February 2024
- Preceded by: Léopold Maxime Eko Eko
- Succeeded by: Unknown

Personal details
- Born: Nkong-Ni, Menoua, West Region, Cameroon
- Education: Institute for International Relations (Cameroon)|Institute for International Relations, Cameroon

Jean-Pierre Robins Ghoumo is a Cameroonian politician who served as the director general of external research of the General Directorate of External Research, the Cameroonian intelligence agency, from 20 December 2023 to 20 February 2024.

== Biography ==
Ghoumo was born in the Nkong-Ni subdivision of Menoua Department, West Region, Cameroon. He graduated from the Institute of International Relations of Cameroon specializing in diplomacy between 2000 and 2003. Ghoumo served in various positions within the Cameroonian government, starting as a secretary to Cameroonian Secretary General Ferdinand Ngoh Ngoh and later as an advisor to the internal affairs division of the Cameroonian general secretariat.

By 2023, Ghoumo was the Deputy Director General of External Research at the General Directorate of External Research, Cameroon's intelligence agency. His boss, Leopold Maxime Eko Eko, was implicated in the assassination of Martinez Zogo, a radio broadcaster. Eko Eko was sacked from his position and replaced by Ghoumo on 21 December 2023, although Cameroonian officials prevented Ghoumo from accessing documents and materials that Eko Eko had access to. Cameroonian authorities believed that Ghoumo was loyal to Eko Eko instead of Ngoh Ngoh, who is widely considered to be running Cameroonian affairs.

Ghoumo was fired as director general on 20 February 2023, a month after his appointment, due to perceived loyalties to Eko Eko and falling short of his expectations in carrying out investigations. Four days before his dismissal, Ghoumo fired James Elong Lobe for corruption, and Lobe was loyal to Ngoh Ngoh.
