= Yondo Black =

Cameroonian lawyer (1938–2025)

- Born: Yondo Mandengue Black; 10 August 1938
- Died: 16 October 2025 (aged 87); Douala, Cameroon
- Occupation: Lawyer

Yondo Mandengue Black (10 August 1938 – 16 October 2025) was a Cameroonian lawyer. He was notably bâtonnier of the Cameroon Bar Association from 1982 to 1986.

== Life and career ==
Born on 10 August 1938, Black moved to France in 1961 and became active in student organizations, such as the National Union of Kamerun Students in France. He was expelled from the country alongside Woungly-Massaga following unrest in the country linked to the death of Patrice Lumumba and the Black African Students Federation in France.

Upon his return to Cameroon, Black rose to prominence as a lawyer following a stint in prison. As batonnier of the Cameroon Bar Association, he founded the Conférence internationale des barreaux. He often ended his speeches with the expression "J'ai dit" ("I said"). In the 1990s, he became an activist for political change in Cameroon, working alongside Anicet Ekane and Djeukam Tchameni. After serving a prison term for fighting for press freedom, he spoke at a conference at the residence of Albert Dzongang amidst the 2018 presidential election calling for Paul Biya to step down. On 5 June 2020, he spoke out against a private succession of power for the Cameroonian presidency. On 6 July 2024, he was named first honorary lawyer of Cameroon.

Black died in Douala on 16 October 2025, at the age of 87.

== Works ==
- Une justice qui vous broie. . . Affaire Me Lydienne Yen Eyoum: Une justice sous influence (2017)
- Et maintenant... Maurice Kamto (2020)
- Au fil de ma plume, Mes écrits et mes interventions politiques (2023)
