= Njomgang Isaac =

Cameroonian politician (born 1931)

Isaac Njomgang

General Inspector of Territorial Affairs

Director of Territorial Affairs

Prefect of Mbam Department
- In office 1973–1976

Prefect of Mefou Department
- In office 1971–1973

Prefect of Boumba and Ngoko Department
- In office 1966–1971

Prefect of Haut-Nkam Department
- In office 1964–1966

Prefect of Bamboutos Department
- In office 1961–1964

Personal details
- Born: 1931 Tsep, Batoufam, West Region, Cameroon
- Citizenship: Cameroonian
- Occupation: Politician, administrator

Njomgang Isaac (born 1931) was a Cameroonian politician and administrator. He was the First black local Cameroonian Administrator appointed in Dschang Post Colonial Administration. He was born in 1931 at Tsep, Batoufam, West Region, Cameroon.

In 1954, the Arrondissement of Dschang in West Region was administered by a mixed group of white colonial Europeans (Messieurs Mouterde Emmanuel and Gauger Robert until 1959). They were replaced by Isaac, who was then the first local Cameroonian administrator of Dschang.

== Education ==
Isaac received his education at the local school of Batoufam and the high school in Dschang. He received his undergraduate education in Nkongsamba's College. Isaac was then selected to study public law and public administration at the Cours De Selection of Public Administrators in Dschang. Men entering the public administrators' education at this time were generally selected carefully by the colonial administrators themselves; they required high ability, strong leadership and a sense of dedication.

== Government service ==
From 1958 to 1976, Isaac was a prefect (in French, préfet, meaning the head of the capital of a department). There are 58 departments in Cameroon. As in the French model, the capital of a department is called the préfecture. A department is under the authority of a prefect, appointed by presidential decree, meaning that the prefect upholds both the authority of the state and implicitly the authority of the region at the local level.

Isaac was appointed by the Cameroonian President Ahmadou Ahidjo:

- Prefect of the Department of Bamboutos - 1961–1964
- Prefect of Haut Nkam Department - 1964–1966
- Prefect Boumba and Ngoko Department - 1966–1971
- Prefect of Mefou Department - 1971–1973
- Prefect of Mbam Department - 1973–1976

In 1974, he was appointed Director of Territorial Affairs at the Ministry of Territorial Administration in the Ahidjo's government.

In December 1977, Isaac was appointed General Inspector of Territorial Affairs at the Ministry of Territorial Administration in Ahidjo's government with the same ranking of a minister.

== Personal life ==
Isaac was married with nine children.
