= KIM University =

University in Kigali, Rwanda

- Former name: Kigali Institute of Management
- Type: Private
- Established: 2006 Kigali Institute of Management; 2015 KIM University
- Chairman: Mr. Peter Rutaremara
- Vice-Chancellor: Prof. Danson Musyoki
- Location: Kigali, Rwanda
- Website: http://www.kimuniversity.ac.rw

KIM University re-branded (December 2015) from Kigali Institute of Management (KIM) formerly International College of Accountancy and Management (ICAM) is a private institution of Higher Learning offering post-secondary education and training in Business Management and related disciplines in Rwanda. The Institution was registered in 2003 as a non-profit making organization under the law No. 20/2000 of 26/7/2000.

== History ==
The KIM University, formerly located 12 km from the center of Kigali City at Nyandungu on Kigali-Kayonza road, is no longer operational following the COVID-19 outbreak in Rwanda. The location where it once operated is now owned by the University of Medical Science and Technology (UMST). As of 2024, UMST hosts a total of 700 students from Sudan. Previously, KIM University offered a four-year Bachelor of Business Management (BBM) program with specializations in Accounting, Finance & Banking, and Procurement & Logistics Management. It also planned to expand its BBM options to include Economics, Human Resource Management, and Entrepreneurship, with over 1,000 students enrolled before its closure.

=== Undergraduate programs ===
- Bachelor of Business Management(BBM) with specialization in:

     -Accounting
     -Finance and Banking
     -Procurement and Logistics Management

- Bachelor of Science in Computer Science with Specialization in:

     -Information Technology
     -Information System
     -Computer Science

- Bachelor of Science in Economics with Specialization in:

     -Health Economic
     -Labour & Demography
     -Financial Economics
     -Agricultural Economics
     -Environmental Economics

- Bachelor of Science in Logistics and Supply Chain Management

=== Post graduate programs ===
- Masters in Business Administration - Accounting & Finance
- Masters in Business Administration - Marketing Management
- Masters in Business Administration - Logistics & Supply Chain
- Masters in Business Administration - Human Resource Management
- Masters in Business Administration - Project Management
- Masters in Business Administration - Strategic Management

=== Professional Courses ===
- Certified Accounting Technician (CAT) ICPAR
- Accounting Technicians Diploma (ATD) KASNEB
- Certified Public Accountant (CPA) ICPAR
- Certified Public Accountant (CPA) KASNEB
- Chartered Institute of Procurement & Supply (CIPS-UK)
- Certified Procurement and Supply Professional of Kenya (CPSPK)
- Diploma in Credit Management (DCM) KASNEB
- Diploma In Information Communication Technology- (DICT) KASNEB
- Certified Information Communication Technologist (CICT) KASNEB
- Certified Investment and Financial Analysts (CIFA) KASNEB
- Certified Credit Professionals (CCP) KASNEB
- Investment and Securities Technicians (IST) KASNEB CISCO
- Diploma and Certificates in Insurance – Kenyan College of Insurance
