= René Sadi =

Cameroonian politician (born 1948)

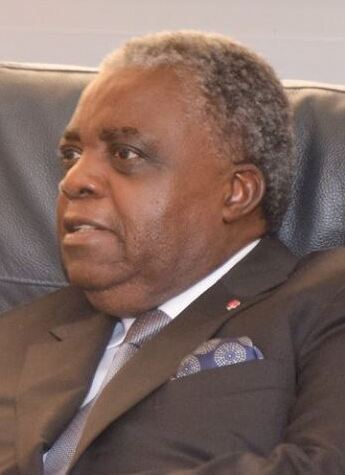
- Sadi in 2019

Minister of Communication
- Incumbent
- Assumed office 4 January 2019
- Prime Minister: Joseph Ngute
- Preceded by: Issa Tchiroma

Minister in Charge of Special Duties at the Presidency
- In office 2 March 2018 – 4 January 2019
- Prime Minister: Philémon Yang
- In office 30 June 2009 – 9 December 2011
- Prime Minister: Philémon Yang

Minister of Territorial Administration and Decentralization
- In office 9 December 2011 – 2 March 2018
- Prime Minister: Philémon Yang
- Preceded by: Marafa Hamidou Yaya
- Succeeded by: Paul Atanga Nji

Secretary-General of the Cameroon People's Democratic Movement
- In office 4 April 2007 – 9 December 2011
- President: Paul Biya
- Preceded by: Joseph Charles Doumba
- Succeeded by: Jean Nkuete

Personal details
- Born: 21 December 1948 (age 77) Maroua, Far North Region of Cameroon
- Party: Cameroon People's Democratic Movement
- Education: University of Yaoundé; International Relations Institute of Cameroon

René Emmanuel Sadi (born 21 December 1948) is a Cameroonian politician who has served in the government of Cameroon as Minister of Territorial Administration since 2011. Under President Paul Biya, he was Second Assistant Secretary-General of the Presidency from 2004 to 2009 and Minister for Special Duties from 2009 to 2011. Sadi also served as Secretary-General of the Central Committee of the Cameroon People's Democratic Movement (RDPC), the ruling political party in Cameroon, from 2007 to 2011.

== Administrative and political career ==
Sadi was born in Maroua, located in the Far North Region of Cameroon. Unlike most people in Cameroon's predominantly Muslim north, Sadi is a Christian. He began working at the Ministry of Foreign Affairs in 1975 and was subsequently appointed to a post at the Cameroonian Embassy to Egypt. Later, he was in charge of special duties at the Presidency of the Republic and headed the diplomatic affairs division at the Presidency.

Sadi was Technical Adviser to the Cabinet of the President from 1983 to 1985. After working for three months as Director of Studies and Information at the Ministry of Foreign Affairs, he was appointed as Deputy Director of the Civil Cabinet of the Presidency. He was then appointed again as Technical Adviser to the Presidency; subsequently he was Technical Adviser at the head of the Secretariat-General of the Presidency's diplomatic affairs division from 1995 to 2004.

President Paul Biya appointed Sadi as Second Assistant Secretary-General of the Presidency on 8 December 2004; Sadi was installed in that position on 21 December. In his capacity as National President of the CPDM, Biya appointed Sadi as Secretary-General of the Central Committee of the RDPC on 4 April 2007. Sadi succeeded Joseph Charles Doumba, whose health was reportedly poor, as secretary-general.

Speaking to The Post prior to the July 2007 parliamentary election, Sadi expressed satisfaction with his party's mobilization and explained that he was delivering Biya's message, which "dwells on hope and encouragement", on the campaign trail. He said that the RDPC's priorities included electoral reform, decentralization of decision-making to the local level, measures to promote good governance and fight corruption, the development of the economy and cooperation with the private sector, and improvements in education and public health. Following the election, in which the RDPC won an overwhelming majority of seats, Sadi denied the opposition's accusations of fraud; according to Sadi, the opposition displayed an undemocratic mindset by refusing to acknowledge legitimate defeat and blaming the RDPC instead of engaging in self-criticism. Sadi said that the RDPC won because it had delivered real results to the people and engaged in grassroots campaigning.

By 2008, there was speculation that Sadi, who held a key post at the Presidency and was also the RDPC's Secretary-General, could potentially succeed the aging Biya as President of the Republic, possibly at the time of the 2011 presidential election or the subsequent election. Sadi was regarded as a powerful figure; unlike the rest of the political elite, he was reputedly "strong enough to challenge presidential decisions, and even ... disobey such directives". According to one analysis, Sadi was Biya's most likely successor. It was surmised that the RDPC leadership would prefer a successor who was not associated with Biya's own native region in the south, and Sadi's status as a northerner of Christian faith could enable him to appeal broadly across both the largely Muslim north and the largely Christian south.

Biya moved Sadi to the post of Minister for Special Duties on 30 June 2009. Acting on Biya's behalf, Sadi went to ELECAM, the electoral commission, and submitted Biya's papers to stand as the RDPC candidate for the October 2011 presidential election on 4 September 2011. Following Biya's re-election, he appointed Sadi to the important position of Minister of Territorial Administration and Decentralization on 9 December 2011, while also removing him from his post as RDPC Secretary-General.
