= Siwi =

Siwi may refer to:

== Places ==
- Sibi, Pakistan
- Siwi, Burkina Faso

== People ==
- Siwi people
- Siwi Boora (born 1998), Indian boxer

== Other uses ==
- Siwi language
- Stockholm International Water Institute
