= Germain Cyrille Ngota Ngota =

- Born: 1972?
- Died: 22 April 2010; Kondengui Prison, Yaoundé, Cameroon
- Other name: Bibi Ngota
- Occupation: Editor
- Years active: 1995–2010
- Spouse: Georgette Ngo'o

Germain Cyrille Ngota Ngota (also known as Bibi Ngota; died 22 April 2010), a Cameroonian, worked as an editor for the Cameroun Express in Yaoundé, Cameroon. He was the first journalist to die in the line of duty in Cameroon since 1992.

The Federation of African Journalists said Ngota had died from lack of medical attention while in prison for his reporting. In its report, the organisation said Cameroon's imprisonment and use of torture or intimidation in the cases of 13 journalists in the previous year made it one of the worst places for journalists and press freedom in Africa. Two other journalists were imprisoned with him and freed months after his death but the charges against them were not dropped.

== Death ==
Ngota and his colleagues were held at Kondengui Central Prison.

On 5 February 2010 Ngota was arrested along with three other journalists from different publications. The journalists were held for several days and questioned. They were released, then charged with falsifying a government document. Ngota and two other journalists were rearrested and held in Kondengui Central Prison, Yaoundé, Cameroon. On 22 April, Ngota died under suspicious circumstances.

The official report stated that Ngota had died due to complications arising from HIV. Ngota's widow denied this claim and his family requested an investigation be done that included the family and was separate from any possible government interference. In September 2010, the findings of a government agency's inquiry were presented. The family felt these findings were unreliable and "opaque".

== Context ==
Ngota was working on an assignment for the Cameroun Express with three other journalists. They had received a document which alleged corruption in a state-run oil company called Société Nationale des Hydrocarbures (SNH). The document purportedly implicated Laurent Esso, secretary-general of the presidency, in paying three SNH managers an unusually high commission.

Ngota and the other three journalists sent questions to Esso and were subsequently arrested and questioned about the memo that they had received. The journalists were released after several days. They were then charged with falsifying government documents, and Ngota and two other journalists were arrested once more. One of the journalists, Simon Hervé Nko'o, had already gone into hiding.

The other two journalists were eventually freed from prison, but not until Robert Mintya had been attacked and considerable pressure had been put on the government by Reporters Without Borders.

== Impact ==
Ngota was the first journalist to die in the line of duty in Cameroon since 1992, and as a result it drew more light to the state of affairs there for journalists.

The imprisonment of journalists and Ngota's death caused human rights groups to reassess press freedom in Cameroon. His death and the events surrounding it caused Cameroon to drop 20 places in the 2010 press freedom index released by Reporters Without Borders. His death further drew more attention to the incarceration of Serge Sabouang and Robert Mintya, eventually leading to their release.

A year and a half after Ngota's death, Reporters Without Borders did an inspection of press freedoms in Cameroon before the country's 9 April elections. According to its observations, the incumbents had a perceivable advantage over the opposition in terms of visibility and media coverage. The government announced that it would hold a conference on media but Reporters Without Borders noted that none of the laws, like the ones that led to Ngota's arrest and death had been changed. According to the press freedom organisation, journalism was not recognised as a profession that needed special protections and violations in Cameroon were treated as if they were criminal offences with bureaucrats holding significant power over the legal process in such cases. The organisation also noted that Cameroon's press laws were outdated and did not take account of new technologies like the Internet.

== Reactions ==
Irina Bokova, The Director-General of UNESCO, said "The detention and death of journalists represents a loss for any society; the loss of a pair of eyes and of a voice that can inform the public about issues that concern us all. I trust that the authorities will do all they can to shed light on this tragic death..."

The Committee to Protect Journalists along with Reporters Without Borders and other groups pushed the government of Cameroon to investigate Ngota's death further.

== Career ==
Ngota worked at the Cameroun Express as an editor, and he had over 15 years of experience as a journalist. Ngota was investigating corruption in the government of Cameroon when he was imprisoned for his reporting.

== Personal ==
Ngota was married to Georgette Ngo'o.
