= Jean-Claude Roger Mbede =

Cameroonian man imprisoned for homosexuality

- Born: 1979; Cameroon
- Died: 10 January 2014 (aged 34–35); Ngoumou, Cameroon
- Citizenship: Cameroonian
- Known for: Conviction under Cameroon anti-homosexuality laws
- Criminal charge(s): Homosexuality and attempted homosexuality
- Criminal penalty: Three years' imprisonment

Jean-Claude Roger Mbede (died 10 January 2014) was a Cameroonian man who was sentenced to three years' imprisonment on charges of homosexuality and attempted homosexuality. His sentence was protested by international human rights organizations including Human Rights Watch and Amnesty International, the latter of which named him a prisoner of conscience.

On 2 March 2011, agents of Cameroon's Secretary of State for Defense (SED) security service arrested Mbede after he sent SMS messages arranging to meet a male acquaintance. According to the UK newspaper The Guardian, the SED "regularly target and prosecute gay men" under penal code Section 347a: "Whoever has sexual relations with a person of the same sex shall be punished with imprisonment from six months to five years and with a fine ranging from 20,000 Francs CFA to 200,000 Francs CFA." Mbede was detained for one week on "suspicion of homosexuality" in Yaoundé before being formally charged with "homosexuality and attempted homosexuality" on 9 March.

Mbede was represented by Alice Nkom, a noted LGBT rights attorney and head of Cameroon's Association to Defend Homosexuals.

On 28 April 2011, he was found guilty on both charges and sentenced to three years' imprisonment in Kondengui Central Prison. His sentence was protested by Human Rights Watch, who described it as "a gross violation of Mbede's rights to freedom of expression and equality" and called on Cameroon's government to abolish the relevant law.

Amnesty International also issued an alert on Mbede's behalf, with a spokesperson stating: "Locking someone up for their real or perceived sexual orientation is a flagrant breach of basic rights and should not be allowed under any country's penal code". Amnesty International's Africa Director Erwin var der Borght stated, "Jean-Claude Mbede is a prisoner of conscience held solely because of his perceived sexual orientation. All charges against him should be dropped and he should be released immediately." Several local branches of Amnesty International are collecting signatures demanding his release.

In November 2011, Nkom stated that Mbede had suffered malnutrition and sexual assault while in prison. His appeal was scheduled for a hearing on 5 March 2012, but was delayed. He was provisionally released on 16 July 2012.

34 years old Mbede died on 10 January 2014 in his hometown Ngoumou after he left a hospital because he lacked money for continued medical care.
