= Anicet Ekane =

Cameroonian politician and activist (1951–2025)

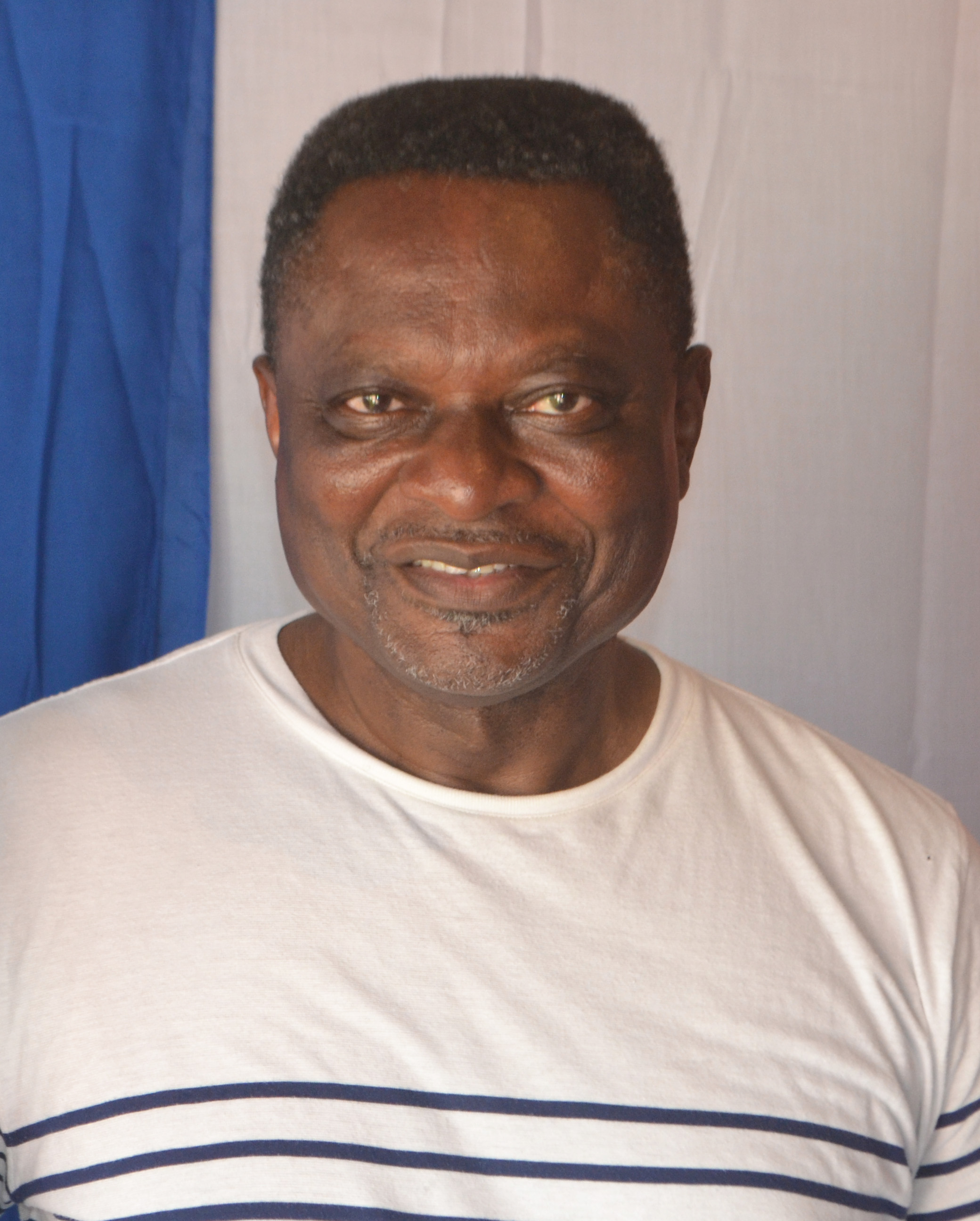
- Ekane c. 2017
- Born: Georges Anicet Ekane; 17 April 1951; Douala, French Cameroon
- Died: 1 December 2025 (aged 74); Yaounde, Cameroon
- Occupation: Politician
- Years active: 1990–2025
- Political party: MANIDEM

Anicet Ekane (17 April 1951 – 1 December 2025) was a Cameroonian politician, activist and intellectual who dedicated nearly five decades to the struggle for democracy and independence in Cameroon. He became a central figure in opposition politics, leading the African Movement for New Independence and Democracy (MANIDEM).

== Early life and education ==
Georges Anicet Ekane was born on 17 April 1951 at Laquintinie Hospital in Douala, Cameroon. His father, Ekan'a Mbongo n'a Ndongo, was a chief accountant at the Compagnie Soudanaise and built estates in Douala, Bomono, and near the Mungo River. His father had twenty-two children including Ekane. He attended the École Principale d'Akwa (later École Publique d'Akwa), where he completed his Certificat d'Études Primaires et Élémentaires (CEPE). He studied at Collège Liberman, then Lycée Joss (where he obtained his probatoire). He later attended Collège Alfred Saker and Collège Saint Pierre de Lille (France), earning his Baccalauréat D.

== Political career ==
The "Affaire Yondo Black et autres" of 1990, where Yondo Black and Anicet Ekane were arrested and tried for attempting to create a political party outside the one-party system, was his primary highlight into the opposition movement in Cameroon. Ekane became the leader of MANIDEM, a party advocating for African independence, democracy, and social justice. He played a pivotal role in supporting opposition leader Maurice Kamto, allowing him to represent MANIDEM in the October elections. This move made Ekane a target of government repression.

=== Arrest and death ===
Ekane's life has been cited as emblematic of resistance to authoritarian rule in Cameroon. He is regarded by some observers as a defender of democratic governance and national independence, despite facing significant personal consequences. He was arrested, designated a "terrorist" by authorities, and held under severe prison conditions. Ekane was arrested on 24 October 2025, in Douala, the day after the publication of presidential election results that returned the 92-year-old Biya to power. He was subsequently detained at the Secretary of State for Defence (SED) in Yaoundé. He faced accusations of insurrection and rebellion for contesting the election results. Reports suggest he was denied adequate medical care and oxygen, contributing to his death on 1 December 2025, at the age of 74.

== See also ==
- 2025 presidential election
- Cameroonian politics
