= Cameroun Express =

Cameroonian online newspaper

Cameroon express
- Type: Daily online
- Editor: Germain Cyrille Ngota Ngota
- Language: French
- Country: Cameroon

The Cameroun Express is a Cameroonian online newspaper created in July 2009.

A few months after its creation, the editor, Germain Cyrille Ngota Ngota died in prison.
