= Ministry of Labor and Social Security (Cameroon) =

Government ministry of Cameroon responsible for labour and social security

Ministry of Labour and Social Security
- Ministère du Travail et de la Sécurité sociale

Agency overview
- Jurisdiction: Government of Cameroon
- Headquarters: Yaoundé
- Minister responsible: Grégoire Owona, Minister of Labour and Social Security
- Website: www.mintss.cm

The Ministry of Labour and Social Security (Ministère du Travail et de la Sécurité sociale), known by its French acronym MINTSS, is the government department of Cameroon responsible for labour policy, occupational health, and social protection. It is headquartered in Yaoundé and is currently headed by Minister Grégoire Owona.

== Roles and responsibilities ==
The ministry is tasked with implementing the government's policy on employment, labor relations, and social security. It oversees the application of the Cameroon Labour Code (Law No. 92/007 of 14 August 1992) and ensures compliance with international labor conventions ratified by the country.

MINTSS acts as the primary liaison between the government, trade unions, and employers' associations, and serves as the official government interlocutor with the International Labour Organization (ILO). The ministry also works on expanding social protection frameworks in line with international development standards.

The ministry supervises the National Social Insurance Fund (CNPS), which manages the country's mandatory social security schemes, including pensions, family benefits, and occupational risk insurance.
