= Premier ECDE Teachers College =

Rwandan university

Premier ECDE teachers college
- Type: Private
- Established: 2013
- Founder: Patriciah Toroitich
- Faculty: 35
- Administrative staff: 15
- Students: 107
- Location: Kigali, Rwanda
- Website: www.premiercollege.ac.rw

Premier ECDE teachers college is an accredited Institution of high learning by the Government of Rwanda. It started in 2013 with 3 objectives:

- To provide education geared toward the development of the child's mental, physical and spiritual growth.
- To provide accessible, affordable and quality childhood education to teachers
- To promote the national goals and objectives of Early Childhood Development Education to Rwanda.

In 2017 the school was visited by the First Lady Jeannette Kagame.
