= Ngomedzap =

Coordinates: 3°15′N 11°12′E

- Commune and town
- Interactive map of Ngomedzap
- Country: Cameroon
- Time zone: UTC+1 (WAT)

Ngomedzap is a town and commune in Cameroon.

== See also ==
- Communes of Cameroon
