= African Movement for New Independence and Democracy =

Political party in Cameroon

African Movement for New Independence and Democracy Mouvement africain pour la nouvelle indépendance et la démocratie
- President: Valentin Dongmo
- Founder: Anicet Ekane
- Founded: 3 March 1995; 31 years ago
- Headquarters: Yaoundé, Cameroon
- Ideology: Left-wing nationalism
- Colors: Red
- Slogan: Cameroon is our homeland, Africa is our future. (French: Le Kamerun est notre Patrie, l'Afrique notre Avenir)
- Senate: 0 / 100
- National Assembly: 0 / 180

The African Movement for New Independence and Democracy (French: Mouvement africain pour la nouvelle indépendance et la démocratie, MANIDEM) is a left-wing nationalist political party in Cameroon. It emerged from the Union of the Peoples of Cameroon (UPC) and was legally recognized in 1995. Valentin Dongmo has been the party's national president since July 2026, succeeding Anicet Ekane.

== History ==
MANIDEM originated as a faction of the Union of the Peoples of Cameroon and initially operated under the name UPC-MANIDEM. The party was legally recognized on 3 March 1995. Anicet Ekane was subsequently one of its principal leaders and served as its president for several periods.

In the 2025 presidential election, MANIDEM initially supported opposition leader Maurice Kamto as its candidate. His candidacy was rejected by Elections Cameroon after another candidate, Dieudonné Yebga, was also submitted under the MANIDEM label. The Constitutional Council upheld the rejection against Kamto in August 2025.

Following the invalidation of Maurice Kamto's candidacy, MANIDEM shifted its support to Issa Tchiroma, with party president Anicet Ekane explaining that the decision formed part of the party's strategy of alliance for the election.

On 1 December 2025, Ekane died while in detention in Yaoundé at the age of 74. He had been arrested in October during the political crisis that followed the presidential election.

Following Ekane's death, Valentin Dongmo was selected as national president by the party's leadership on 13 June 2026. The new leadership was formally presented in Douala on 30 July 2026, with Dongmo succeeding Ekane as president.

== Election results ==
=== Presidential elections ===
Election	Candidate	Votes	'%	Result
1992	Did not participate			
1997	Did not participate			
2004	Did not participate			
2011	Anicet Ekane	11,081	0.23%	Lost ✗
2018	Did not participate			
2025	Did not participate			

=== National Assembly elections ===
Election	Leader	Votes	%	Seats	+/–	Position	Status
1997	Anicet Ekane	Did not participate		0 / 180	—	—	Extra-parliamentary
2002	Anicet Ekane	Did not participate		0 / 180	—	—	Extra-parliamentary
2007	Anicet Ekane	508	0.02	0 / 180	New	24th	Extra-parliamentary
2013	Anicet Ekane	15,771	0.39	0 / 180	Steady	▲11th	Extra-parliamentary
2020	Anicet Ekane	Did not participate		0 / 180	—	—	Extra-parliamentary
