= Jean-Pierre Amougou Belinga =

Cameroonian businessman

- Born: 20 February 1965 (age 61); Nkoumadzap, Méfou-et-Akono, Centre Region
- Citizenship: Cameroon

Jean-Pierre Amougou Belinga (born 20 February 1965) is a Cameroonian businessman known as the chief executive of the newspaper L'Anecdote and the TV channels Vision 4 and Télésud. Belinga caused controversy in March 2006 when he was sentenced to four months in prison for defamation after naming Grégoire Owona, a government minister, in a list of 50 presumed homosexual Cameroonians published in L'Anecdote. In 2023, he was arrested and charged in relation to the murder of journalist Martinez Zogo Mbani.

== Career ==
Born to farming parents in Nkoumadzap, Méfou-et-Akono, Centre Region, as an adult Belinga moved to Yaoundé, where he was mentored by newspaper editor Georges-Gilbert Baongla. In 1995, Belinga became the main editor of L'Anecdote. In 2020, he bought the television station Télésud. Belinga is a vocal supporter of Paul Biya, who has been President of Cameroon since 1982.

== Criminal investigations ==
=== Owona defamation case ===
In January 2006, L'Anecdote published a list of 50 influential Cameroonians it alleged were homosexual, as part of a larger tabloid crusade against "deviant behaviour" in Cameroon, which at the time had made "homosexual acts" punishable by up to five years in prison. Belinga had justified the publication of the list, saying "we could not remain silent, we had to ring the alarm bell... we don't regret it and we have to do it again". In February 2006, following a two week trial, judge Alexandre Amougou Anaba said that Belinga had failed to produce any evidence to support the allegation that Owona was gay, something which Owona had consistently denied. Owona stated the allegations had damaged his reputation and exposed his family to ridicule. Belinga was sentenced to a four month custodial sentence, in addition to paying symbolic compensation to Owona of 1 CFA. Belinga was also ordered to pay 1 million CFA to the Cameroonian government and to arrange for the judgement to be published in 15 national and international media outlets, with him having to pay an additional 300, 000 CFA to Owona for every day the judgement was not published.

=== Assassination of Martinez Zogo ===
In February 2023, Belinga was named as suspect in the investigation of the torture and assassination of journalist Martinez Zogo, who had disappeared on 17 January 2023 and whose body had been found five days later. Belinga is suspected of being the mastermind of the crime. Despite L'Anecdote reporting that Belinga's arrest had been part of "routine procedure", on 4 March 2023, Belinga was charged with complicity in torture.

== Personal life ==
Belinga is polygamous and has at least three wives.
