= Ministry of Territorial Administration (Cameroon) =

Cameroonian ministry

The Ministry of Territorial Administration is one of the 35 Ministries existing in Cameroon. Preparation, implementation and assessment of Government policy on territorial administration, decentralization and civil protection is within the framework of the duties assigned to the MINAT.

It is the duty of the MINAT to organize the territorial administrative units, chiefdoms and external services, to organize national and local elections and referendums in accordance with the constitutional laws. By assuring the preparation and implementation of the laws and regulations and the maintenance of public order, the MINAT acts as a guarantor public liberties- associations and political organizations; religious organizations; non-profit movements, organizations and associations. Performing as a guarantor of the state powers, the MINAT oversees the activities of regional and local authorities. The MINAT is also in charge of preventing and managing the risks related to natural disasters.

== See also ==
Njomgang Isaac, former Director-General of the Mimistry
