= Alternatives-Cameroon =

Former Cameroonian LGBTQ+ organization

Alternatives-Cameroon (also spelled Alternatives-Cameroun or Alternatives Cameroon) was an LGBTQ+ rights organization based in Douala, Cameroon. The organization was founded in 2006 and forced to close in 2025 after a police raid the previous year.

== Activities ==
Alternatives-Cameroon fought against the discrimination of LGBTQ+ people. Homosexuality is criminalized in Cameroon and punishable by five years in prison and a fine of 200,000 CFA francs (about 400 USD). Most convictions lack evidence of same-sex sexual activity.

Since its founding in 2006, the Alternatives-Cameroon had been documenting arbitrary arrests of LGBTQ+ people. The organization did advocacy work as well. In November 2009, the organization submitted with 1,500 signatures in support of decriminalizimg homosexuality to Cameroon's National Assembly; however, the petition did not lead any discussion about decriminalization. The organization helped on multiple Universal Periodic Review over the years alongside other organization such as Cameroonian Foundation for AIDS (Camfaids) and The Advocates for Human Rights.

Each year, Alternatives-Cameroon worked with other organizations like Camfaids and Humanity First Cameroon on awareness efforts for getting through school as an LGBTQ+ student. Many students who LGBTQ+ drop out of school due to stigmatization and discrimination. They are sometimes even expelled due to their gender identity sexually orientation. Lack of educational attainment limits their job opportunities and contributes to poverty. The awareness efforts created by these organizations teach LGBTQ+ students in higher education to be discreet and separate their school life and private life in order to graduate.

Alternatives-Cameroon worked to combat human immunodeficiency virus (HIV) and sexually transmitted diseases with a focus on the LGBTQ+ population. The organization held awareness campaigns, distributed lubricant and condoms, provided HIV treatment, preventative care, and proctological care. The organization was providing HIV care for 1,800 people prior to its closure.

== Police raid and closure ==
On September 30, 2024, the Alternatives-Cameroon's staff was finishing up a meeting in their Douala office with another non-governmental organization. They were discussing Project CHILL, an HIV public health initiative they planned to implement together. Just past 5 pm, the Public Prosecutor and two police officers with Interpol badges arrived at the office. They gathered everyone present into an administrative room and confiscated their phones. The authories asked those present about Alternatives-Cameroon's activities, their role in the organization, and the organization's supposed targets. Their questions were centered arpund the organization's work with marginalized groups including LGBTQ+ people, sex workers, and drug users. The authorities also searched personal belongs and offices in the building.

Ultimately, 13 people were arrested and detained for alleged human trafficking, clandestine practice of medicine, and homosexuality. Those arrested from Alternatives-Cameroon's staff included Lucien Ewane, the organization's president; Hermine Ngo Ndaptie, the manager of the drop-in center; Denis Watonwa, a psychological counselor; and peer educators Fotie Zidane and Oumarou Ousmanou. Three people receiving support from Alternatives-Cameroon and five people from the collaborating non-governmental organization were arrested as well.

Nine of the thirteen people arrested were later released. Four people, all staff at Alternatives-Cameroon, were taken to New Bell Prison for charges related to homosexuality. They were each forced to undergo anal exams, an unreliable practice used to determine if someone had participated in homosexual sex. Three staff members later got a provisional release. The one who remained, Denis Watonwa, was accused of luring a young boy into a sexual relationship at the organization's office. In 2025, he was convicted for homosexuality and sentenced to five years in prison. The regional public health division ordered Alternatives-Cameroon to cease operations.
