= Cameroon Renaissance Movement =

Political party in Cameroon

Cameroon Renaissance Movement Mouvement pour la Renaissance du Cameroun
- President: Tiriane Balbine Noah
- Founded: August 2012
- Headquarters: Yaoundé
- Seats in the National Assembly: 0 / 180

Website
- Party website

The Cameroon Renaissance Movement (French: Mouvement pour la Renaissance du Cameroun, MRC) is a political party in Cameroon.

== History ==
The party was established in August 2012 by Maurice Kamto. It won a single seat in the 2013 parliamentary elections.

Six members the MRC were arrested for distributing face masks and hand sanitizers in the capital, Yaoundé in May 2020. The use of face masks was obligatory during the COVID-19 pandemic.

In December 2021, around thirty executives and activists from the MRC were sentenced to prison terms for insurrection and endangering state security. The party's first vice-president Alain Fogué and Kamto's spokesman Olivier Bibou Nissack received seven-year sentences.
