= Adventist University of Central Africa =

Private university in Kigali, Rwanda

- Type: Private
- Established: 1978
- Students: Approx. 4000
- Location: Kigali, Rwanda
- Campus: 2 campuses - 22 ha and 1.7 ha
- Website: http://www.auca.ac.rw/

The Adventist University of Central Africa (AUCA; in French: Universite Adventiste d'Afrique Central) is a Seventh-day Adventist institution of higher learning near two campuses in Kigali, Rwanda. It is a part of the Seventh-day Adventist education system, the world's second largest Christian school system.

AUCA is the largest Adventist University serving the French speaking parts of Africa. In 2015, it had about 4,000 students.

== History ==
Adventist University of Central Africa was established in 1978, but officially opened on 15 October 1984. The school closed in 1994 due to political unrest, but was reestablished in 1996 in Kigali.

== Mudende Campus ==
Initially the campus was located at Mudende, in Gisenyi prefecture (one component of the current Western Province). The university grew for 10 years until the start of the Rwandan genocide (April 94 – July 94). During the genocide there was a general breakdown in law and order, and the Mudende campus was looted by the local population, the military, militias, and even AUCA staff before they fled. After the killing stopped, the vacant campus became "a sort of no man's land" for several years and the Mudende campus was stripped of anything removable.

At the end of 1996, the campus became a shelter for the first influx of Zairian refugees from nearby Kibumba (DRC). Although a few months later the Zairian refugees returned home, a larger group of refugees took over the campus, further stripping it of salable items and destroying fixed assets like washrooms. Conflict during the period of 1997-99 saw additional looting.

The university started negotiations with the Rwandan government in 1999 to sell the government the Mudende campus but it was not until 2003 that an agreement was reached. Finally in February 2006 the former campus the Government of Rwanda, represented by its Ministry of Defense, took over the old campus as a base for the Rwanda Defense Forces.

== Gishushu, Kigali Campus ==
The university reopened in 1996 using modest buildings and with limited course offerings. The 1.7 ha campus was not deemed large enough for a proper university, so a search commenced for a larger site. However the strategic location of Gishushu resulted in the school building a Science Centre and Technology there. Ground breaking occurred on March 8, 2012 with the Prime Minister of Rwanda and the President of the General Conference of the Seventh-day Adventist Church in attendance. After a two and a half year effort, the science center was inaugurated on 11 February 2015 by the President of the General Conference of the Seventh-day Adventist Church. The new building contains 24 classrooms which can each hold 40 to 60 students, all with fully networked, digitally responsive whiteboards that facilitate presentations and the instant archiving of lecture notes.

== Masoro, Kigali Campus ==
With proceeds from the sale of Mudende and church appropriations, a 22 ha site was secured for a new campus within sight of Kigali's International Airport. Construction of the new campus began on 12 May 2005 with ground breaking for the central academic block. Construction on a 2000-seat multi-purpose conference hall began in February 2009 and was completed in September 2011. Paving and other buildings followed.

== Degree courses ==
As of 2015 AUCA offers both undergraduate and master's level programs in the following areas:

=== Undergraduate ===
- Faculty of Business Administration
- Faculty of Education
- Faculty of Theology
- Faculty of Information Technology
- School of Medicine

=== Master's ===
- Master of Education
- Master of Business Administration MBA
- Master of Science in Administration: International Development Program

== Publications ==
A research center within AUCA publishes the Journal of Inter-Discourse Academia (JIDA).

== Notable alumni ==
- John Williams Ntwali, Rwandan investigative journalist (2005)
- Jean de Dieu Rurangirwa, former Minister for Information Technology and Communications (MITEC) of the Republic of Rwanda.

== See also ==
- List of Seventh-day Adventist colleges and universities
- Seventh-day Adventist education
