= Alphonse Siyam Siwe =

Cameroonian politician

Alphonse Siyam Siwe (born August 4, 1953) is a Cameroonian politician who served as Minister of Energy and Water from 2004 to 2006 and was previously the Director-General of the Autonomous Port of Douala. In 2007, he was sentenced to 30 years in prison for corruption.

== Life and career ==
Born in Douala, Siwe was Deputy Director of Labogenie from 1981 to 1984 and Director of Labogenie from 1984 to 1990. He was appointed as Deputy Secretary-General of the Presidency on September 7, 1990, serving in that position until 1992. He subsequently became Secretary-General of the Ministry of Public Works in 1995 before being elected to the National Assembly from Haut-Nkam constituency in the 1997 parliamentary election. He became Director-General of the Autonomous Port of Douala in April 1998 and remained in that post until February 2005.

In the 2002 parliamentary election, Siwe was re-elected to the National Assembly from Haut-Nkam constituency, where his list, that of the ruling Cameroon People's Democratic Movement, received 49.58 percent of the vote and won two of the three available seats. Siwe also served as Mayor of Bafang.

Siwe was appointed as Minister of Energy and Water in the government named on December 8, 2004. He served in that post for a little over a year; on February 24, 2006, he was dismissed from the government and arrested for allegedly participating in the theft of about 38 billion CFA francs in public funds during his stint as Director-General of the Autonomous Port of Douala. This was widely believed to be a witch hunt and an attempt by those in power at preventing his rise in popularity; which they saw as a threat. He was tried along with 12 other defendants in December 2007. On December 13, 2007, verdicts in the trial were announced; Siwe received the most severe sentence, 30 years in prison. He was convicted on six charges and acquitted on ten. Three of the other 12 defendants were also found guilty, including Edouard Nathanaël Etondè Ekotto and François Marie Siéwé Nitcheu, who respectively received 15- and 25-year sentences.
