= Paul Atanga Nji =

Cameroonian politician (born 1960)

Minister of Territorial Administration
- Incumbent
- Assumed office 2 March 2018
- Prime Minister: Philémon Yang; Joseph Ngute
- Preceded by: René Sadi

Minister in Charge of Special Duties at the Presidency
- In office 30 June 2009 – 1 March 2018
- Prime Minister: Philémon Yang

Personal details
- Born: 1960 (age 65–66) Bamenda, Northwest Region, Cameroon
- Party: CPDM
- Spouse: Marguerite Fonkwen Atanga

Paul Atanga Nji (born 1960) is a Cameroonian politician who has served as the Minister of Territorial Administration since 2018. A member of the Cameroon People's Democratic Movement (CPDM), he is known for his close ties to the inner circle of President Paul Biya's administration.

== Early life and education ==
Paul Atanga Nji was born in 1960 in the Bamenda, Northwest Region of Cameroon.

== Career ==
=== Political career ===
Atanga Nji's political career began in earnest in the 1990s when he took on various roles within the Cameroon People's Democratic Movement. He gained prominence for his loyalty to President Paul Biya and was seen as a representative of the party's interests in the Anglophone regions of Cameroon.

In March 2, 2018, he was appointed as the Minister of Territorial Administration by Biya, succeeding René Sadi. following a cabinet reshuffle. He later visited several parts of the country, including the Northwest and Southwest regions.

On October 2024, Atanga Nji banned media outlets in the country from discussing the president's health.

Atanga Nji holds the rank of Collaborator of the Head of State.

== Controversies ==
Throughout his tenure, Atanga Nji has been a controversial figure in Cameroonian politics. Critics have accused him of being dismissive of the concerns of Anglophone communities and of failing to address the root causes of the Anglophone Crisis. His rhetoric against opposition groups and international organizations has also drawn criticism, particularly regarding his approach to foreign intervention and advocacy groups.

== Personal life ==
Atanga Nji is married to Marguerite Fonkwen Atanga, a banker.

Political offices
Preceded by René Sadi	Minister of Territorial Administration; 2018–present	Incumbent
New office	Minister in charge of Special Duties at the Presidency; 2009–2018	Succeeded by Hamadou Moustapha
