= Kondengui Central Prison =

Maximum security prison in Cameroon

Coordinates: 3°51′19″N 11°32′33″E

Kondengui Central Prison is a maximum security prison in Yaoundé, Cameroon. It has been the subject of numerous international criticisms for its overcrowding and poor conditions.

Police forces are seen deployed at the Kondengui Central Prison in Yaounde.

Kondengui Central Prison is located in Yaoundé Centre Region, Cameroon.

Kondengui was constructed in 1967 and was originally built to house 1,500 inmates. The facility has 16 toilets and 400 beds.

In 2002, prisoners were fed one meal a day and given 4.4 ounces of soap every six months. In 2003, the US Department of State issued a "scathing" report on Cameroonian prisons in which it noted that Kondengui was severely overcrowded, housing a population of 9,530 in space meant for 2,000. In 2011, Amnesty International described the prison conditions to be "harsh, with inmates suffering overcrowding, poor sanitation and inadequate food. Prison guards are poorly trained, ill-equipped and their numbers inadequate for a big prison population."

== Notable current and past prisoners ==
- Albert Womah Mukong, a bookstore owner and pro-independence activist who wrote Prisoner Without a Crime based on his six years in prison during the 1970s and later became the head of Human Rights Defence Group, was imprisoned in Kondengui Central Prison in 2001 for his position on the self-determination of English speakers.
- Garga Haman Adji, politician, later Minister of Civil Service.
- Issa Tchiroma Bakary, politician, later Minister of Communication.
- Mancho Bibixy Tse, A local radio journalist and history teacher that sparked the Coffin Revolution of 2016 denouncing the human rights violations of Cameroon's Anglophone Cameroonian population. He is currently a prisoner.
- Maurice Kamto, politician, presidential candidate and formerly Minister-Delegate to the Minister of Justice
- Jean-Claude Roger Mbede, imprisoned for homosexuality and named a prisoner of conscience by Amnesty International.
- Enoh Meyomesse, dissident poet and presidential candidate imprisoned on widely disputed theft charges. Amnesty International, which does not have a permanent office in Cameroon, had named Meyomesse a prisoner of conscience. On April 16, 2015, after 40 months and 15 days in custody since his arrest on November 22, 2011, Enoh Meyomesse was finally declared not guilty and sprung from Kondengui Central Prison.
- Germain Cyrille Ngota Ngota, journalist whose arrest and death while in detention were protested by Reporters Without Borders and the Committee to Protect Journalists.

== In popular culture ==
Makossa singer Lapiro de Mbanga referenced the prison in a popular 2007 anti-corruption song, with lyrics including "Send them to Kondengui Prison. Everybody to Kondengui. ministers, directors send them to Kondengui".
