= Maurice Kamto =

Cameroonian politician and jurist (born 1954)

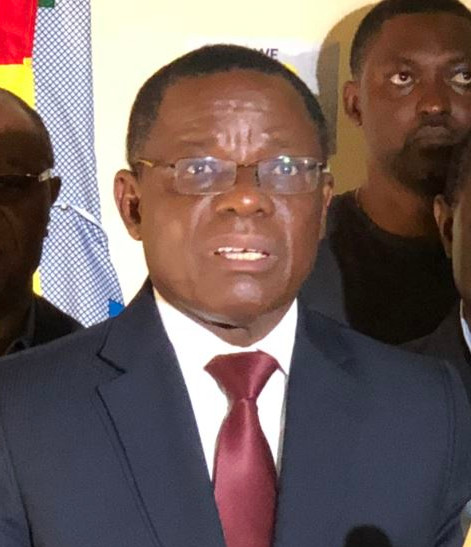
- Kamto in 2018

Leader of Cameroon Renaissance Movement (MRC)
- In office 22 June 2012 – 8 September 2026
- Preceded by: Position established
- Succeeded by: Tiriane Balbine Noah

Minister Delegate to the Minister of Justice
- In office 8 December 2004 – 30 November 2011
- Prime Minister: Ephraïm Inoni; Philémon Yang

Personal details
- Born: 15 February 1954 (age 72) Bafoussam, French Cameroon
- Party: MRC
- Spouse: Suzanne Julie Fantchom Wega
- Education: Université Nice-Sophia-Antipolis; University of Yaoundé
- Occupation: Politician; barrister; professor
- Website: Official website
- Nickname: Tagouborel

Maurice Kamto (born 15 February 1954) is a Cameroonian politician, law professor and barrister. He is one of the founders of the opposition Cameroon Renaissance Movement (MRC).

== Career ==
He was a member of the International Law Commission of the United Nations from 1999 to 2016. He was one of the two main agents, the other one being Professor Peter Ntamark in the Cameroonian delegation that successfully led the negotiations to resolve the matter of Bakassi, a peninsula disputed with neighboring Nigeria. His decisive contribution helped him to be appointed as Minister-Delegate to the Minister of Justice in 2004. He resigned from the government in November 2011.

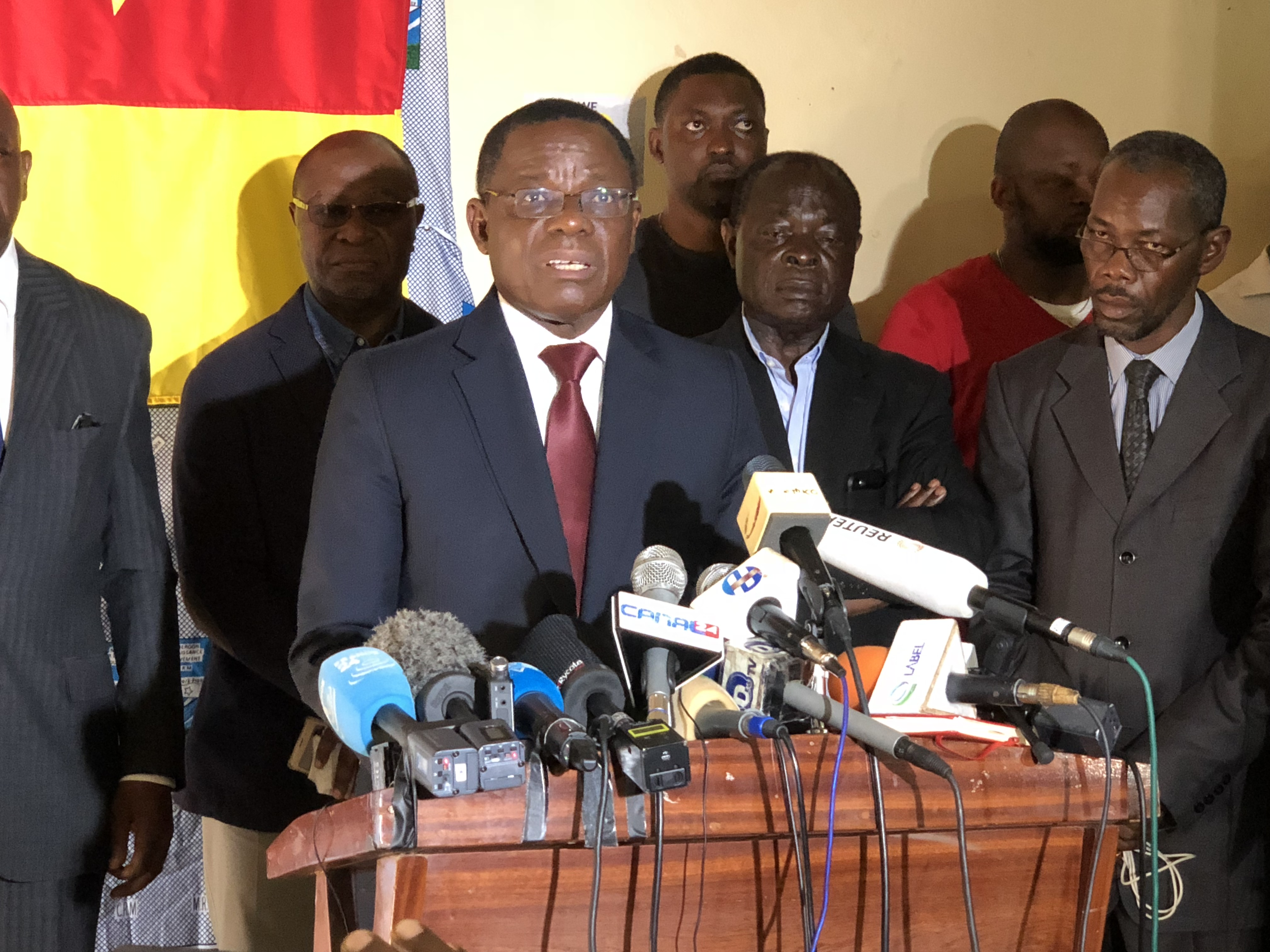
Kamto after the 2018 Cameroonian presidential election

After resigning from the government, Kamto formed a new opposition party, the Cameroon Renaissance Movement (MRC). A kick-off meeting of his party merging multiple parties was prohibited by the government on 13 August 2012.

In the 2018 Cameroonian presidential election Kamto ran as presidential candidate for the MRC. Incumbent President Paul Biya is said to have won, in spite of a fiercely contested result process. Indeed, the entire country watched a strong defence from Kamto’s group of lawyers who pointed the partiality of The Supreme Court of Cameroon that is composed of Biya’s CPDM party members. Kamto was declared runner-up by the Court and said to have received 14 percent of the votes. Kamto challenged the official results and declared himself winner of the election. His supporters held small-scale protests since then.

On 26 January 2019, Kamto and 200 of his supporters were arrested and locked up in Kondengui maximum security prison in Yaounde, Cameroon. He was freed on 5 October 2019 along with other leaders of his party, a day after the end of the Major National Dialogue, following an official release by President Biya.

In October 2021, Kamto declared "I am not sure that waiting after Biya will lead to a change in Cameroon".

On July 11, 2024, Kamto was summoned to be heard by the Cameroonian Gendarmerie Legion on an ongoing investigation.

Kamto filed his candidacy for president in the 2025 Cameroonian presidential election, but was disqualified on 26 July by the national electoral commission (ELECAM), which said that the MRC, having boycotted legislative and municipal elections in 2020, was ineligible to nominate a candidate. Kamto was excluded because he was one of two candidates registered to represent the MANIDEM party. Even though he had been officially adopted by the party's ruling body, another candidate from a splinter group also registered himself under the party's name.MANIDEM president Anicet Ekane described Kamto's exclusion as "arbitrary and provocative". Kamto appealed ELECAM's decision but the appeal was rejected by the Constitutional Council of Cameroon on August 5, 2025.

== Arrest and house arrest ==
In the months following the disputed 2018 elections, the MRC submitted, in vain, no fewer than a hundred requests for authorization to the Cameroonian authorities in order to carry out peaceful demonstrations. Those organized by supporters of the Biya regime and in its favour are authorized, to the great detriment of the equality of Cameroonian citizens vis-à-vis their constitution.

=== Arrest ===
On January 28, 2019, Maurice Kamto, whose party had finally called for non-violent marches known as "white marches" against the re-election of Paul Biya, was arrested by the Cameroonian authorities in Douala along with several executives, MRC sympathizers, journalists and members of his family at the home of Albert Dzongang. They were taken to the GSO (Special Operations Group) - an elite police unit - in Yaoundé. He was arrested for common law offenses. This came after the ransacking of Cameroonian embassies by his supporters. He was accused, among other things, of hostility towards the homeland and rebellion.

Subjected to violence by the police, Maurice Kamto and 145 other MRC supporters were accused of eight counts, including "incitement to insurrection", and transferred 14 days later to the central prison of Kondengui.

Emmanuel Macron, questioned by Calibri Calibro, an activist of the BAS of France, put pressure on the authorities of Yaoundé to obtain the release of Maurice Kamto. He adds that this was a condition for the arrival of Paul Biya in Lyon in France which occurred a few days after the release of Maurice Kamto and some co-detainees on October 5, 2019. Which was categorically refuted by the Yaoundé authorities. The release is accompanied by a suspension of legal proceedings against MRC activists and associates arrested in connection with the contestation of the results of the presidential election in Cameroon of October 2018.

=== House arrest ===
Following the march of September 22, 2020, Maurice Kamto's home was sealed off by law enforcement. In October 2020, the French Minister of Foreign Affairs, Jean-Yves Le Drian, raised this matter during a session of answers to questions from representatives of the people in France.

The blockade of his residence was lifted by the government on December 8, two days after the regional elections.

== Personal life ==
He is married to Suzanne Julie Fatchom Wega.
