= Minister of Foreign Affairs (Cameroon) =

The Minister of Foreign Affairs of Cameroon is a government minister in charge of the Ministry of Foreign Affairs of Cameroon, responsible for conducting foreign relations of the country.

The following is a list of foreign ministers of Cameroon since its founding in 1960:

No.	Name (Birth–Death)	Portrait	Tenure
—	Ahmadou Ahidjo (1924–1989) Acting Minister		1960
1	Charles Okala (1910–1973)		1960–1961
2	Jean-Faustin Betayéné (1922–1973)		1961–1963
3	Benoît Balla (1924–1977)		1963–1965
4	Simon Nko'o Etoungou (1932–2002)		1965–1966
5	Benoît Bindzi (1924–1998)		1966–1968
(4)	Simon Nko'o Etoungou (1932–2002)		1968–1970
6	Raymond N'Thepe (1914–1984)		1970–1971
7	Jean Keutcha (1923–2012)		1971–1972
8	Vincent Efon (1927–2003)		1972–1975
(7)	Jean Keutcha (1923–2012)		1975–1980
9	Paul Dontsop (1937–2019)		1980–1983
10	Félix Tonye Mbog (1934–2022)		1983–1984
11	William Eteki Mboumoua (1933–2016)		1984–1987
12	Philippe Mataga (1938–2003)		1987–1988
13	Jacques-Roger Booh-Booh (b. 1938)		1988–1992
14	Ferdinand Oyono (1929–2010)		1992–1997
15	Augustin Kontchou Kouomegni (b. 1945)		1997–2001
16	François Xavier Ngoubeyou (b. 1937)		2001–2004
17	Laurent Esso (b. 1942)		2004–2006
18	Jean-Marie Atangana Mebara (b. 1954)		2006–2007
19	Henri Eyebe Ayissi (b. 1955)		2007–2011
20	Pierre Moukoko Mbonjo (b. 1954)		2011–2015
21	Lejeune Mbella Mbella (b. 1949)		2015–present
