= Françoise Puene =

Cameroonian politician

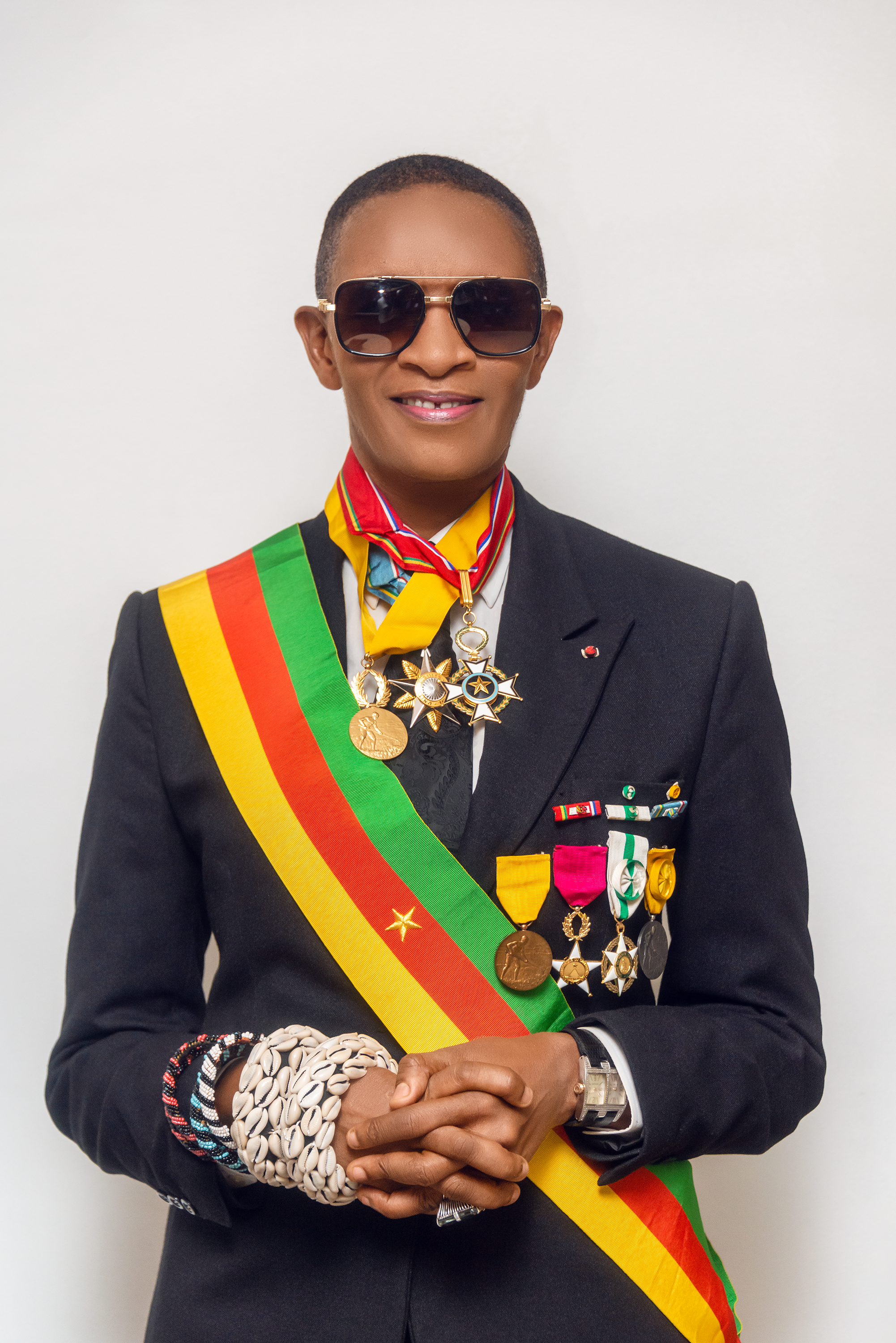
- Françoise Puene in 2024
- Born: February 28; Bafang
- Education: University of Nantes
- Political party: Cameroon People's Democratic Movement

Françoise Puene, also known by her pseudonym Mamy Nyanga, is a Cameroonian businesswoman and politician. She is the founding president of the Franco Hotels Group in Cameroon and the United Kingdom.

She has been a senator since 2023 and a member of the political party the Cameroon People's Democratic Movement (CPDM) since 1986.

== Biography ==
Françoise Puene was born in Bafang in the grassfields of Haut-Nkam in western Cameroon to a polygamous family, with her father having two wives. Françoise Puene grew up in a family of 15 children, eight of whom were from her biological mother. Her father, a catechist, was driver at the town hall and the owner of a drinking establishment. The children were raised them in the town of Bafang. Puene's mother was a member of the royal family of Fondjomekwet and a farmer. During the evenings, her father gathered his family for the tolly tolly, long sessions of storytelling traditional epics.

Françoise Puene holds a Master of Business Administration (MBA) from the University of Nantes in France.

=== Career ===
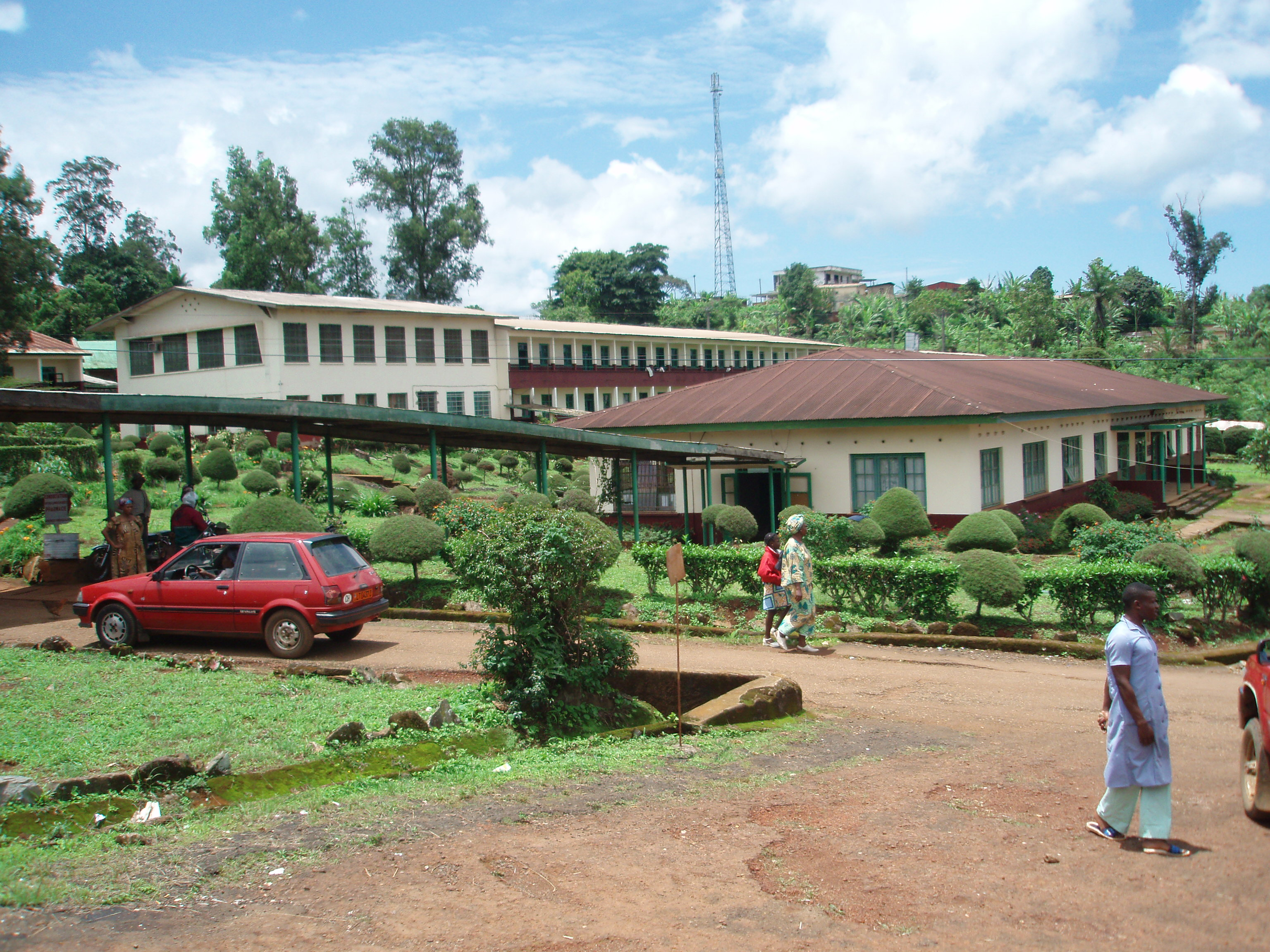
Ad Lucem Hospital in Bafang, where Françoise Puene worked as a nurse.

Françoise Puene began her career in the food industry, then in textiles, service provision and finally in real estate.

Françoise Puene passed the Bafoussam nursing competition in 1986. She was subsequently recruited at the Ad Lucem hospital in Banka.

Working part-time at the hospital, she accepted that a friend leave her some clothes bought in Cotonou. Françoise Puene stayed to sell these fabrics to her network of contacts there. She traded by selling doughnuts and beans and finally went to Cotonou to buy the clothes that she resold in Lagos (Nigeria) as well as in Limbé and elsewhere in Cameroon. She finally left Bafang and opened the largest bar in Bafoussam. She later moved to Yaoundé to participate in public markets. She was imprisoned and spent 13 months in the central prison of Douala, an experience that led her to create an association to help prisoners.

From Bayam-sellam, she became manager of several companies, including the Hotel Franco. She asked Joseph Kadji Defosso, also from Haut-Nkam and whose adopted daughter she considered herself to complete the work on one of her buildings under construction in Yaoundé.

== Politics ==
She affirms her support for President Paul Biya within the framework of the "Biyayists" movement, of which she is the national president. She is a member of the RDPC, like the late Françoise Foning, whom she considers a mentor.

== Personal life ==
Françoise Puene is the partner of professor and former minister Augustin Kontchou Kouomegni. She is the mother of two children from her marriage to the Banka chieftaincy.
