= Bana, Cameroon =

Bana
- Sub-Prefecture
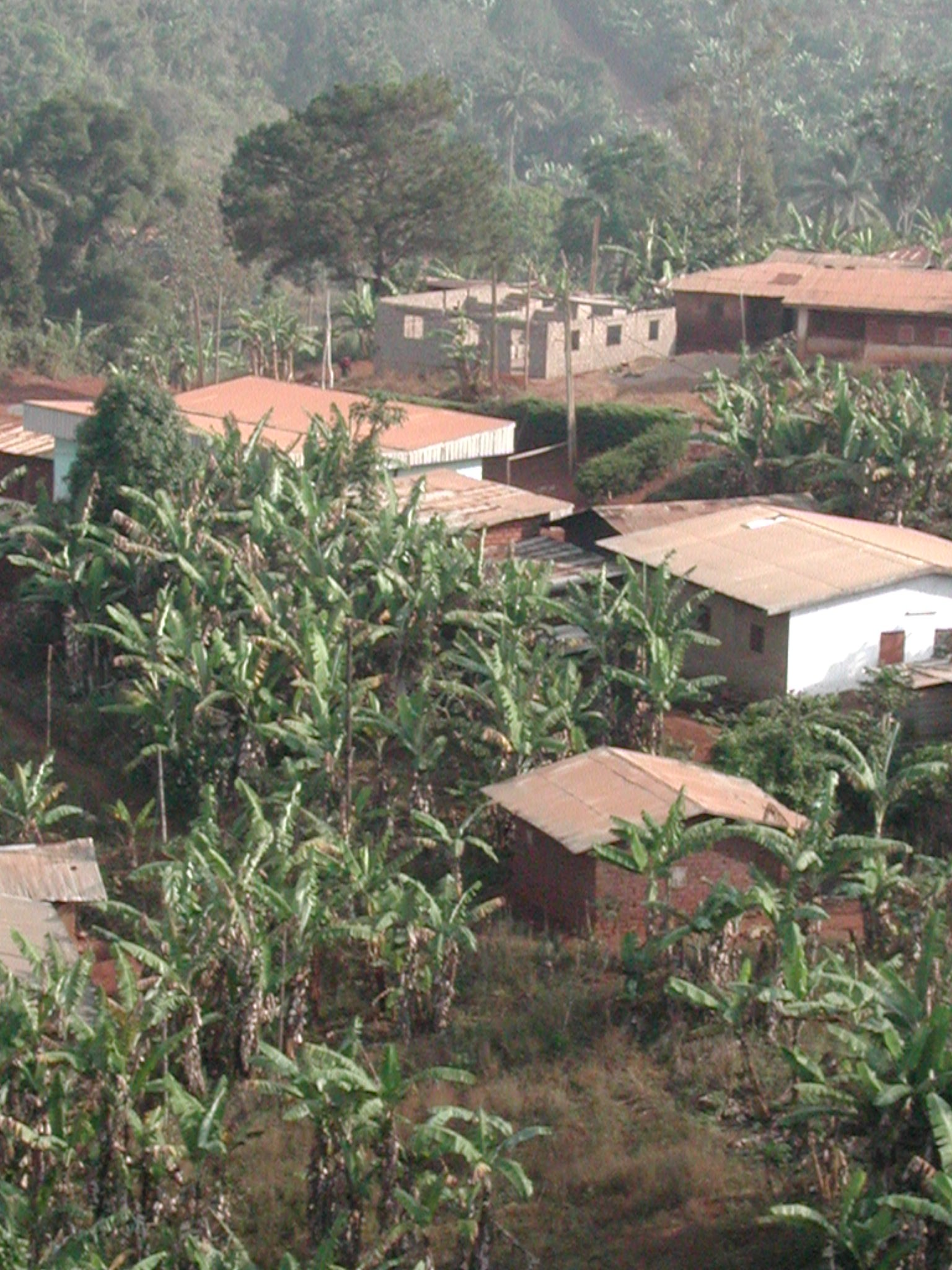
- Nickname: Petit Paris
- Location in Cameroon
- Coordinates: 5°09′N 10°16′E
- Country: Cameroon
- Province: West Province
- Department: Haut-Nkam
- Founded: 1379
- Created: 1963

Area
  - Total: 51 sq mi (131 km^{2})
- Elevation: 4,652 ft (1,418 m)

Population (2012)
  - Total: 5,727
- Time zone: UTC1 (Africa/Douala)

Bana is a sub-prefecture and commune in the West Province of Cameroon, some 8 km east of Bafang and 2 km south-west of Babouantou.

== Geography ==
Bana is accessed by road P15 which comes from Bamena in the east which passes through the heart of the commune and continues west to join the N5 road in the north-east of Bafang.

The word Bana means "birth place" (Ba = place, Na = born). The inhabitants are called Née however they often call themselves bana in French. Née signifies insistence, harassment, pursuit which may reflect the qualities of the founder of the town.

The language spoken in the commune is Fe'fe' which the locals simply call Bana.

The commune is located at a high altitude of 1,418 metres and consequently has a cool climate.

=== Geology ===
The land is of volcanic origin with basaltic bedrock (25%), granite (45%), and gneiss (18%). The soil is fertile. The wooded landscape is the result of a long interaction between the people and the land.

=== Hydrography ===
The rivers which cross the territory of the commune are:

- Schi madeu (near the chefferie)
- Schi Tie´ko
- Schi Luma
- Schi hua doh
- Schi Sabe between Bana and Batcha
- Maga´Schi
- Pa´schi (translated: "Red River")
- Schi gale
- Schi apa ntoo
- Schi ko Tcheu´

=== Districts ===
Map of Bana Districts

The commune four districts:

- Bana
- Badoumkassa
- Bakassa
- Batcha

==== Batcha ====
Batcha is a village located on one of the old Bafang-Bangangté roads in the east of Bana. Local people and some Mbororo (Fulani) nomadic herders live here attracted by the large pastures on the steep slopes of the mountain range that runs from Bana to Batcha and beyond.

The community features a large natural area sheltered by hills and mountains and especially by Mount Banatcha near Bana (according to sources) which rises to 2097 m.

Batcha in bamiléké means "land" or "visit".

==== Badoumkassa ====
Bandoumkassa is a village at an altitude of about 1700 metres. The average temperature here is 16 °C with an average temperature of 13 °C during rainy season. People live mainly from agriculture and small businesses. Most houses are made with bricks. Some elites have built very large and luxurious mansions. This district has been led for the past thirty years by His Majesty Victor Kamaha II who was a senior officer in the Cameroon police.

==== Bakassa ====
Bakassa is a village in the south of Bana. This is one of the largest villages by both population and area in the Bana arrondissement. This mountain village lies between other riverbank villages: Bana, Banfeko, Badoumkassa, Bassap, Bapoutcheu Ngaleu, etc. It can be reached by road via all these villages.

Agriculture is the main activity including food crops and coffee. This village has a particularly cool climate because of the altitude. This is one of the oldest chiefdom in the district headed, for many years, by His Majesty F. Ngako. He is the doyen of age and longevity of his reign for the arrondissement of Bana and the department of Haut-Nkam.

Traditional Bronze reliefs at the entrance to the Bakassa chefferie

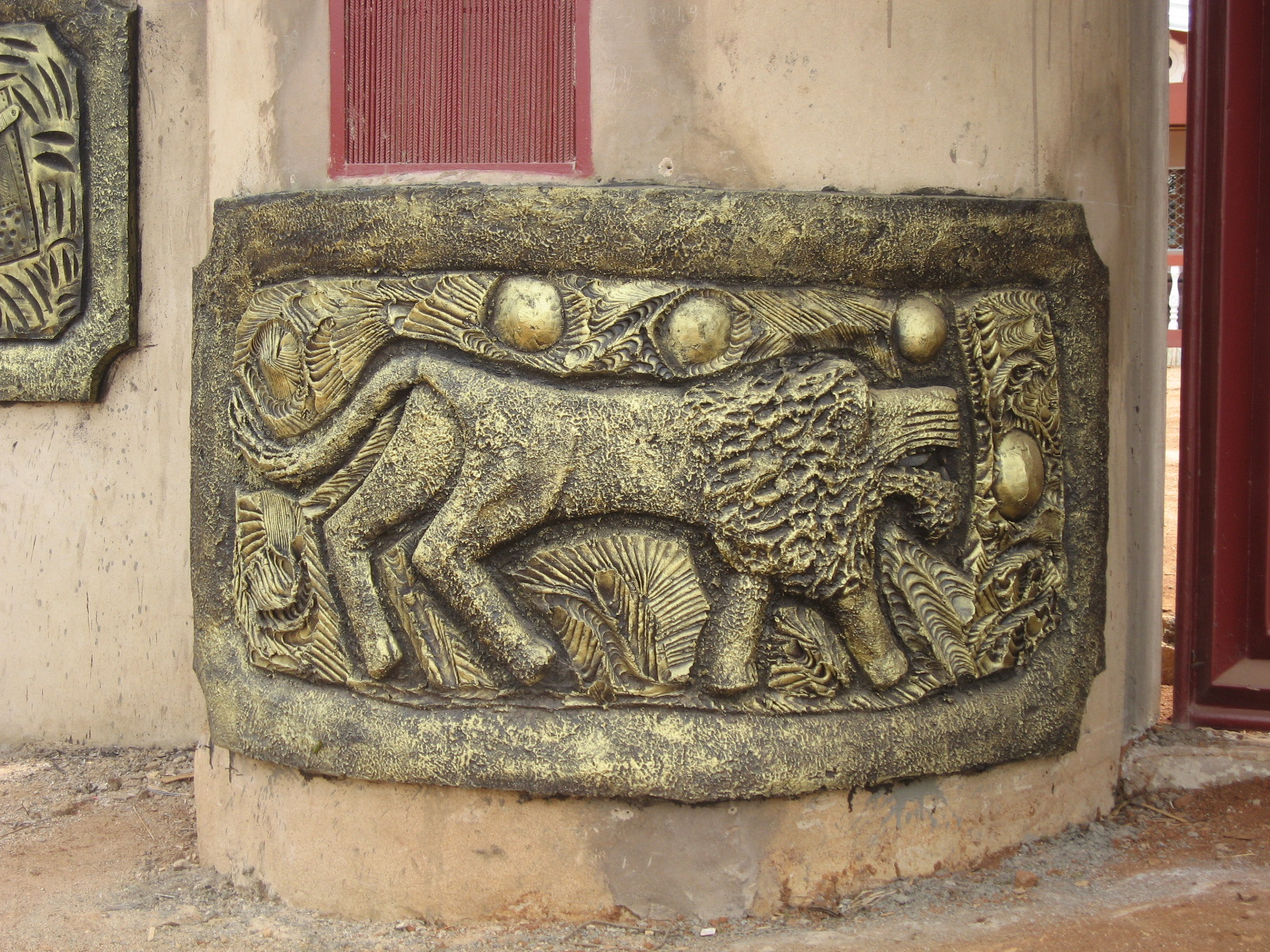

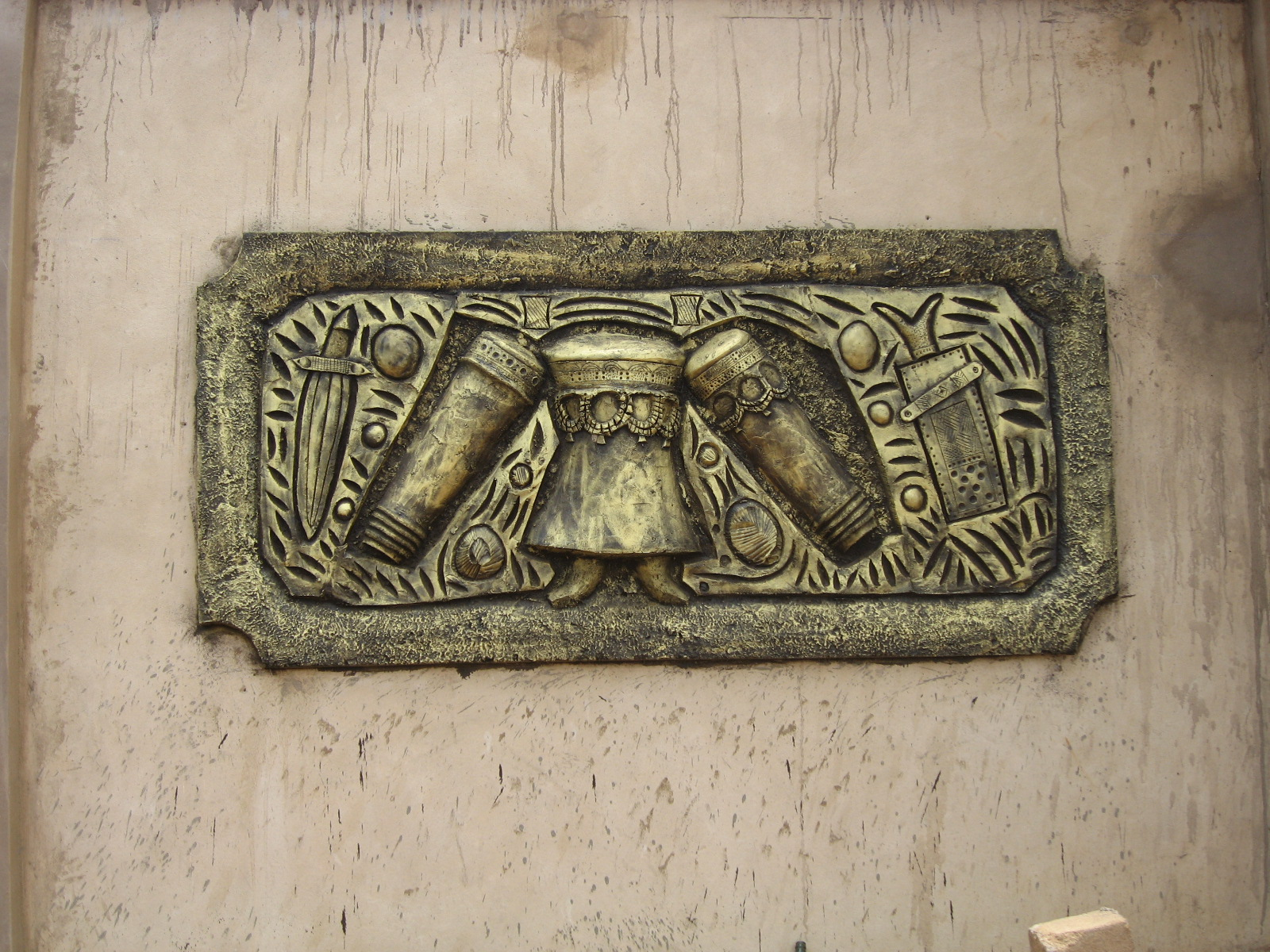

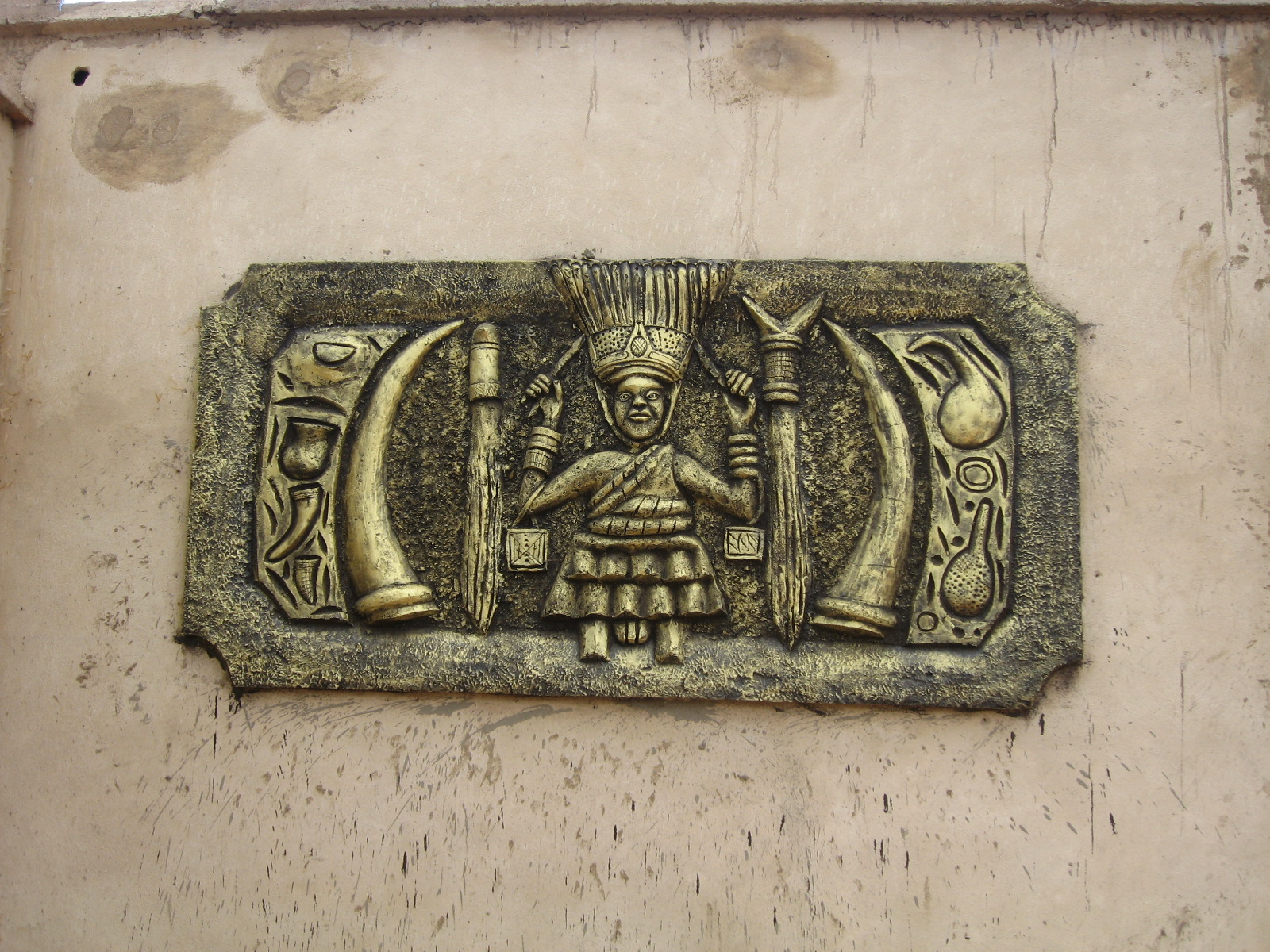

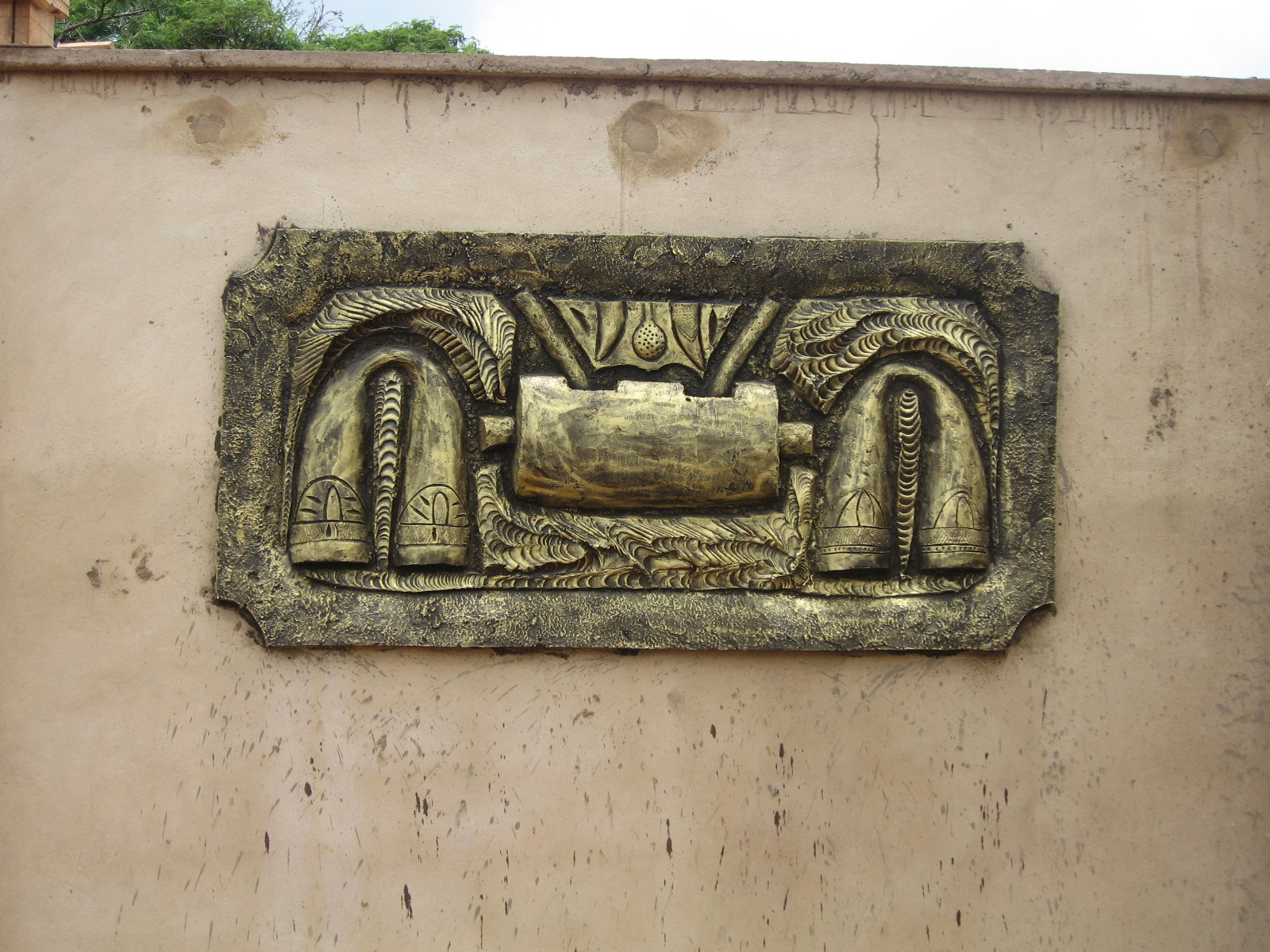

== History ==
Bana was once a customary kingdom founded in 1379 by Fon Tchokogwe(Nza), a first-degree chefferie (chiefdom) led by Fon Sikam Happi V. His successor in 2003 was Konchipe Happi IV.

The first chefferies in this part of bamiléké country were founded in the 17th century on the heights of the Ndumla plateau. The founders of these chefferies followed in the path of Neolithic people who also settled the area as evidenced by the results of the archaeological mission by F. Paris in 1974 with the discovery of stone tools on the same heights.

The chefferie is in the No. Ndum district: Ndum means "over" or "above" while Ndak means "Low", The lowlands are traditionally reserved for the elite.

From 1916 to 1920 Bana was the capital of the Western Division under French administration.

== Economy ==
The main economic activities are agricultural with the production of coffee and other vegetables.

== Bana Picture Gallery ==
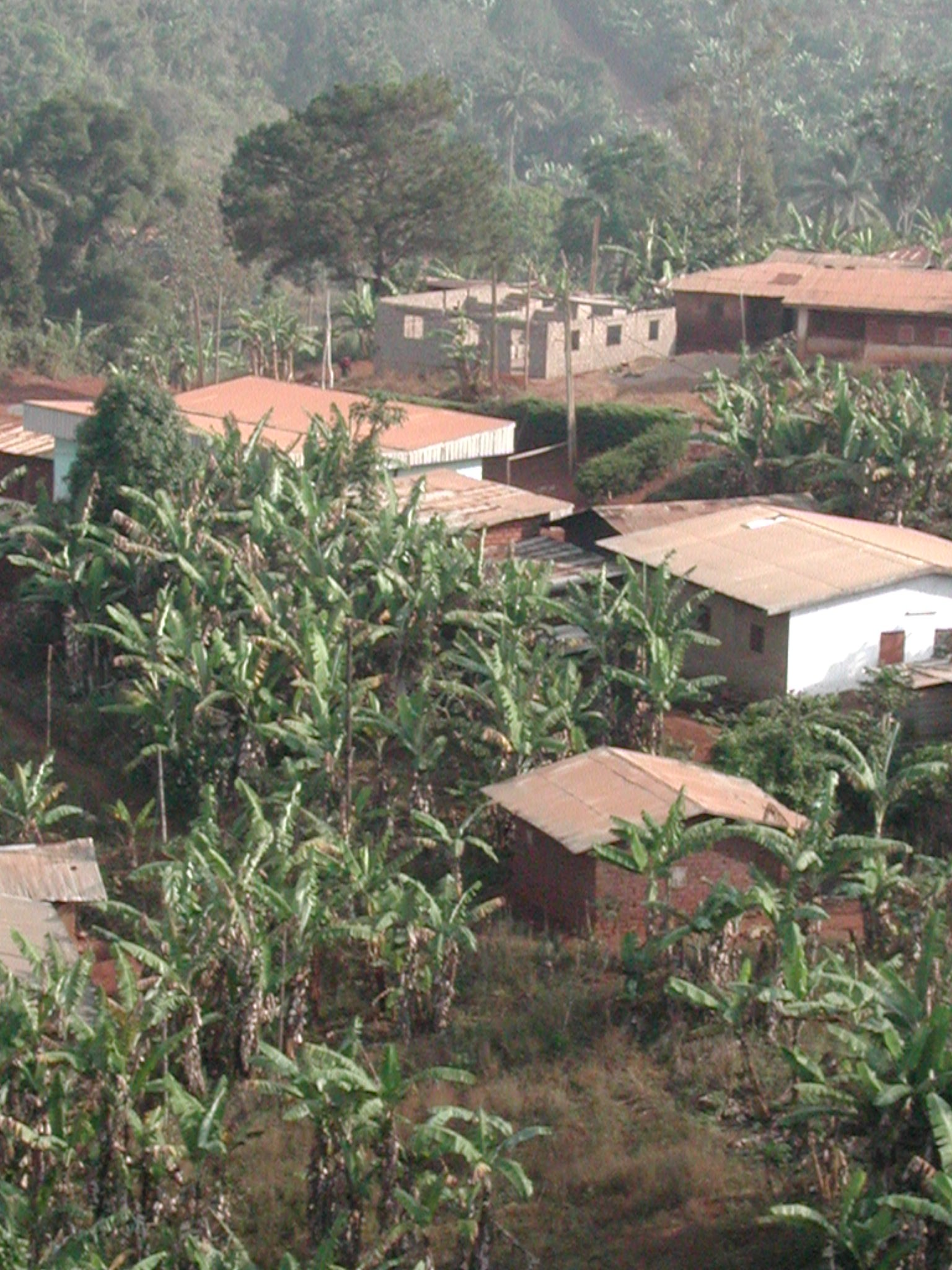
A View of the Village

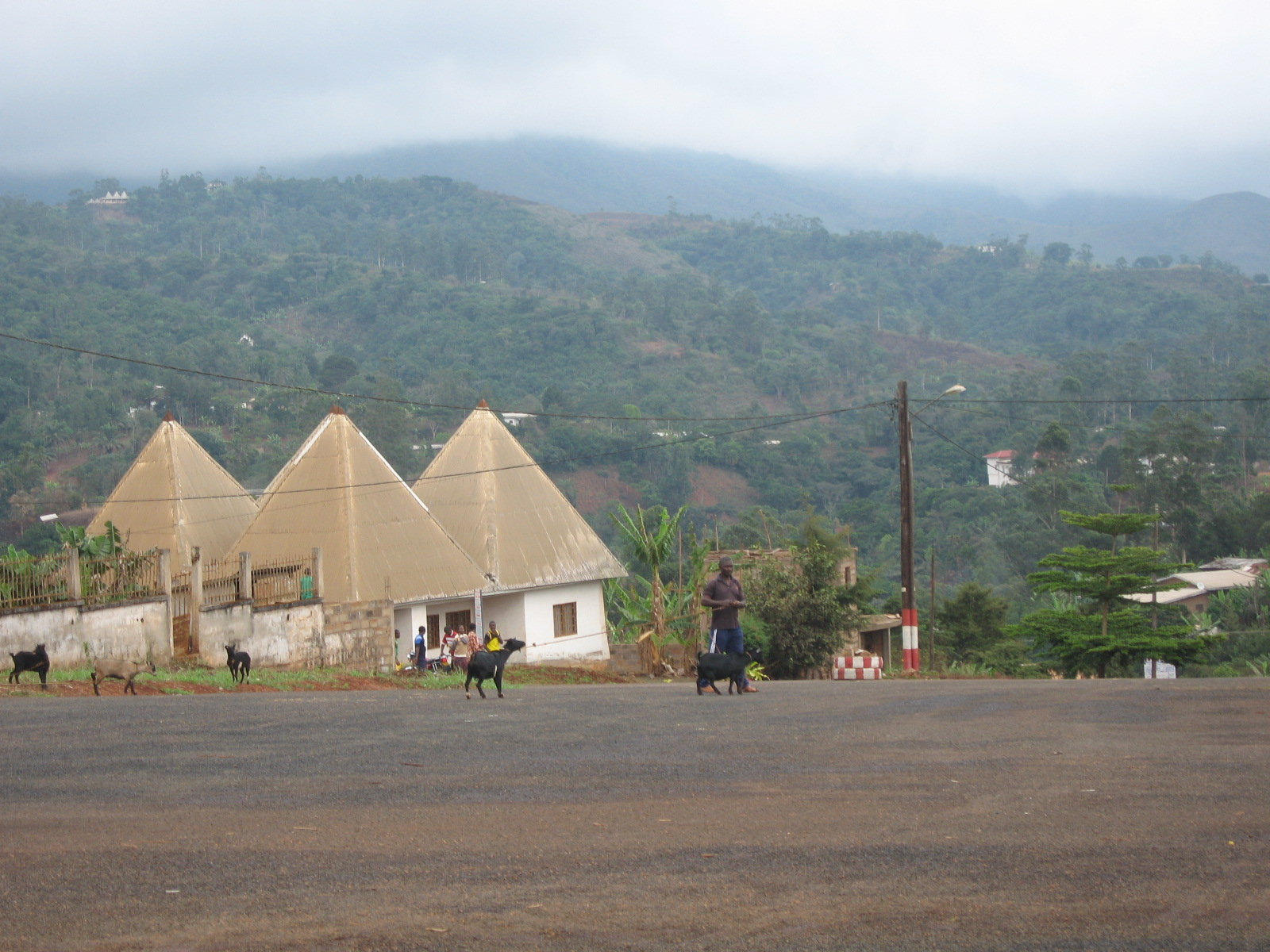
A Street in the Village

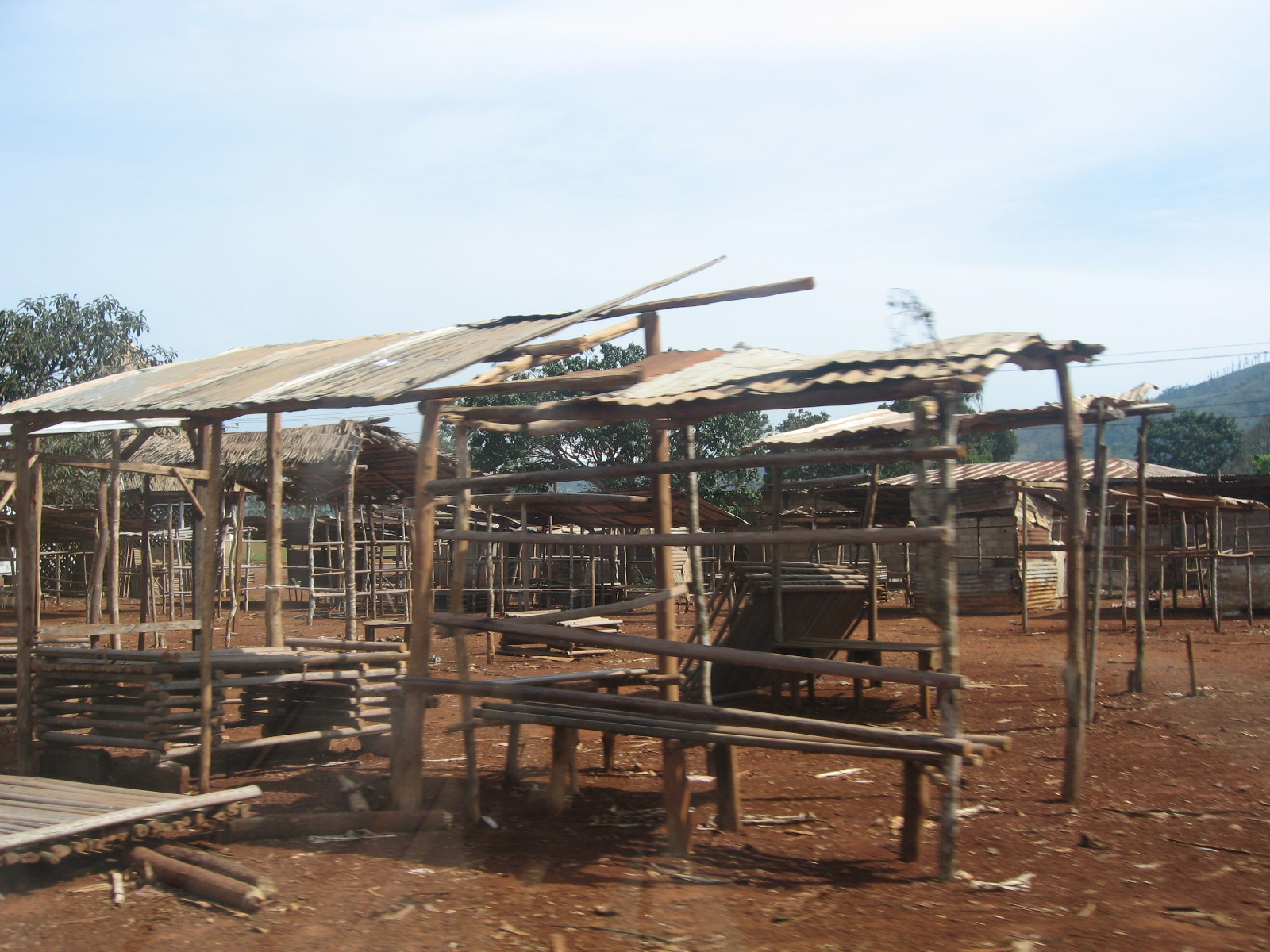
The Market Square in Bana. The market is held every day.

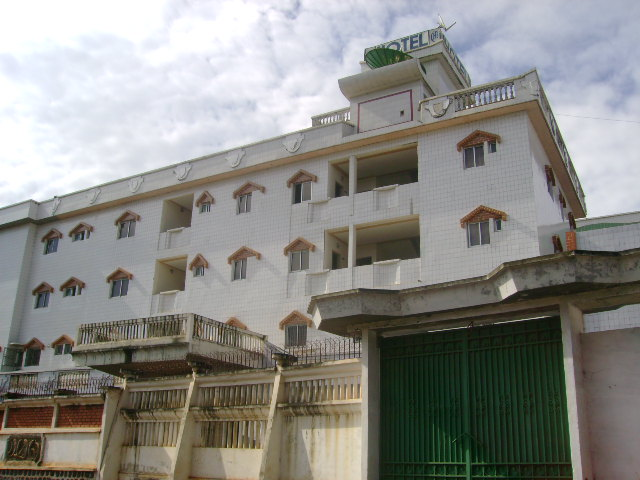
Hotel in Bana

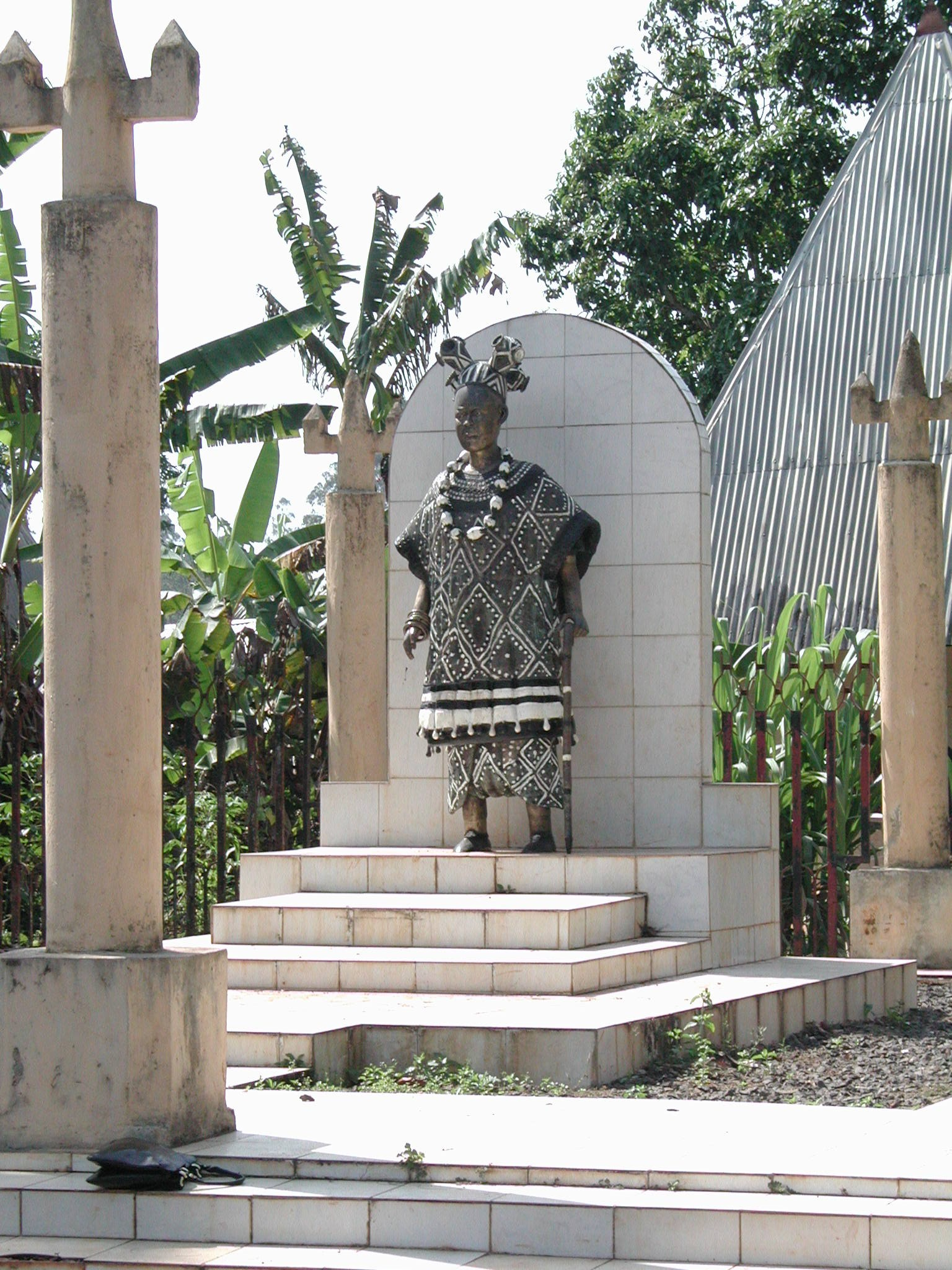
Statue of a traditional chief at the Chefferie

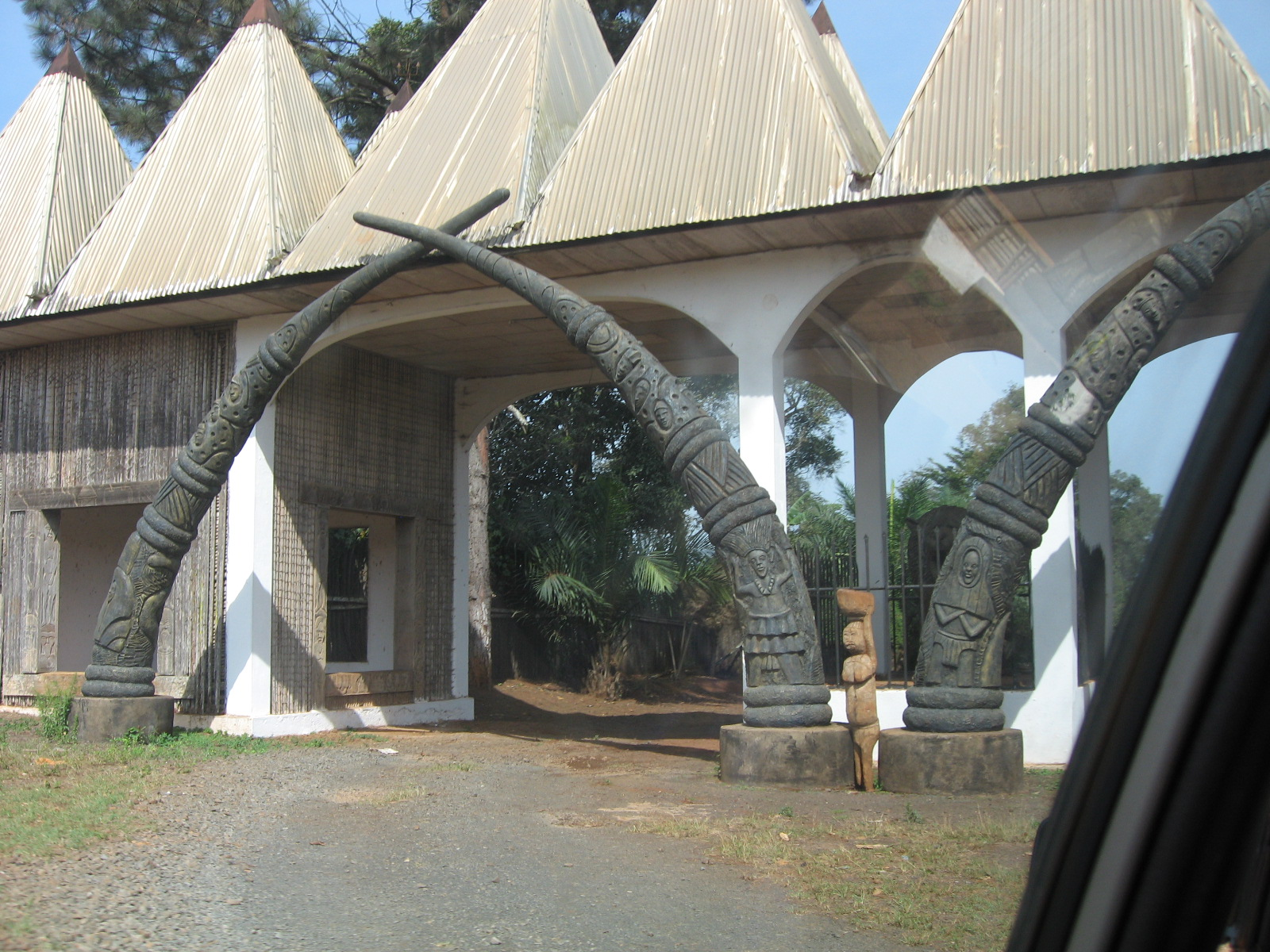
Entry to the Chefferie

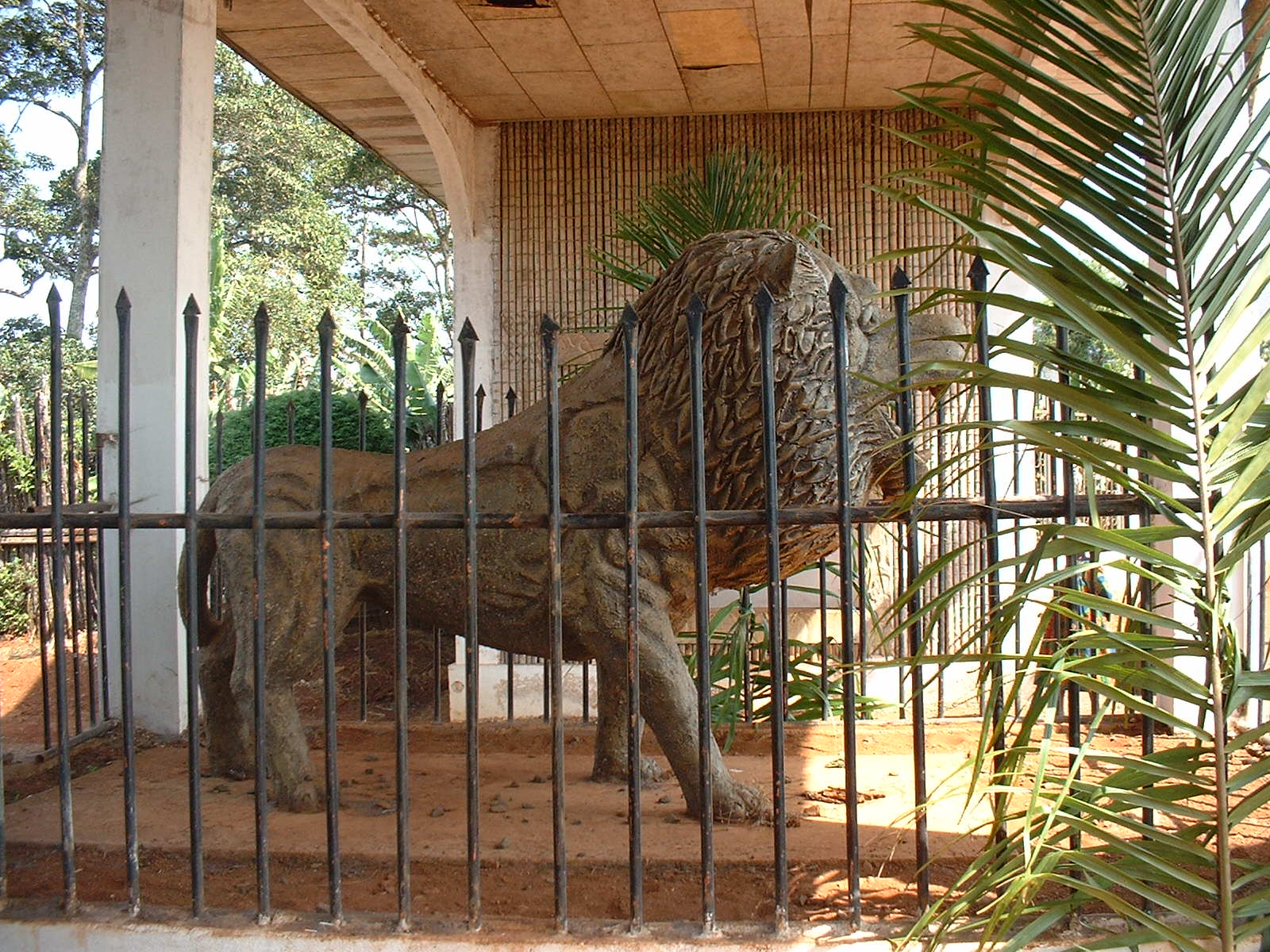
Lion guarding the entrance to the Chefferie

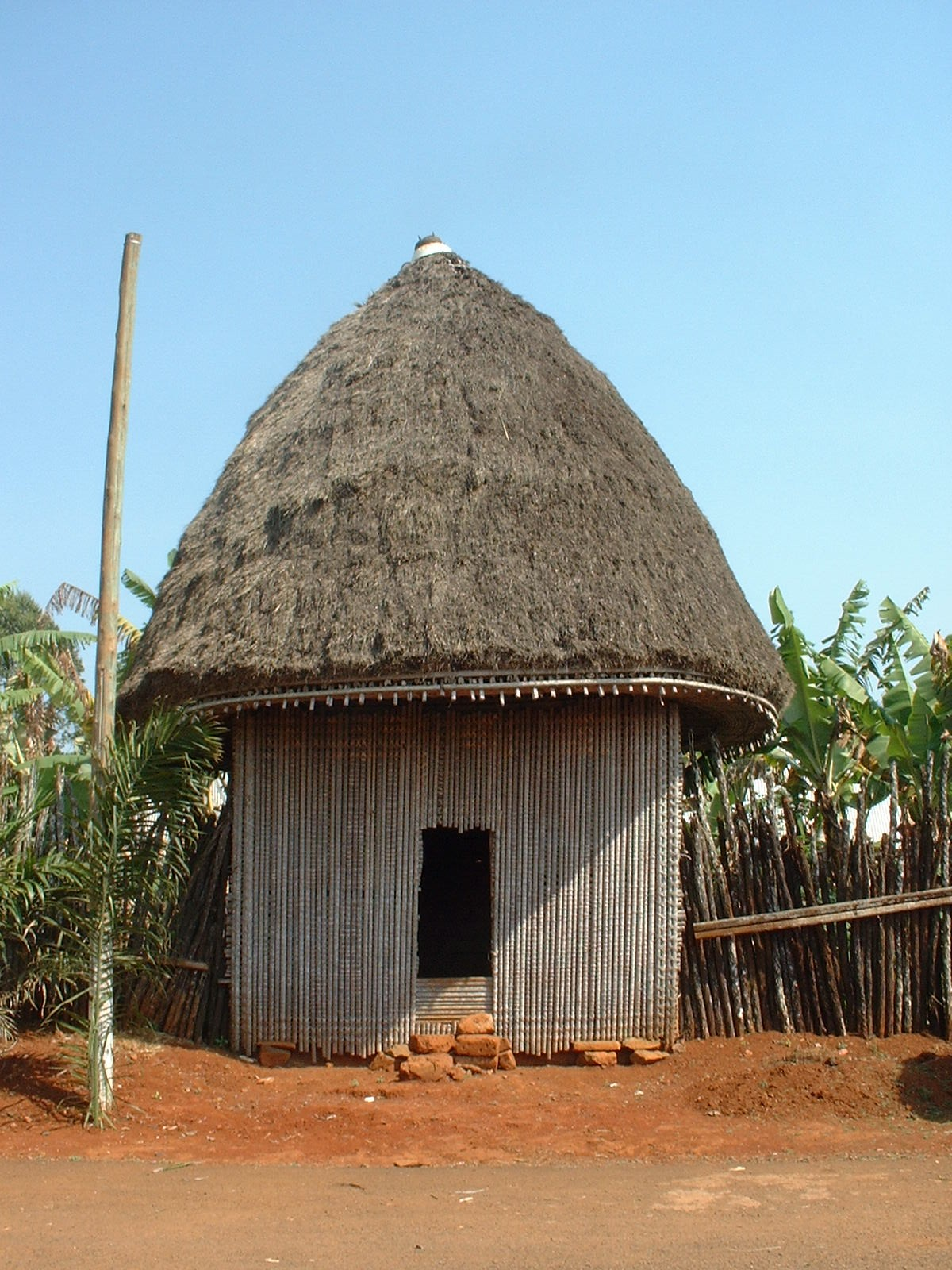
A Hut at the Chefferie

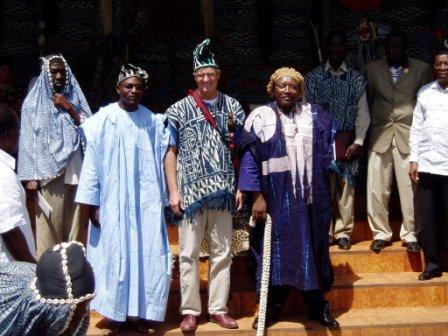
Visit by the US ambassador (wearing traditional indigo clothes) to the Chiefs of Bana (left) and Bandja (right)

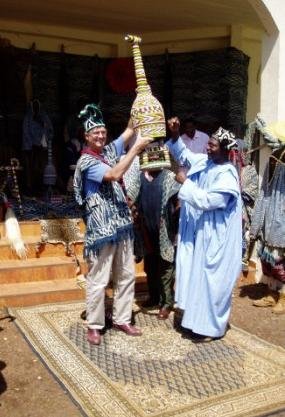
The Chief of Bana presents a gift to the US Ambassador.

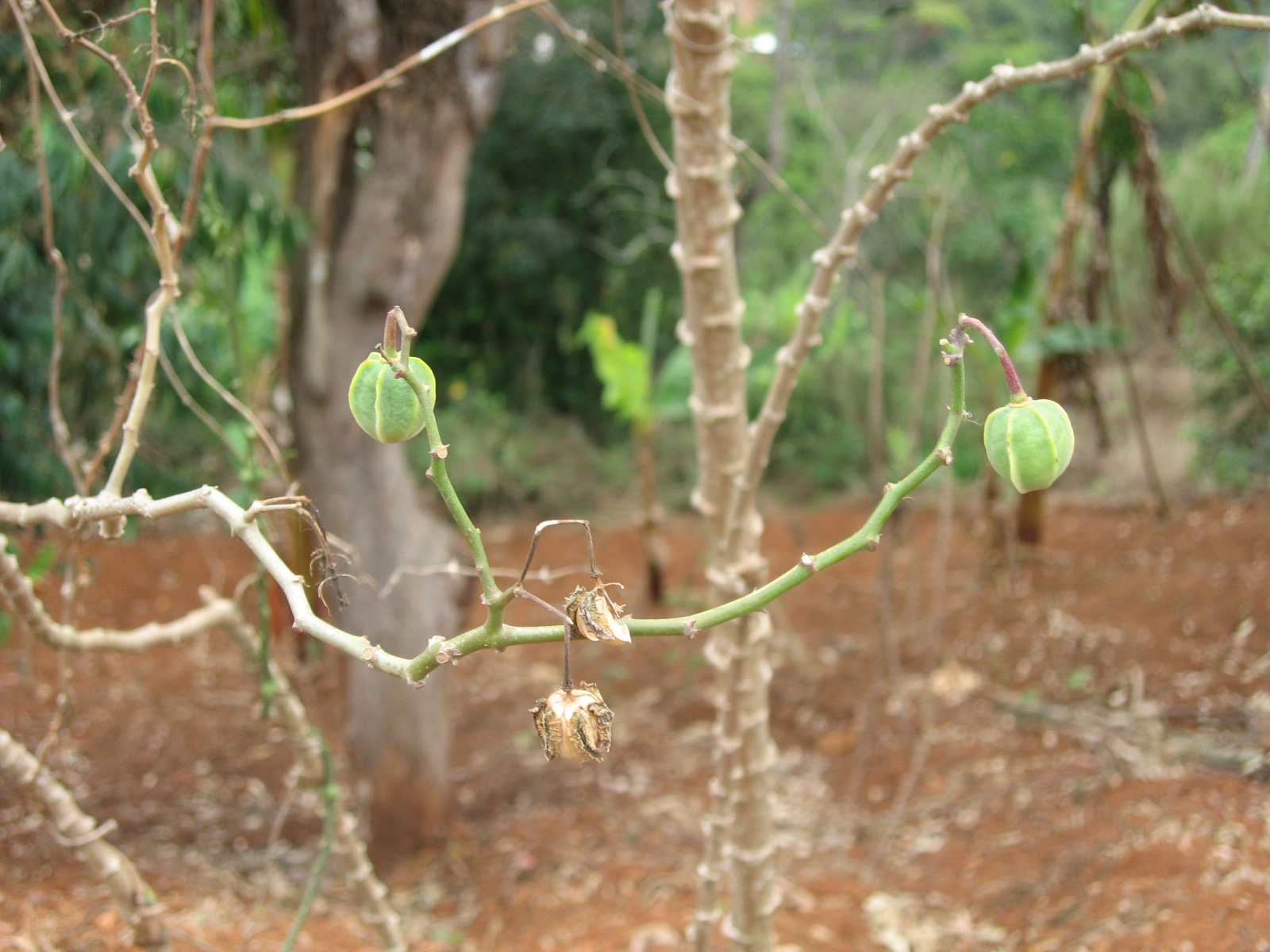
Manioc plants in Bana

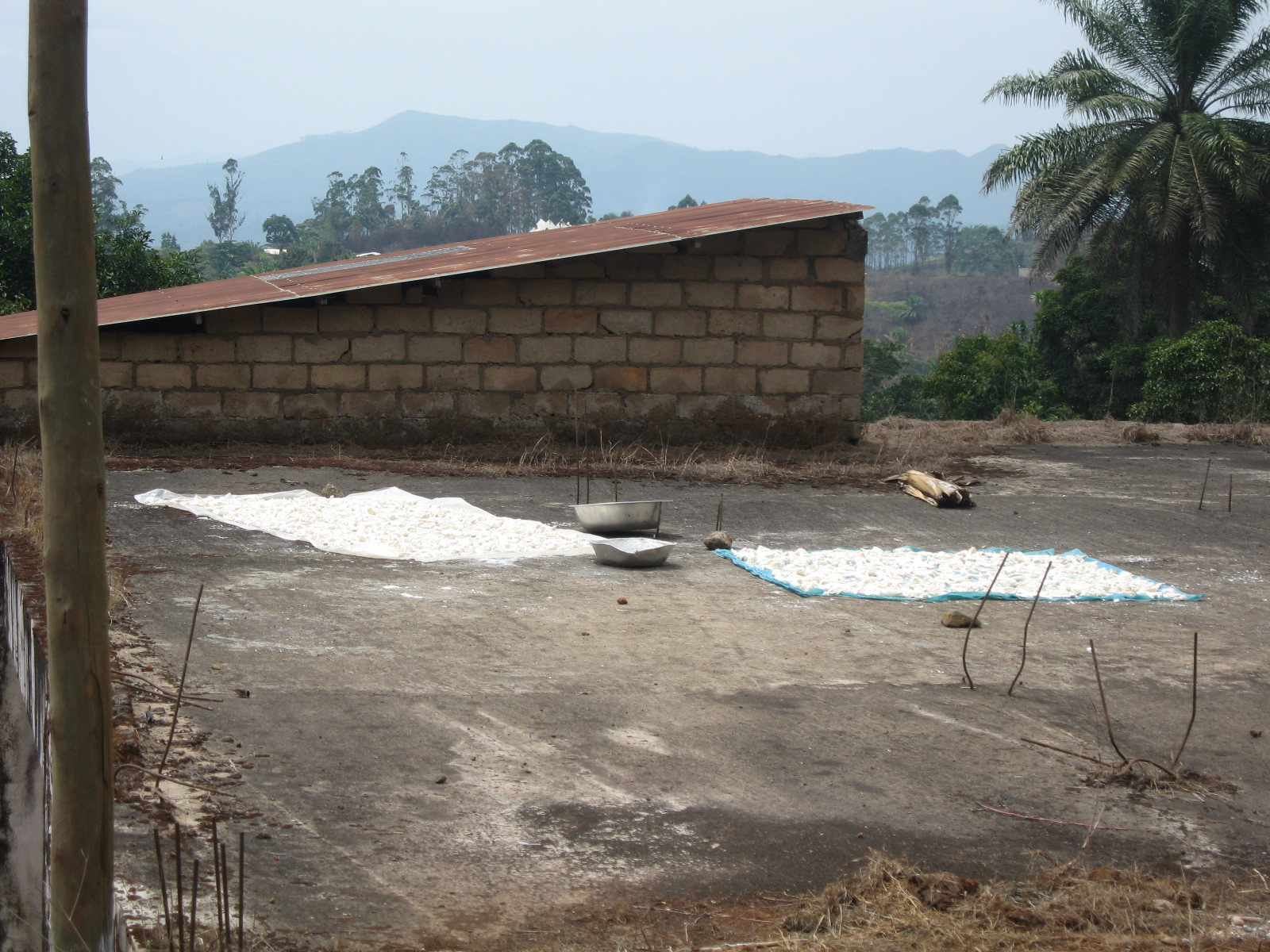
Drying Manioc in Bana

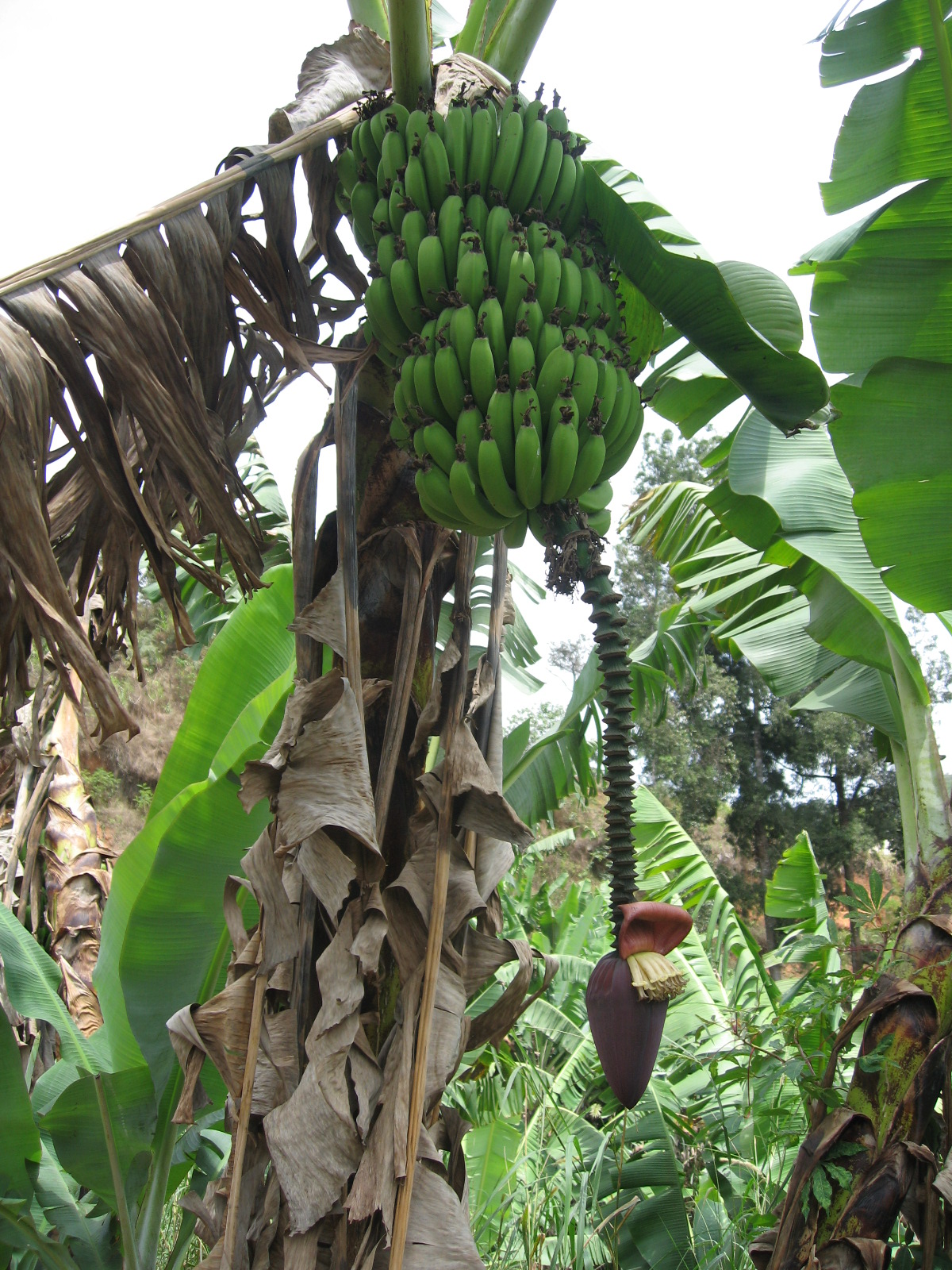
Banana tree in Bana

== See also ==
- Departments of Cameroon

=== External links ===
- Bana on Google Maps
