= Thomas Dakayi Kamga =

Minister of Public Works of Cameroon
- In office 1982–1985

Director of Camair
- In office 2003–2005
- Preceded by: Yves-Michel Fotso

Personal details
- Born: December 6, 1944 Bandja, Haut-Nkam, French Cameroon
- Died: October 26, 2024 (aged 79)

Thomas Dakayi Kamga was a Cameroonian politician who served as Minister of Public Works and the Minister of Equipment from 1982 to 1985.

== Biography ==
Kamga was born on December 6, 1944 in Bandja, in Haut-Nkam, French Cameroon. He graduated at the Ecole Centrale de Paris in 1967 as an engineer. He spoke Feʼfeʼ (also called Nufi) and was Chairman of the Board of Directors of the Nufi Cultural Association, where he promoted literacy in Fe'fe'.

His political career began when he was appointed Deputy Director of Sonel, Minister of Public Works, and Minister of Equipment in the First Bello Bouba Maigari Government between 1982 and 1985. In 1998, Kamga was appointed by the Cameroonian government as the secretary-general of CEMAC.

Between 2003 and 2005, Kamga served as director of Camair, the Cameroonian flagship airline. Under his control, Camair was on the verge of collapse and salaries were not paid for three months between October 2004 and January 2005. Two years later, he founded a consulting company specializing in public works.

Kamga died on October 26, 2024, in Compiègne, France at the age of 79.
