= Pius Njawé =

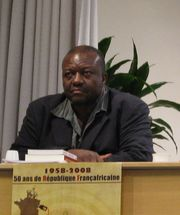
- Pius Njawé at a conference in Paris
- Born: 4 March 1957; Babouantou, Cameroon
- Died: 12 July 2010 (aged 53); Chesapeake, Virginia, US
- Occupation: journalist
- Organization: Le Messager
- Spouse: Jane Njawé
- Children: eight
- Awards: CPJ International Press Freedom Award (1991); Golden Pen of Freedom Award (1993); World Press Freedom Hero (2000)

Pius Njawé (4 March 1957 – 12 July 2010) was a Cameroonian journalist and director of Le Messager as well as Le Messager Populi. Arrested over 100 times for his reporting, Njawé won several awards for his work, including the 1991 CPJ International Press Freedom Award and the 1993 Golden Pen of Freedom. In 2000, he was named one of International Press Institute's fifty World Press Freedom Heroes of the previous fifty years. In Njawé's obituary, the New York Times described him as "a symbol of opposition to the autocratic regime of Paul Biya".

== Life ==
Njawé was born in Babouantou, Cameroon, on 4 March 1957. As a child, he sold newspapers in the street before going on to work for the state-owned newspapers La Gazette and the daily Douala Express. In 1979, at the age of 22, he founded the nation's first independent newspaper, Le Messager.

The paper soon became known for its criticism of long-time President Paul Biya, and it drew a strong government response. Njawé was arrested for the first time in 1981, and would go on to be arrested about 125 more times before his death. In 1990, Le Messager was briefly seized by the government for its reporting on a riot. In 1990, Njawé's publishing of an "open letter" to Biya led to another arrest.

The paper was banned in 1992, forcing Njawé into a short exile in Benin, where he continued to publish. Njawé returned to the country in February 1993 despite being accused by the government of drug dealing, counterfeiting, and sedition; he founded the Cameroon Organization for Press Freedom one month later. In 1996, he was imprisoned on charges of "insulting the president and members of the National Assembly".

In 1998, Njawé was sentenced to two years in prison when Le Messager ran an article suggesting that Biya had a heart condition. The sentence for running this article was later reduced, and due to pressures from Human Rights groups, Njawé was pardoned after almost a year in prison. His wife had miscarried in the interim, reportedly due to mistreatment by prison guards. Njawé wrote a book about his prison experience titled Bloc-notes d'un Bagnard ("Notebooks of a Convict"), which he published in 1998.

Njawé's wife Jane was killed in a car accident in September 2002, causing him to found an organisation calling for safer road conditions in Cameroon. He had eight children.

Shortly before his own death in a car accident, Njawé told an interviewer that "A word can be more powerful than a weapon and I believe that with the word... we can build a better world and make happier people. So, why give up while duty still calls? No one will silence me, except The Lord, before I achieve what I consider as a mission in my native country, in Africa and, why not, in the world."

== Awards ==
In 1991, Njawé was awarded an International Press Freedom Award by the US-based Committee to Protect Journalists. It was the prize's inaugural year. Two years later, he won the World Association of Newspapers' Golden Pen of Freedom Award.

In 2000, he was named one of the Austria-based International Press Institute's fifty World Press Freedom Heroes of the last fifty years. The award citation called him "Cameroon's most beleaguered journalist and one of Africa's most courageous fighters for press freedom".

== Death ==
On 12 July 2010, Njawé was killed when a lorry struck a car in which he was riding in Chesapeake, Virginia, US. Njawé had travelled to the city to attend a meeting of the Cameroon Diaspora for Change.

The member organisations of the International Freedom of Expression Exchange memorialised him as a "torchbearer for press freedom". Reporters Without Borders stated that Njawé "fought every press freedom struggle. We will not forget, for example that he joined us on a visit to Sarajevo, in 1992, to offer support to 'Oslobodenje', the only newspaper that continued to come out during the war in Yugoslavia."
