= Victor Kanga =

Cameroonian politician (1931–1991)

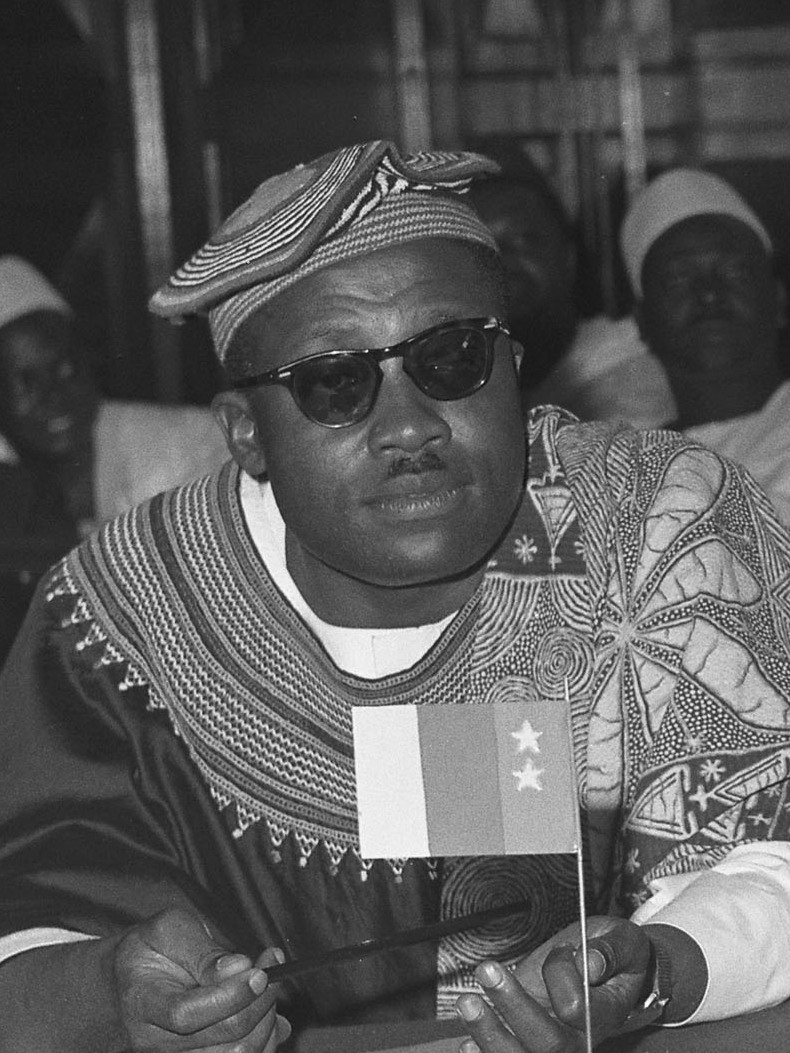
- Kanga in 1963

Minister of Information and Tourism
- In office July 28, 1966 – November 22, 1966

Minister of Finance
- In office July 1, 1964 – July 28, 1966
- Preceded by: Charles Owana Anana
- Succeeded by: Simon Nko'o Etoungou
- In office January 25, 1960 – October 20, 1961
- Preceded by: Position established
- Succeeded by: Emmanuel Egbe Tabi

Personal details
- Born: March 21, 1931 Banka, West Region, French Cameroon
- Died: June 17, 1991 Yaounde, Cameroon

Victor Kanga (March 21, 1931 – June 17, 1991) was a Cameroonian politician who served as a member of Parliament, then Minister of Information and Minister of Finance.

== Biography ==
Kanga was born on March 12, 1932, in Banka, West Region, French Cameroon. He was Bamileke. He pursued his higher education in France, receiving a doctorate of law from the Faculty of Law in Paris. As a student, he served as the President of the Association of Cameroonian Students in Paris.

Kanga served in several positions in the Cameroonian government between his return to Cameroon in 1957 and Cameroonian independence in 1960. On January 25, 1960, he was appointed Cameroon's first Minister of Education under Ahmadou Ahidjo at the age of 29. Between 1960 and 1961, Kanga also presided over the Ministry of Justice. He was appointed Minister of the National Economy in 1961. Kanga was appointed Minister of Finance in 1964 during a cabinet reshuffle, and then Minister of Information and Tourism in 1966 amidst a second cabinet reshuffle. On November 22, 1966, he was dismissed from this position.

Kanga was elected deputy in the National Assembly for the Bamileke-majority Cameroonian Union for Douala in 1960. He served as a deputy until 1964. In 1966, Kanga and other members of the Cameroonian Union, including Ernest Ouandié, were arrested. Kanga was tortured at the Military Brigade in Yaounde and convicted of spreading false news by the Yaounde Military Tribunal. He was released four years later.

Kanga died on June 17, 1991.
