= Fomudam Rose Ngwari =

Cameroonian magistrate and politician (born 1959)

Rose Mbah Acha

Minister Delegate at the Presidency in Charge of the Supreme State Audit
- Incumbent
- Assumed office 2 October 2015
- Prime Minister: Philémon Yang; Joseph Ngute
- Preceded by: Henri Eyebe Ayissi

Personal details
- Born: 1959 (age 66–67) Mbengwi, Cameroon
- Party: CPDM

Rose Mbah Acha (born Fomundam Rose Ngwari) is a Cameroonian magistrate and politician who has served as Minister Delegate for the Supreme State Audit since 2015. A member of the Cameroon People's Democratic Movement, she previously served as president of the Administrative Court of the Northwest Region and as vice president of the Southwest Region Court of Appeal.

== Biography ==
Mbah Acha was born Fomundam Rose Ngwari in 1959 in the Momo department of the Northwest Region. She spent part of her early life in Mbengwi, the capital of Momo. She studied at the University of Yaoundé before entering the National School of Administration and Magistracy (ENAM), where she trained in the magistracy.

Mbah Acha pursued a career in the Cameroonian judiciary, serving as a magistrate and subsequently holding senior judicial positions. She served as vice-president of the Court of Appeal of the Southwest Region and later became president of the Administrative Court of the Northwest Region in Bamenda.

On 18 December 2014, she was appointed to the rank of magistrate hors hiérarchie (second group), a prestigious appointment made by the President of the Republic.

On 2 October 2015, President Paul Biya appointed Mbah Acha Minister Delegate at the Presidency in charge of Supreme State Audit in a government reshuffle. She succeeded Henri Eyebe Ayissi in the position. In this position, she is responsible for the supreme audit of public financial management in government administrations, state enterprises and semi-public bodies, including administrative and financial oversight.

In May 2020, Mbah Acha was appointed an Officer of the Order of Valour by presidential decree.
