= Augustin Kontchou Kouomegni =

Cameroonian political figure (born 1945)

Augustin Kontchou Kouomegni (born 1945) is a Cameroonian political figure who served in the government of Cameroon from 1990 to 2001. As Minister of Information and then Minister of Communication, Kontchou was a prominent and controversial figure, reviled by the opposition, during the political turmoil of the early 1990s. Later, he was Minister of State for Foreign Affairs from 1997 to 2001 and chairman of the board of directors of the University of Douala from 2005 to 2008.

Kontchou was born in Nkongsamba. He was secretary-general of the National Federation of Cameroonian Students from 1968 to 1969, and in 1988 he became president of the Cameroonian Association of Political Science. He was first appointed to the government as Minister of Information and Culture on 7 December 1990.

Following student protests in April 1991, which were broken up by force, Kontchou claimed that there were "none dead" ("zéro mort"); the opposition, challenging this claim, turned it into an anti-government slogan. He served as Minister of Information until he was appointed as Minister of Communication and Government Spokesman in the government named on April 9, 1992. He held this post during the controversial October 1992 presidential election, which was officially won by President Paul Biya, although the opposition alleged fraud. Both before and after the election, he frequently appeared on Cameroon Radio Television (CRTV) to defend Biya and criticize the opposition, although he ignored a challenge by Bernard Muna, the campaign manager for opposition candidate John Fru Ndi, to participate in a live televised debate. According to Muna, Kontchou "effectively control[led] and manipulate[d]" the media and used it to "deceive the people". When Fru Ndi was placed under house arrest amidst violence and a state of emergency in the Northwest Province in late October 1992, Kontchou said that "if [Fru Ndi] was free, it would be a danger to the entire country". Following the election, Kontchou was promoted to the rank of Minister of State, while retaining the communication portfolio, on November 27, 1992. After five years in that position, he was named Minister of State for Foreign Affairs on December 7, 1997. He served as foreign minister for over three years until he was replaced by François-Xavier Ngoubeyou in the government named on April 27, 2001.

On September 2, 2005, Kontchou was appointed as chairman of the board of directors of the University of Douala; he was installed in that post on September 13. Kontchou remained chairman of the board of directors for over three years before Biya dismissed him in late December 2008.

His partner is the businesswoman Françoise Puene.

== Bibliography ==
- Augustin Kontchou Kouomegni, Le système diplomatique africain. Bilan et tendances de la première décennie, Pédone, 1977

Preceded by Ferdinand Léopold Oyono	Foreign Minister of Cameroon; 1997-2001	Succeeded by François Xavier Ngoubeyou
