= Jean-Marie Atangana Mebara =

Cameroonian politician

Minister of State for Foreign Affairs
- In office 7 September 2006 – 7 September 2007
- President: Paul Biya
- Preceded by: Laurent Esso
- Succeeded by: Henri Eyebe Ayissi

Secretary-General of the Presidency
- In office August 2002 – September 2006
- President: Paul Biya

Minister of Higher Education
- In office December 1997 – August 2002
- President: Paul Biya

Personal details
- Born: 27 March 1954 (age 72)
- Citizenship: Cameroonian
- Party: Cameroon People's Democratic Movement

Jean-Marie Atangana Mebara (born 27 March 1954) is a Cameroonian politician. He was the Minister of Higher Education from December 1997 to August 2002, the Minister of State and Secretary-General of the Presidency from August 2002 to September 2006, and the Minister of State for Foreign Affairs from September 2006 until he was dismissed from the government in a cabinet reshuffle on 7 September 2007.

Mebara was a member of the national committee for the coordination of President Paul Biya's re-election campaign in the October 2004 presidential election. His dismissal in September 2007 was said to have been linked to his reported desire to succeed Biya, in addition to Biya's disapproval of a communiqué issued as a retort to Western criticisms of the July 2007 parliamentary election.

Mebara has been detained since August 2008 at the central prison of Yaoundé. He is accused of an "attempt" to embezzle 31 million US dollars. The accusation is based on a reply to a letter he received from the General Manager of Aircraft Portfolio Management - an international aviation consulting firm. In that letter, Mebara accepted the offer made to him by the General Manager to try and protect government funds that GIA has misappropriated and were illegitimately holding in their accounts to provide a presidential aircraft to the president of Cameroon. GIA went bankrupt in 2004.

Contrary to public belief, Mebara was not involved in the purchase of a BBJ presidential aircraft which was consummated by his predecessor. The Justice Department in Cameroon is struggling to find any witnesses against him.

Mebara has suffered immense physiological and mental trauma since being held captive in prison on trumped-up corruption charges. He is a devout Christian and has the support of Cardinal Tumi an important person in the Cameroon Christian hierarchy.

On 3 May 2012, Mebara was acquitted by presiding judge Gilbert Schlickof the Mfoundi high court in Yaoundé of all charges of embezzling or attempting to misappropriate the BB jet funds.

On Monday, 7 May 2012, the examining judge went to Kondengui prison and issued "new" charges against Mebara in order to keep him in prison. The persecution of Mebara continues because he is still perceived as a threat to the systemically corrupt regime of Paul Biya.

Preceded by Laurent Esso	Foreign Minister of Cameroon; 2006-2007	Succeeded by Henri Eyebe Ayissi
