= Le Messager =

Logo of Le Messager

Le Messager is a daily newspaper in Cameroon. It was founded in 1979 by Pius Njawé, who in 2009 said that he had been arrested 126 times in 30 years. Reporters without Borders called it "the country’s first campaigning newspaper."
