= Simon Nko'o Etoungou =

Cameroonian diplomat and politician (1932–2002)

4th Minister of Foreign Affairs of Cameroon
- In office 25 May 1965 – 28 July 1966
- President: Ahmadou Ahidjo
- Preceded by: Benoît Balla
- Succeeded by: Benoît Bindzi

Minister of Finance
- In office 28 July 1966 – 15 January 1968
- President: Ahmadou Ahidjo
- Preceded by: Victor Kanga
- Succeeded by: Bernard Bidias à Ngon

Minister of Foreign Affairs of Cameroon
- In office 15 January 1968 – 12 June 1970
- President: Ahmadou Ahidjo
- Preceded by: Benoît Bindzi
- Succeeded by: Raymond N'Thepe

Personal details
- Born: February 14, 1932 Meyomessala, French Cameroon
- Died: August 12, 2002 (aged 70) Meyomessala, Cameroon
- Occupation: Diplomat, politician

Simon Nko'o Etoungou (14 February 1932 – 12 August 2002) was a Cameroonian diplomat and politician who served multiple terms as the Minister of Foreign Affairs and as the Minister of Finance under President Ahmadou Ahidjo during the early post-independence era of the Republic of Cameroon.

== Early career and diplomatic appointments ==
Nko'o Etoungou was born on 14 February 1932 in Meyomessala, located in the South Region of French Cameroon. Following the independence of Cameroon and the establishment of formal diplomatic relations with foreign powers, he entered the diplomatic corps.

In 1964, he was appointed as the Ambassador Extraordinary and Plenipotentiary of the Republic of Cameroon to the Soviet Union, serving as the mission head in Moscow from 1964 until late 1965. He was succeeded in the Moscow posting by Aimé-Raymond N'Thepe.

== Political career ==
=== First term as Minister of Foreign Affairs (1965–1966) ===
On 25 May 1965, President Ahmadou Ahidjo recalled Nko'o Etoungou from Moscow to join the national cabinet, appointing him as the 4th Minister of Foreign Affairs. He held this position until a government restructuring on 28 July 1966, where he was succeeded by Benoît Bindzi.

=== Minister of Finance (1966–1968) ===
During the cabinet shakeup of 28 July 1966, Nko'o Etoungou was reassigned to head the Ministry of Finance, succeeding Victor Kanga. He managed the nation's budgetary portfolios through subsequent government alignments, including the key cabinet mandate formed on 20 May 1967. He remained in this post until January 1968, when Bernard Bidias à Ngon was appointed to the role.

=== Second term as Minister of Foreign Affairs (1968–1970) ===
Nko'o Etoungou returned to lead the Ministry of Foreign Affairs on 15 January 1968. During this tenure, he played a central role in managing regional borders and navigating diplomatic disputes within the Gulf of Guinea.

He also directed the Cameroonian delegation to the United Nations General Assembly, addressing the assembly during the international general debates in October 1969. His ministerial term concluded on 12 June 1970, when Raymond N'Thepe was brought in to direct national diplomacy.

== Later diplomatic career ==
Following his departure from the domestic cabinet, Nko'o Etoungou returned to external diplomatic deployments. In January 1972, he was appointed as the Head of the Mission of Cameroon to the European Communities (later the European Union) and concurrently served as Cameroon's Ambassador to the Netherlands, presenting his credentials to European officials in Brussels on 26 January 1972. He continued in this international envoy capacity through the late 1970s.

== Death ==
Nko'o Etoungou died on 12 August 2002 in his hometown of Meyomessala at the age of 70. Historical photographic profiles of his administrative mandates are preserved within European public networks.
