= Félix Tonye Mbog =

Cameroonian politician (1934–2022)

Minister of Foreign Affairs
- In office 1983–1984
- Preceded by: Paul Dontsop
- Succeeded by: William Eteki Mboumoua

Personal details
- Born: 14 May 1934 Sodibanga, Nyong-et-Kéllé, French Cameroon
- Died: 2 July 2022 (aged 88)
- Education: University of Yaoundé; National School of Administration and Magistracy

Félix Tonye Mbog (14 May 1934 – 2 July 2022) was a Cameroonian politician. He served in multiple ministerial roles from 1975 to 1985.

== Biography ==
Félix Tonye Mbog was born in Sodibanga on 14 May 1934 and earned his first degree in 1951. From 1951 to 1959, he studied at the Petit Séminaire d’Akono and earned a baccalauréat at the Lycée Joss de Douala. From 1962 to 1966, he studied at the Faculty of Law and Economic Sciences of the University of Yaoundé. At the same time, he attended the National School of Administration and Magistracy in Yaoundé and the Institut international d'administration publique in Paris.

In 1966, Félix Tonye Mbog became an administrator in the office of the President of Cameroon. He then served as Minister of Youth and Sports from 3 July 1972 to 8 November 1979. Under his leadership, Cameroon hosted the 1972 African Cup of Nations. He then served as Minister of Agriculture from 8 November 1979 to 6 November 1982. He served as Minister of Foreign Affairs from 1983 to 1984. Finally, he was Minister of Posts and Telecommunications from 7 July 1984 to 23 August 1985.

Felux Tonye Mbog served as Deputy Director-General of SODECAO from 26 April 1986 to 23 December 1987, and Director-General from 23 December 1987 to 25 January 1991. He was known for creating the nickname the Indomitable Lions for the Cameroon national football team. In January 2022, he took part in the dedication of his biography, written by Édouard Oum.

Félix Tonye Mbog died in Yaoundé on 2 July 2022 at the age of 88.
