= Henri Eyebe Ayissi =

Cameroonian politician and diplomat

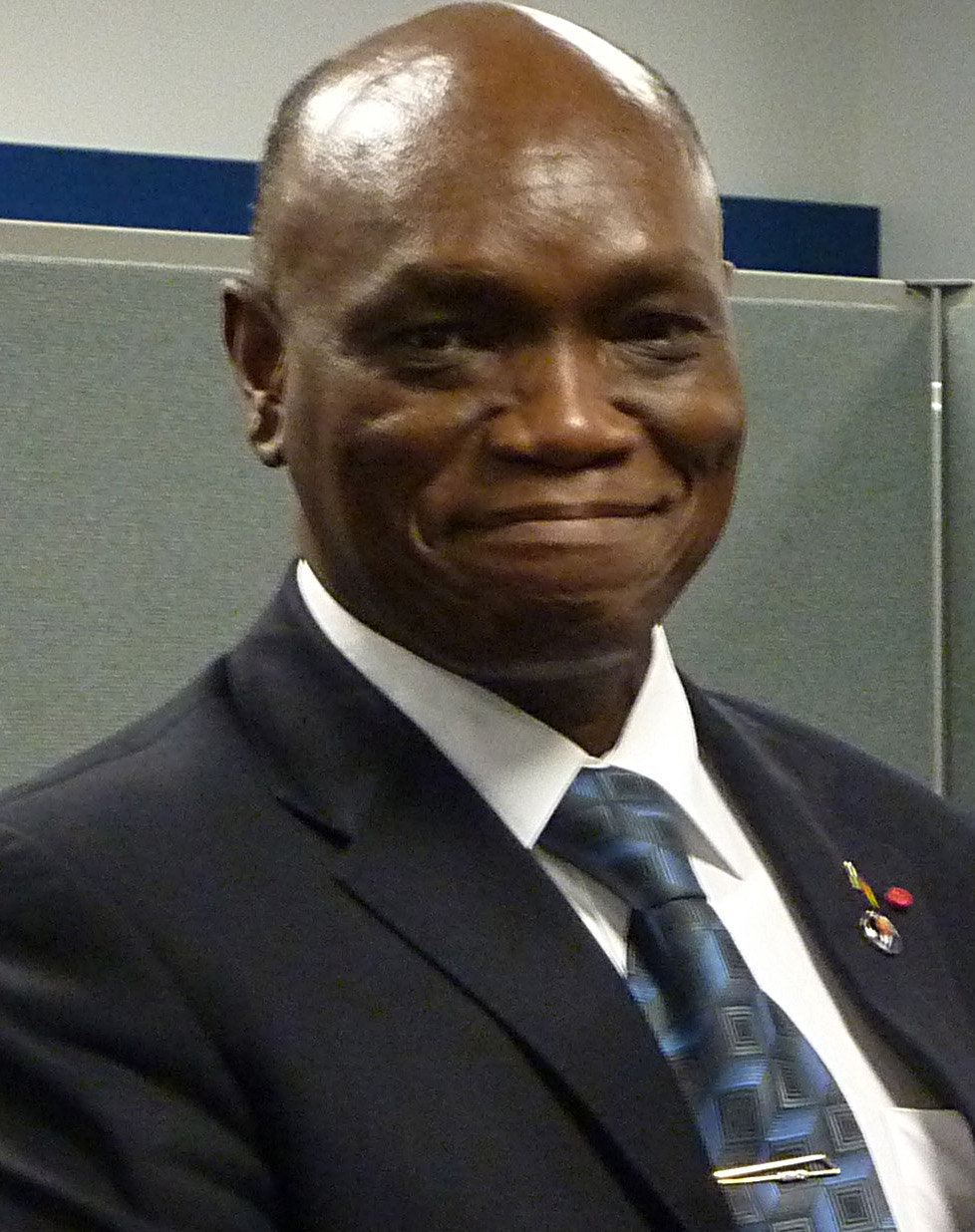

Cameroon Minister of Agriculture and Rural Development
- Incumbent
- Assumed office 02 October 2015
- President: Paul Biya
- Prime Minister: Philémon Yang
- Preceded by: Lazare Essimi Menye

Minister Delegate at the Presidency in charge of Supreme State Control
- In office 09 December 2011 – 1 October 2015
- President: Paul Biya
- Prime Minister: Philémon Yang
- Preceded by: Siegfried David Etame Massoma
- Succeeded by: Fomudam Rose Ngwari

Cameroon Minister of External Relations
- In office 7 September 2007 – 8 December 2011
- President: Paul Biya
- Prime Minister: Ephraïm Inoni; Philémon Yang
- Preceded by: Jean-Marie Atangana Mebara
- Succeeded by: Pierre Moukoko Mbonjo

Cameroon Minister of Urban Planning and Housing
- In office 8 September 1990 – 26 November 1992
- President: Paul Biya
- Prime Minister: Sadou Hayatou

Personal details
- Born: 24 September 1955 (age 70) Douala (Cameroon)
- Party: CPDM
- Education: University of Yaoundé; ENAM

Henri Eyebe Ayissi (born September 24, 1955) is a Cameroonian politician and diplomat who served in the government of Cameroon as Minister of Foreign Relations from 2007 to 2011. He was Minister-Delegate at the Presidency for the Higher Audit Office from 2011 to 2015 and has been Minister of Agriculture since 2015.

== Biography ==
Eyebe Ayissi was born in Mbellé, a village in Obala District, Lekie Department, Center Province. After working at the Inspection Générale of the State from November 1981 to September 1982, he worked under the Prime Minister as Head of the Department of Legal Studies and Deputy Director of Legislative and Regulatory Affairs from September 1982 to February 1984. From August 1984 to September 1985 he worked at the Ministry of Public Service as Head of the Division of Research and Regulations. From September 1985 to January 1987, he was First Chargé d'études in the Division of Legal Affairs at the Ministry of Planning, and on January 7, 1987, he became Secretary of Ministerial Councils at the Presidency. He was then appointed to the government as Minister of Urban Planning and Housing on September 7, 1990, serving in that position until he was replaced in the government named on November 27, 1992.

In 1998, Eyebe Ayissi became Inspector-General of the Services of the Ministry of Higher Education, and he subsequently served as Inspector-General on Electoral Issues at the Ministry of Territorial Administration and Decentralisation. He was appointed as Foreign Minister by President Paul Biya on September 7, 2007, replacing Jean-Marie Atangana Mebara, and he was installed in office on September 10, 2007.

He was moved to the post of Minister-Delegate at the Presidency for the Higher Audit Office in December 2011 and then to the post of Minister of Agriculture and Rural Development on 2 October 2015.

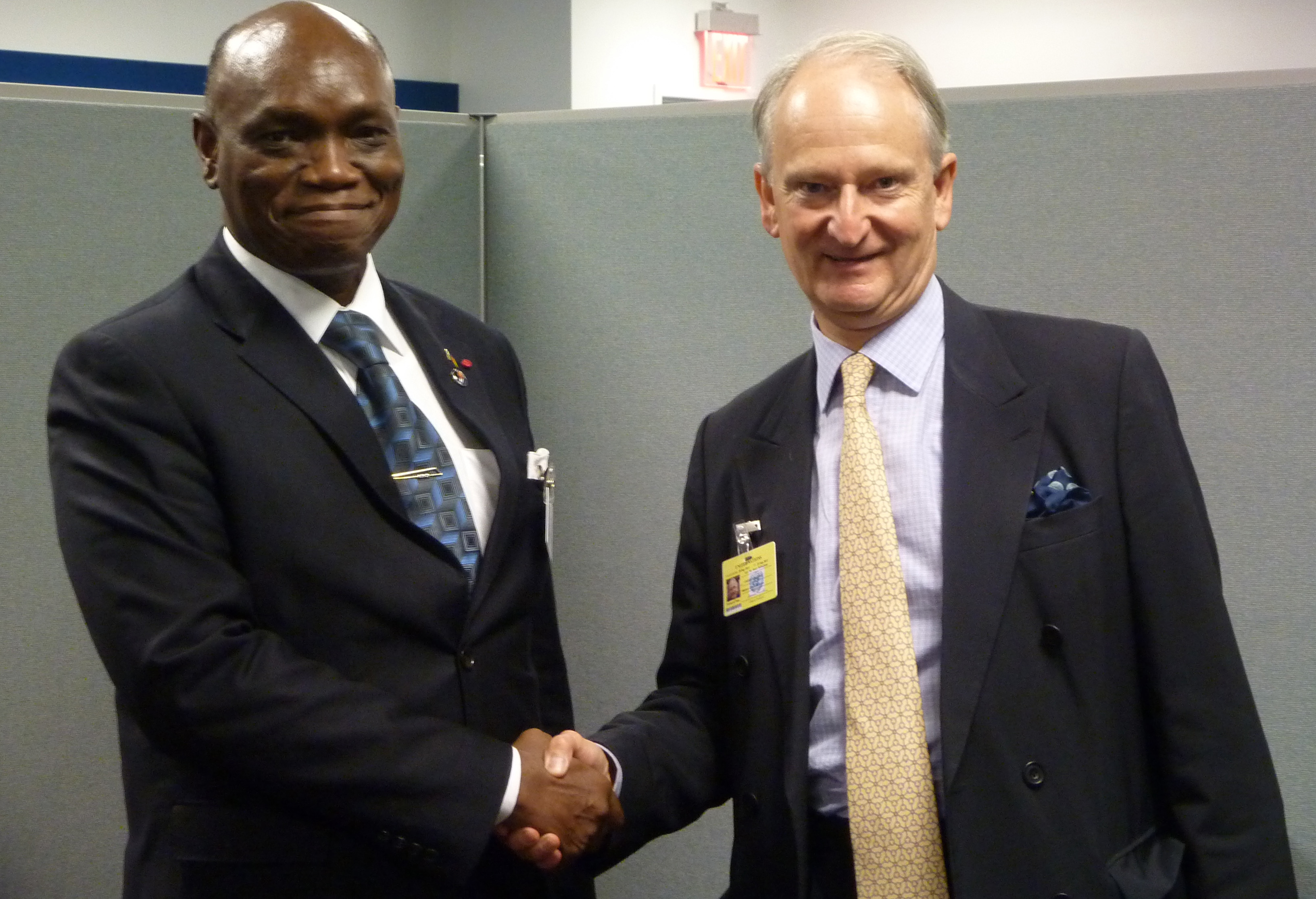
Minister for Africa Henry Bellingham met Cameroon's Foreign Minister Henri Ayissi in New York

Preceded by Jean-Marie Atangana Mebara	Foreign Minister of Cameroon; 2007–2011	Succeeded by Pierre Moukoko Mbonjo
