= Bandja =

Coordinates: 5°27′N 10°16′E

- Commune and town
- Interactive map of Bandja
- Country: Cameroon
- Region: West
- Department: Haut-Nkam
- Time zone: UTC+1 (WAT)

Bandja is a town and commune in Haut-Nkam, West Region, Cameroon.

== See also ==
- Communes of Cameroon
