= Babouantou =

Coordinates: 5°10′15.8″N 10°17′15.1″E

- Commune and town
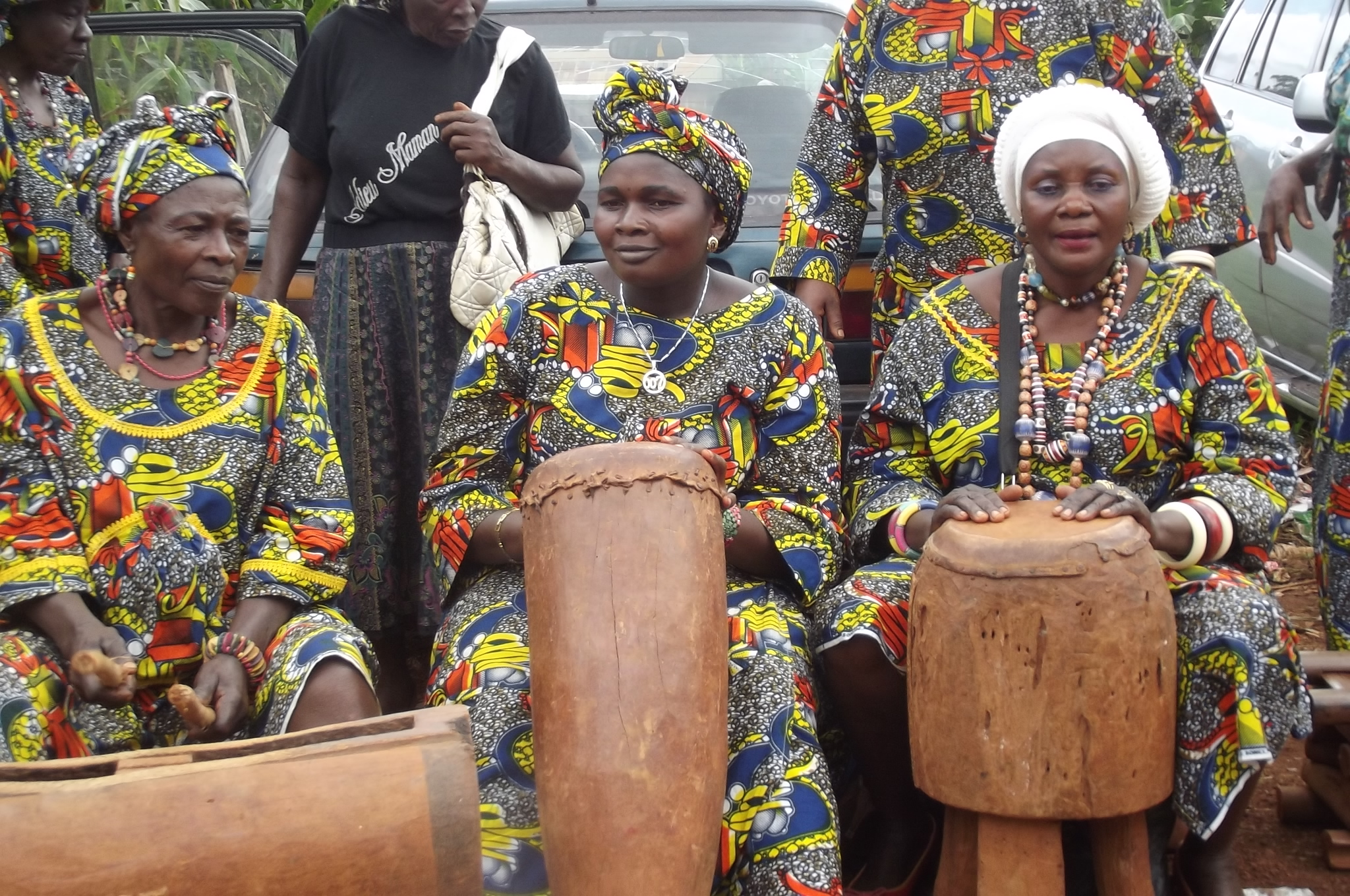
- Women from the Cameroonian town playing traditional music
- Interactive map of Babouantou
- Country: Cameroon
- Region: West
- Department: Haut-Nkam
- Time zone: UTC+1 (WAT)

Babouantou is a town and commune in Haut-Nkam, West Region, Cameroon.

== See also ==
- Communes of Cameroon
