= Bafang =

Town in West Province, Cameroon

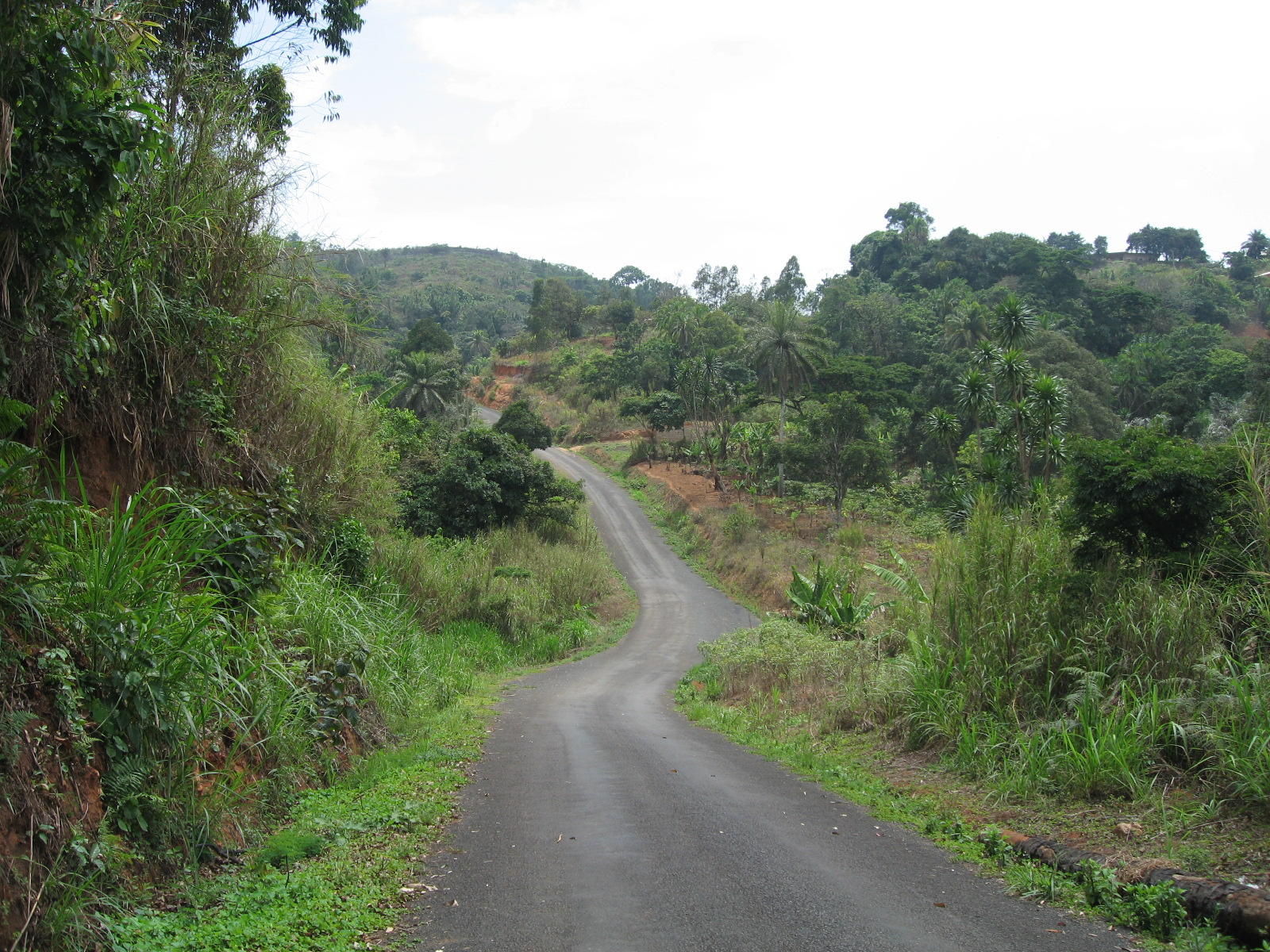
- Bafang Road

- Location in Cameroon
- Coordinates: 5°09′N 10°11′E
- Country: Cameroon
- Province: West Province
- Division: Haut-Nkam
- Elevation: 1,235 m (4,052 ft)

Population (2012)
  - Total: 33,324

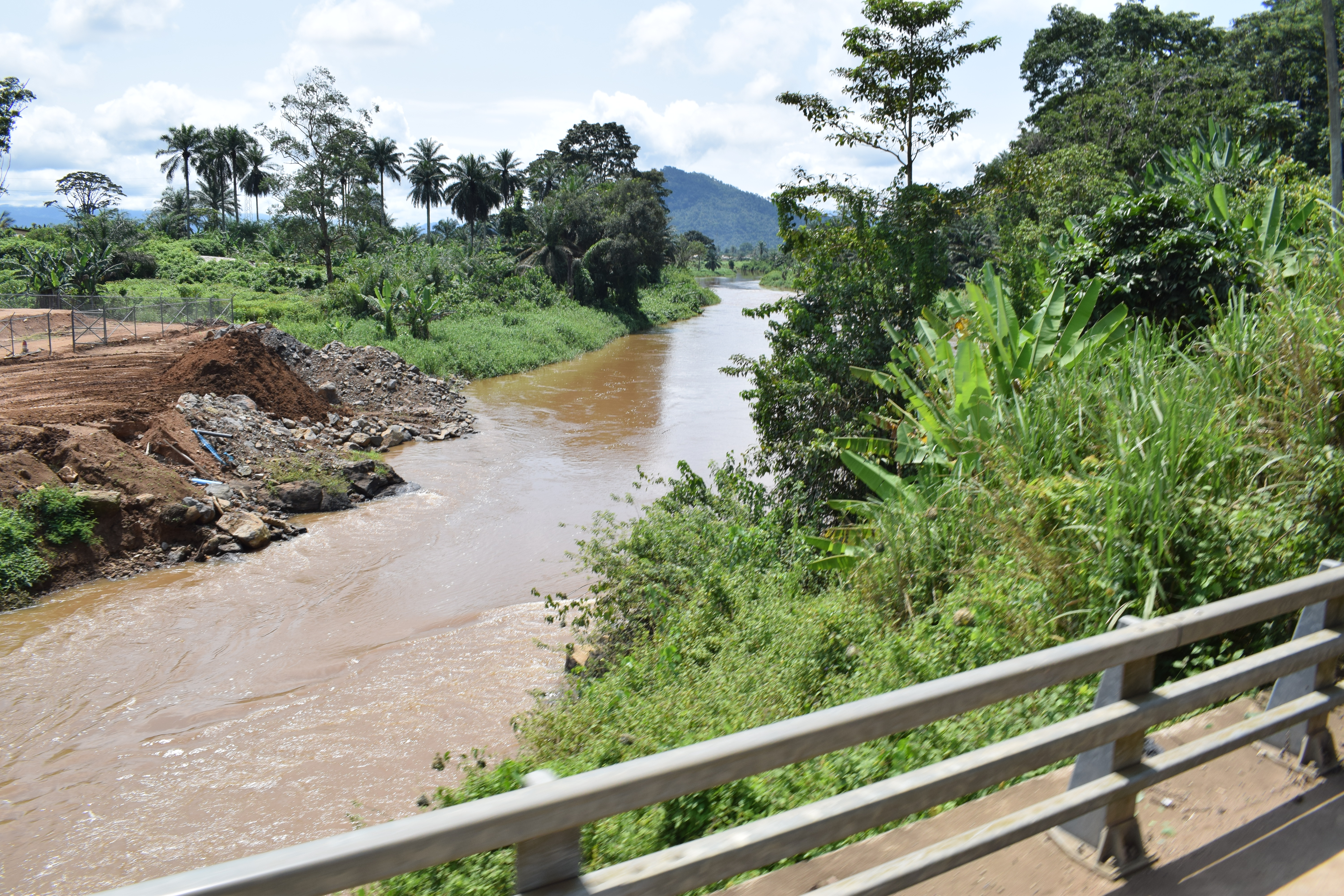
Nkam River in Bafang

Bafang is a town and commune in Cameroon situated in the Haut-Nkam division of the West Province.

It lies at the heart of the territory of the Bamiléké people, and has a population of roughly 33,324. (2012)

== Religion ==
Its cathedral, Cathédrale du Cœur-Immaculé de Marie, is the See of the Roman Catholic Diocese of Bafang, a suffragan of the Metropolitan Archdiocese of Douala, like the Roman Catholic Diocese of Nkongsamba, which it was split off from in 2011.

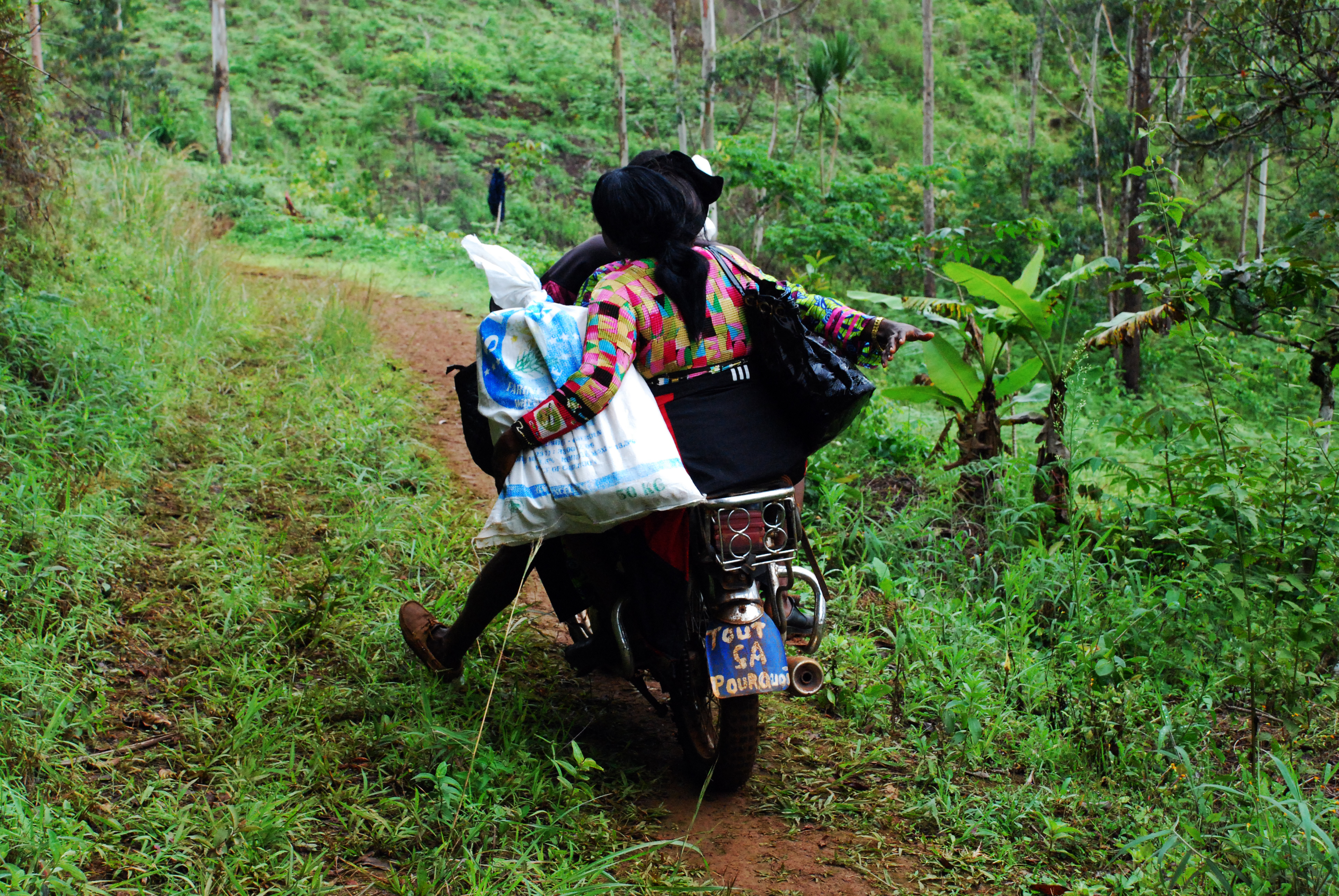
Moto transport in Bafang

== Notable people ==
- Tony Tchani, professional football player
- Michael Ngadeu-Ngadjui, professional football player of Slavia Prague and Cameroon National Team
- Ulrich Chomche, professional basketball player

== See also ==
- Communes of Cameroon
