= Haut-Nkam =

Department in West Province, Cameroon

- Department
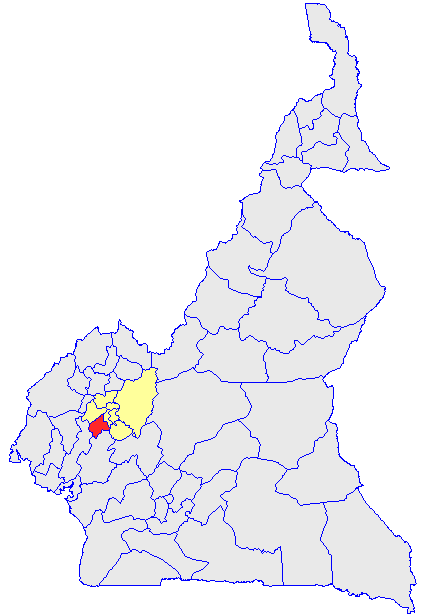
- Department location in Cameroon

- Location within Cameroon Location within Africa
- Country: Cameroon
- Province: West Province
- Capital: Bafang

Area
  - Total: 370 sq mi (958 km^{2})

Population (2005)
  - Total: 191,600
- Time zone: UTC+1 (WAT)

Haut-Nkam is a department of West Province in Cameroon. The department covers an area of 958 km^{2} and as of 2005 had a total population of 191,600. The capital of the department lies at Bafang.

== Subdivisions ==
The department is divided administratively into 7 communes and in turn into villages.

=== Communes ===
- Bana
- Bafang (urban)
- Bafang (rural)
- Bandja
- Banka
- Bakou
- Batcheu
