= Xavier Ngoubeyou =

Cameroonian politician (1937 – 2024)

François-Xavier Ngoubeyou (10 May 1937 – 24 February 2024) was a Cameroonian politician who served as a Senator.
