= Banka, Cameroon =

Banka
- Commune and town
- Location in Cameroon
- Coordinates: 5°10′N 10°12′E
- Country: Cameroon
- Time zone: UTC+1 (WAT)

Banka, Cameroon is a town and commune in Cameroon.

== See also ==
- Communes of Cameroon
