= Wouri River =

River in Cameroon

Coordinates: 4.08333°N 9.7°E

Wouri
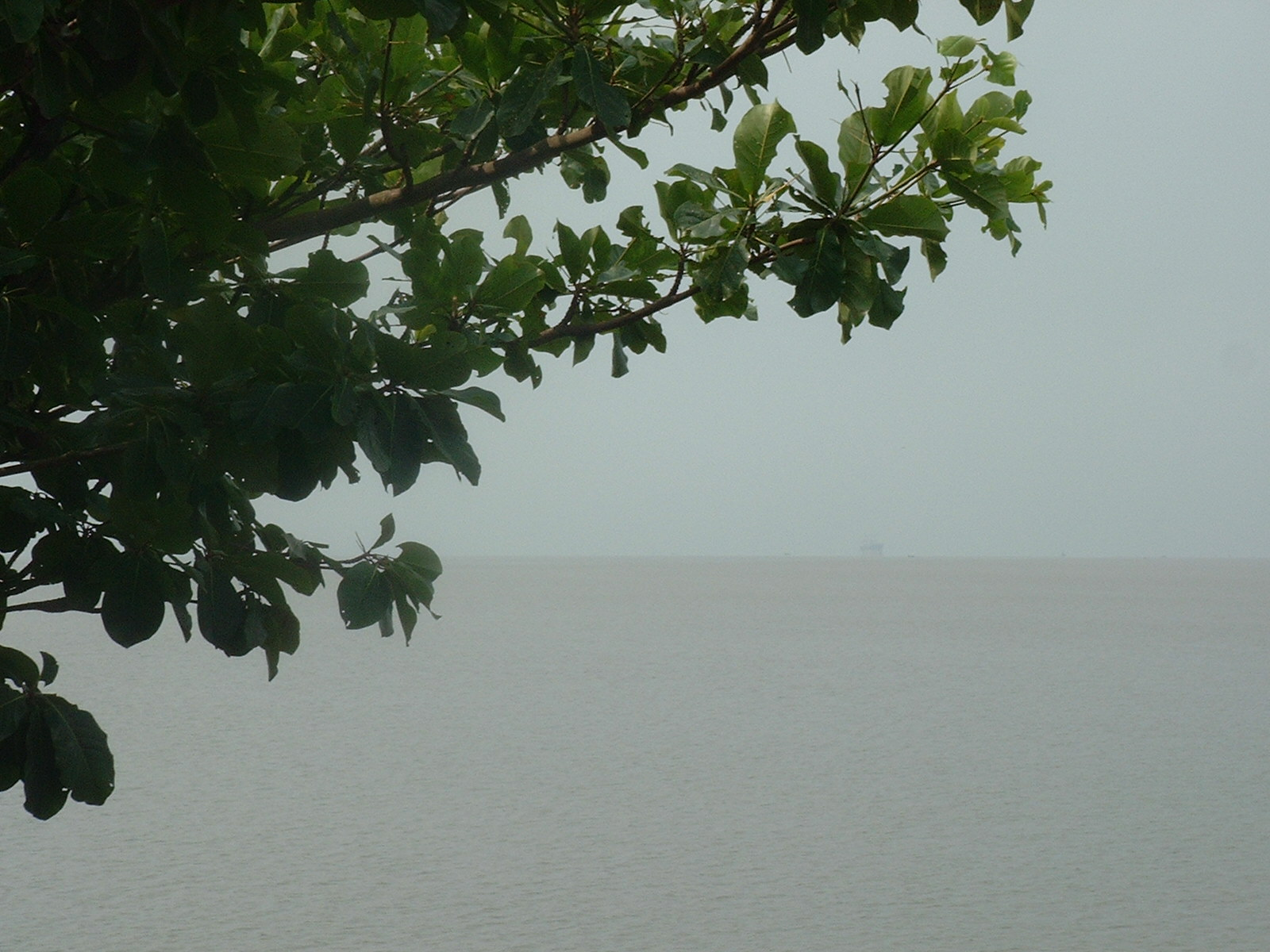
- The estuary of the Wouri River

Physical characteristics
- Source: Confluence of Nkam and Makombé
- Length: 160 km (99 mi)

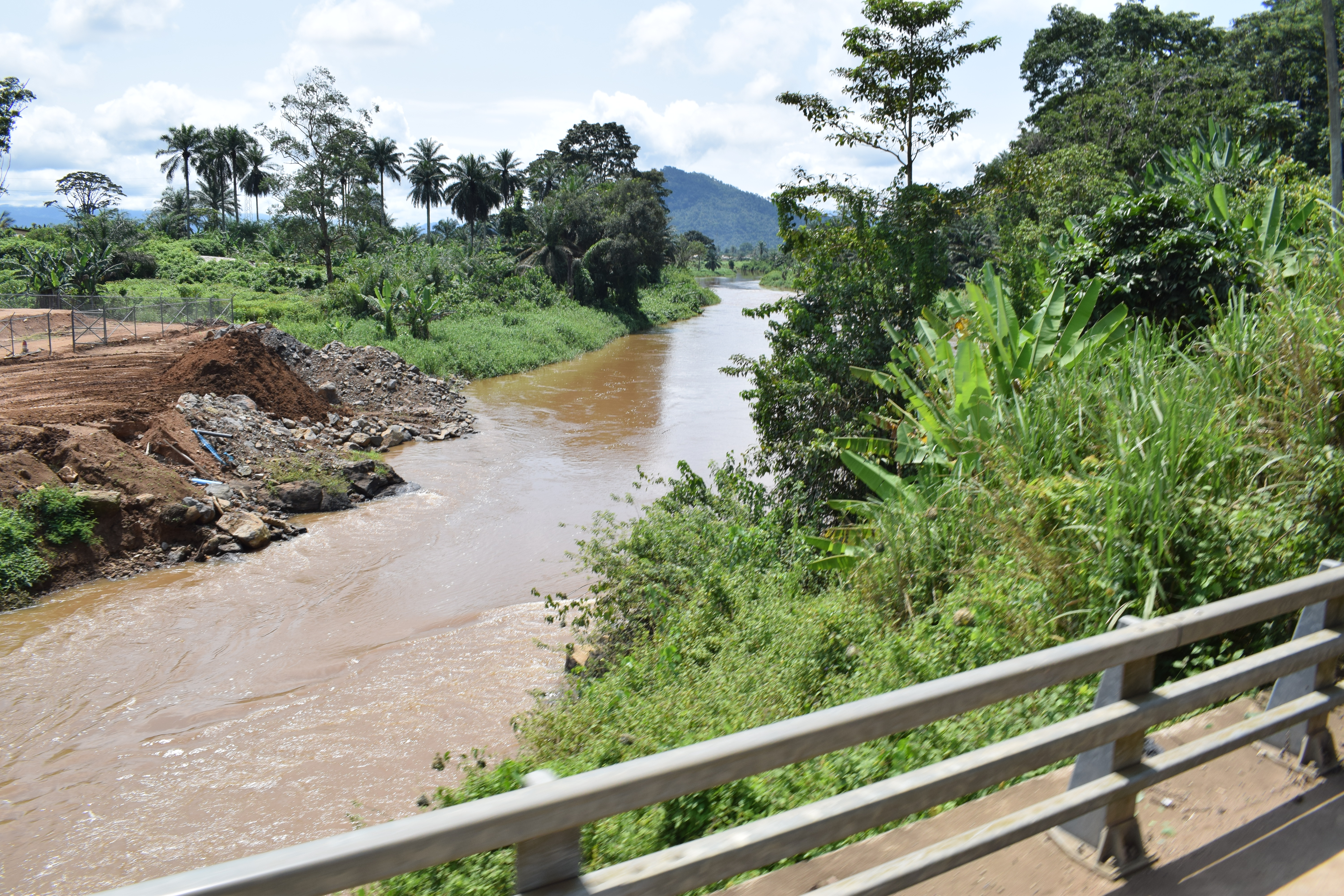
Nkam River

The Wouri (also Vouri or Vuri) is a river in Cameroon. Cameroon has many water bodies and amongst these are two major rivers, the Sanaga, the longest at about 525 km (325 miles) long and the Wouri, the largest. The Wouri forms at the confluence of the rivers Nkam and Makombé, 32 km (20 mi) northeast of the city of Yabassi. It then flows about 160 km (99 mi) southeast to the Wouri estuary at Douala, the chief port and industrial city in the southwestern part of Cameroon on the Gulf of Guinea. The river is navigable about 64 km (40 mi) upriver from Douala.

== Exploration ==
The Portuguese navigator and explorer Fernão do Pó or Fernando Pó, is believed to be the first European to explore the estuary of the Wouri, around the year 1472. The explorers noted an abundance of the mud lobster Lepidophthalmus turneranus in the Wouri River and named it "Rio dos Camarões", Portuguese for "River of Prawns", and the phrase from which the name Cameroon derived. The phrase "Rio dos Camarões" later became Camarones when the Spanish arrived in the region. Then, during the German protectorate in the country which started in 1884, the country's name changed to Kamerun before the Treaty of Versailles placed the country under French and British authority in 1919 which led to the final name "Cameroon".

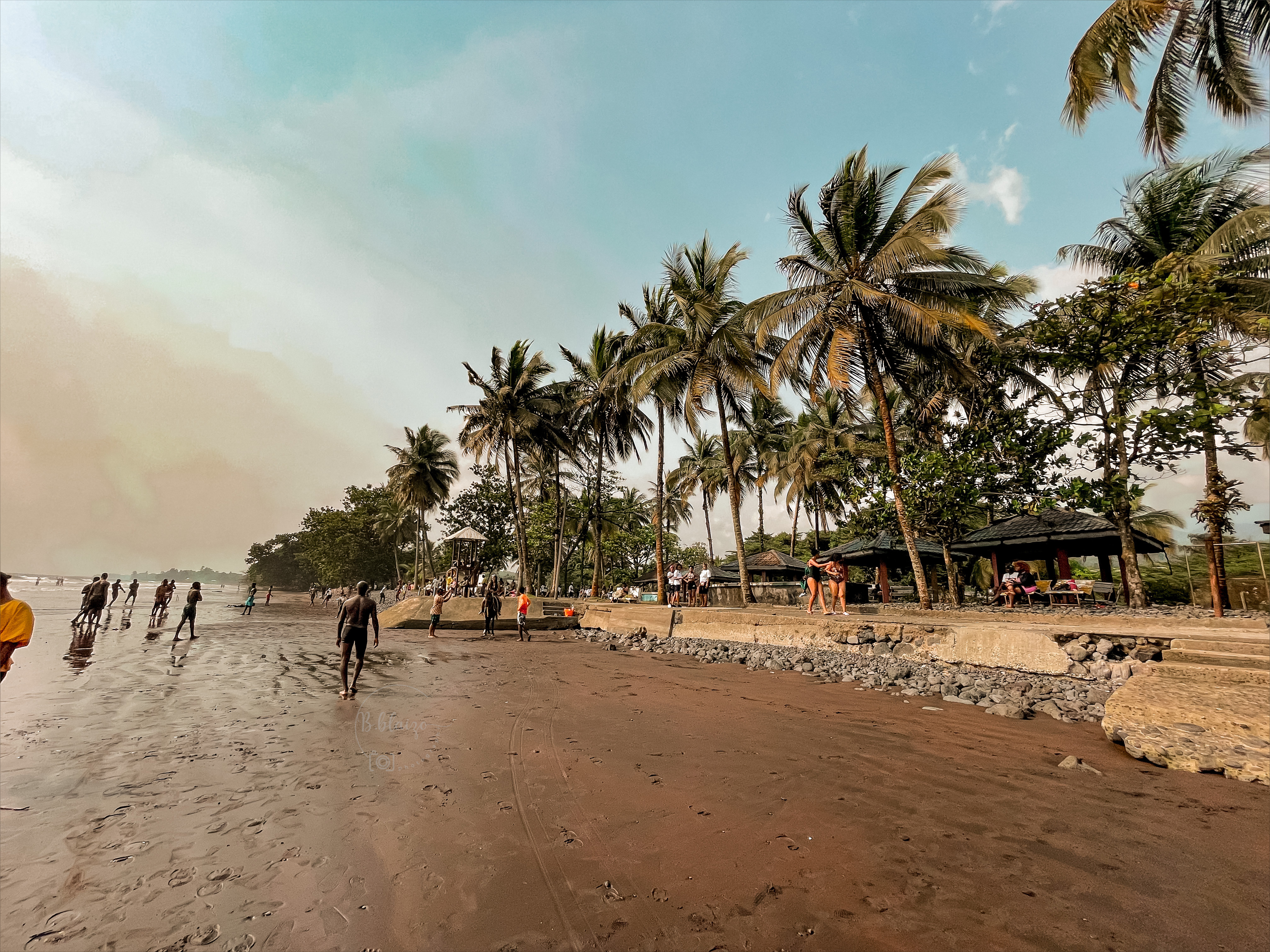
Seme beach limbe Cameroon

== Bridges ==
=== First bridge ===
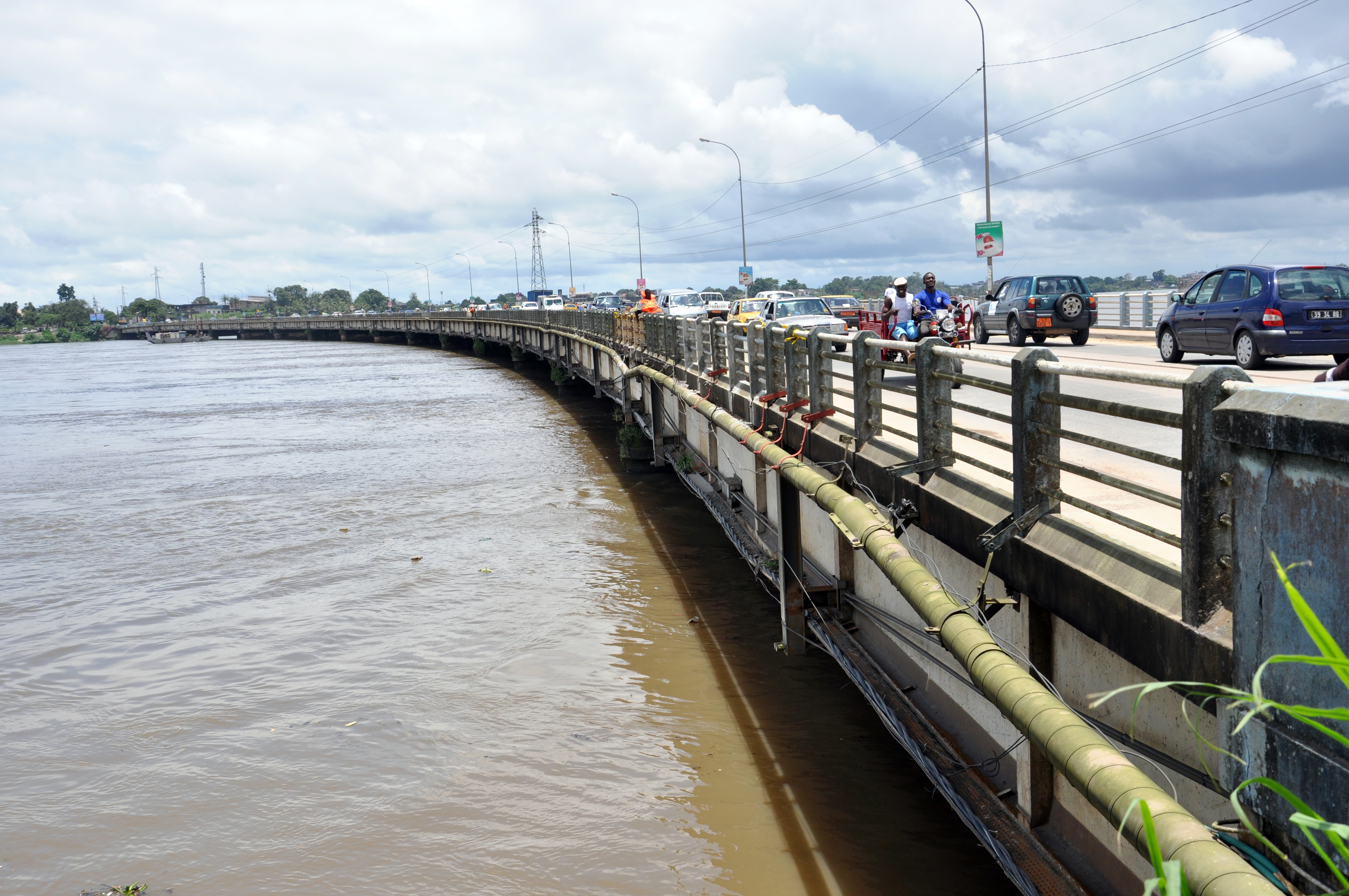
Wouri bridge

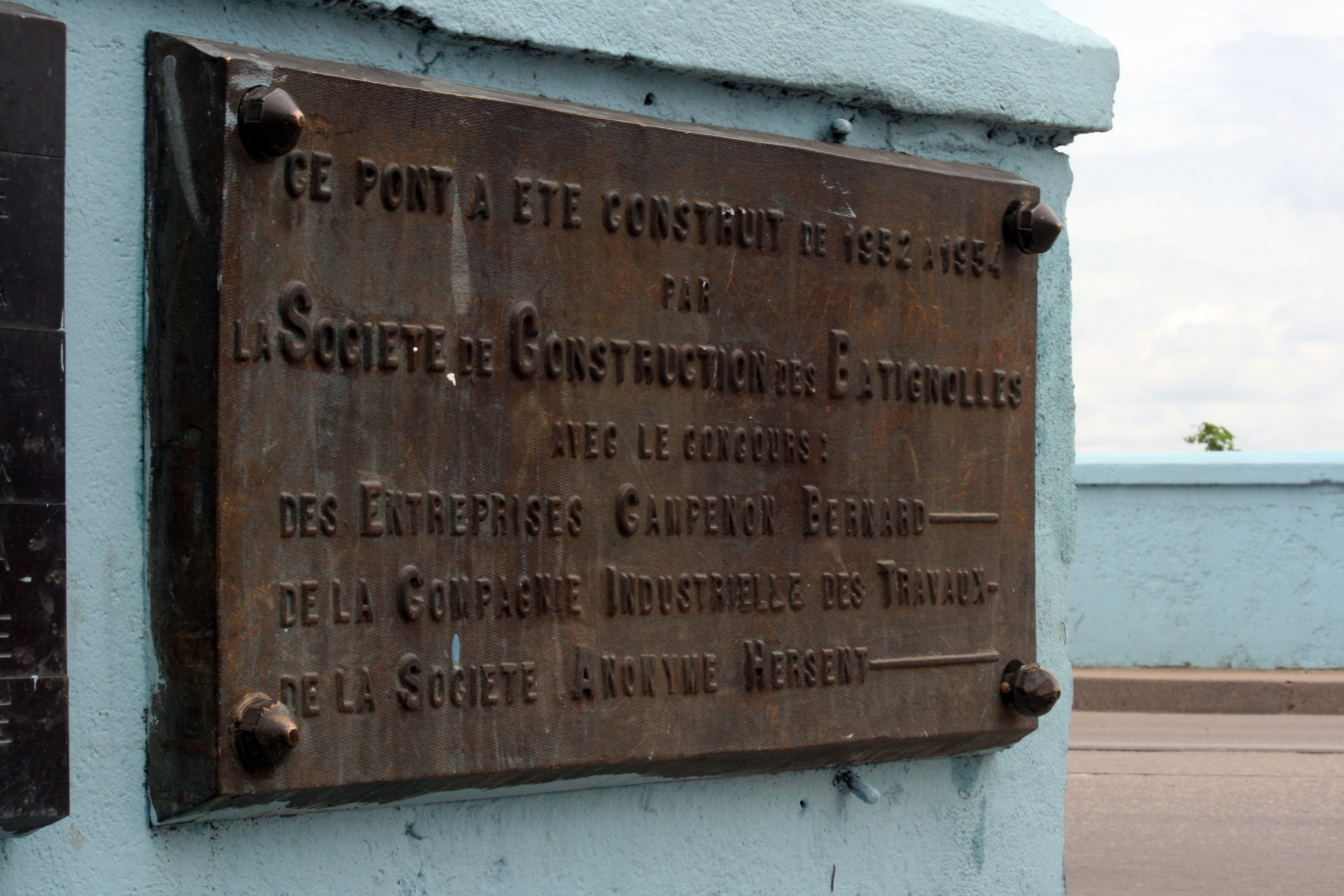
Inauguration plaque

In the 1950s, during the colonial period, the French built a bridge of 1 km across the river, the longest in the central African sub-region. It connects Douala with the city of Bonabéri and is not only of great economic importance to western Cameroon, carrying auto, truck, and train traffic but also a central tool for international exchanges with landlocked countries like Chad and the Central African Republic. Since 2004 the bridge has been undergoing a major rehabilitation. With an initial capacity of 2,000 vehicles per day, this bridge now supports more than 45,000 vehicles everyday creating monstrous traffic at the entrance of Douala's heart.

=== Second bridge ===
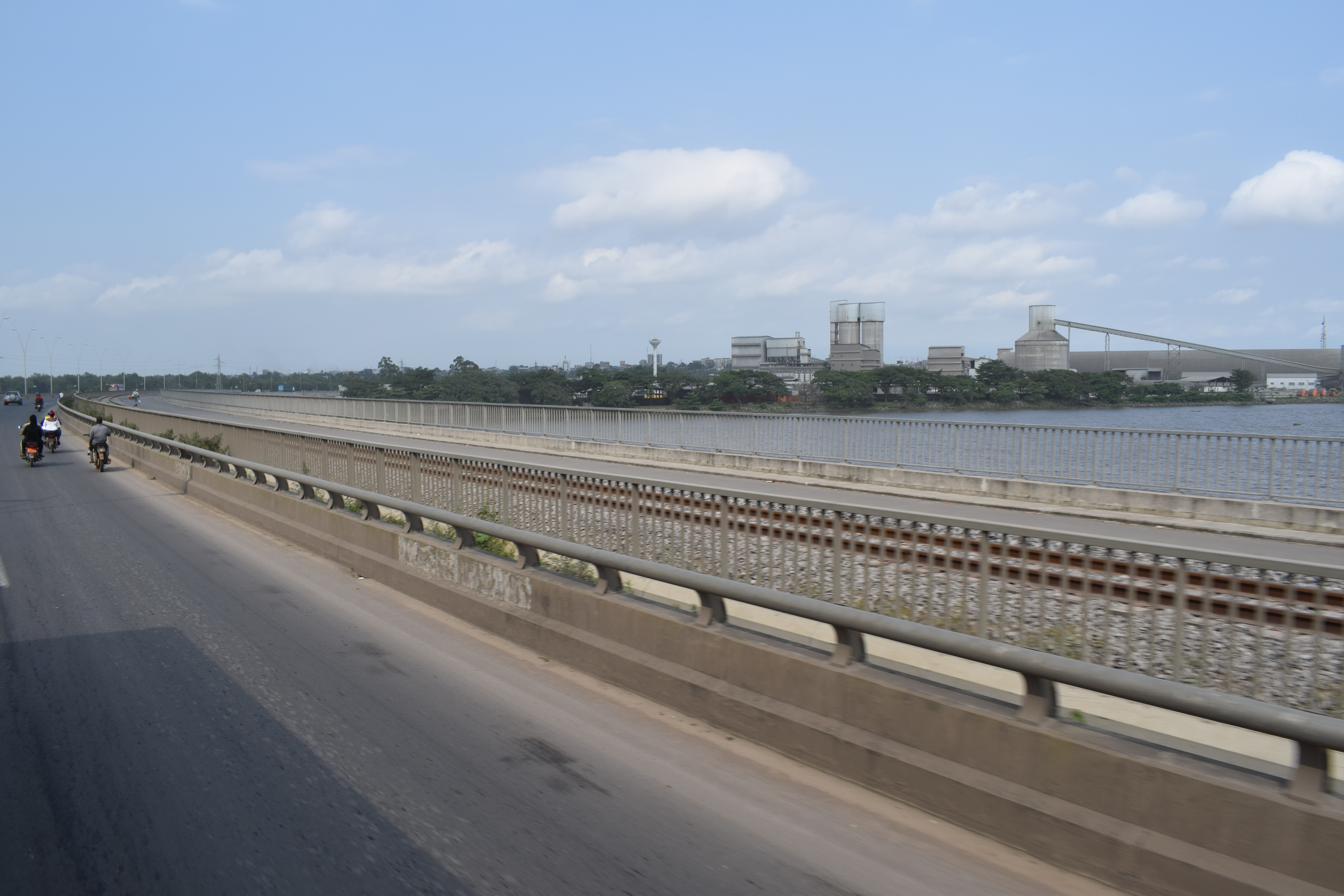
The second (newly constructed) bridge over the Wouri River

With a cost of almost CFA 141.6 billion, the second bridge on the Wouri river is 756 m (2,480 ft) long and 34 m (112 ft) wide and has a 746 m-long (2,448 ft) railway. Constructed by the multinational road construction company SOGEA SATOM and financed by the Cameroonian government and a loan from the French government, this bridge will help decongest traffic on the first bridge. The construction of this bridge is important for Cameroon's economy and will facilitate exchanges in the central African region which opens to the world through Cameroon and its proximity to the Atlantic Ocean. The bridge is meant to be commissioned before the end of 2018.

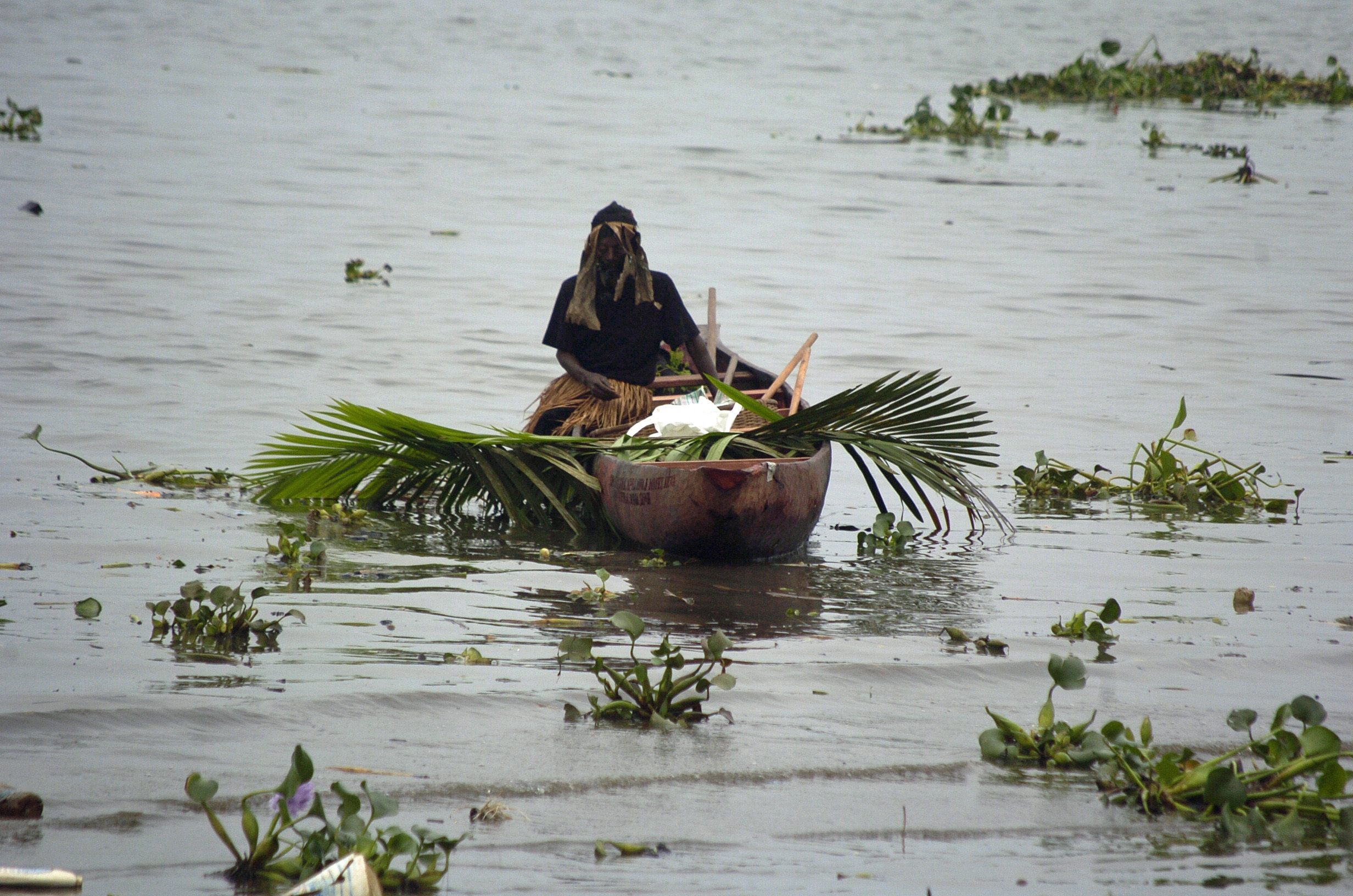
Messenger of Ngondo on the Wouri

River Wouri Banks

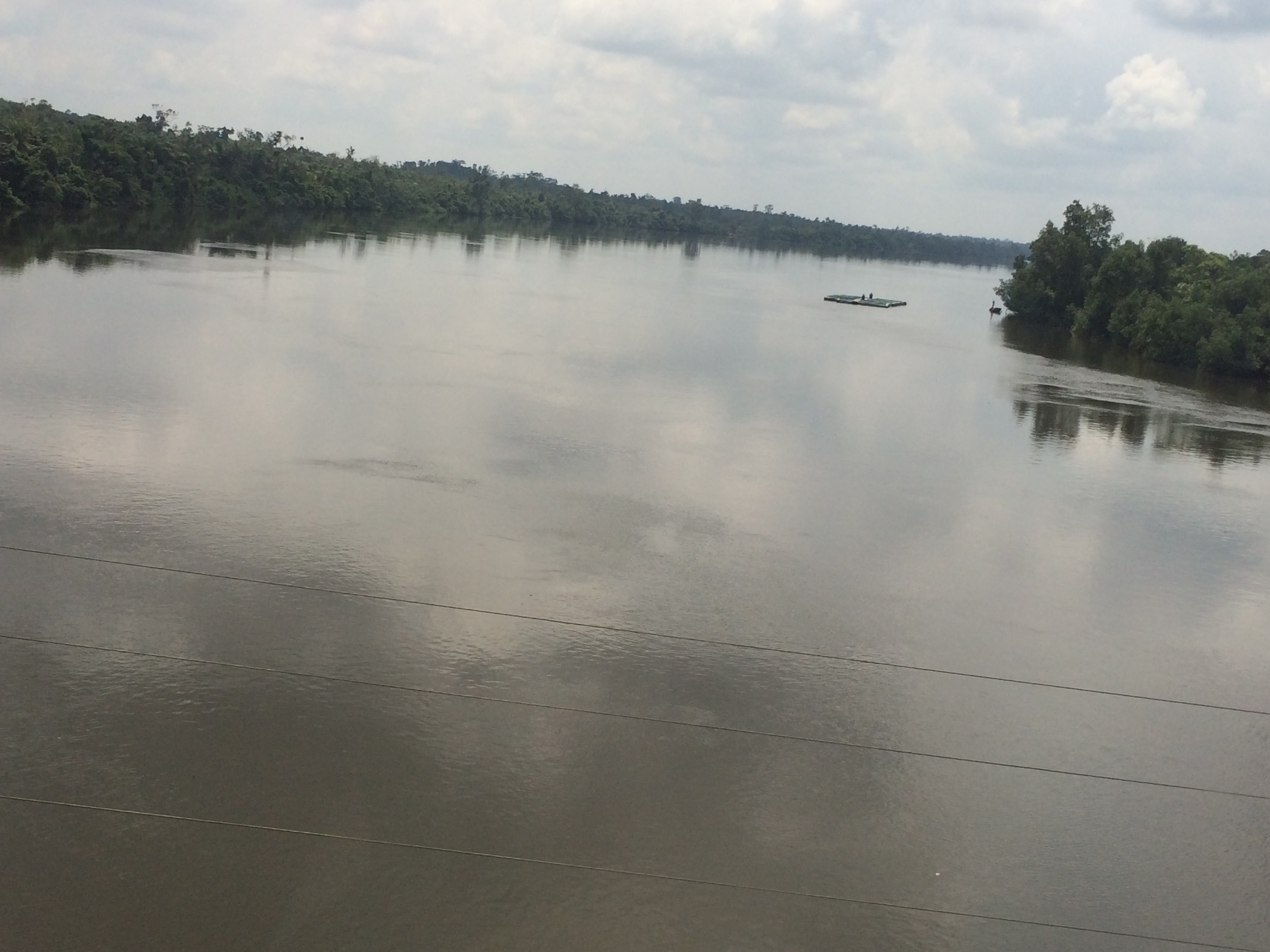
Bonaberi from the Wouri River

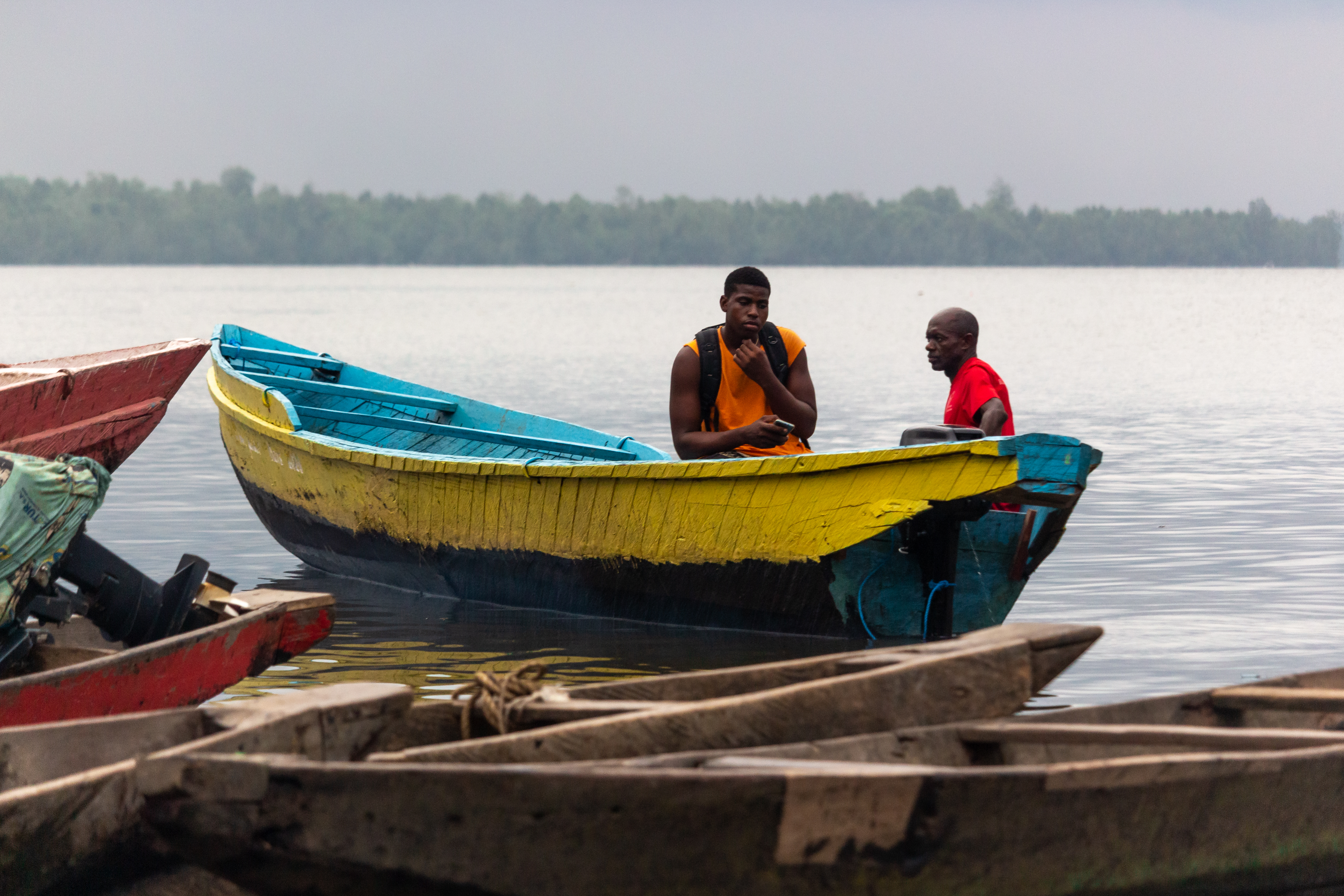
Boats on Wouri (2020)

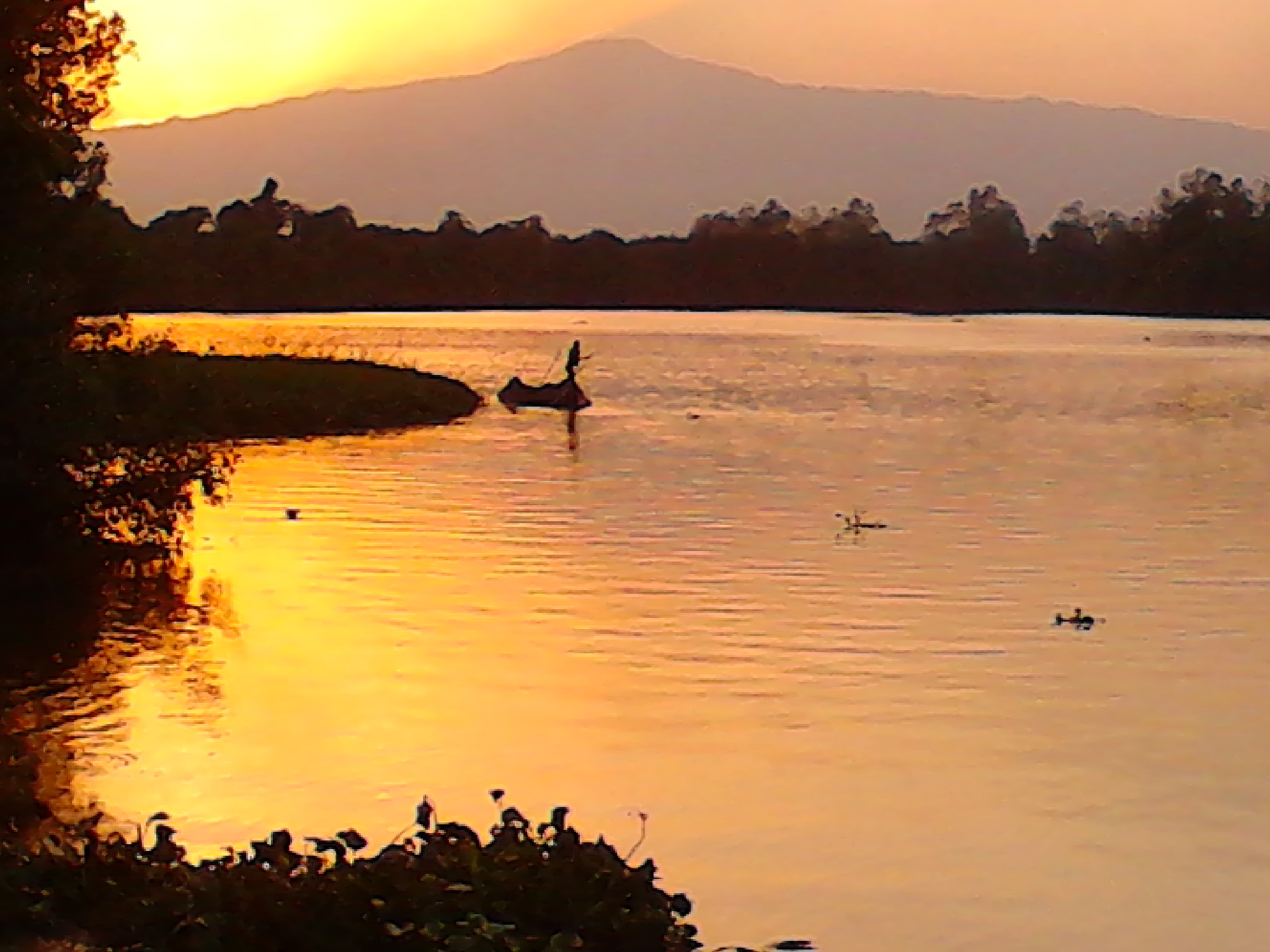
Couché du soleil at Bonendale (2013)

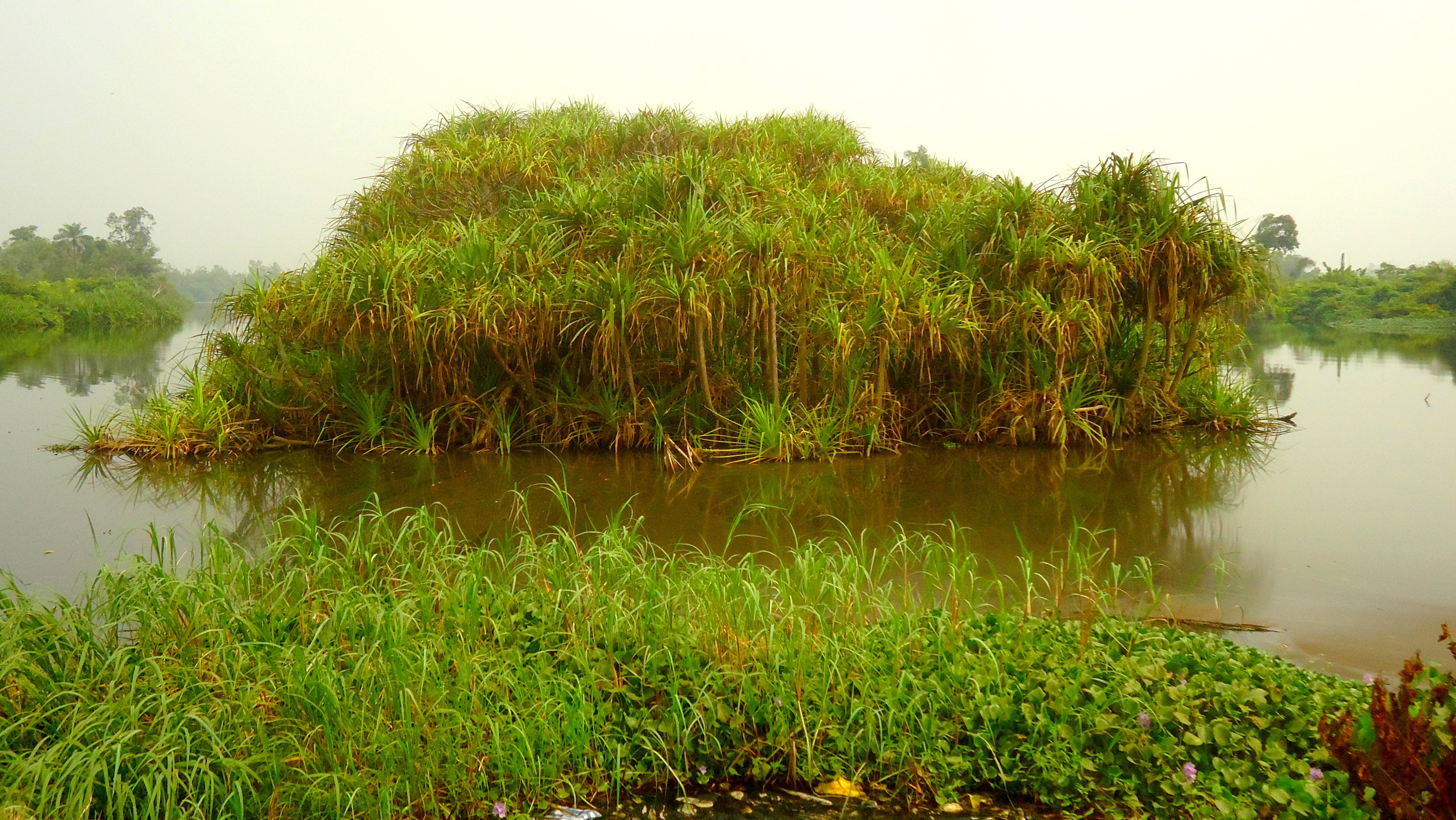
Bonaberi mangrove swamp

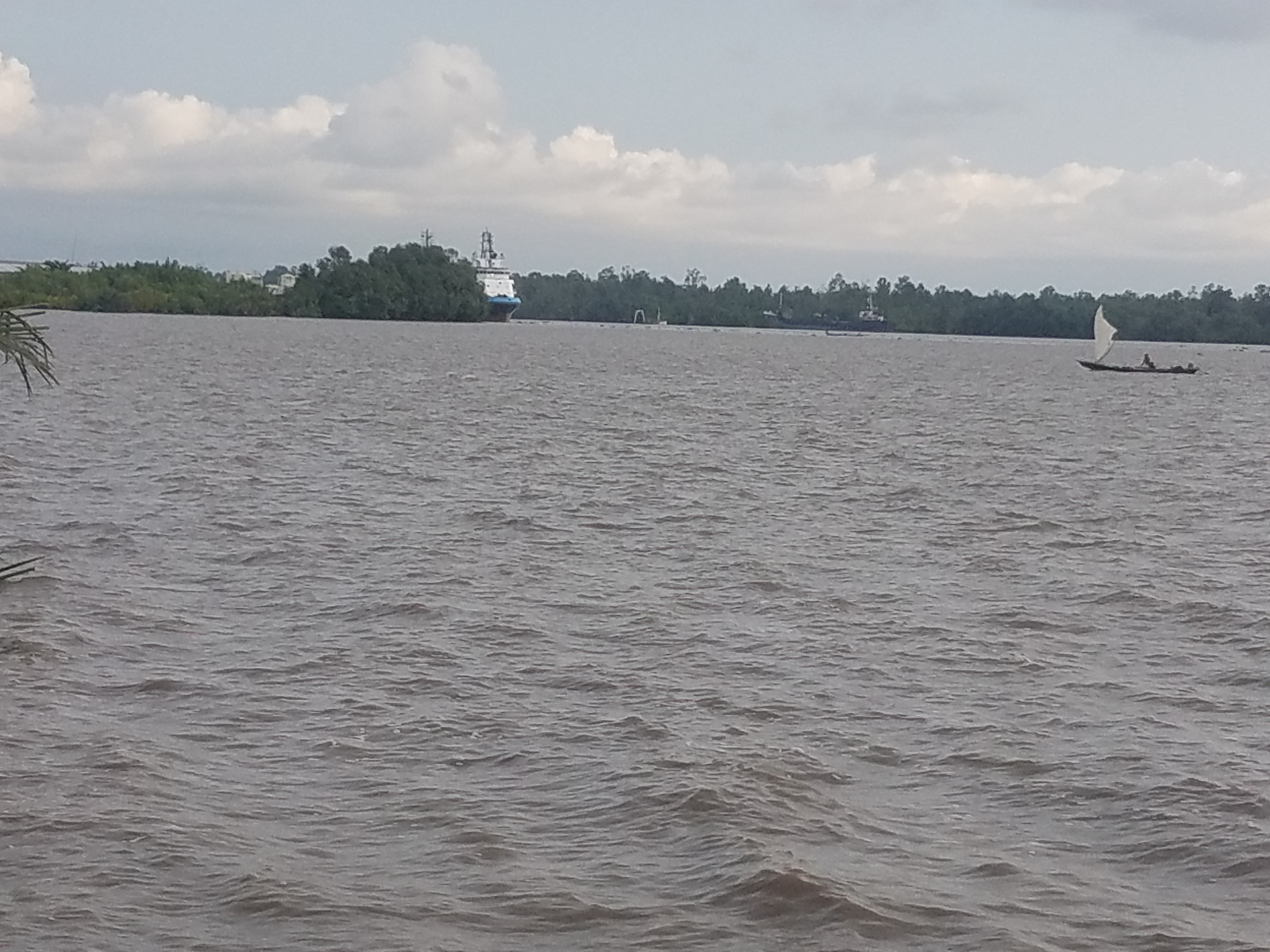

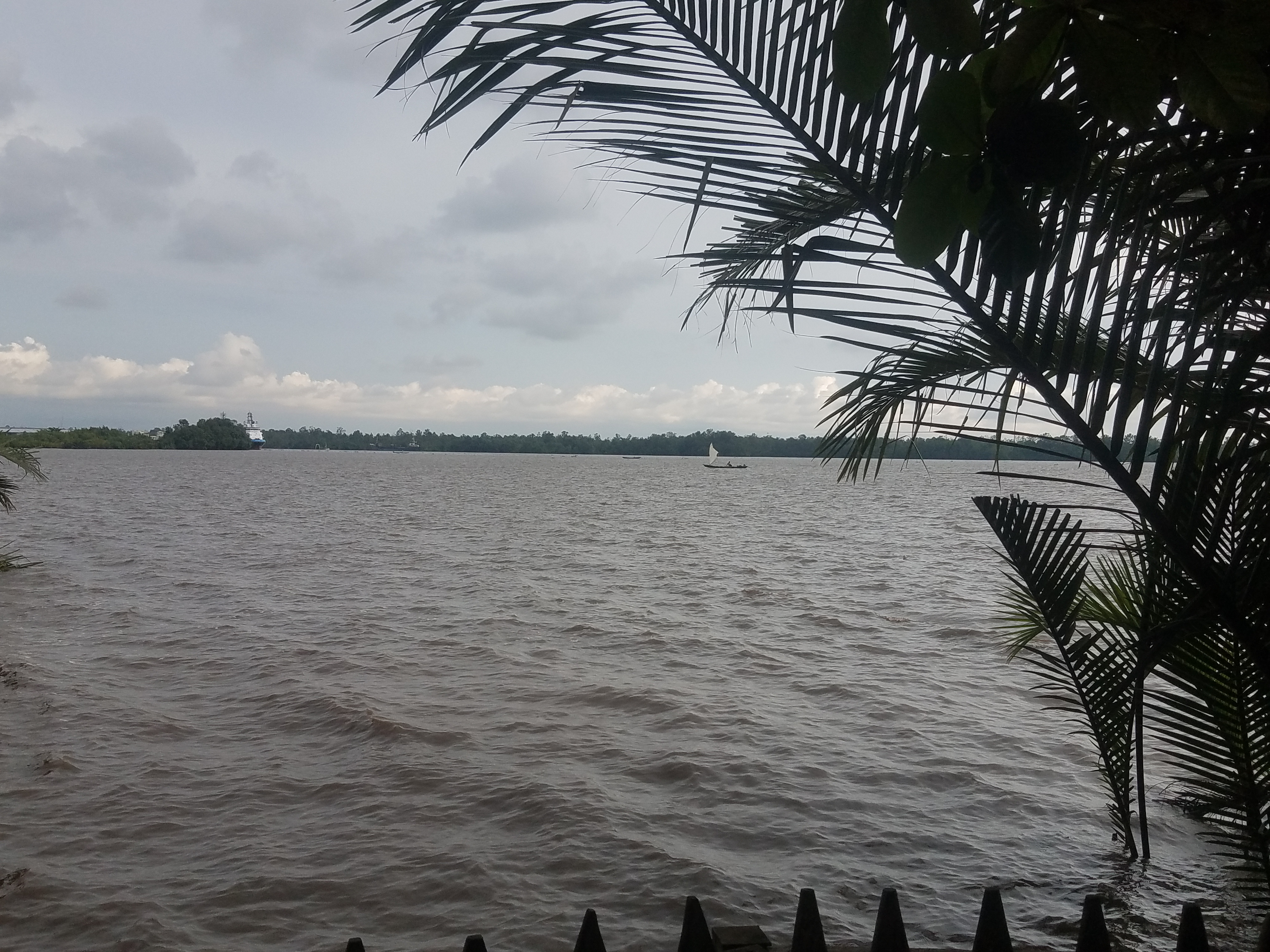

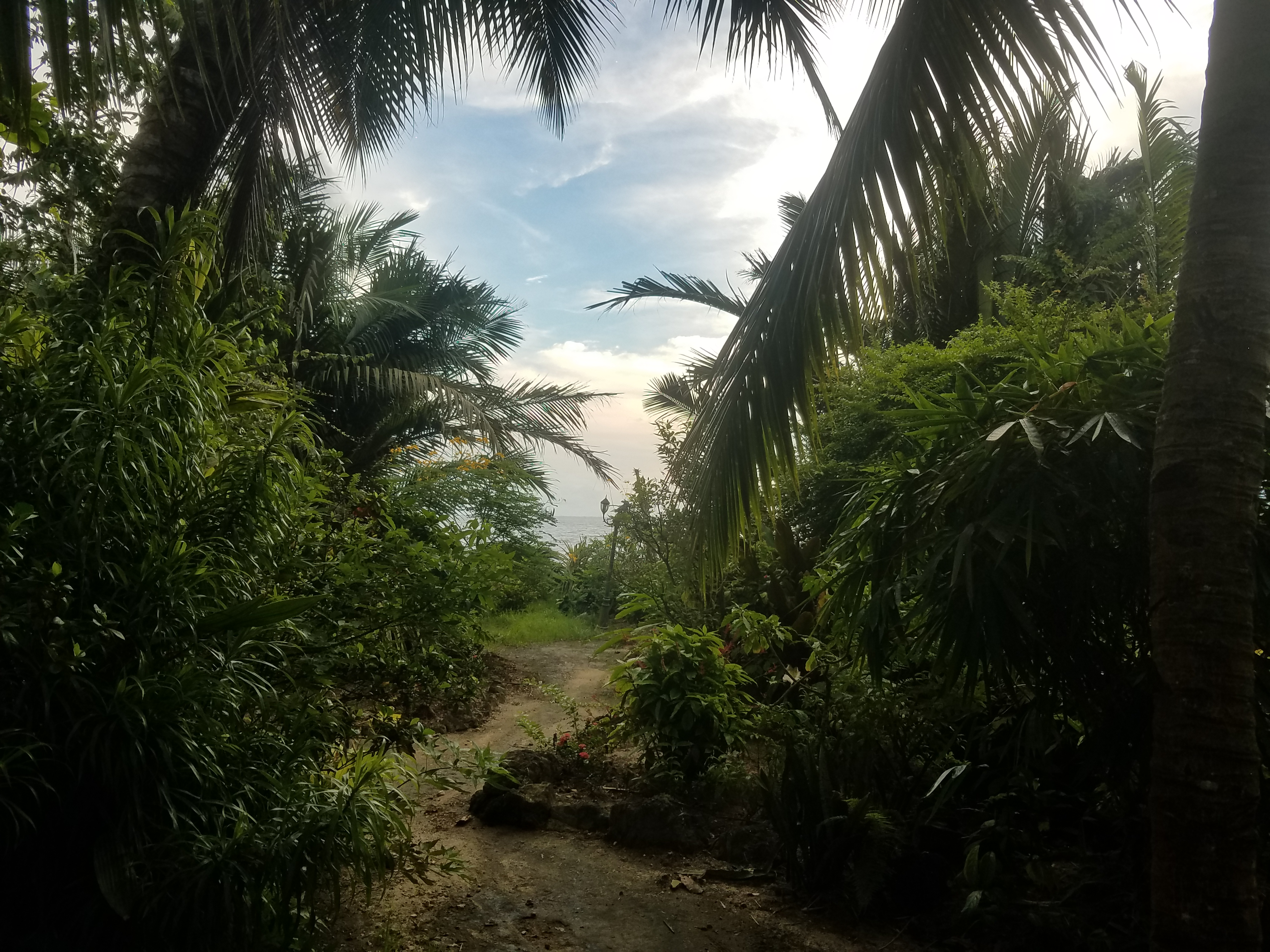

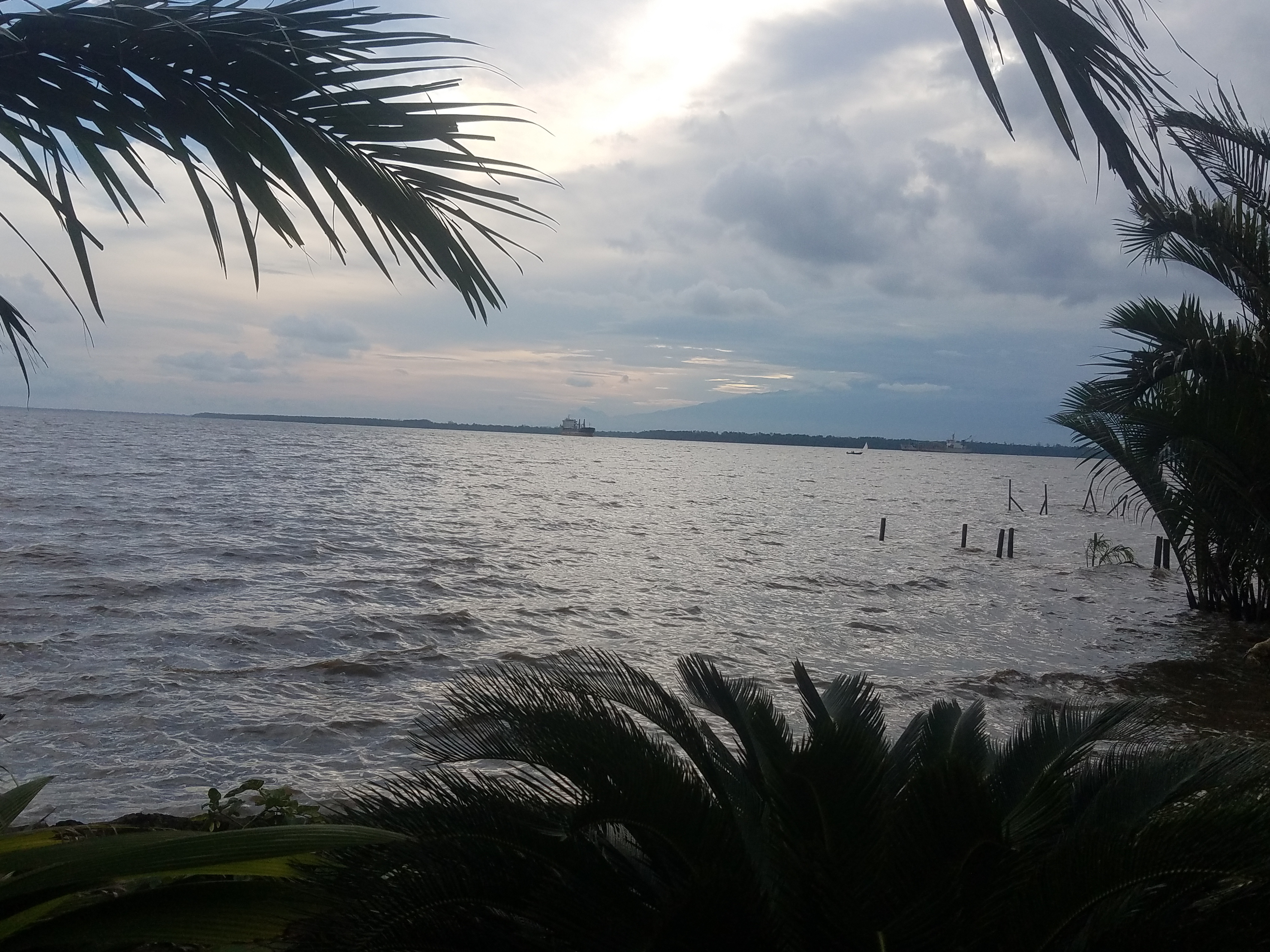

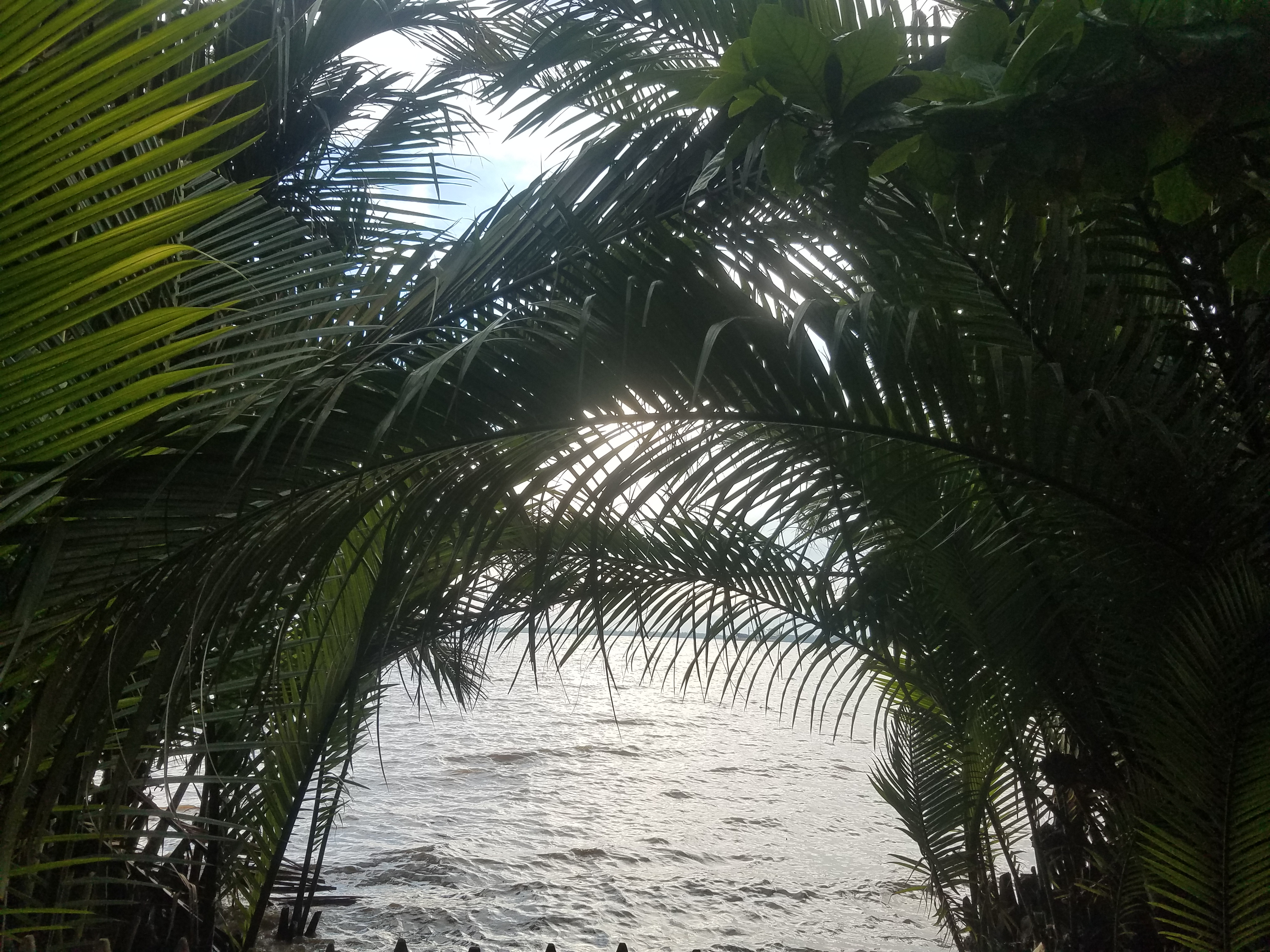

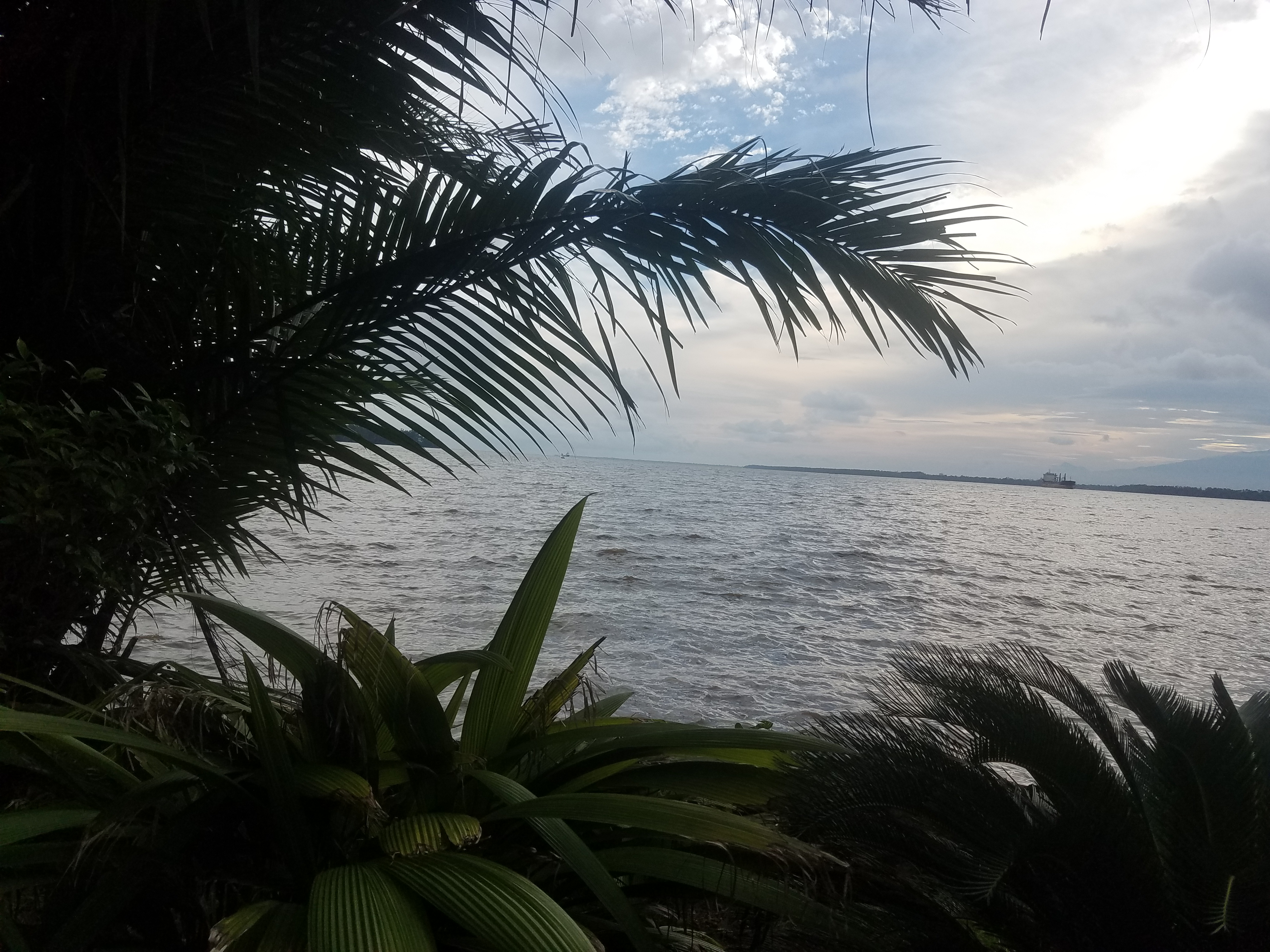

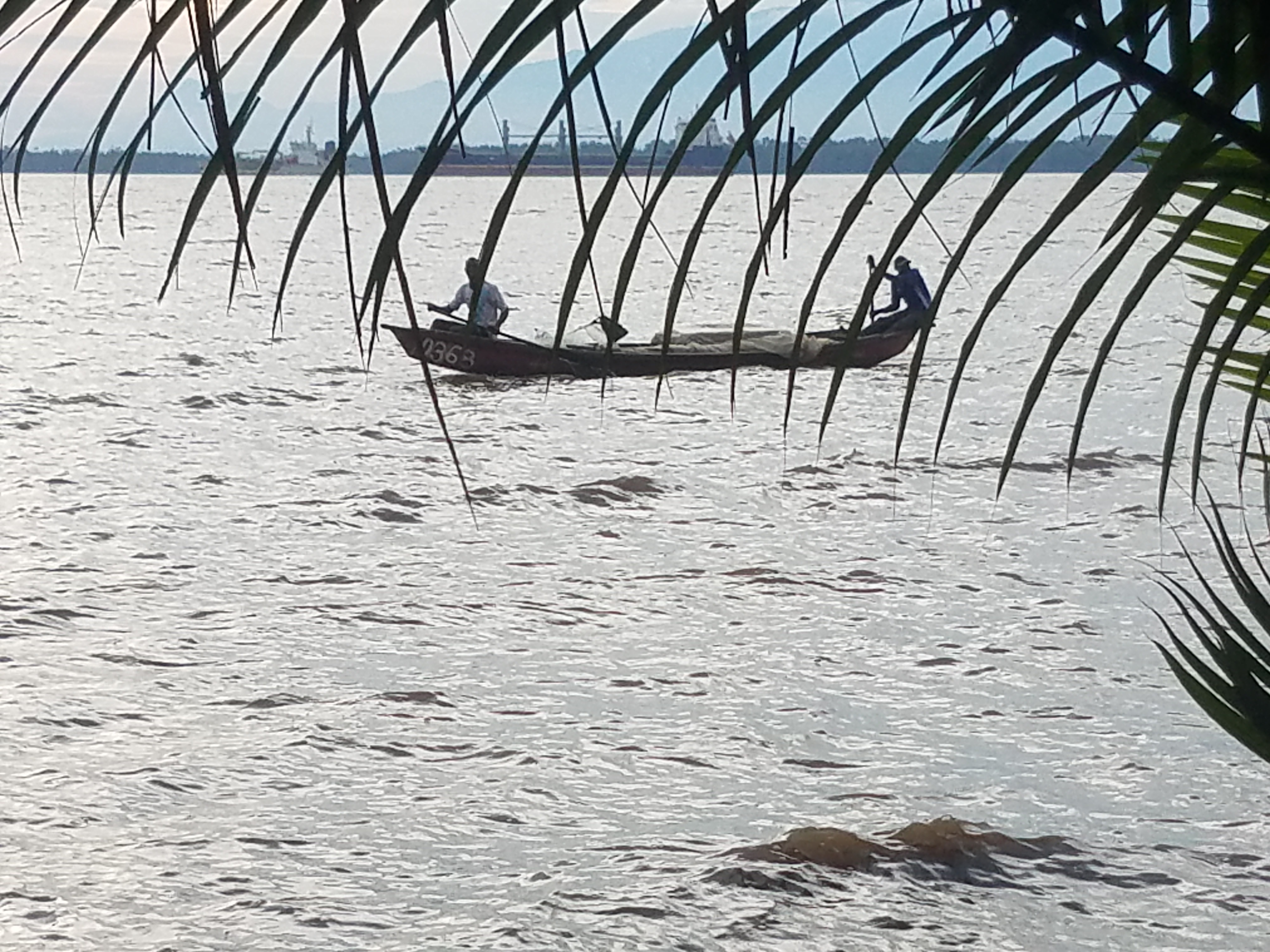

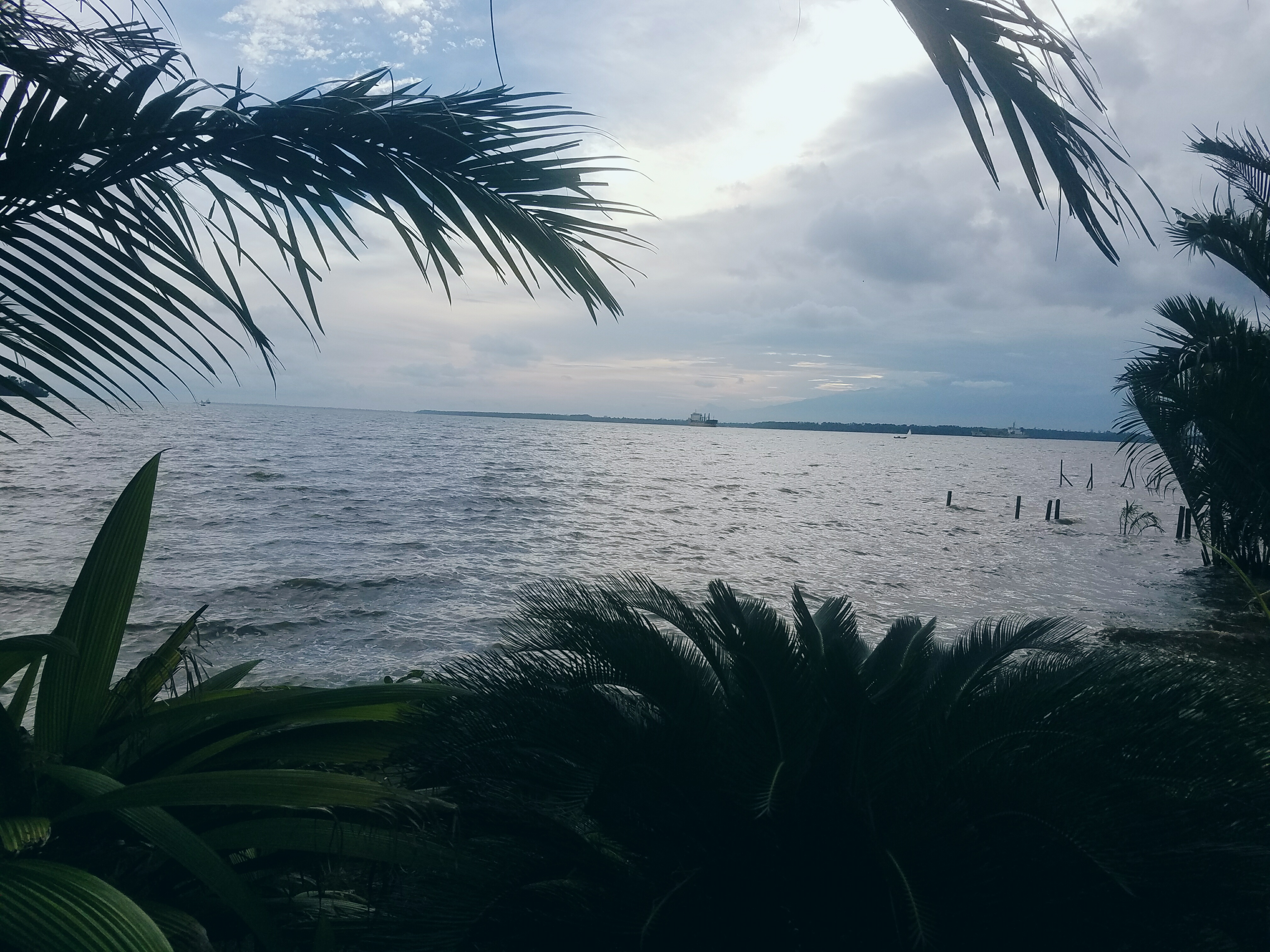
Wouri Bridge

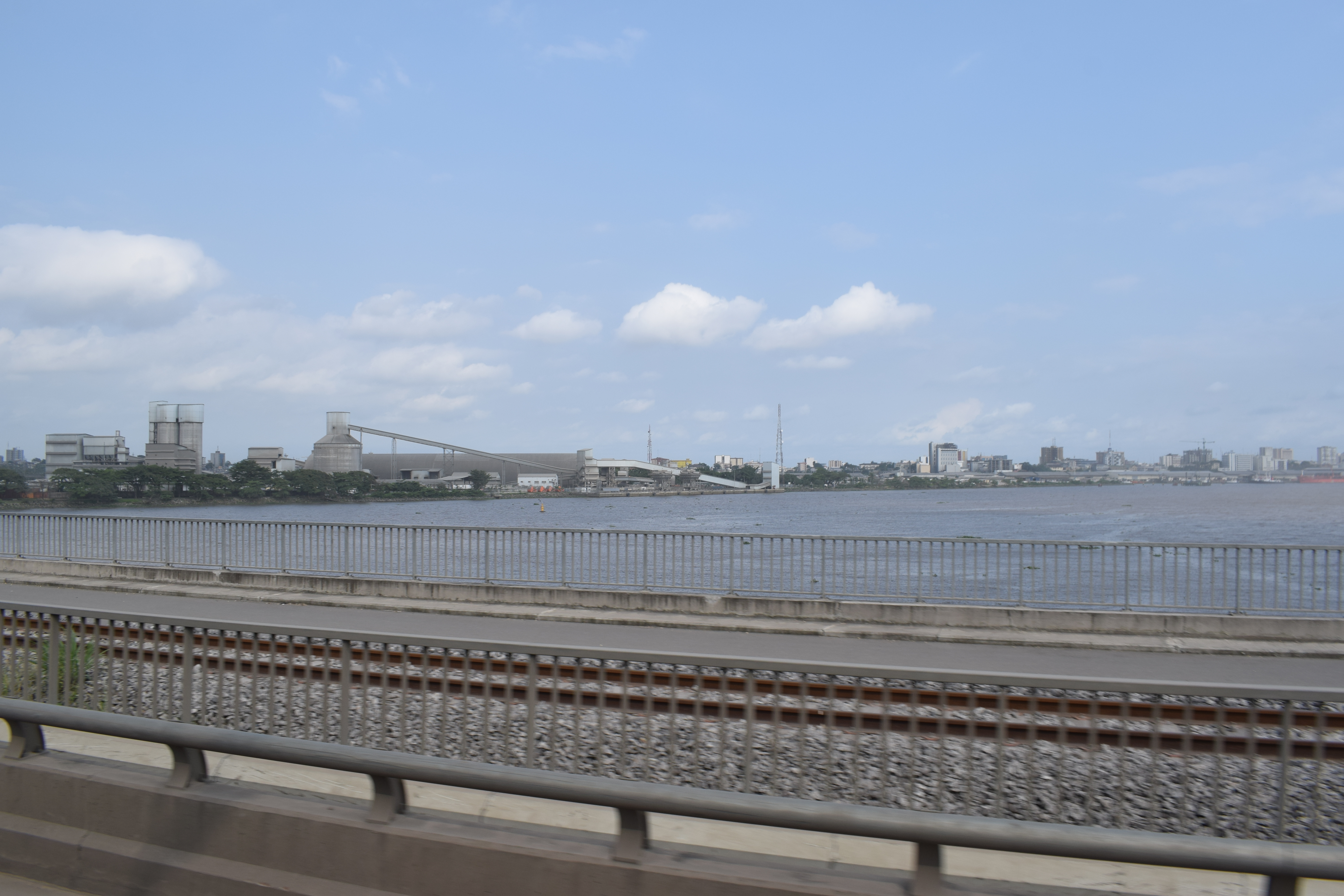

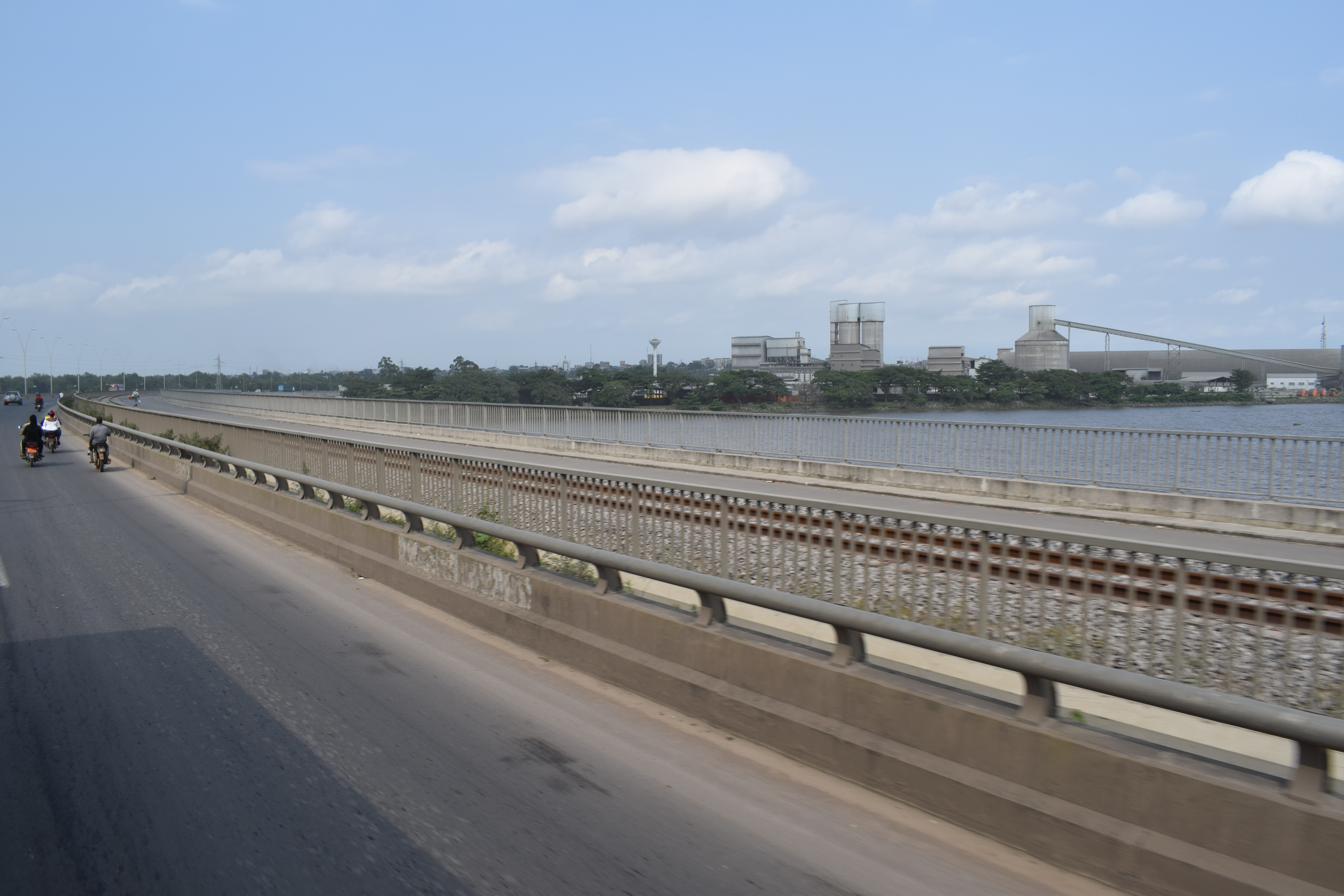

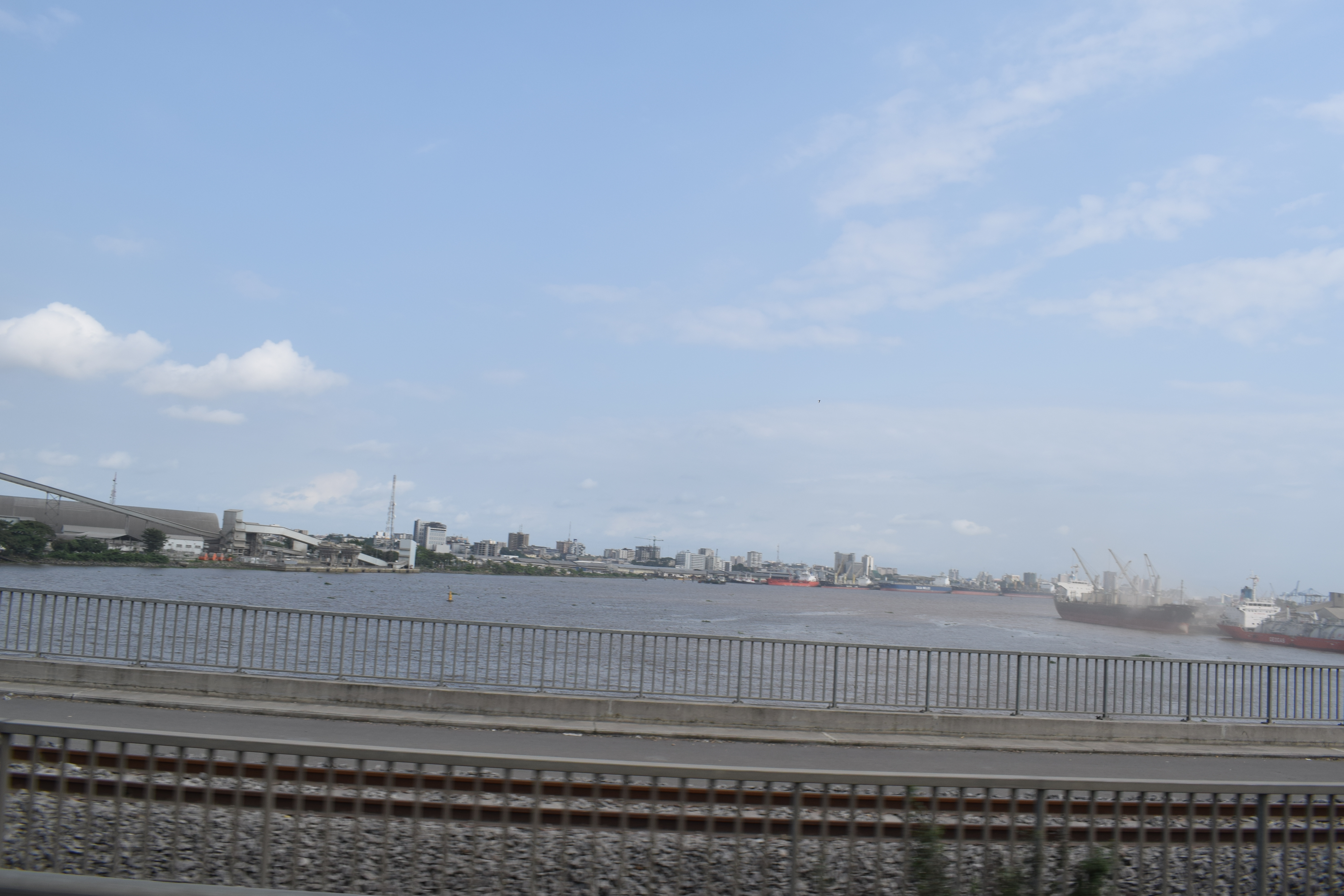

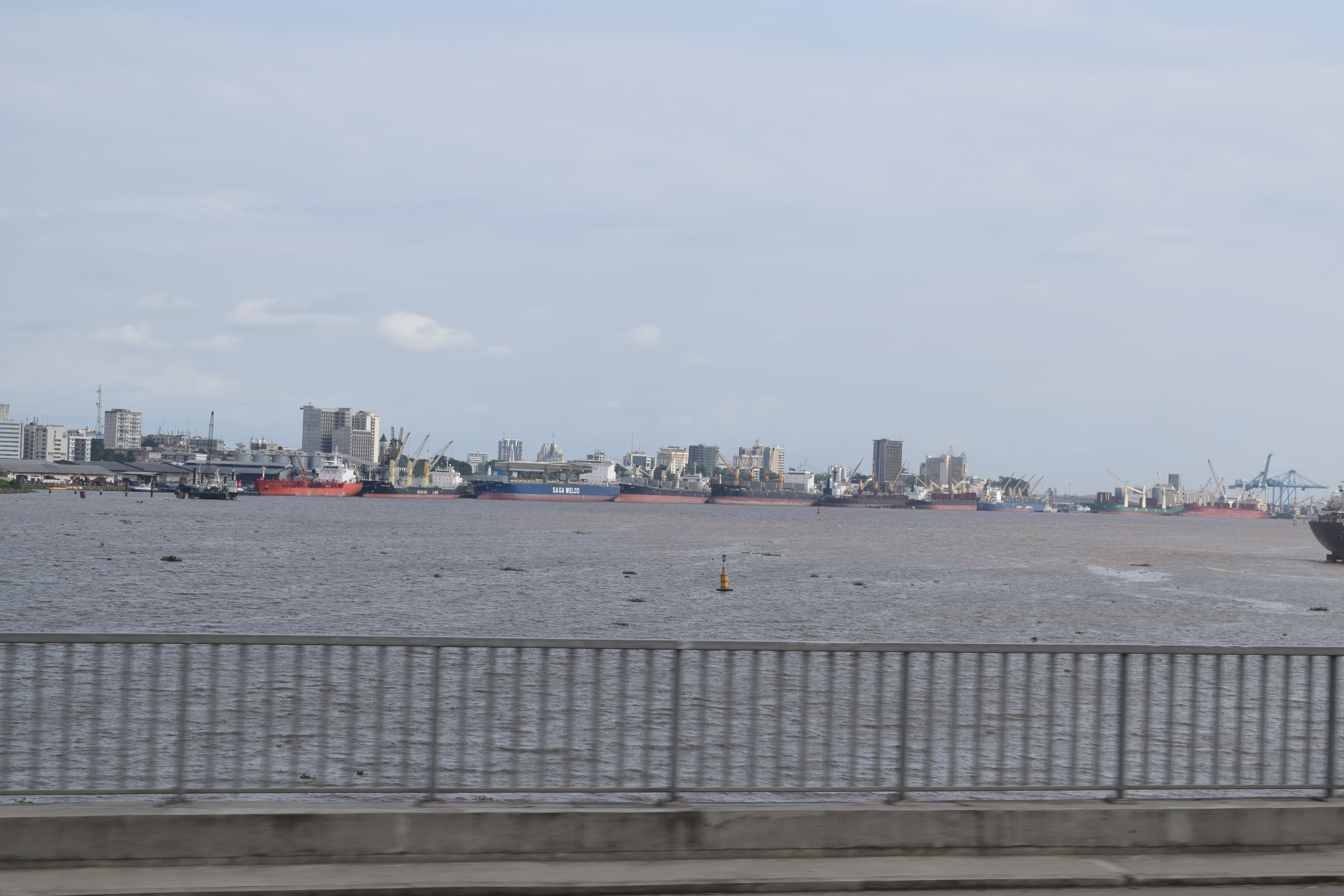
Activities done at the Wouri River

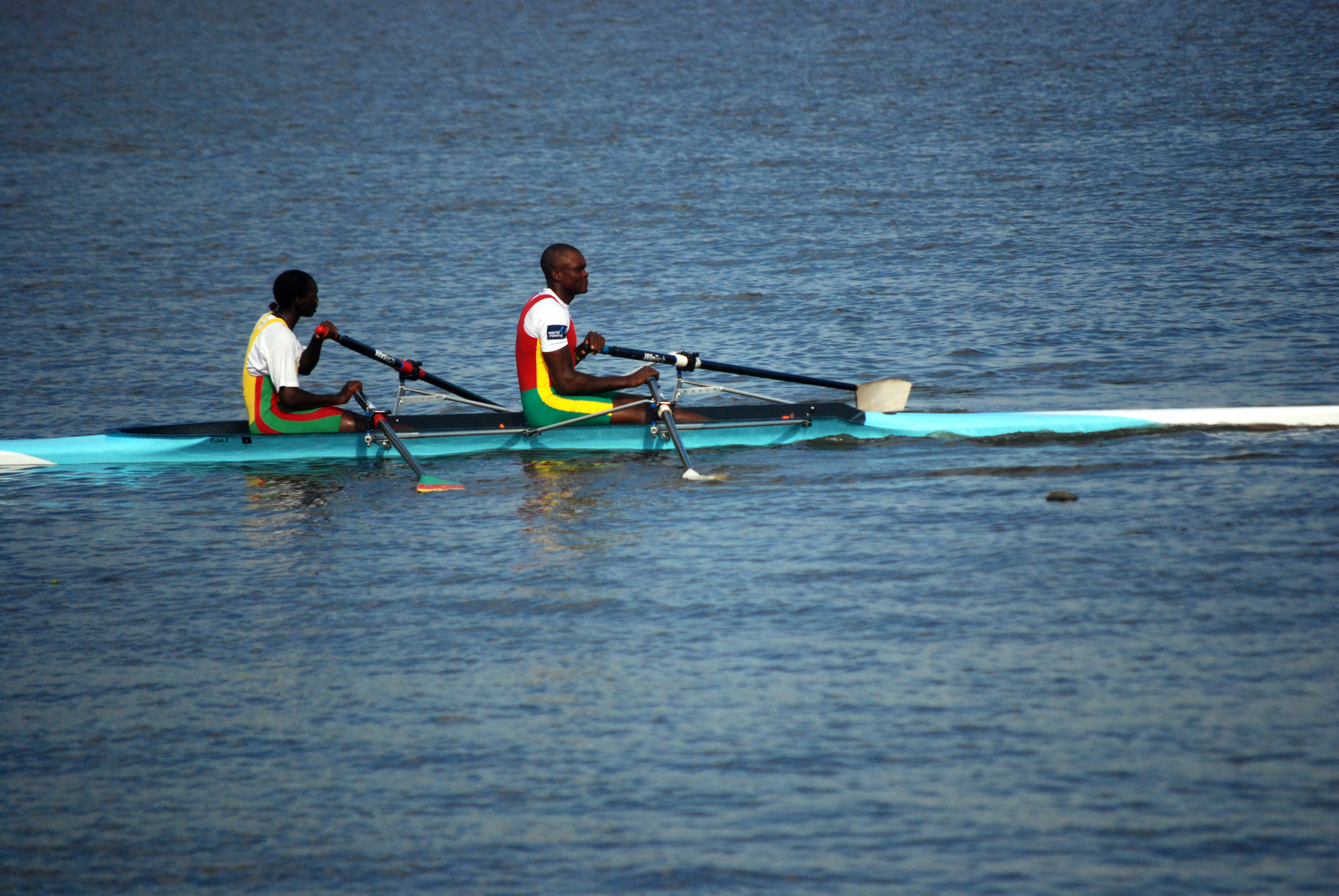
Kayak competition

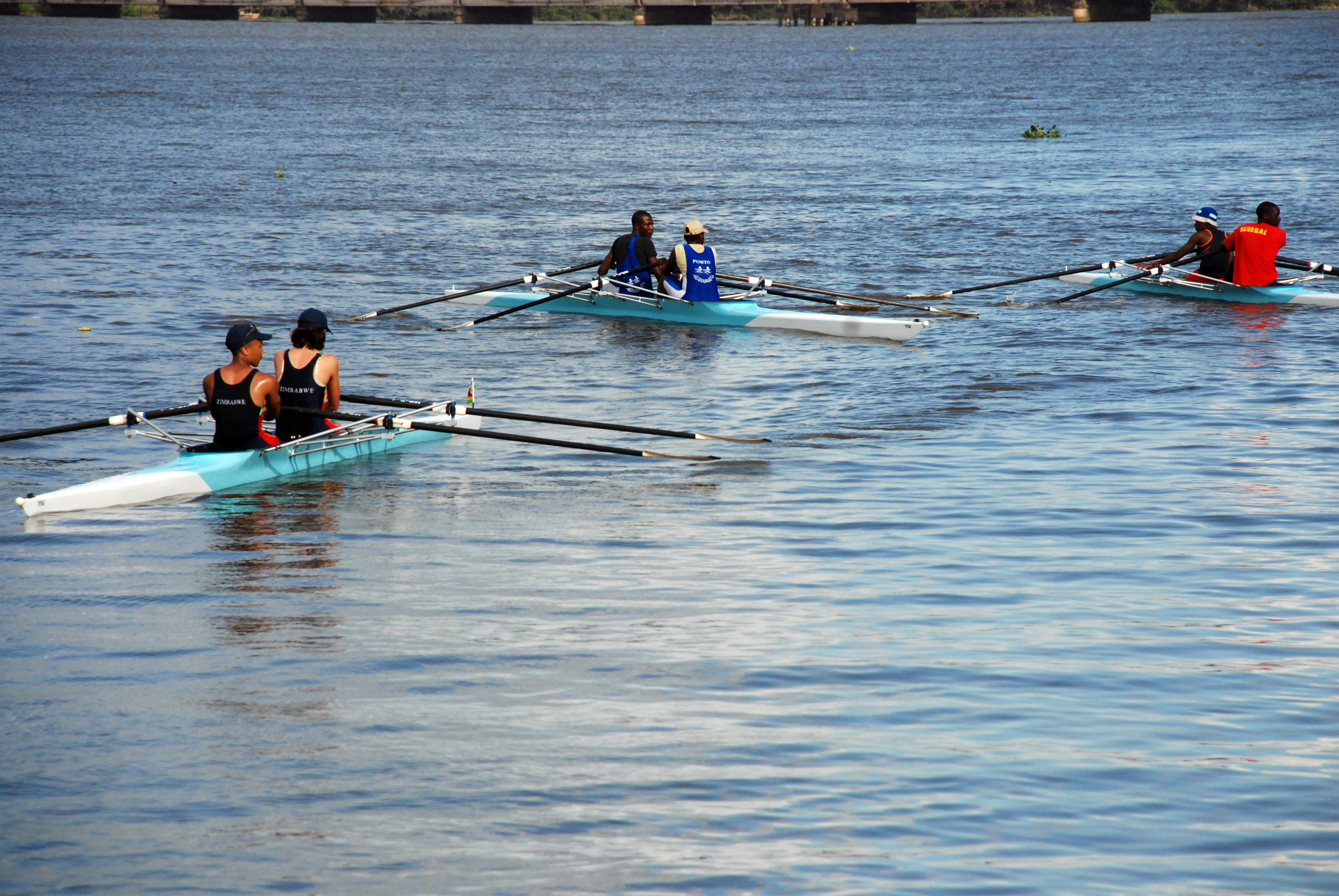

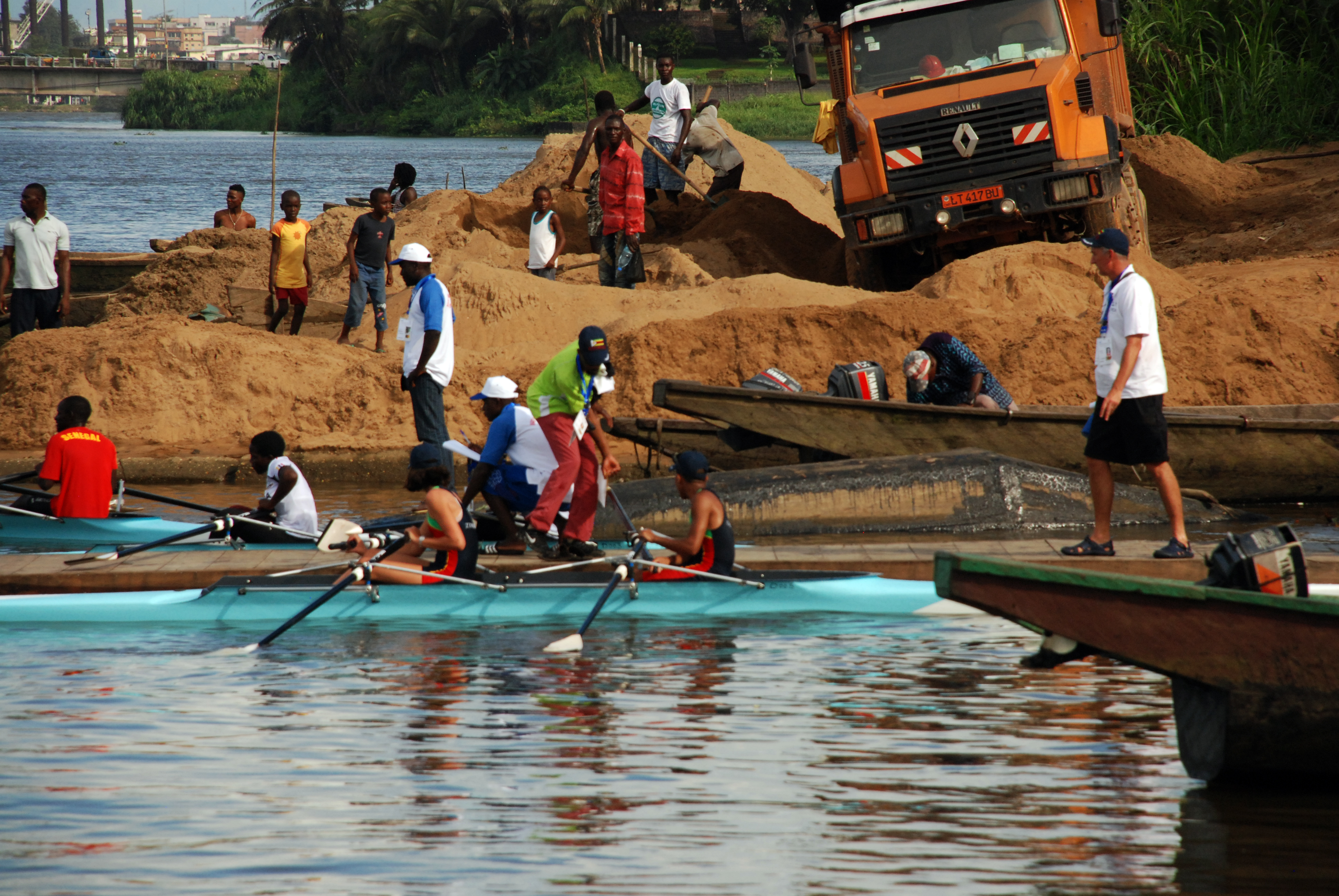

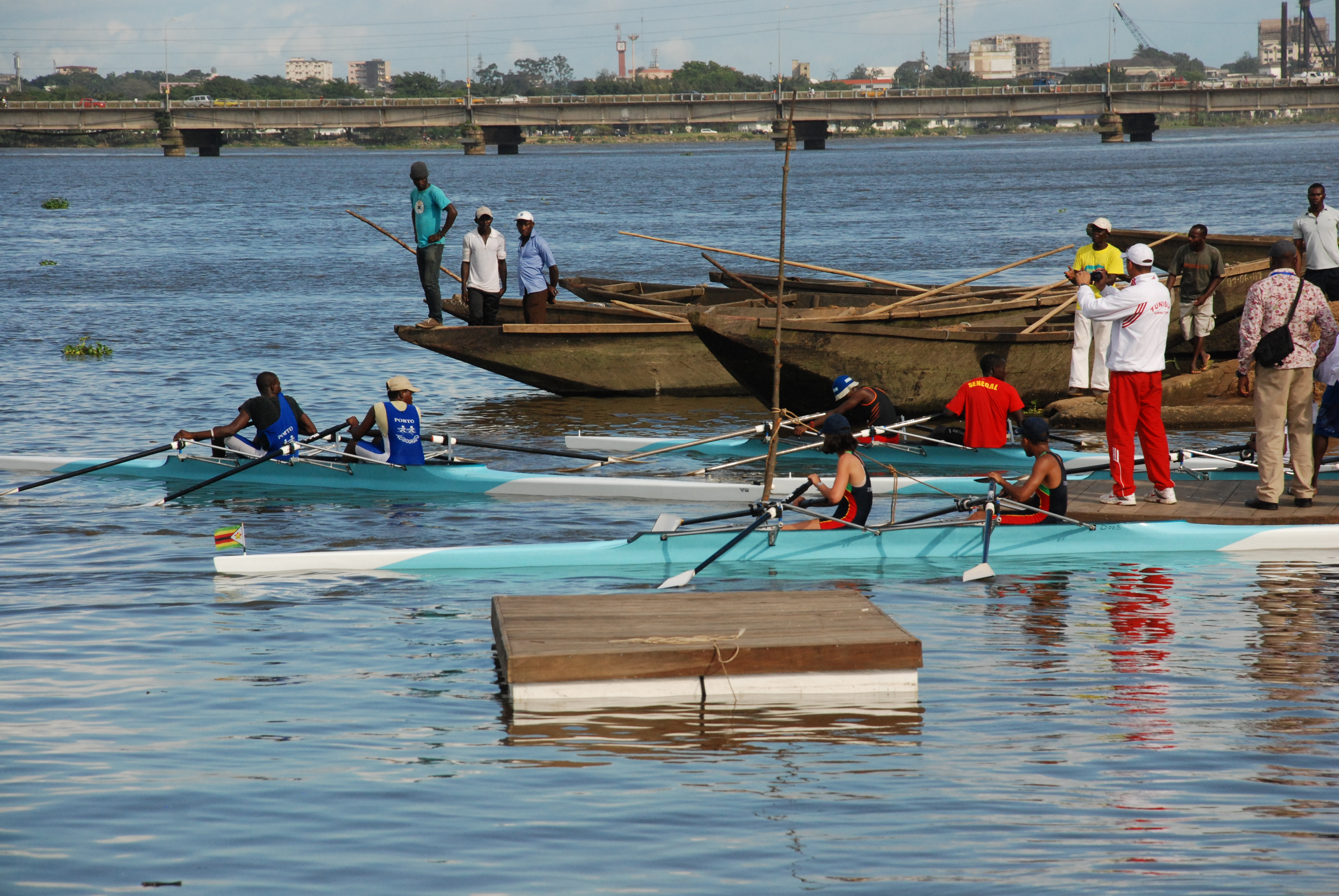

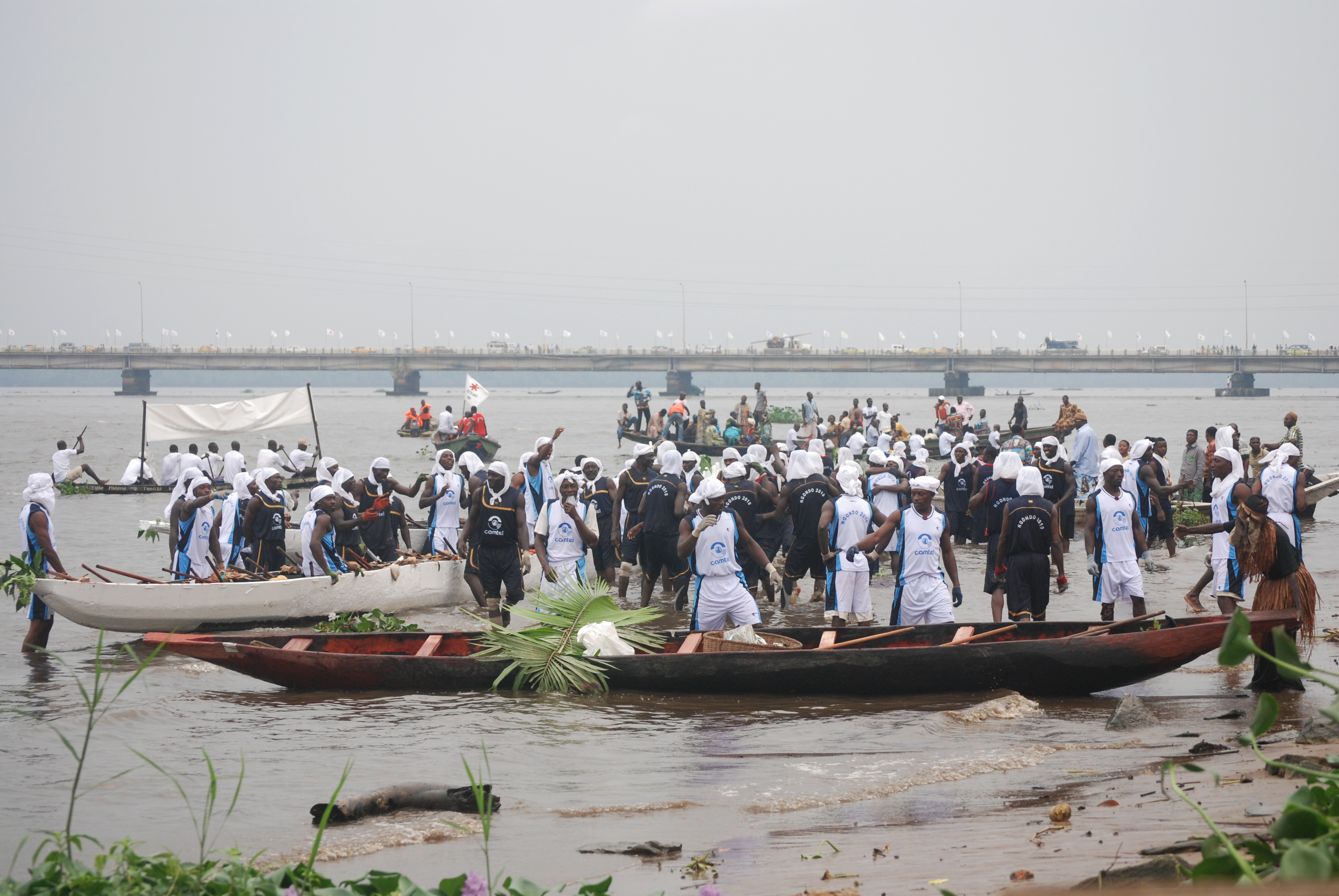
Canoe Race during Ngondo Festival

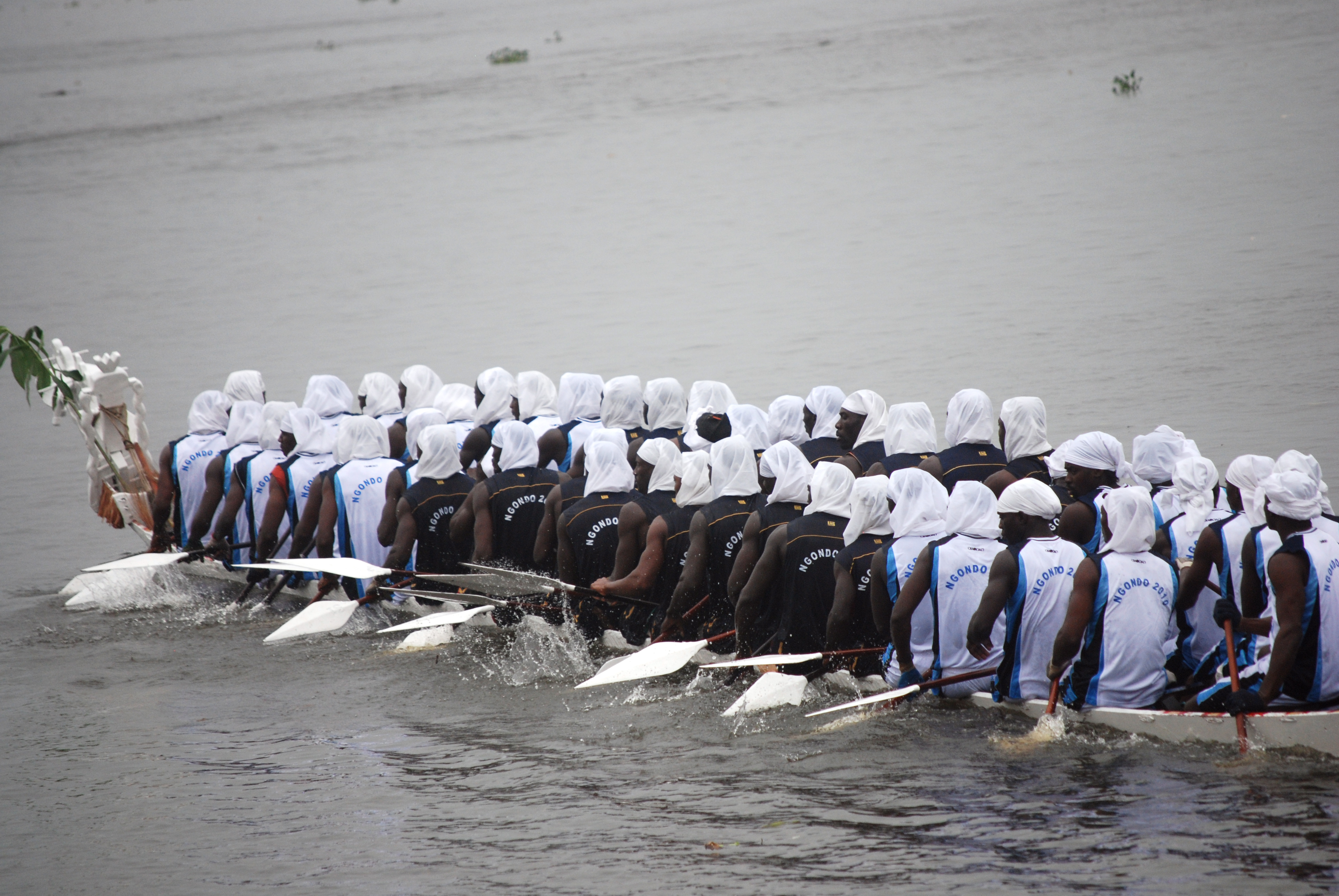

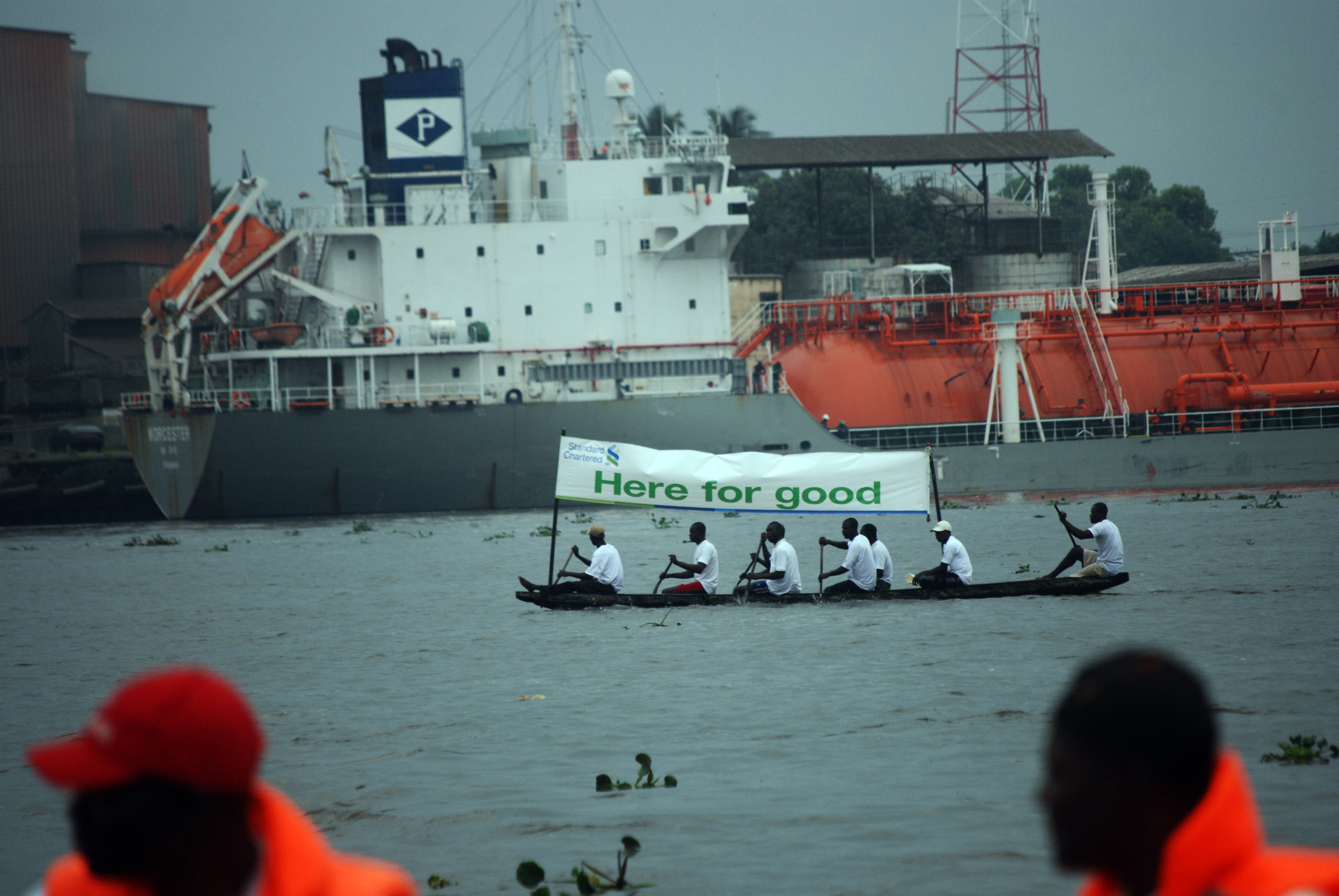

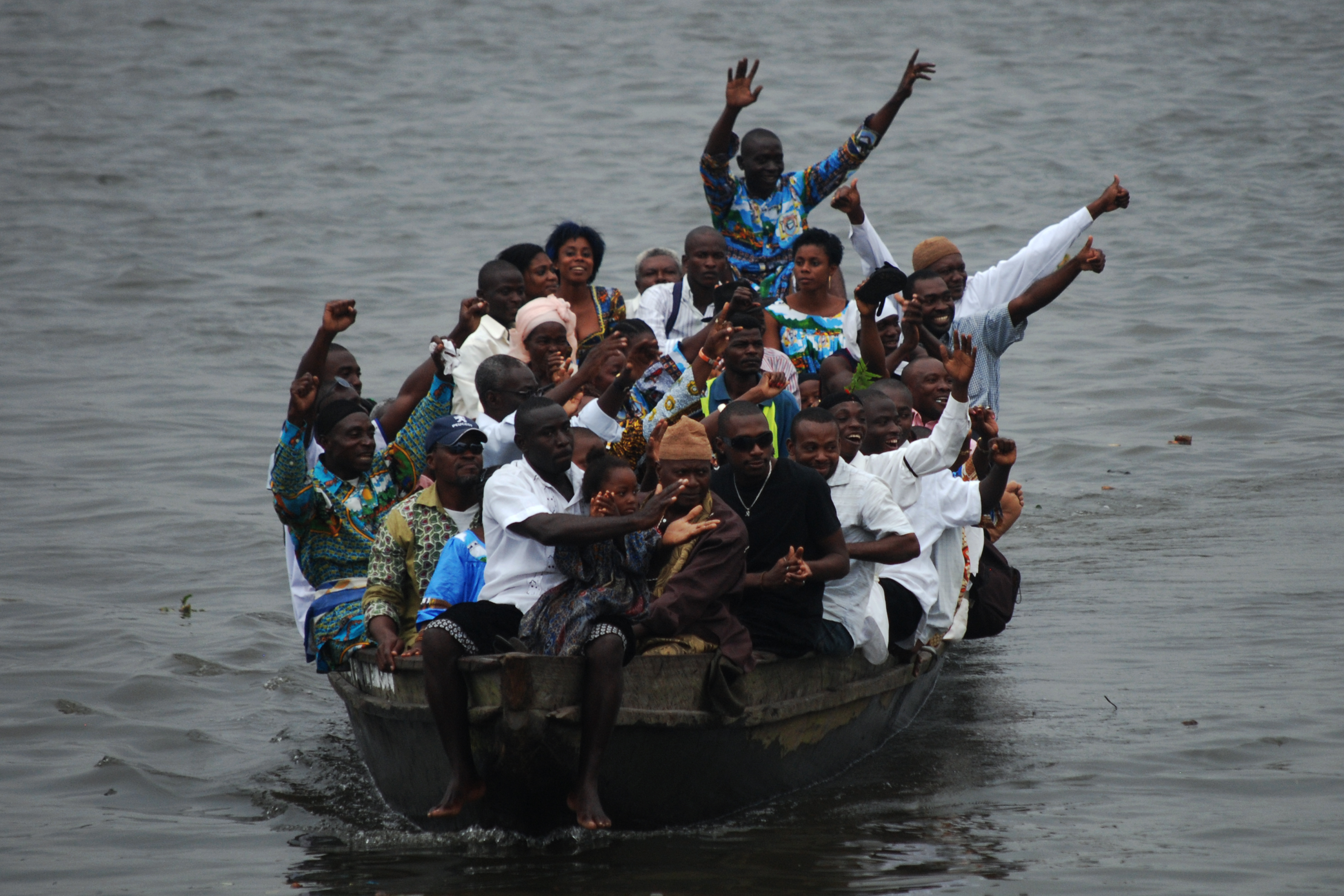

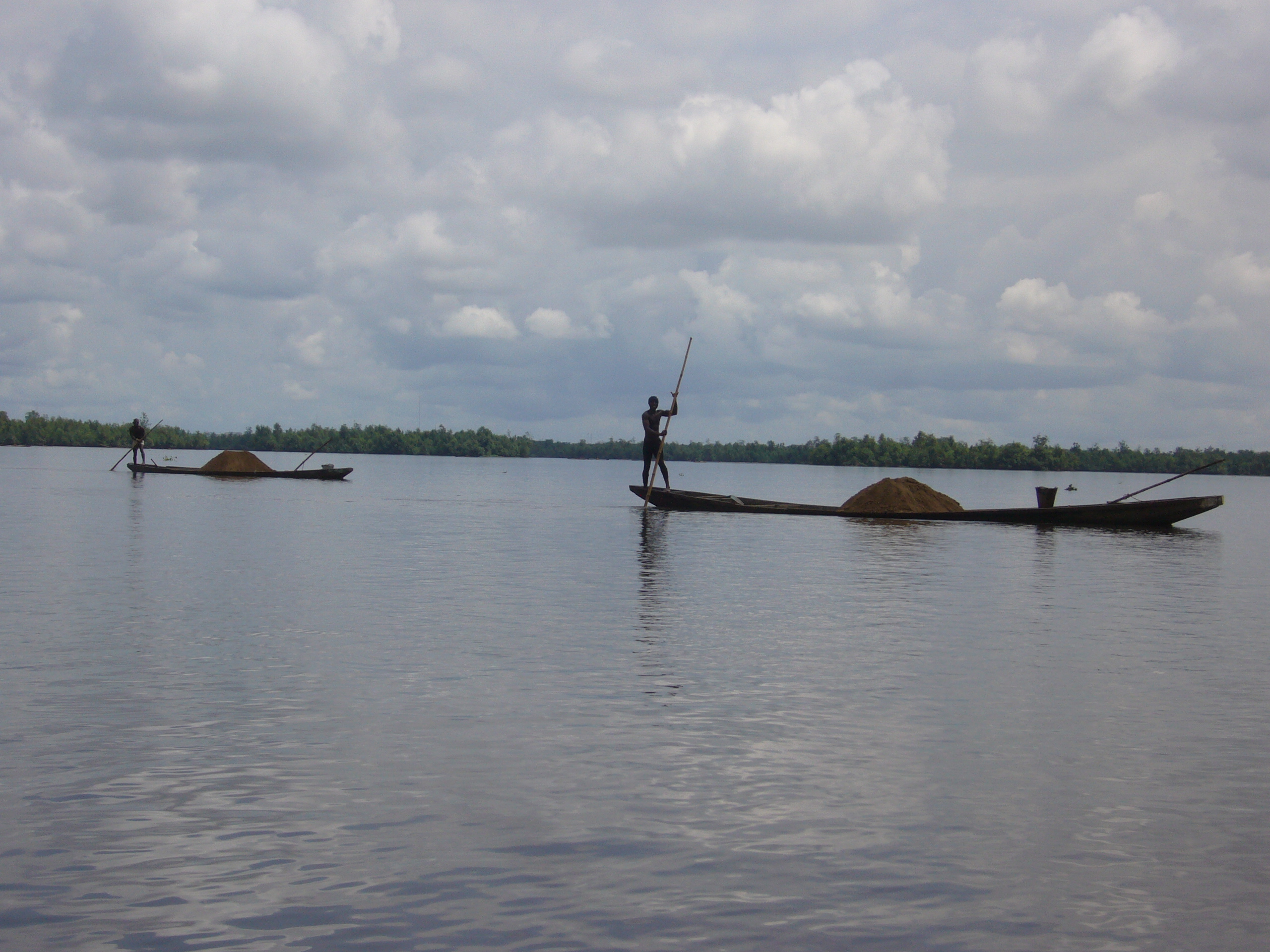
Sand extraction in the Wouri River

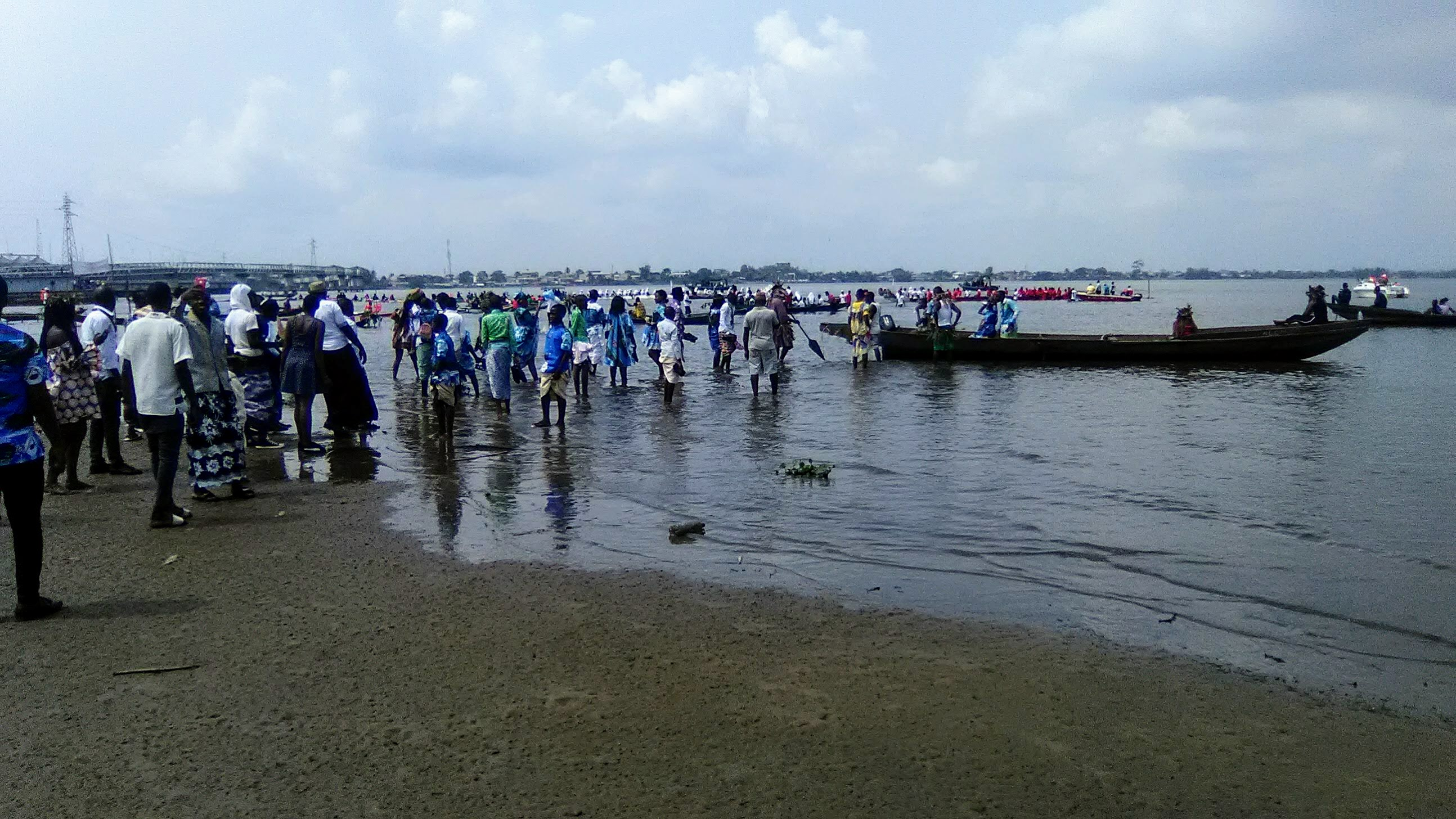
A view of how the Wouri banks looks like during the Ngondo

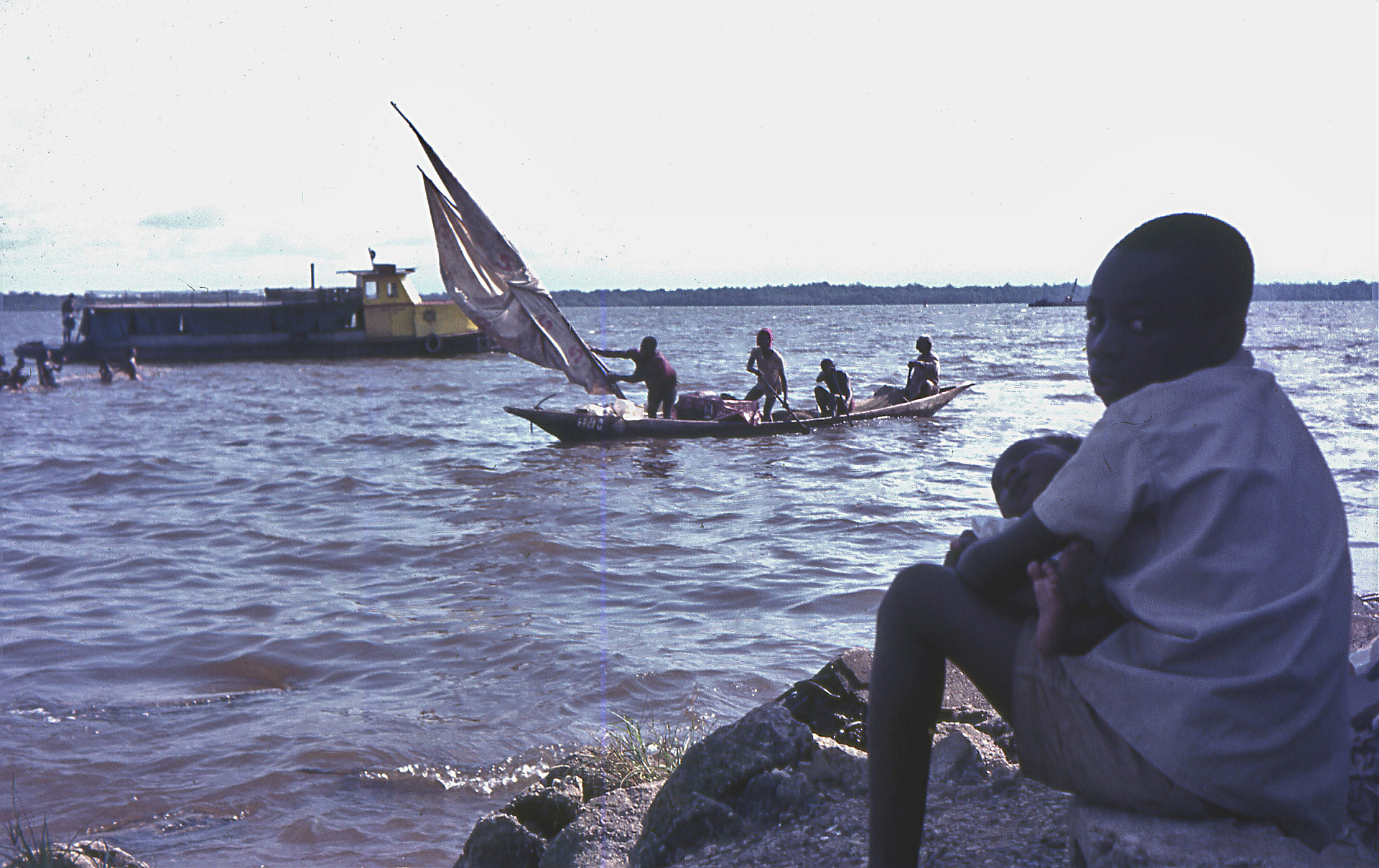
Fishermen on the Wouri

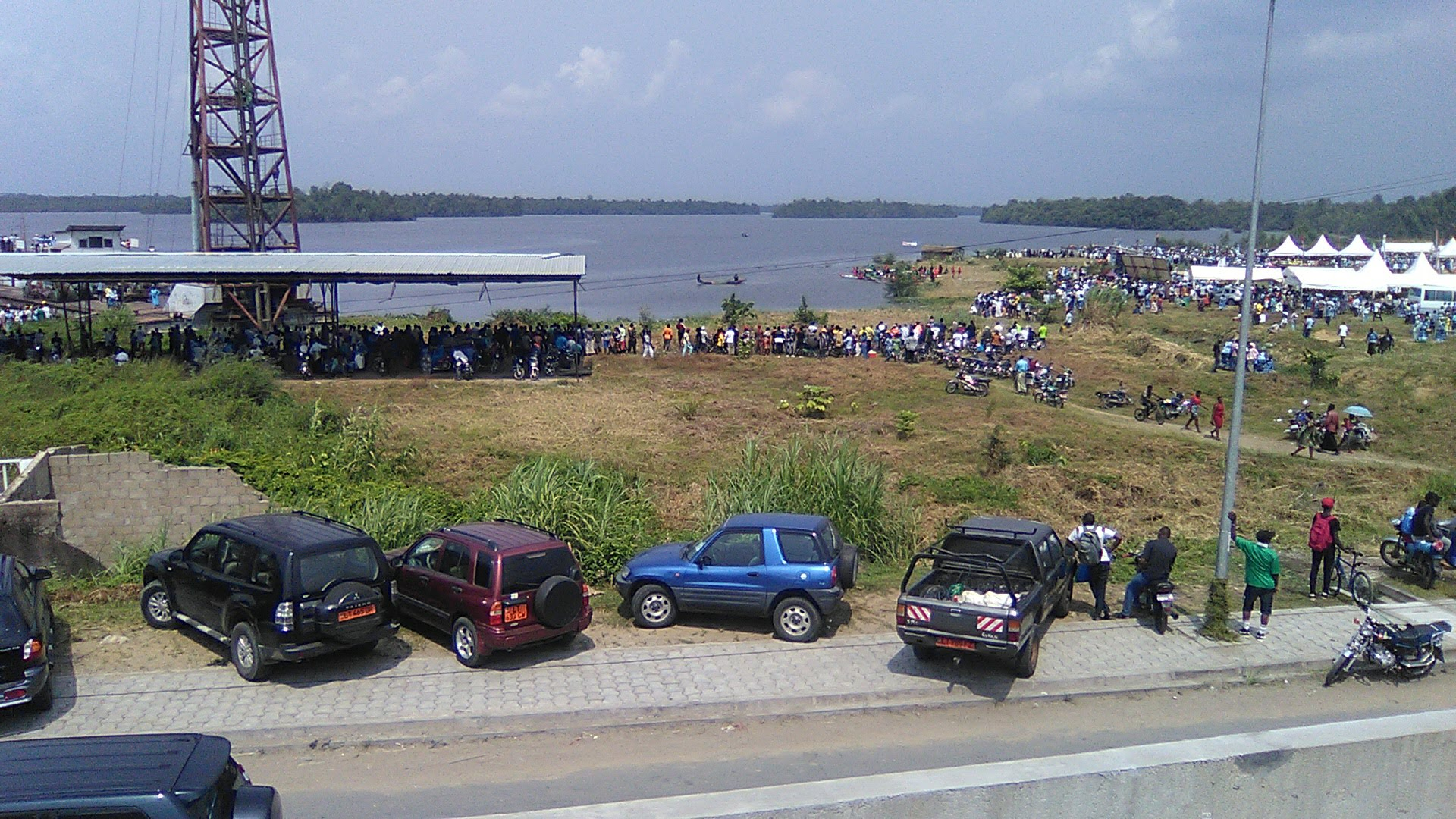
A view of Wouri banks during Ngondo festival

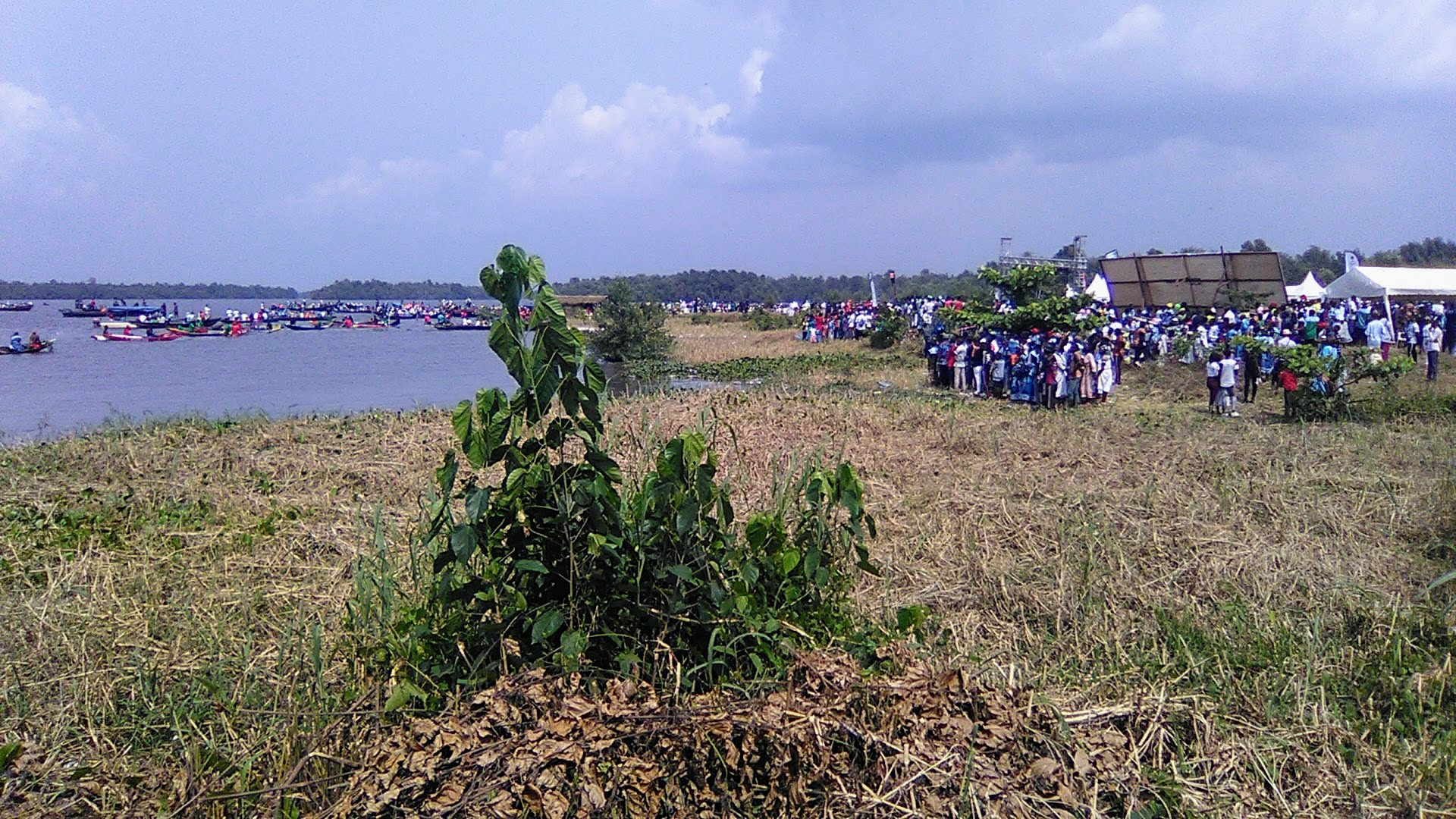

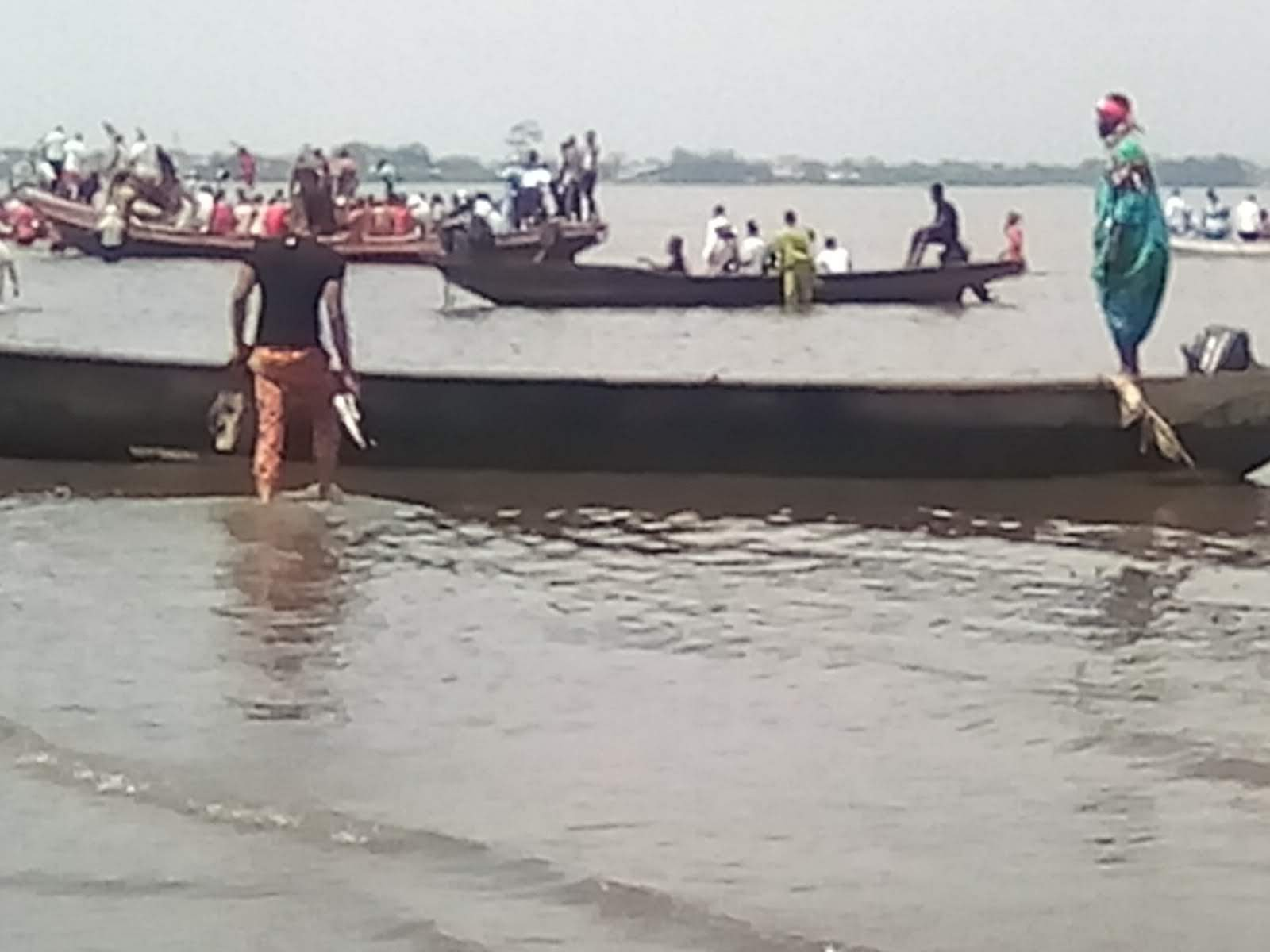

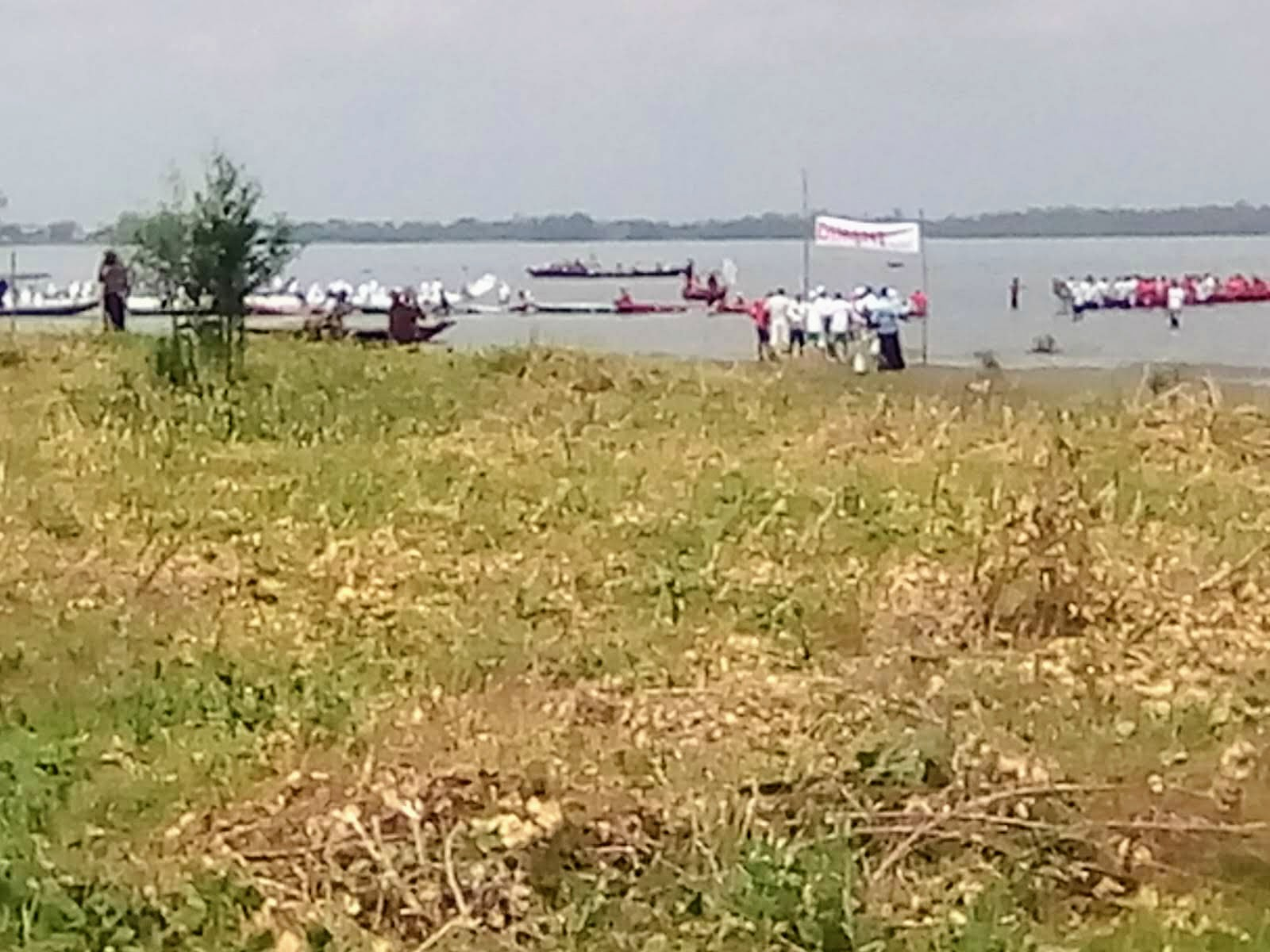

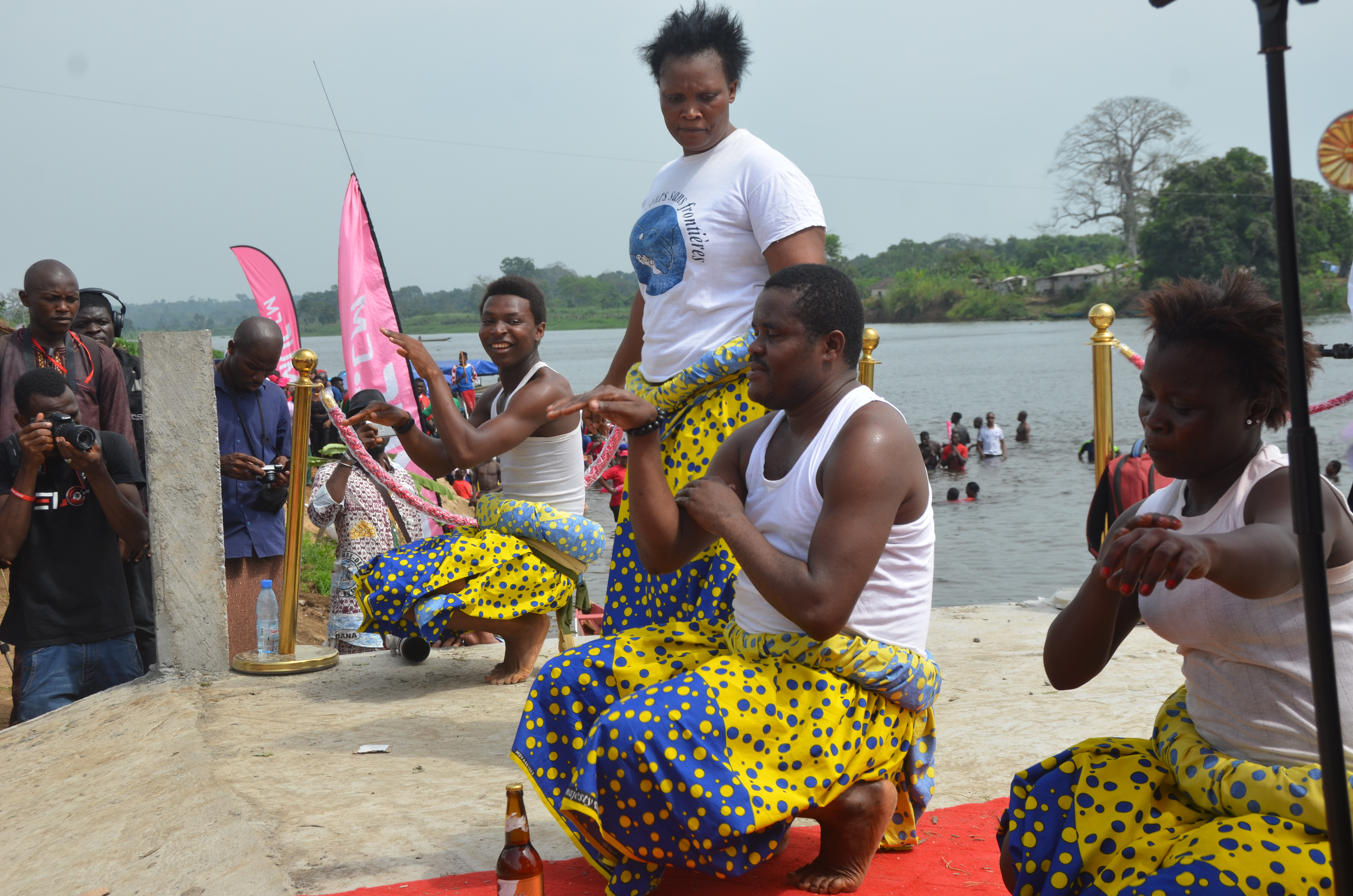
Dance group during Ngondo festival

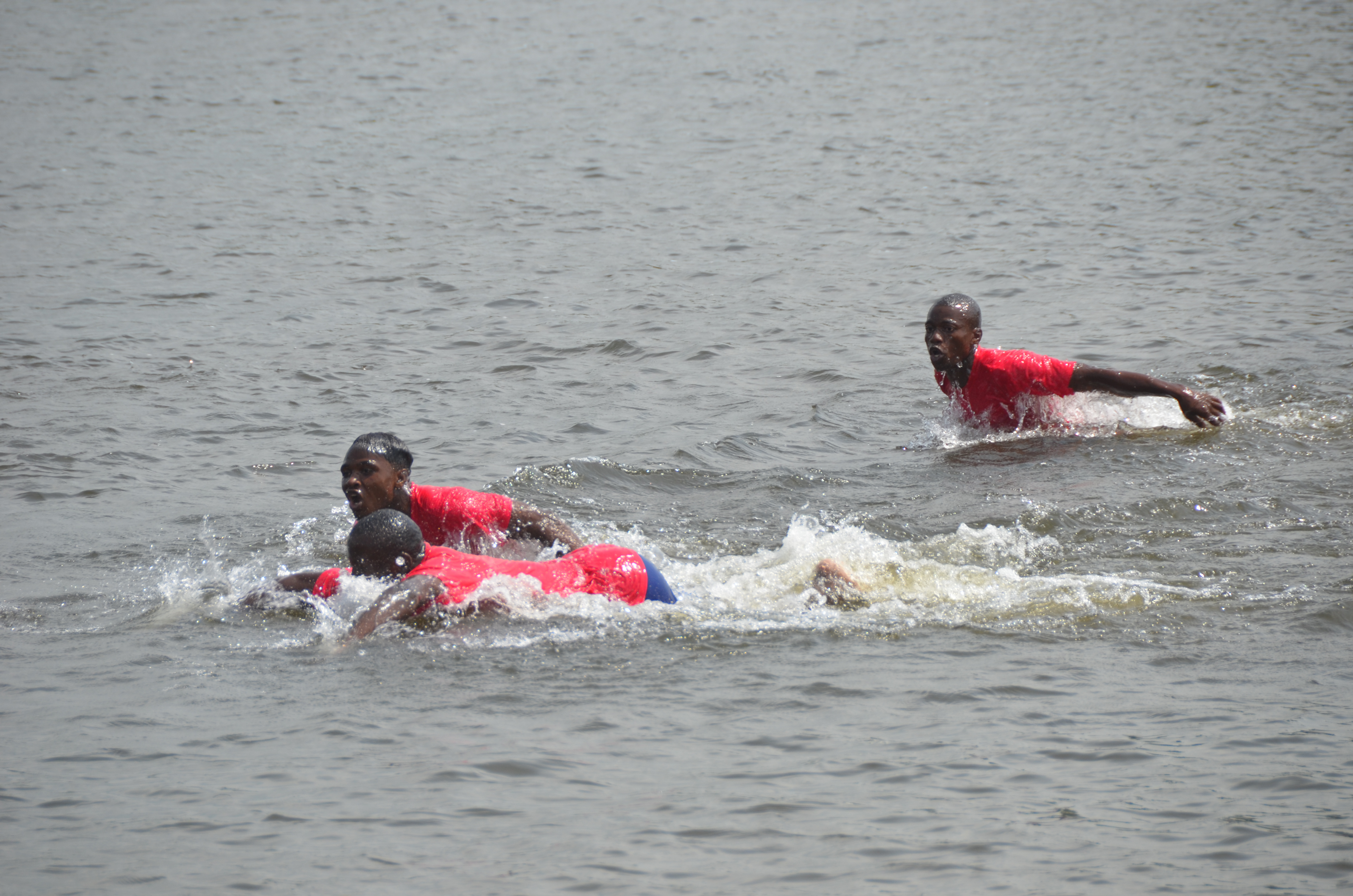
Swimming Competition

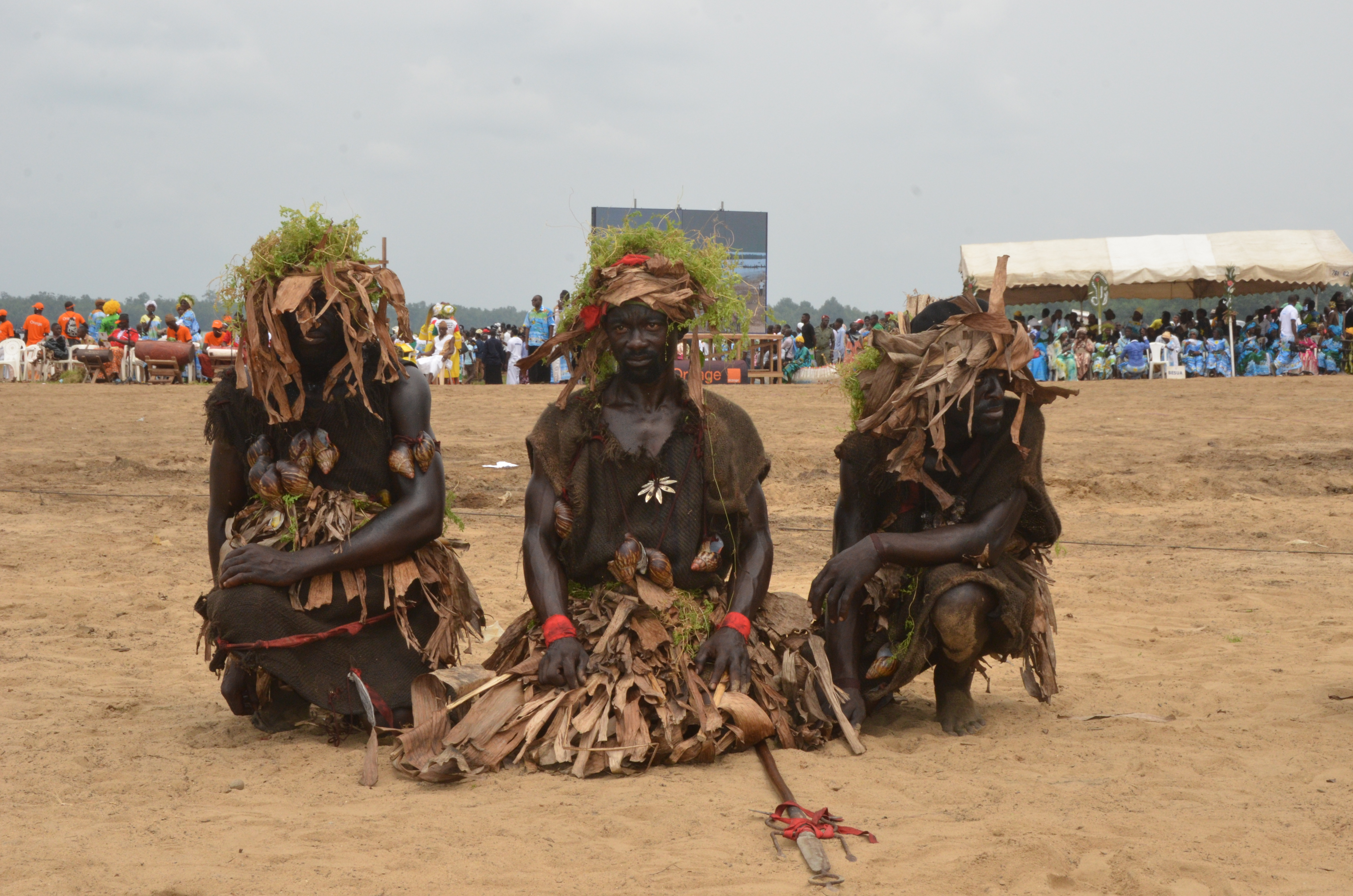

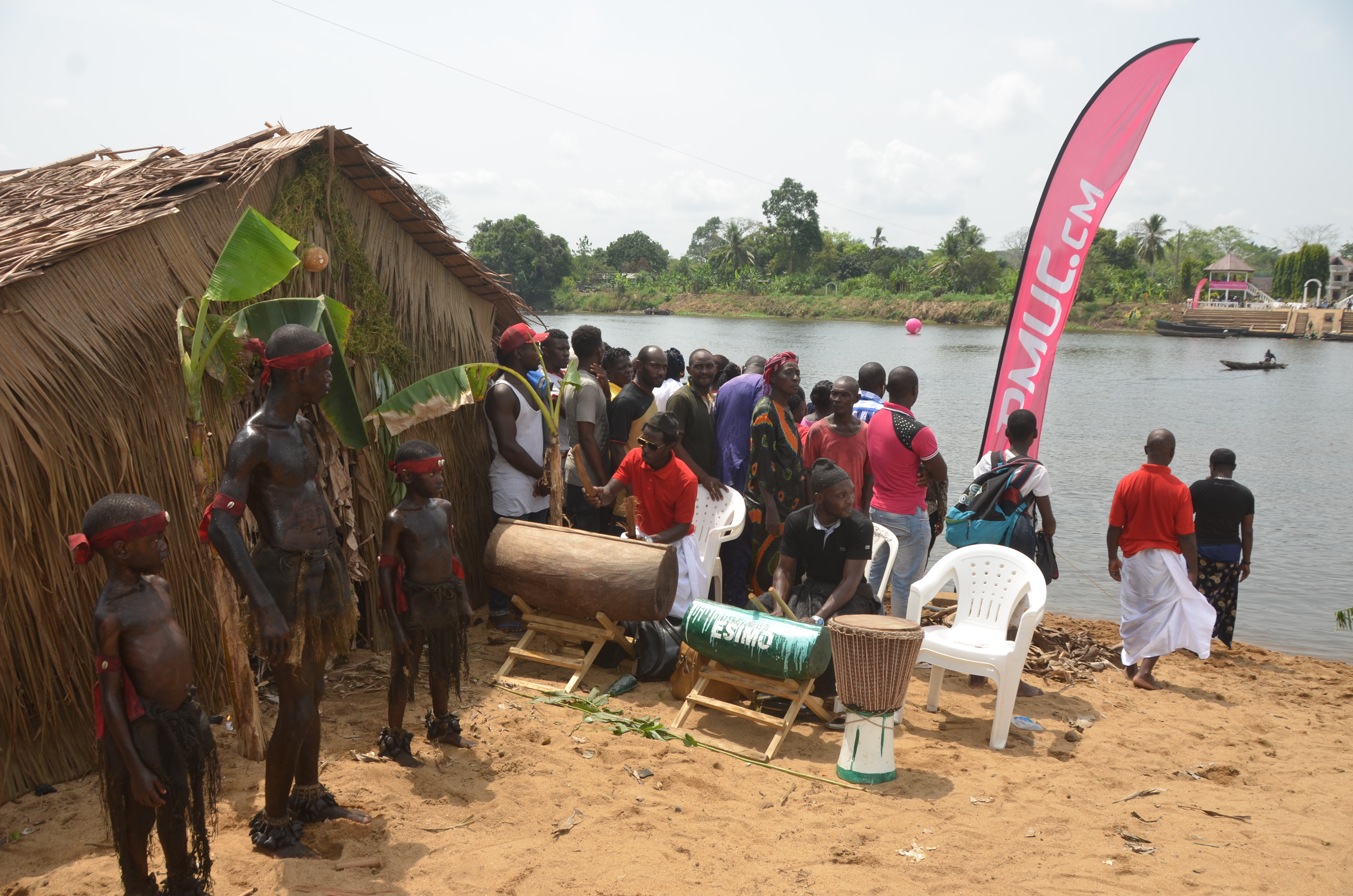
Traditional rights done along the Wouri Banks

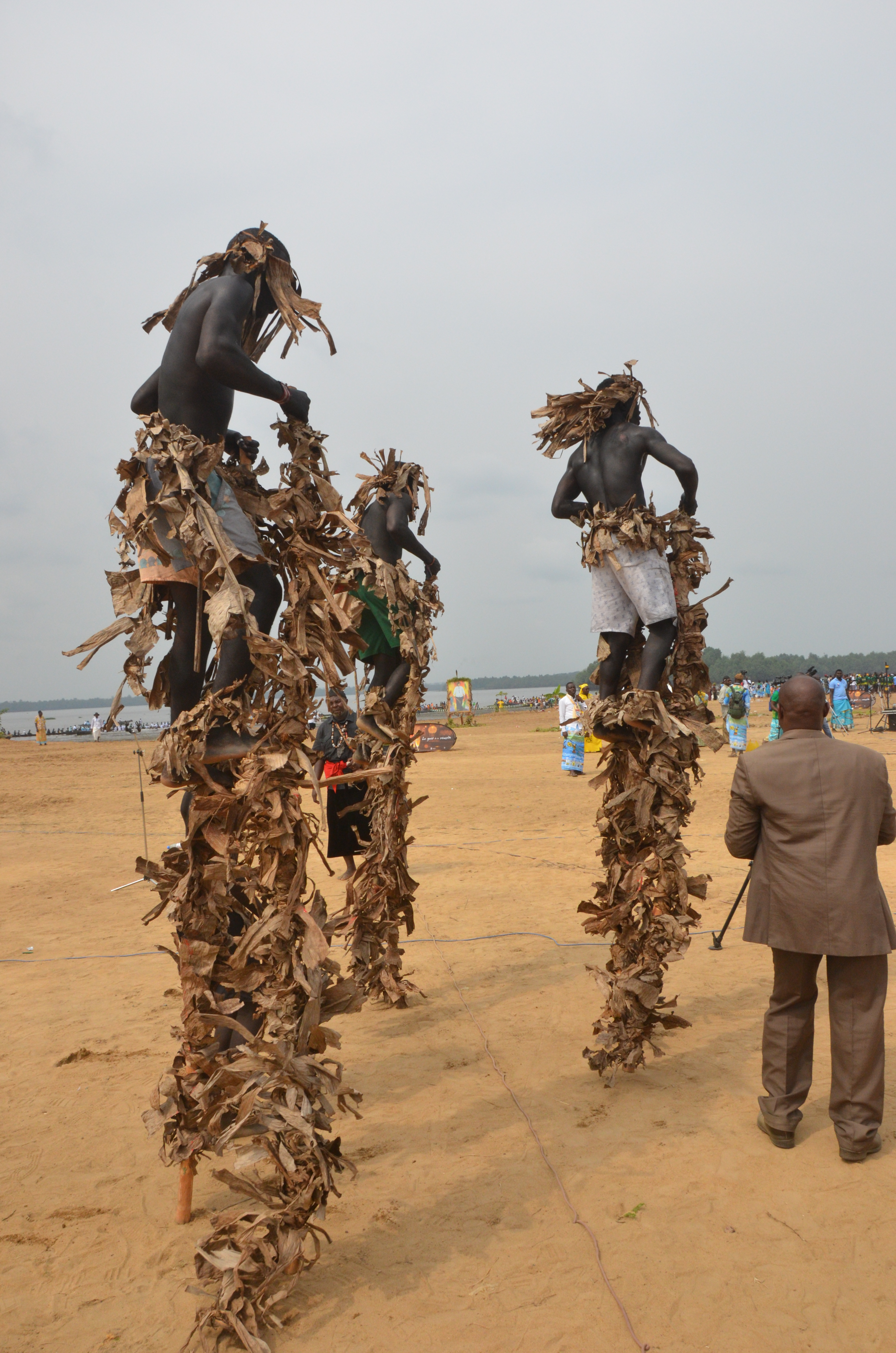
Cultural Dance Performance

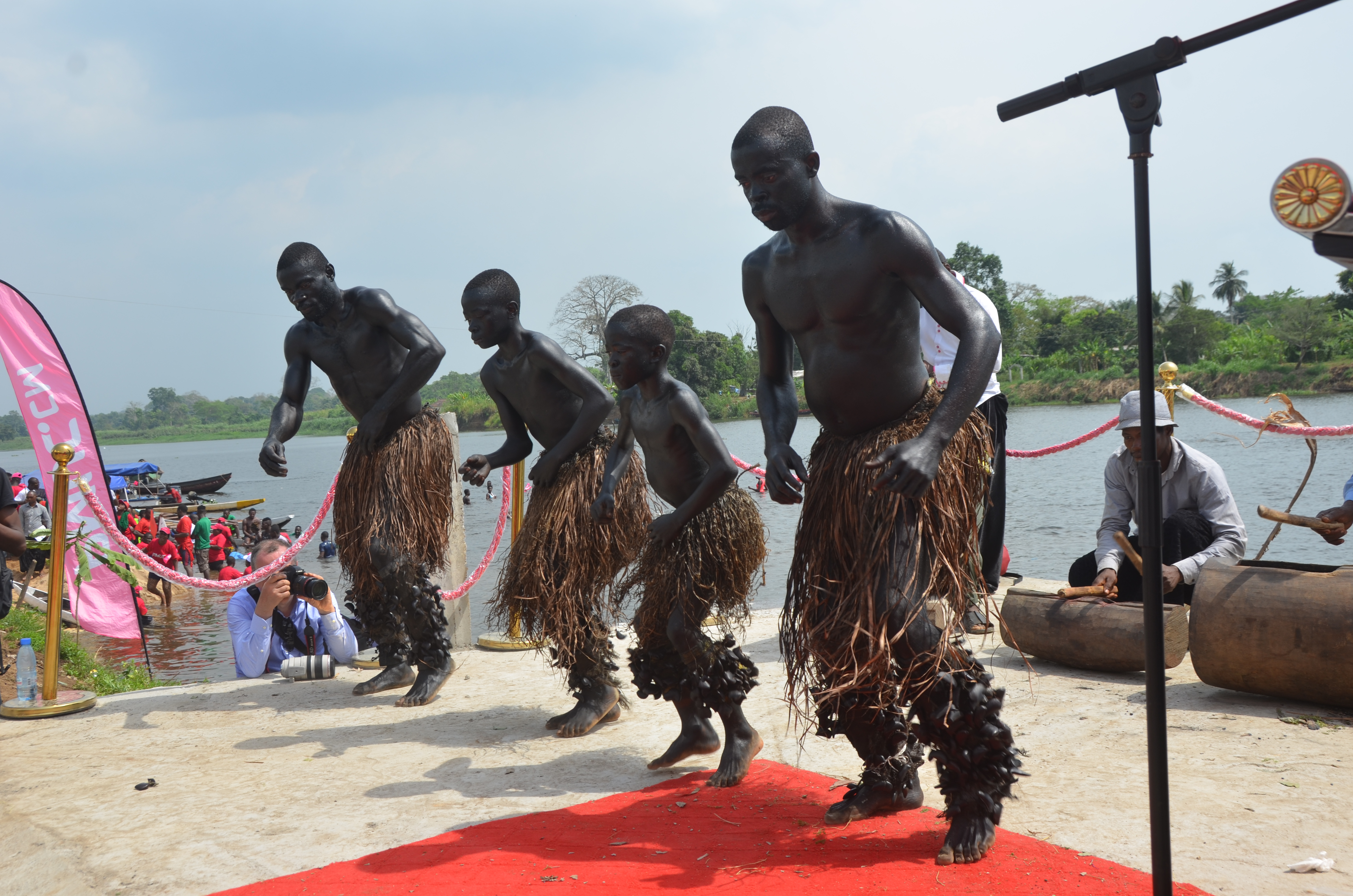
Dance performance at the Wouri banks during Ngondo

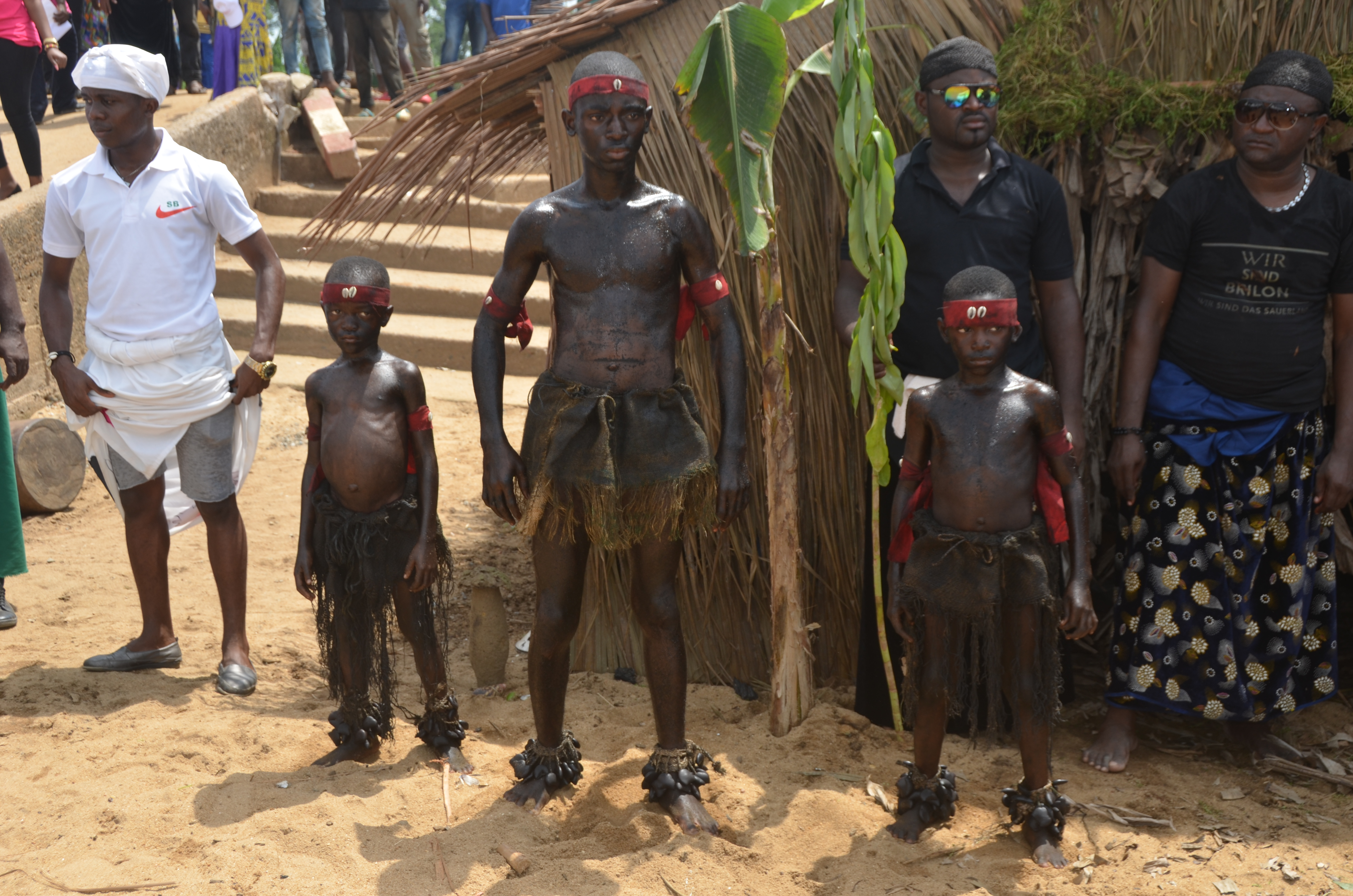

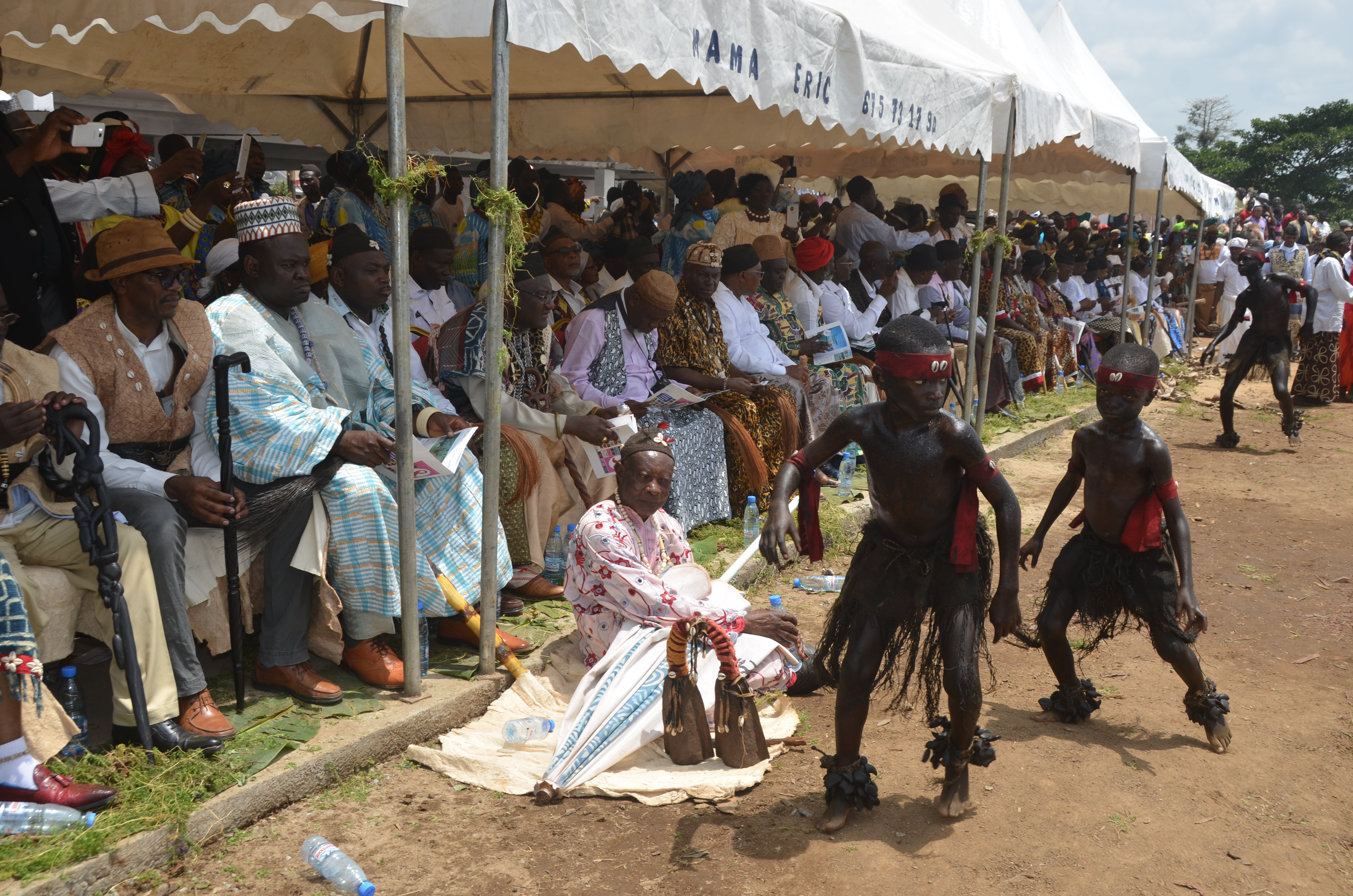

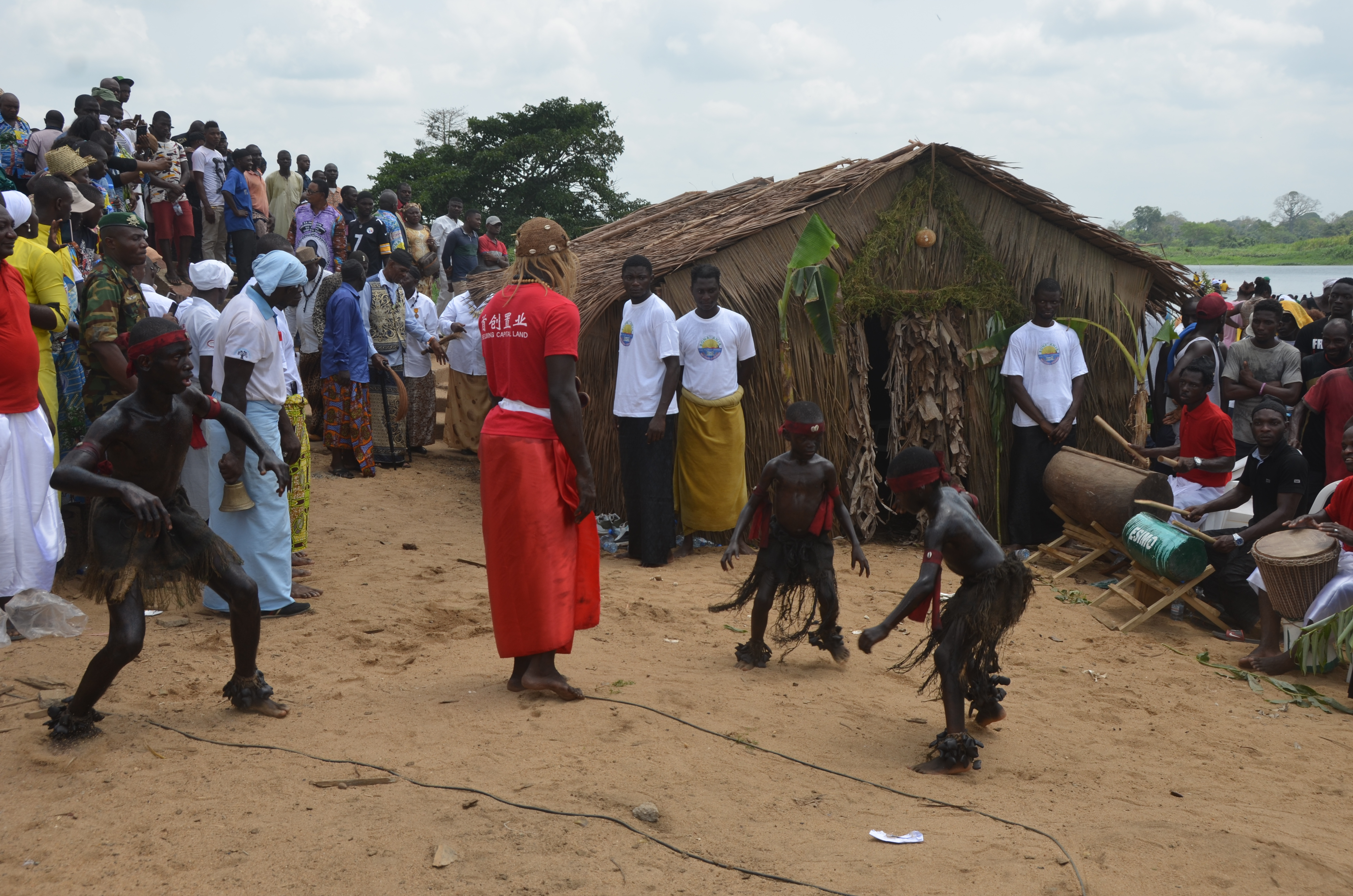

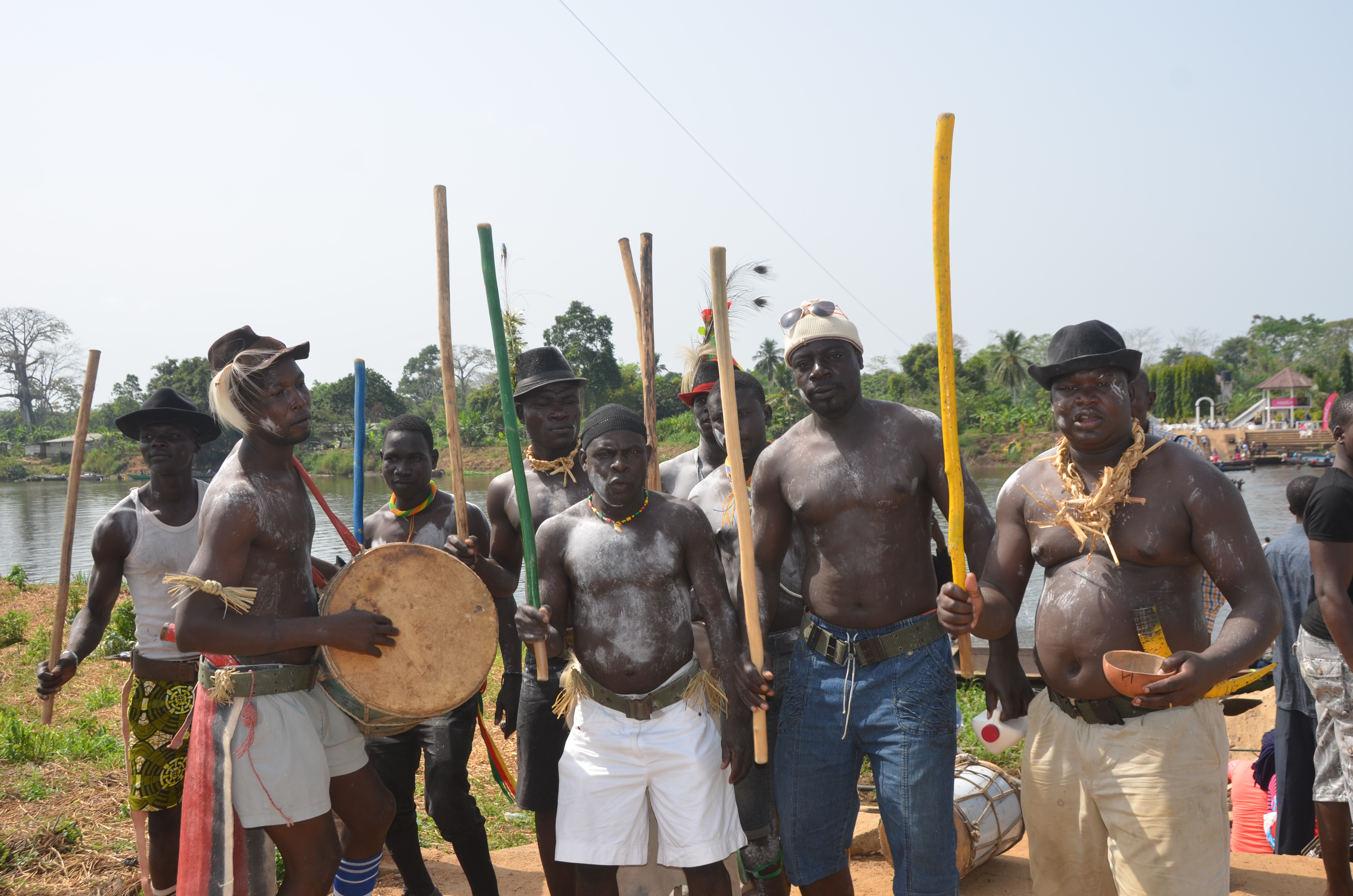
Ngondo activities at the Wouri banks

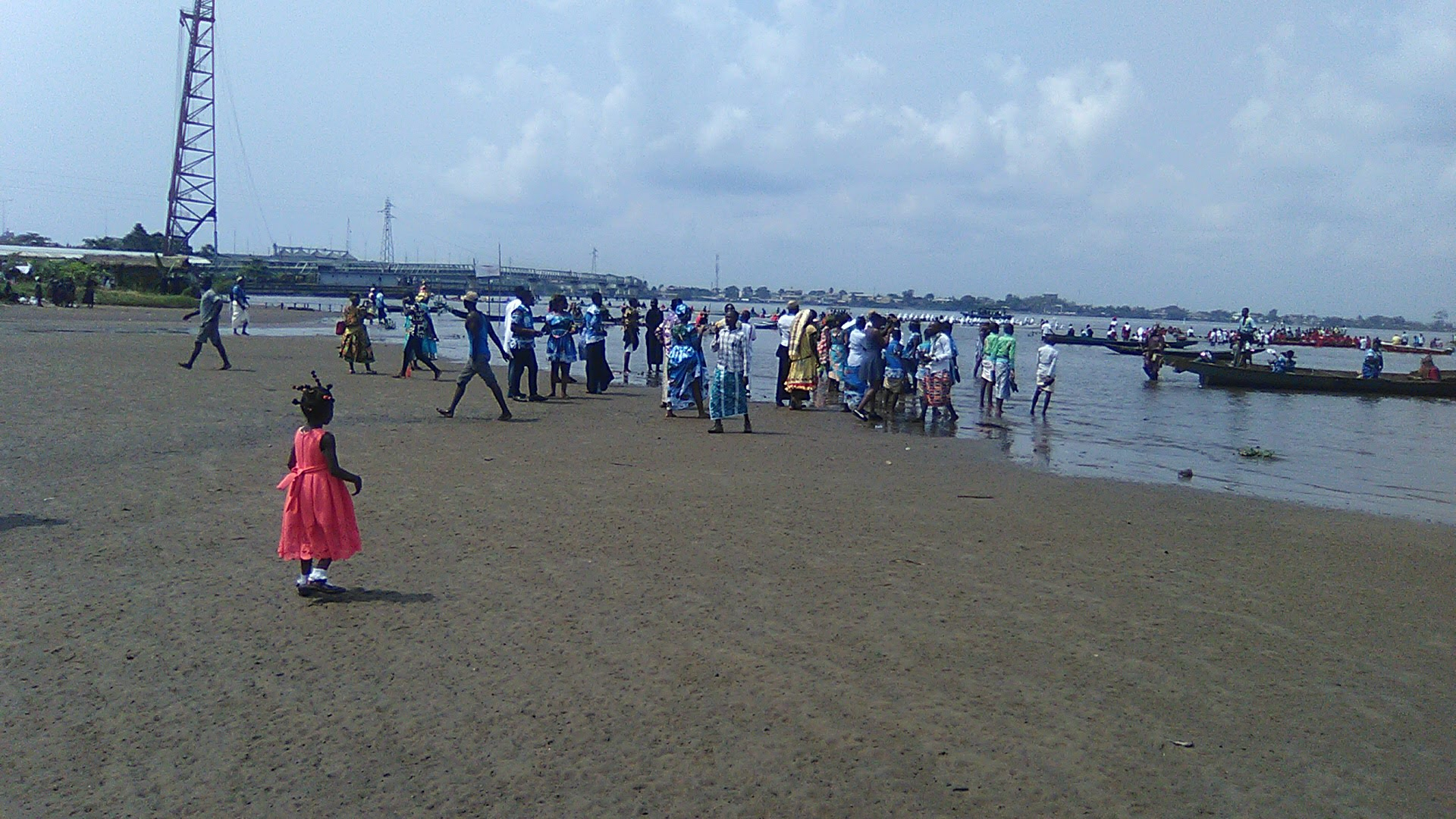

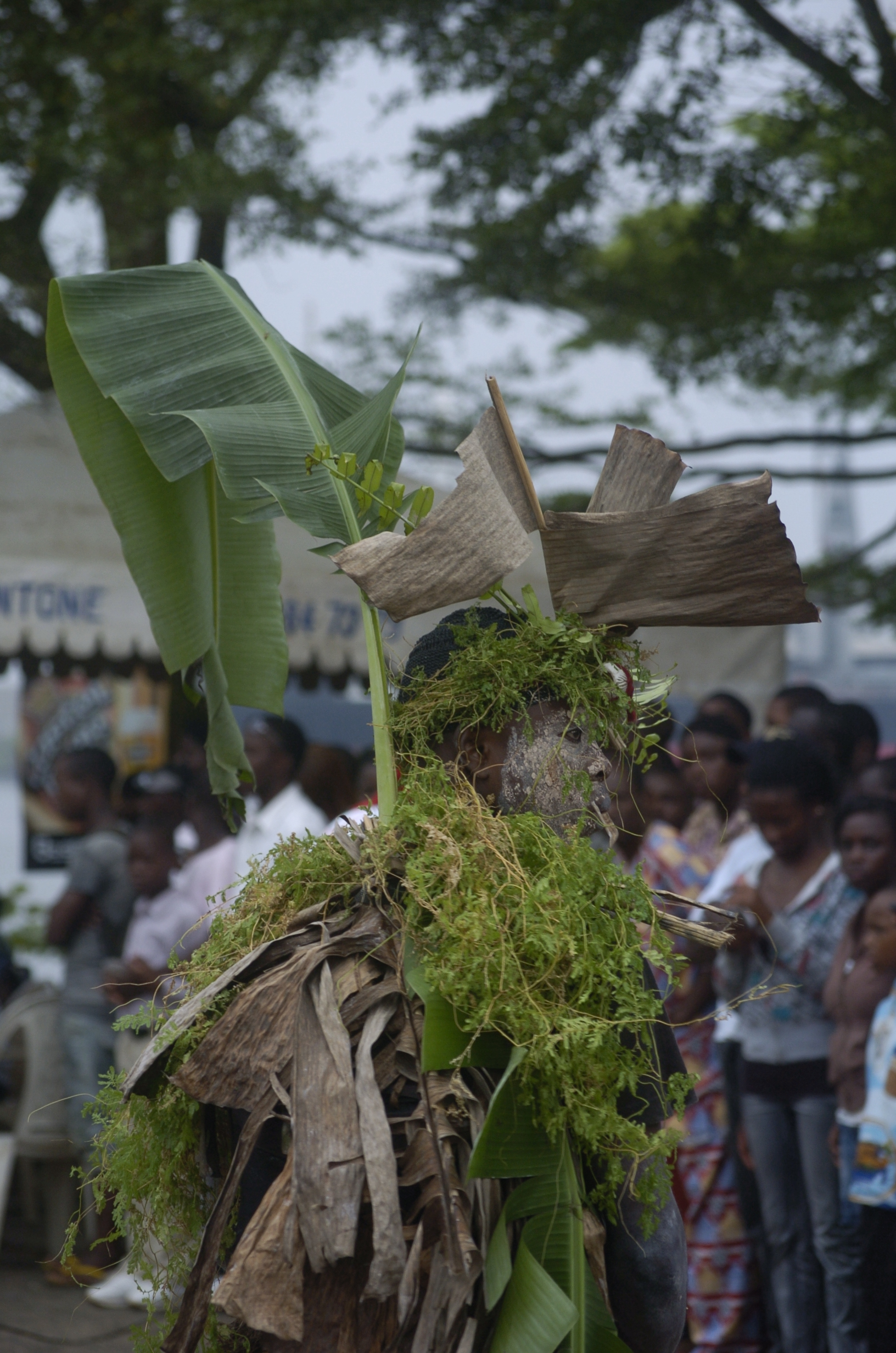

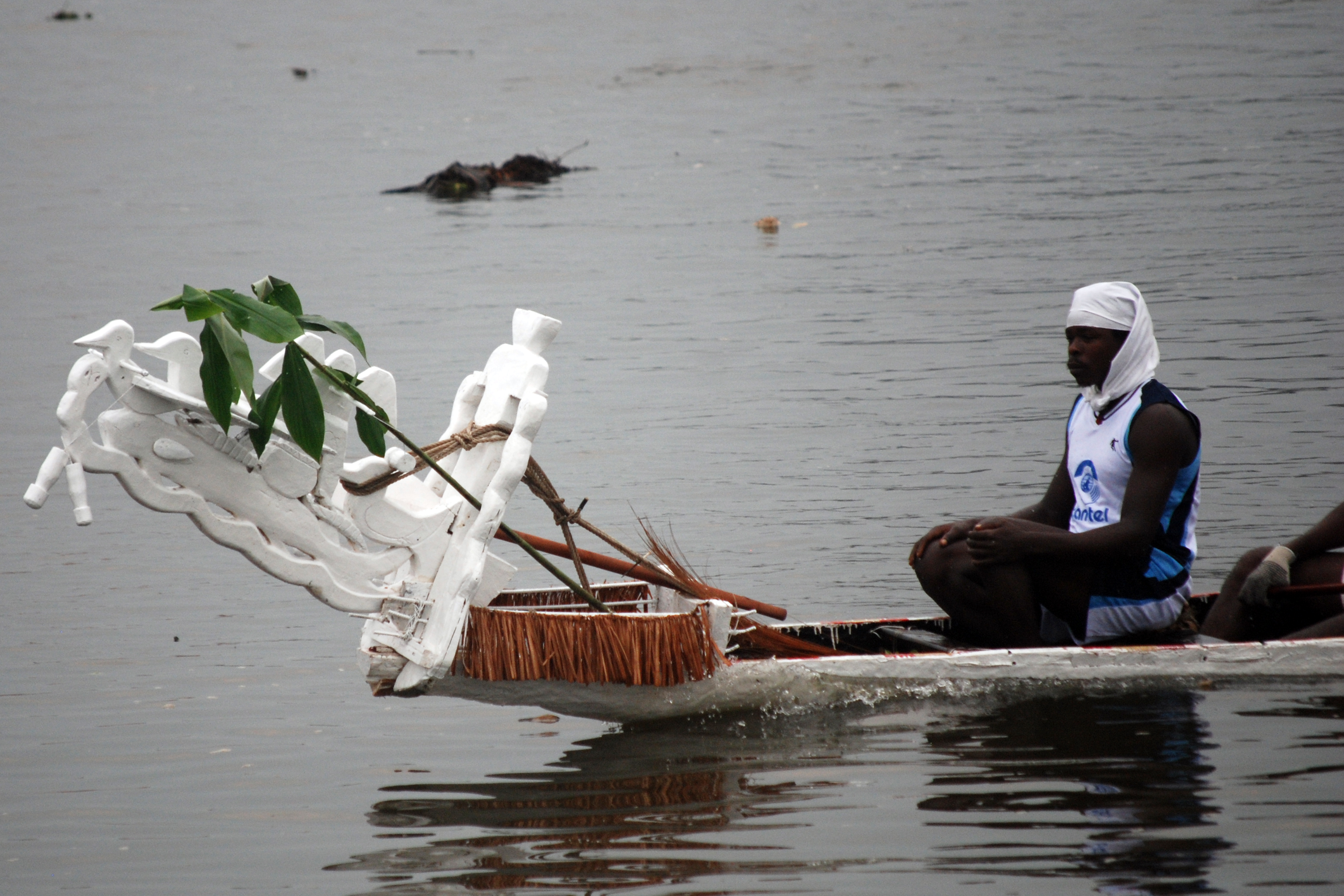

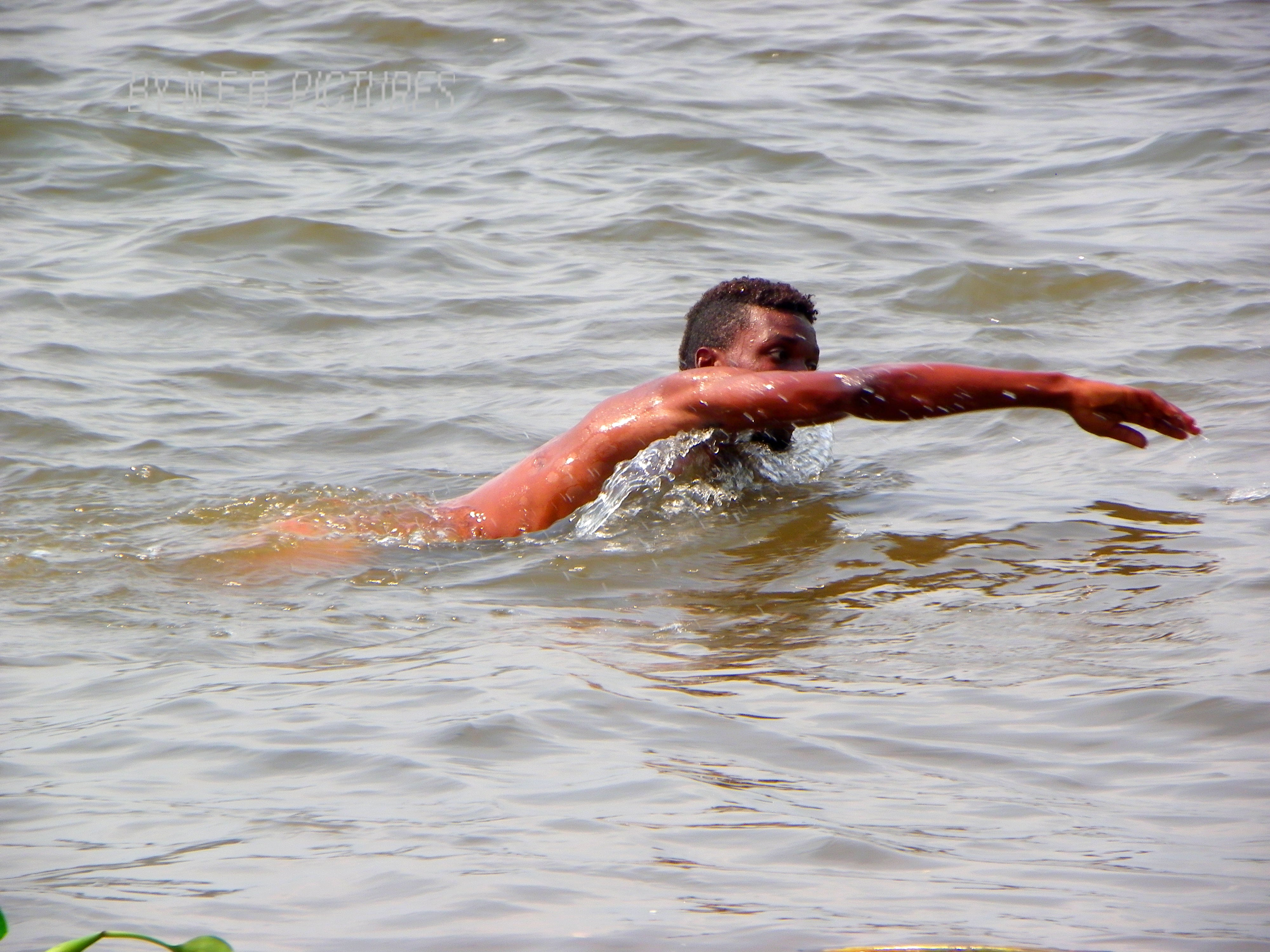
A man swimming in the Wouri River

== Sources ==
- Encyclopædia Britannica
