= Galim, Cameroon =

Galim
- Commune and town
- Location in Cameroon
- Coordinates: 5.6911°N 10.3664°E
- Country: Cameroon
- Region: West Region
- Department: Bamboutos
- Time zone: UTC+1 (WAT)

Galim is a town and commune in the country of Cameroon, located in the Bamboutos department of the West Region.

== See also ==
- Communes of Cameroon
