= Batcham =

Coordinates: 5°32′N 10°14′E

- Commune and town
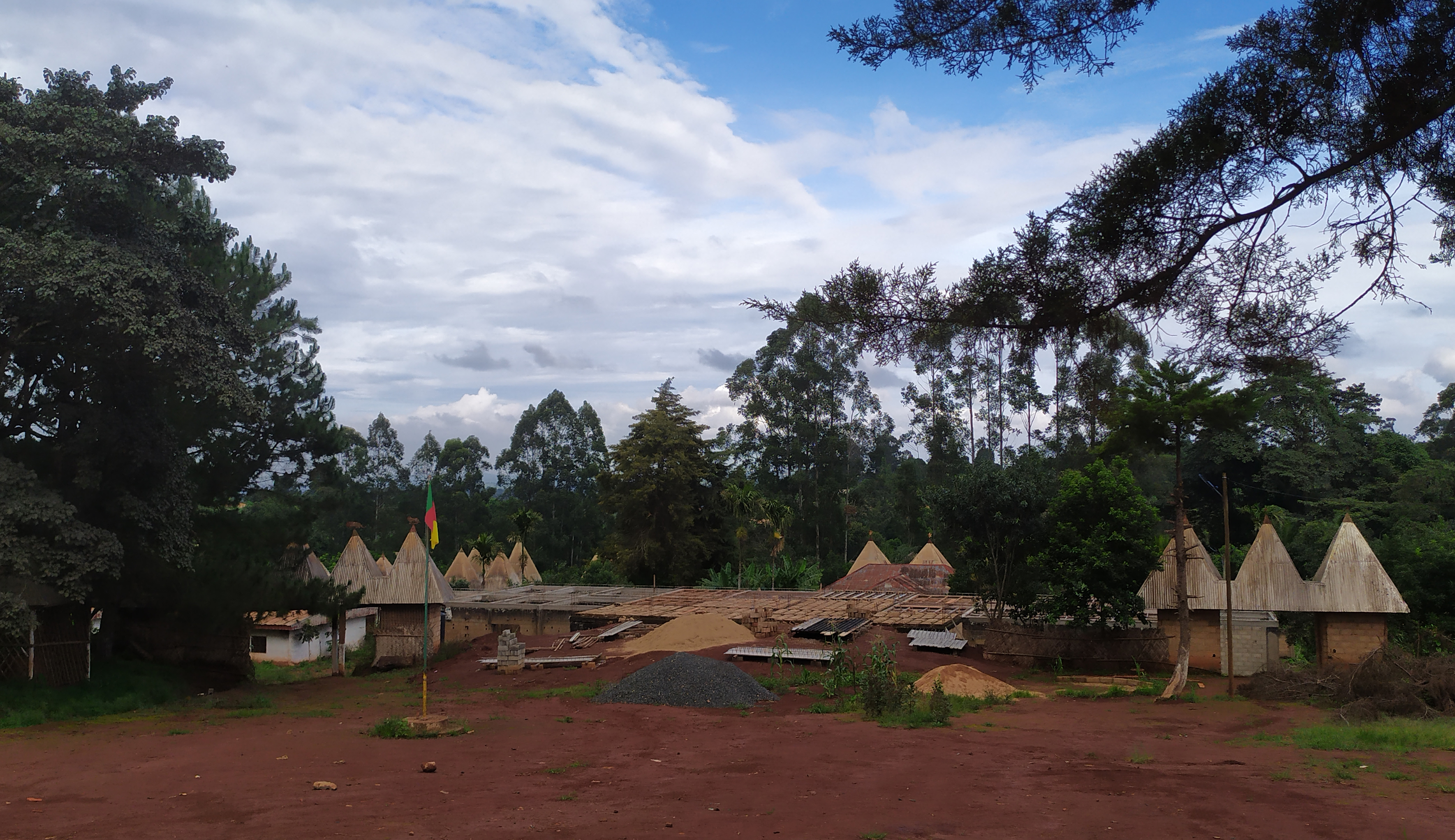
- Batcham chiefdom building
- Interactive map of Batcham
- Country: Cameroon
- Time zone: UTC+1 (WAT)

Batcham is a town and commune in Cameroon. It is located in the Bamboutos department, in the West region. The commune was created by decree in 1962. The Batcham municipality has two First Class chiefdoms (Bangang and Batcham) one Second Class chiefdom, (Bamougong) and approximately 165 Third class chieftaincies.

The department covers an area of 185 km^{2} and a total population of 160 000.

== See also ==
- Communes of Cameroon
