= Bamboutos =

- Department
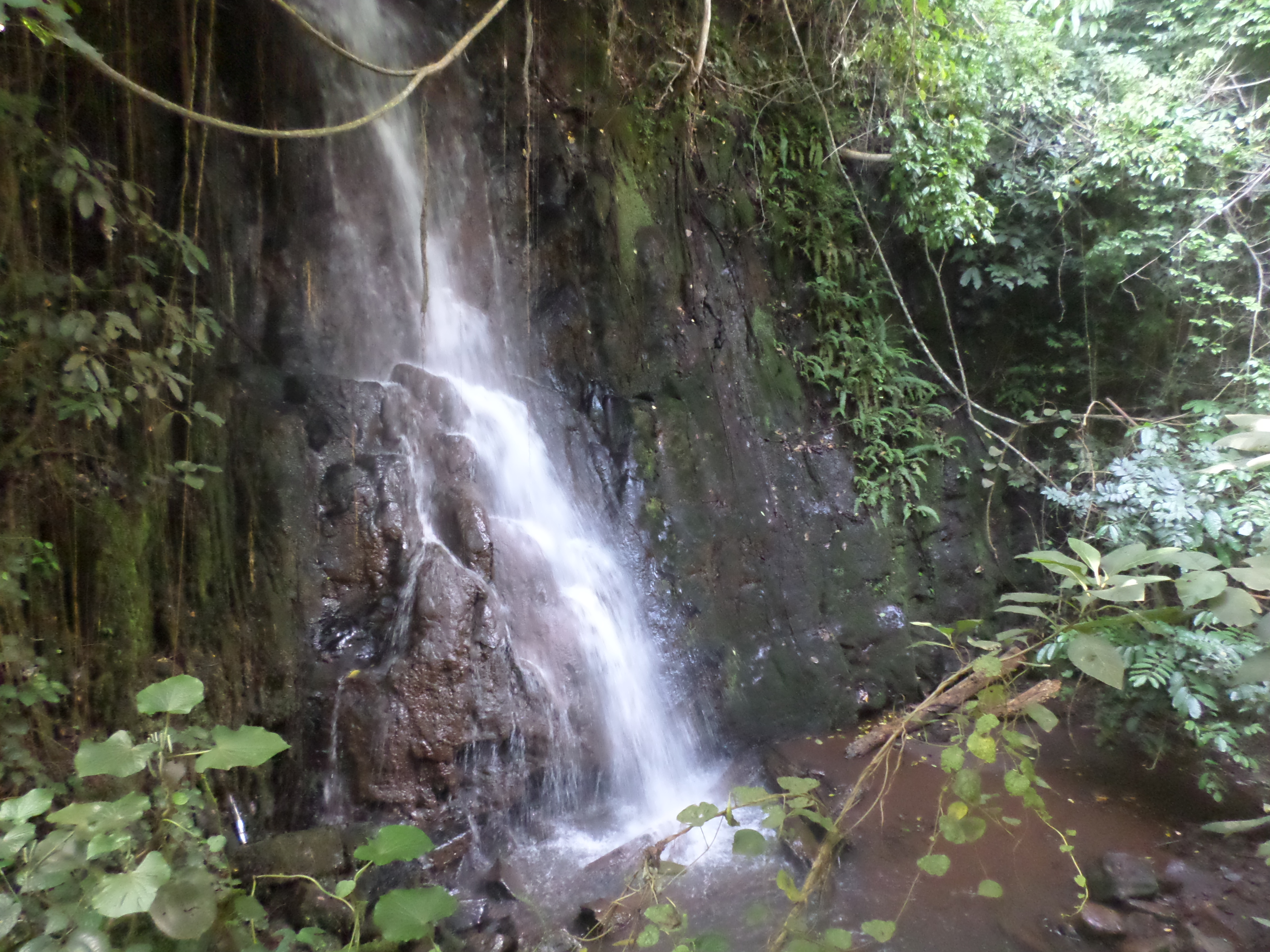
- waterfall at bamboutos

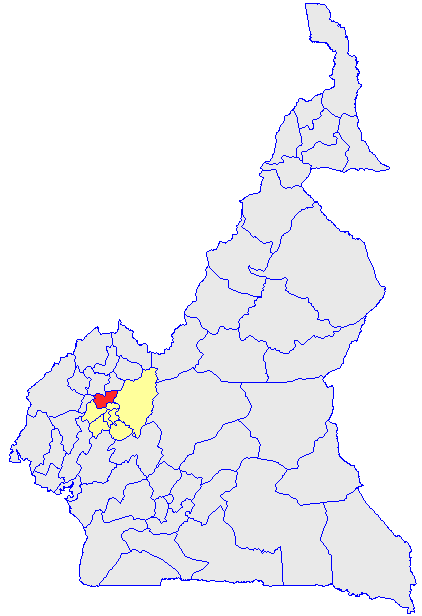
- Department location in Cameroon

- Location within Cameroon Location within Africa
- Coordinates: 5°37′N 10°15′E
- Country: Cameroon
- Province: West Region
- Capital: Mbouda

Government
  - Governor: Moïse Djoumessi
  - Deputy Governor: Claude Pouokam

Area
  - Total: 453 sq mi (1,173 km^{2})
- Elevation: 8,330 ft (2,540 m)

Population (2019)
  - Total: 234,600
- Time zone: UTC+1 (WAT)

Bamboutos is a department of West Region in Cameroon. The department covers an area of 1,173 km^{2} and as of 2005 had a total population of 292,410. The capital of the department lies at Mbouda.

== Subdivisions ==
The department is divided administratively into 4 communes and in turn into villages.

=== Communes ===
- Babadjou
- Batcham
- Mbouda
- Galim
