= West Region (Cameroon) =

Region of Cameroon

West Region Région de l'Ouest
- Region of Cameroon
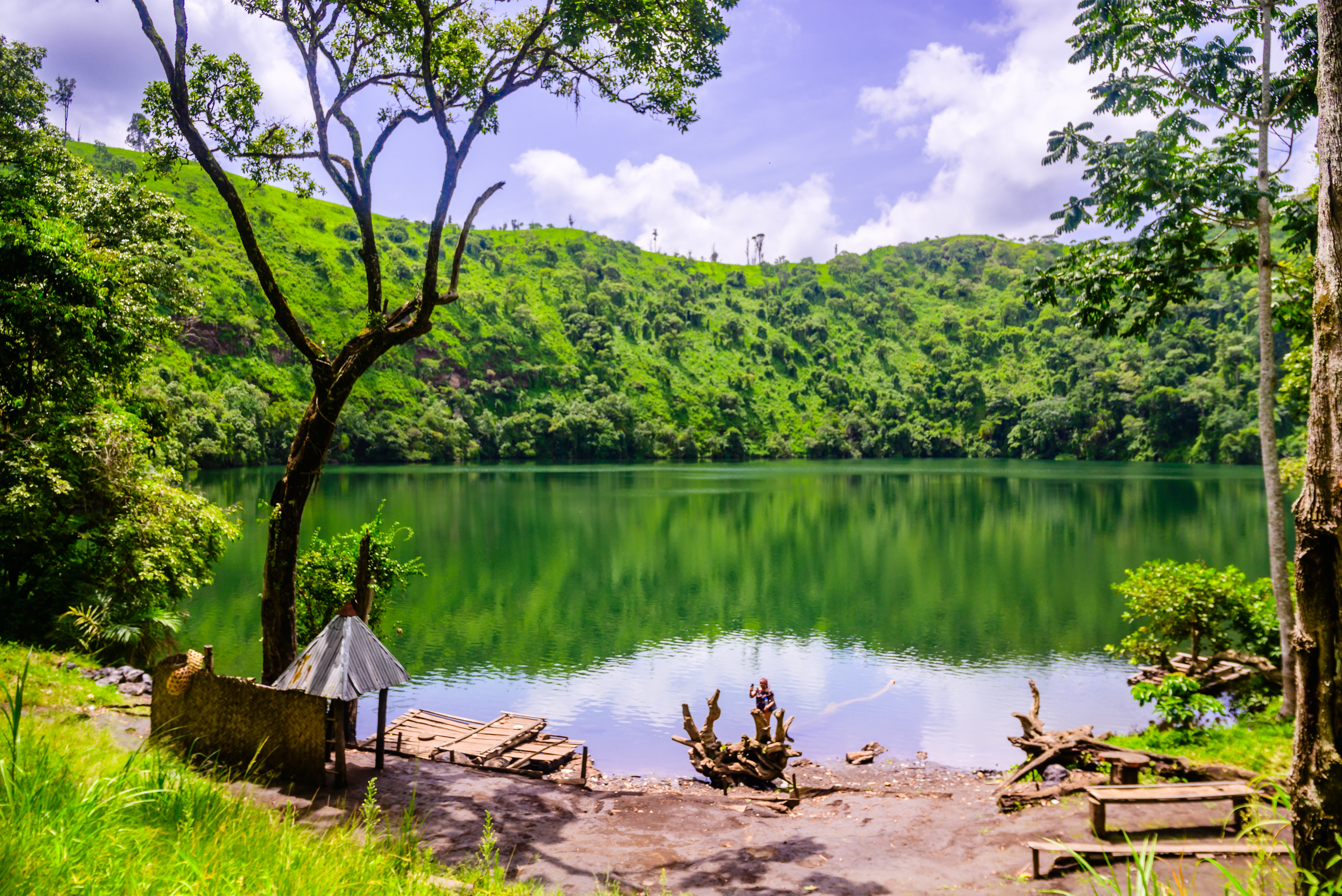
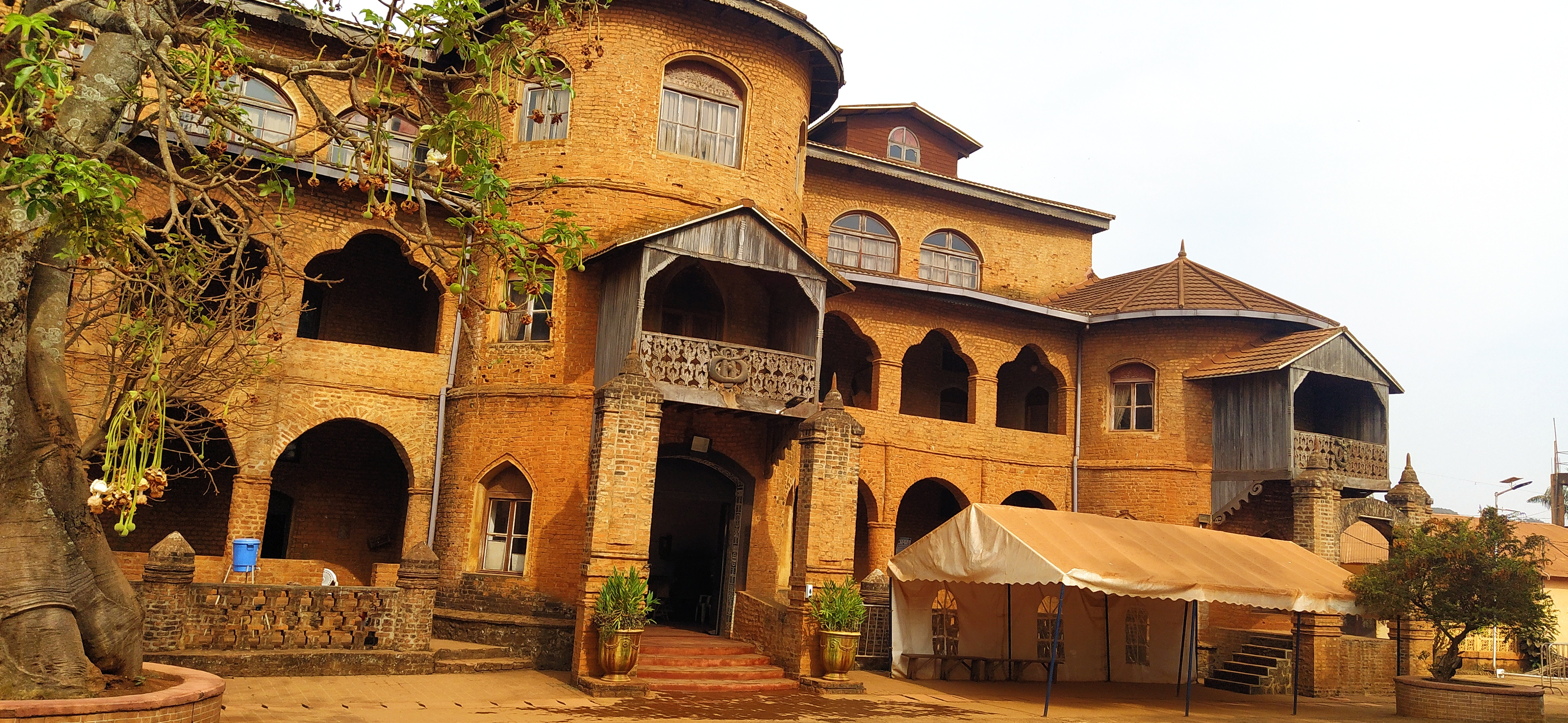
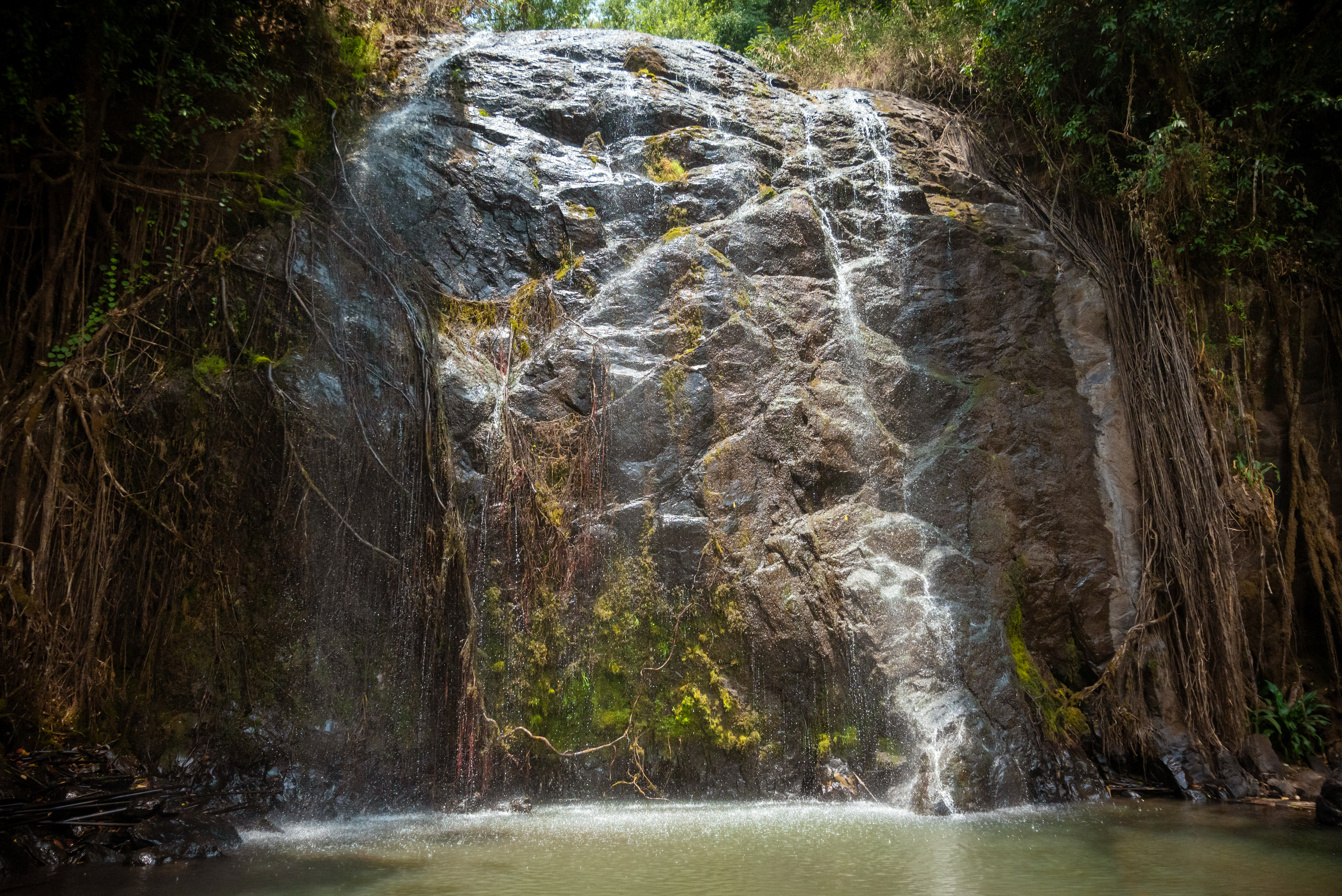
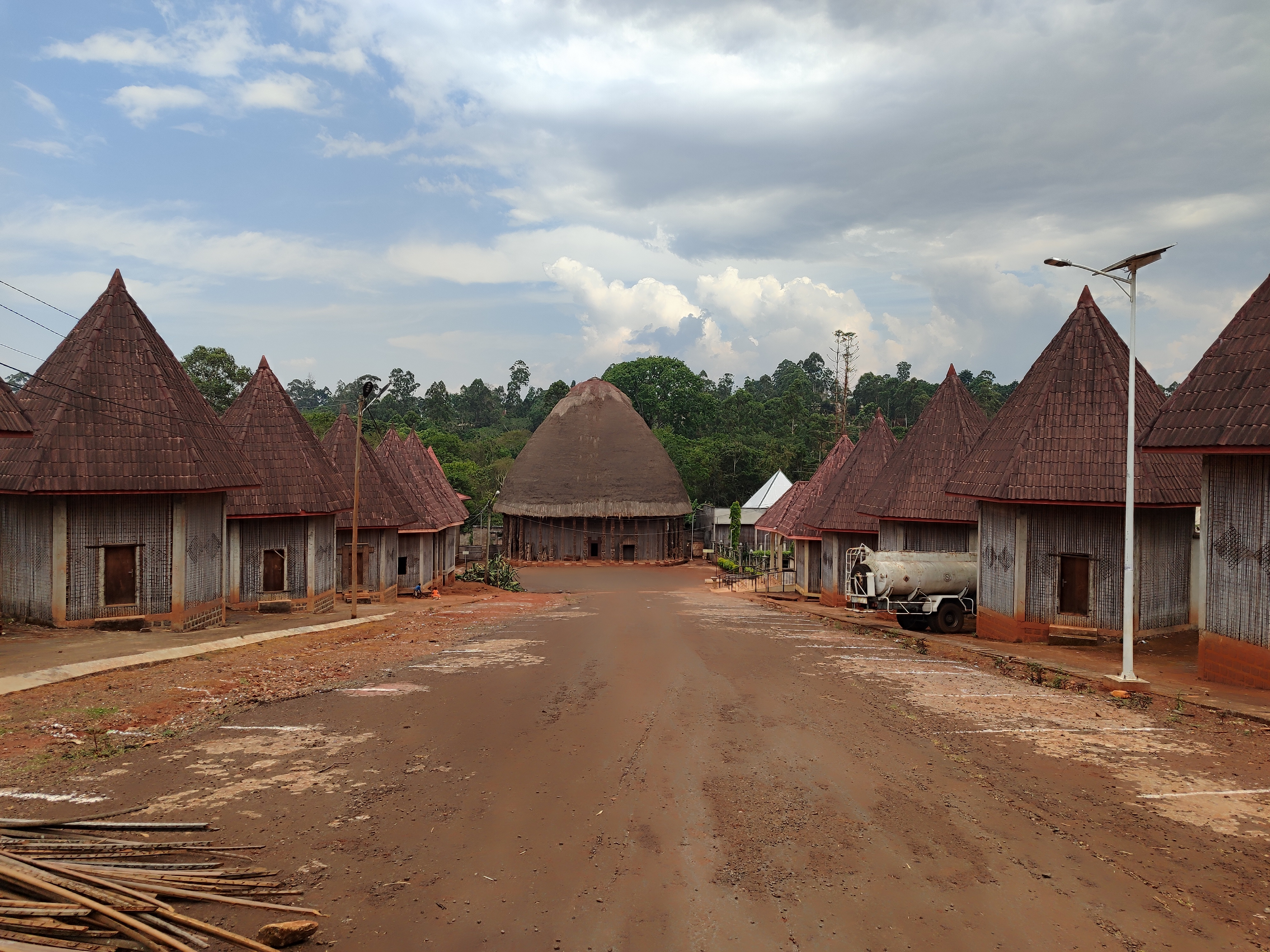
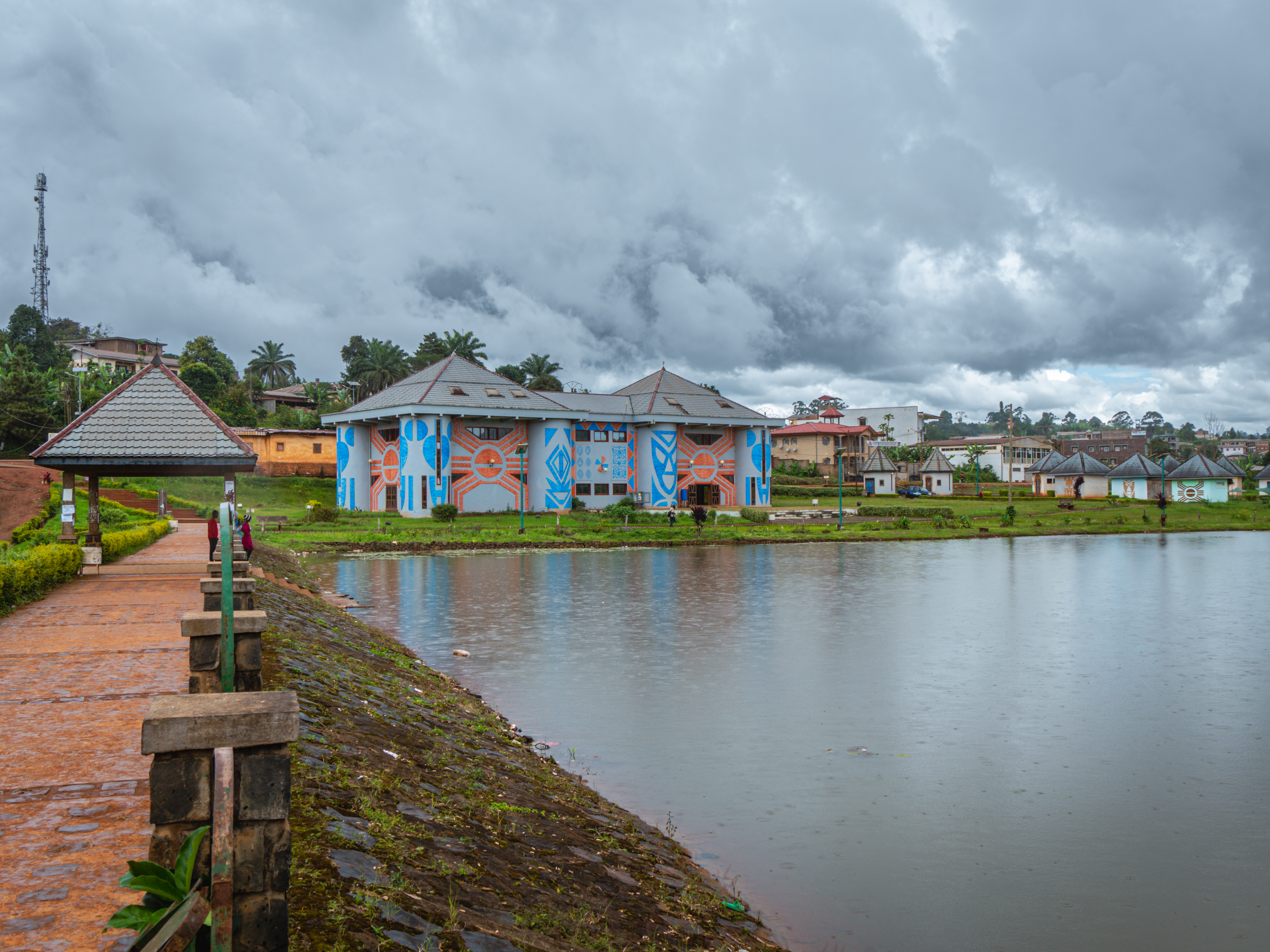
- Clockwise from top: Lake Baleng, Mepibwa Waterfalls, Musée des Civilisations in Dschang, Bandjoun Museum & Foumban Royal Palace

- Location of West Region within Cameroon
- Coordinates: 5°30′N 10°30′E
- Country: Cameroon
- Capital: Bafoussam
- Divisions: Bamboutos, Haut-Nkam, Hauts-Plateaux, Koung-Khi, Ménoua, Mifi, Ndé, Noun

Government
  - Governor: Awa Fonka Augustine

Area
  - Total: 13,892 km^{2} (5,364 sq mi)

Population (2019)
  - Total: 2,770,400
  - Density: 199.42/km^{2} (516.51/sq mi)
- HDI (2022): 0.627 medium · 5th of 10

The West Region (French: Région de l'Ouest) is 14,000 km^{2} of territory located in the central-western portion of the Republic of Cameroon. It borders the Northwest Region to the northwest, the Adamawa Region to the northeast, the Centre Region to the southeast, the Littoral Region to the southwest, and the Southwest Region to the west. The West Region is the smallest of Cameroon's ten regions in area, yet it has the highest population density.

As home to the enterprising Bamum and Bamileke kingdoms, the West is an economic bright spot and one of Cameroon's more developed regions. This progressive development is tempered by the strong traditional culture that persists among the Bamileke and the province's other major ethnic group, the Bamum (sometimes Bamoum, Bamun, Bamoun).

== Geography ==
=== Land ===
The West sits at the geologic crossroads of Cameroon; the soil varies greatly within a relatively small land area. The land along the Noun River and at the Bamendjing Reservoir, for example, is a lightly evolved blend of various raw minerals. The province's western half, on the other hand, is a haphazard mixture of raw minerals, granite, ferrallitic patches of red dirt, and other types. Finally, the soil of the eastern portions away from the reservoir is ferrallitic. Rocks in the area range from the volcanic along the reservoir and Noun to Precambrian deposits of crystalline rocks such as granite and gneiss under a cover of basaltic rock in the northwest. Metamorphic rocks like gneiss and mica dominate the rest of the territory. The soil throughout is mostly red in color due to high iron content, though that of the northwest is black or brown basalt. The province's soils are the richest and most productive in Cameroon.

=== Drainage ===
The West's mountainous terrain and active tectonics create many fast-moving rivers with falls and isolated crater lakes. These rivers follow a Cameroon regime, experiencing a period of high waters during the wet season and a period of low waters in the dry period. The rivers all form part of the Atlantic basin.

The Mbam River runs along the border with the Centre and Southeast Provinces. The Nkam is the name for the headwaters of the Wouri River, which flow from the West's Bamboutos Mountains. The eastern branch through the area rises northwest of Bangangté, and the western branch forms the border with the Littoral Province southwest of Bafang. These headwaters are subject to seasonal flooding. The Noun River, a tributary of the Sanaga, flows from the Centre Province, around Bafoussam, and to the Bamendjing Reservoir. This man-made lake is created by a dam on the Noun River, which helps regulate the Sanaga at Edéa in the Littoral Province and is thus an important component in Cameroon's supply of hydroelectric power. Falls are common, such as the Balatchi, Metché, and Tsugning Falls.

Most of the West's lakes are crater lakes formed from collapsed volcanoes. Such lakes exist at Balent, Banéfo, Doupé, and near Foumban. Many of these still have active volcanoes at their bottoms, particularly in the northwest on the Western High Plateau. One example is Lake Baleng, northeast of Bafoussam, and the twin lakes of Foumbot. These volcanoes can cause deposits of gas to build up at the lakebed until poisonous gases finally bubble to the surface. Such an eruption at Lake Monoun killed 37 villagers near Foumbot on 15 and 16 August 1984.

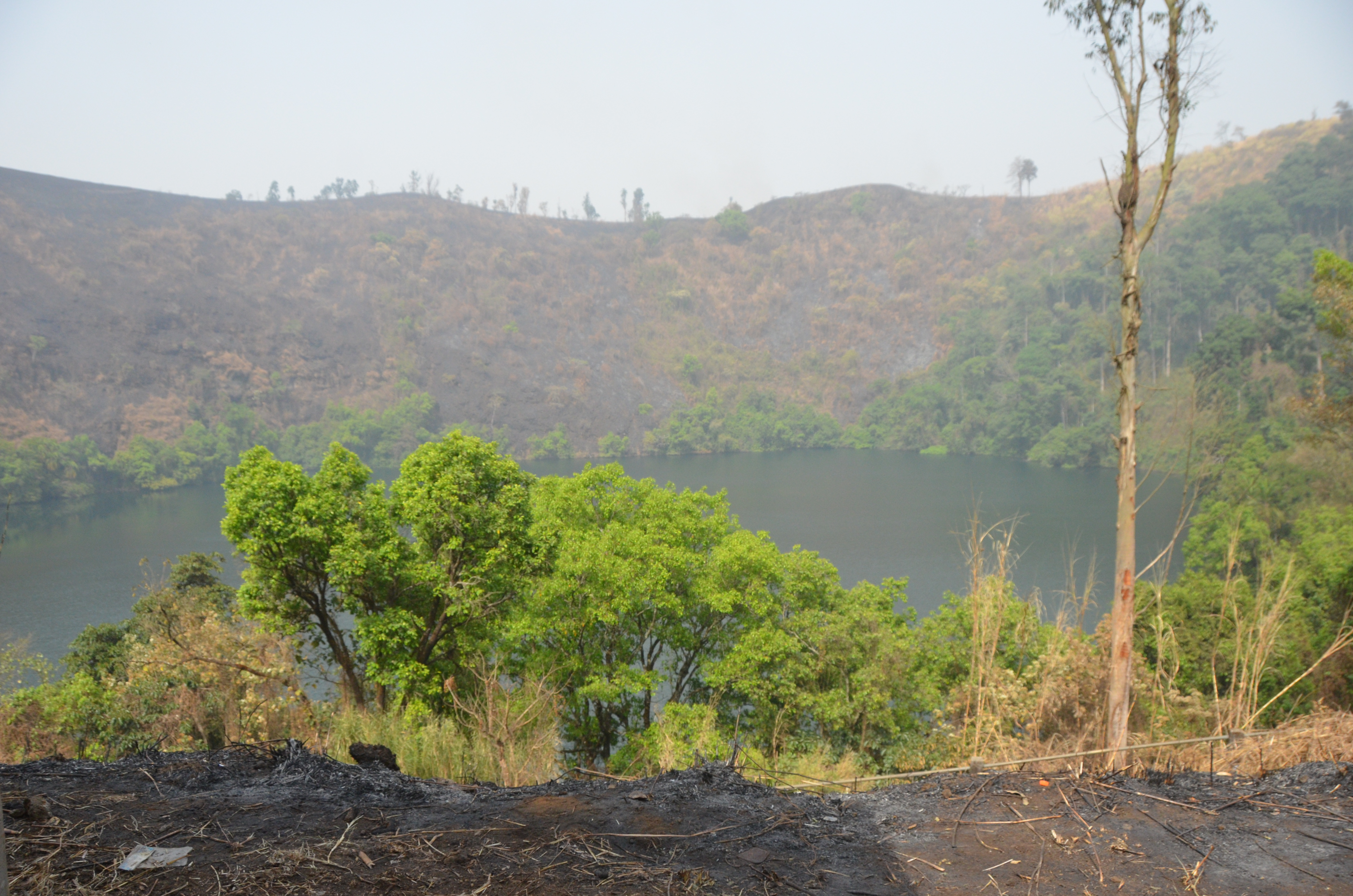
Lake Baleng

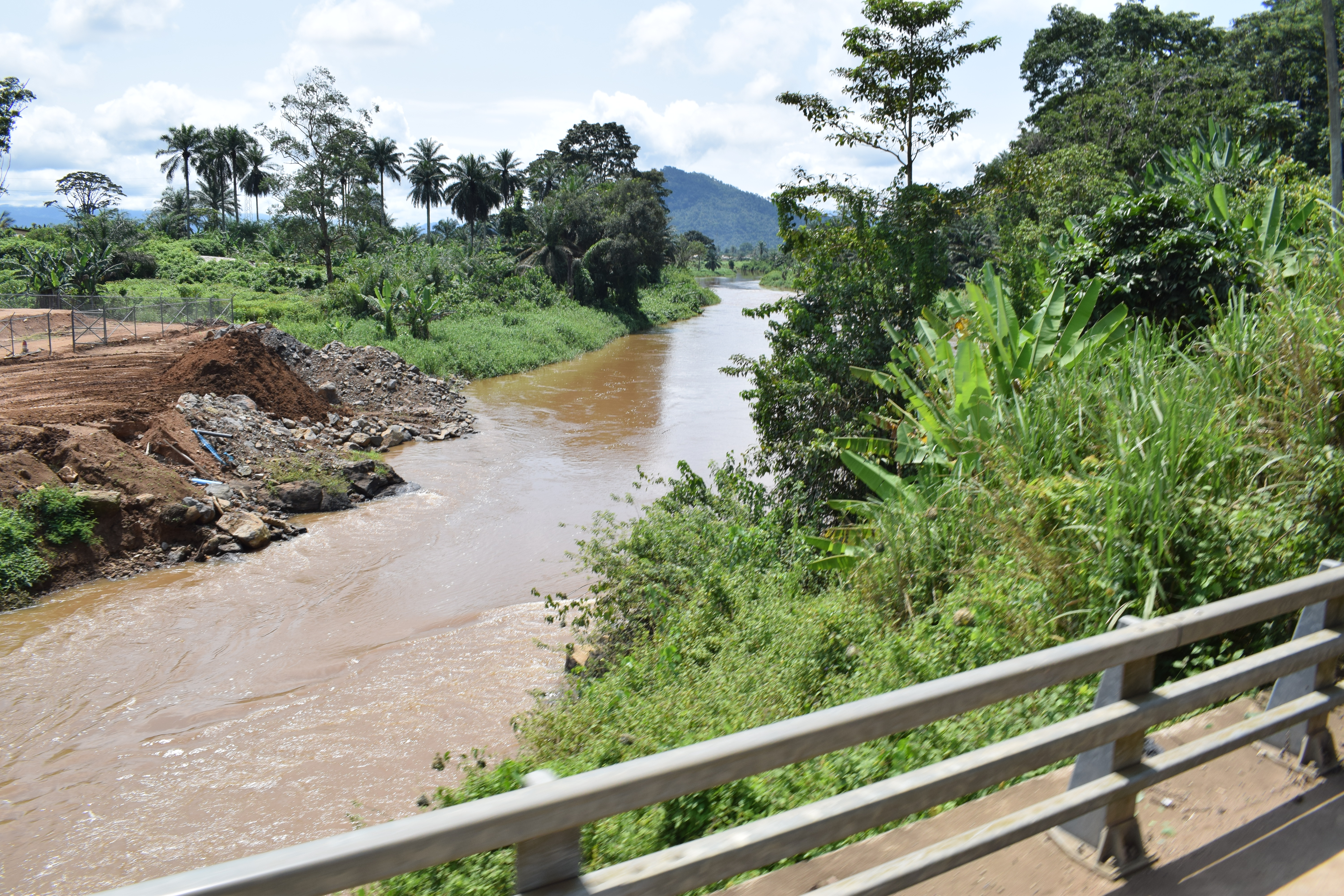
Nkam River

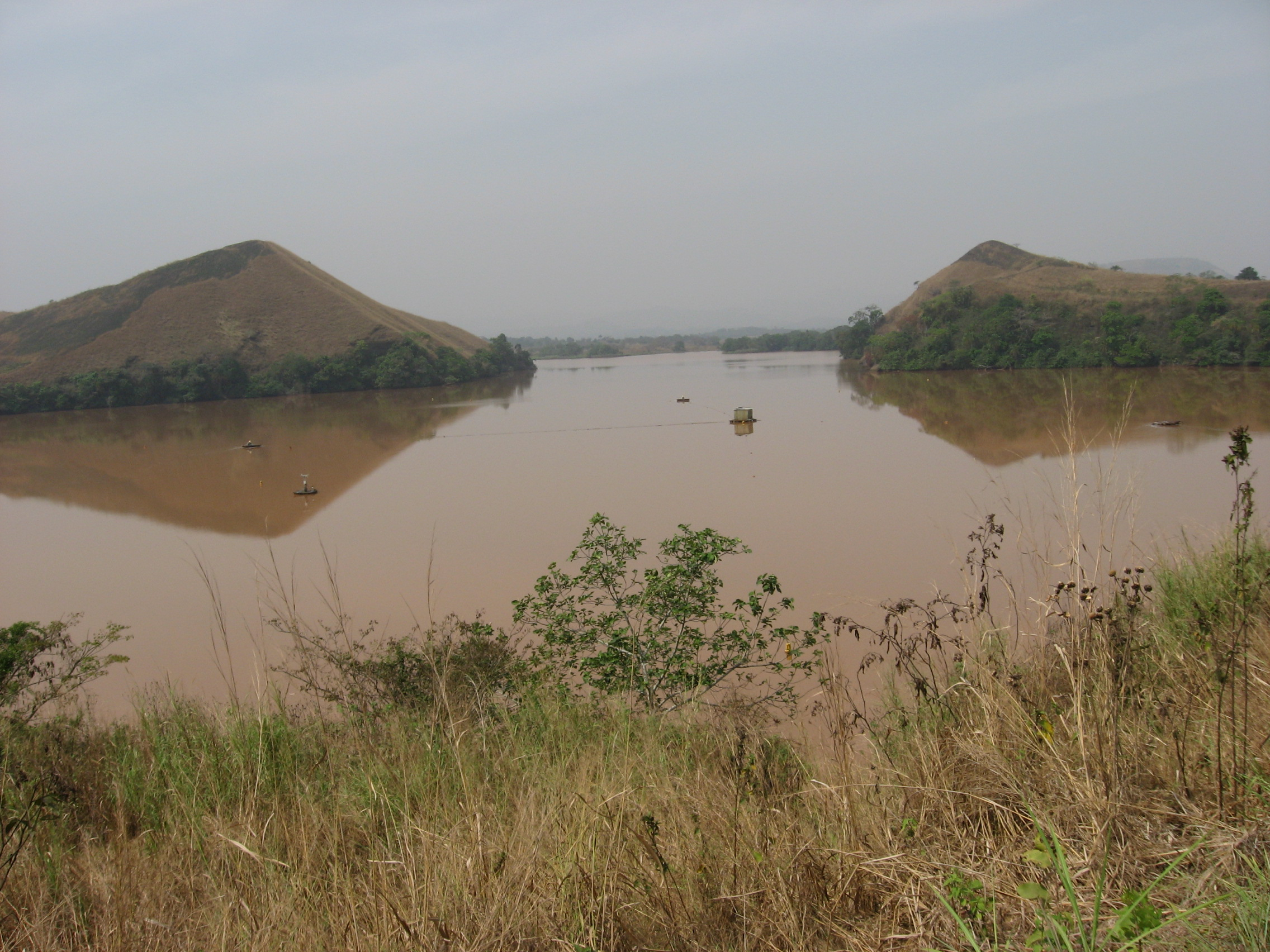
Lake Monoun

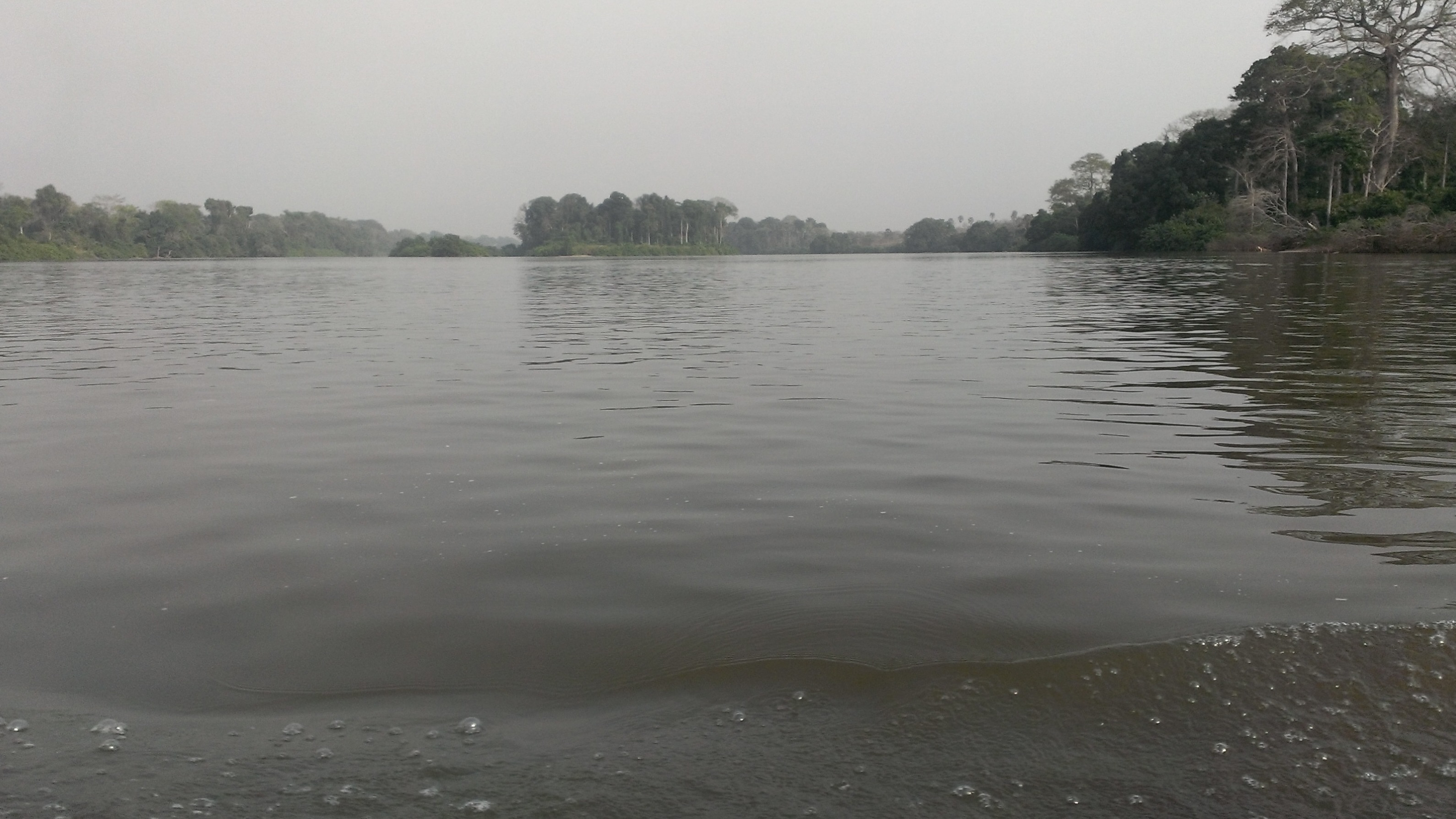
Mbam River

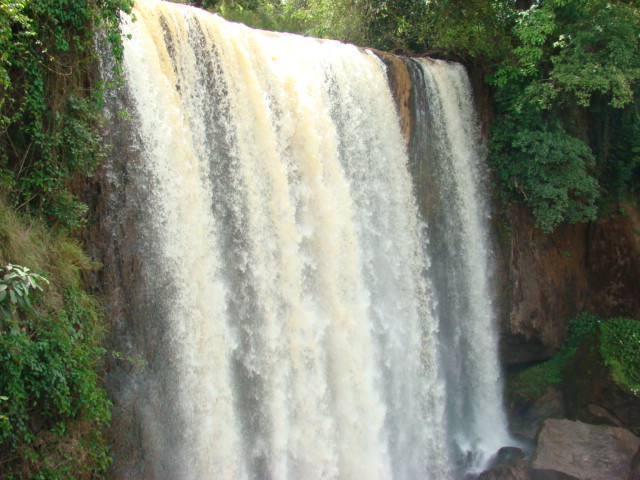
Metche falls

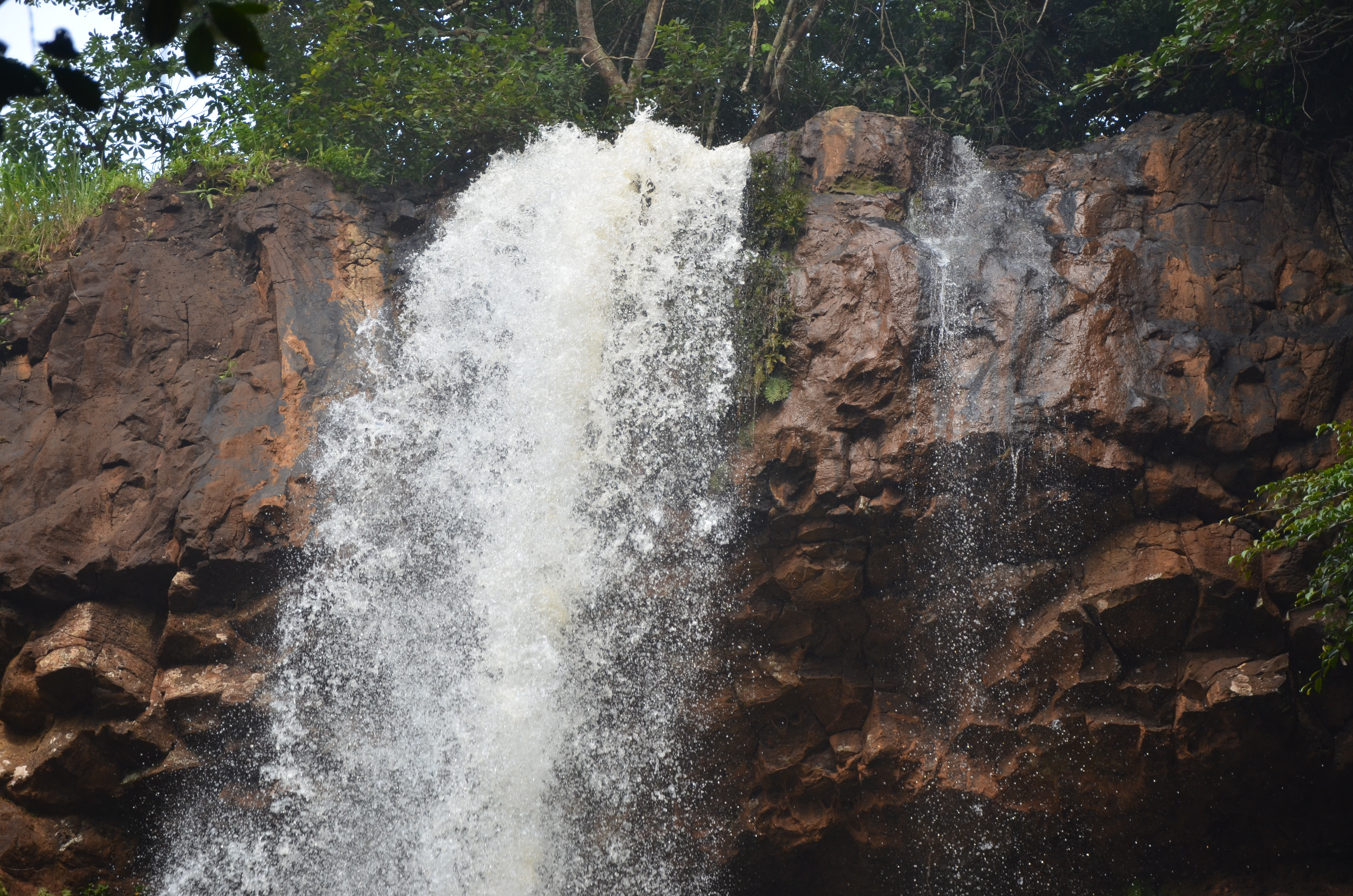
Bangoua Falls

=== Relief ===
The Bamboutos Mountains are the West's primary land feature. Elevations reach as high as 2,000 metres and dip as low as 500 metres in the Noun and Nkam valleys. The highest point is Mt. Bamboutos, a dormant volcano west of Mbouda, at 2,740 metres. These mountains lie along the Cameroon Fault, dating from the Cretaceous, which runs roughly parallel to the border with the Northwest Province and through the capital of Bafoussam. West of the Cameroon Mountains lies the Western High Plateau, with elevations of 1,000-2,500 metres. South of the fault, the land descends in steps until levelling off at the South Cameroon Plateau. Here, terrain is gentler, with large hills separated by deep valleys.

=== Climate ===
High elevations and moderate to high humidity give the West one of Cameroon's more pleasant climates. Temperatures average a cool 22°C, and rainfall is moderate. Except for the southeasternmost portions, the West experiences two major seasons in lieu of the traditional four: the year begins in a long, dry period of little rain, which runs until May, then the rains begin in May or June and last until October or November. Though the transition is gradual, the southeastern reaches of the province are part of the South Cameroon Plateau and thus have four seasons: the long dry season from December to March, the short rainy season from March to June, the short dry season from June to August, and the long rainy season from September to December.

The climate is equatorial of the Cameroon sub-variety in the northwestern third and equatorial of the Guinea type in the southeastern two-thirds. Rainfall, moderated by the mountains, averages 1,000-2,000 mm per year throughout, though it is highest at the area of the Bamendjing Reservoir.

=== Plant and animal life ===
Very little of the West's original flora or fauna survives, since most land has been cleared by human farmers. This is particularly evident on the Western High Plateau, where poor soil and less rainfall have exacerbated the effects of deforestation, turning the area into grassland. The Melap Reserve (Réserve de Melap) near Foumban is one heavily wooded area, but it is more of a city park than an actual reserve.

East of the Noun River, the terrain is primarily covered in woodland savanna of the Sahel type, which forms a transitional zone to the lowly vegetated northern provinces. West of that river, this savanna is of the Sudan type, and is interspersed among open, dry forest. A few small patches of rain forest persist to the west of the Mbam River in the Noun division. As elevation increases, forests thin out, until they are replaced by ferns and bamboos at 1,800 metres. Trees throughout shed their leaves during the dry season as protection against brush fires.

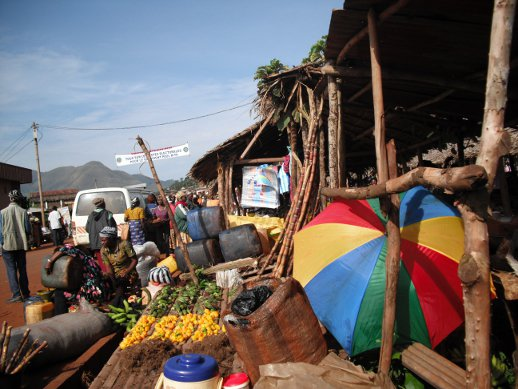
Bangou market

== Demographics ==
Historical population
Year	Pop.	±% p.a.
1976	1,035,597	—
1987	1,339,791	+2.37%
2005	1,720,047	+1.40%
2015	1,921,590	+1.11%

=== Settlement patterns ===
Bamileke dwellings, such as this one in Bandjoun, are typically separated by fences.

The West's population density is high in general, especially in the towns of Bafoussam, Dschang, Mbouda, and Bafang. This is due to the pleasant climate and fertile soils. Bafoussam is both the provincial capital and the centre of the Bamileke lands. Populations thin out toward the southern border and in the eastern Bamum-dominated territories. Settlements are scattered.

The region experiences significant out-migration, particularly when the vast plantations of the Southwest Province hire workers for annual harvests. Permanent emigration is mainly by those who wish to escape the overcrowded conditions and to farm larger pieces of land, and is directed mainly to the Southwest and Littoral Provinces.

Bamileke homes are traditionally made of dried earth placed on a bamboo frame and covered by a thatched roof. Farm plots separated by fences surround the typical home. Houses of this type are seldom seen today, however, though barns are still constructed using these methods. The last bastion of traditional architecture are the many chiefs' compounds that dot the province. These are characterized by their tall, conical roofs, bamboo and clay-brick walls, and carved poles around the entryway. The typical layout places a central audience chamber in front of other rooms for individuals of progressively lower rank.

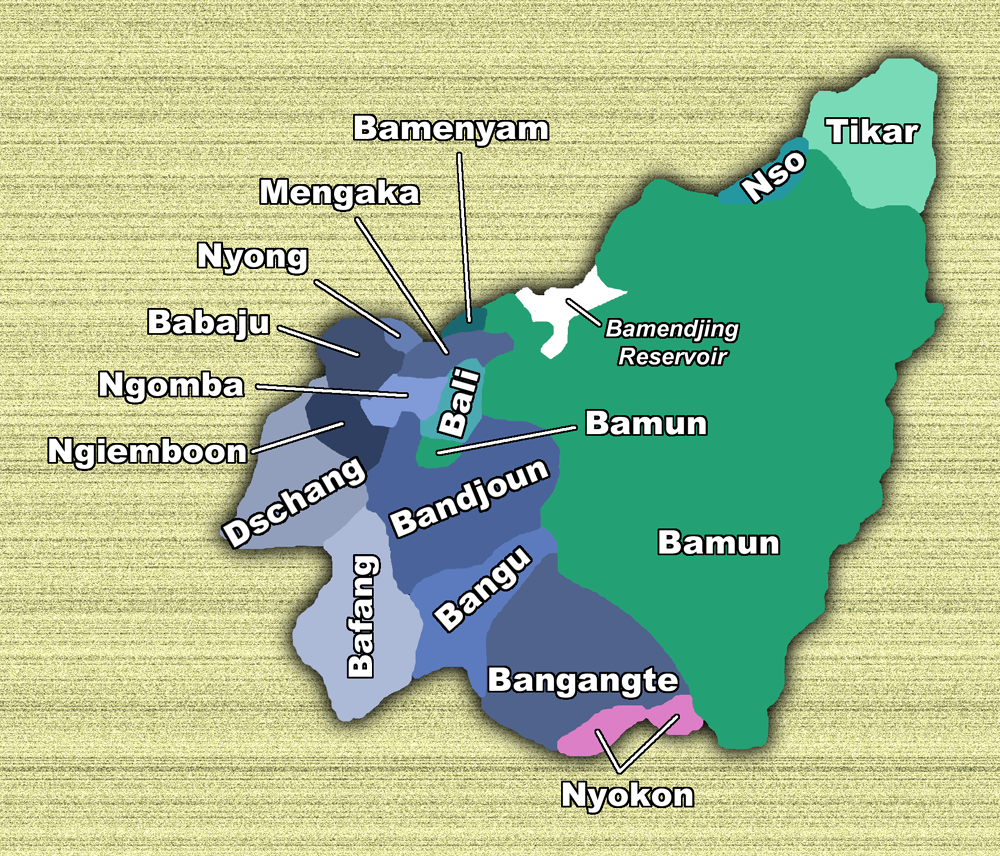
Territories of West Province ethnic groups

=== People ===
Two major tribal groups dominate the West: the Bamileke and the Bamum. Both of these are considered semi-Bantu or grassfields Bantu. The Bamileke are the more numerous, estimated to number 3 million or more. They are concentrated southeast of the Bamboutos Mountains and west of the Noun River. Their major settlements are at Bafoussam, Bandjoun, Bafang, Bawaju, Bangangté, Dschang, and Mbouda. They organise themselves in sub-groups, each under the rule of a different chief. Examples are the Fe'fe', Ghomala, Kwa', Medumba, Mengaka, Nda'nda', Ngomba, Ngombale, Ngiemboon, and Yemba. Most of these groups speak a unique language, though all are closely related. Most Bamileke are Christian, with Catholics in the majority.

The Bamum people are the area's other major ethnic group. They are a subgroup of the Tikar, though they speak a language called Bamum. They are primarily Islamic, and all are ruled by a sultan in their tribal capital, Foumban.

Other languages spoken in the province include Bamenyam, Mbo, and Tikar. Most educated inhabitants also speak French.

== Economy ==
The West is one of Cameroon's soundest economic areas due primarily to its agricultural prosperity and the enterprising traditions of the Bamileke people. In areas that do not have a daily market, market days are typically every eighth day (the Bamileke follow an eight-day week).

=== Agriculture ===
==== Subsistence farming ====
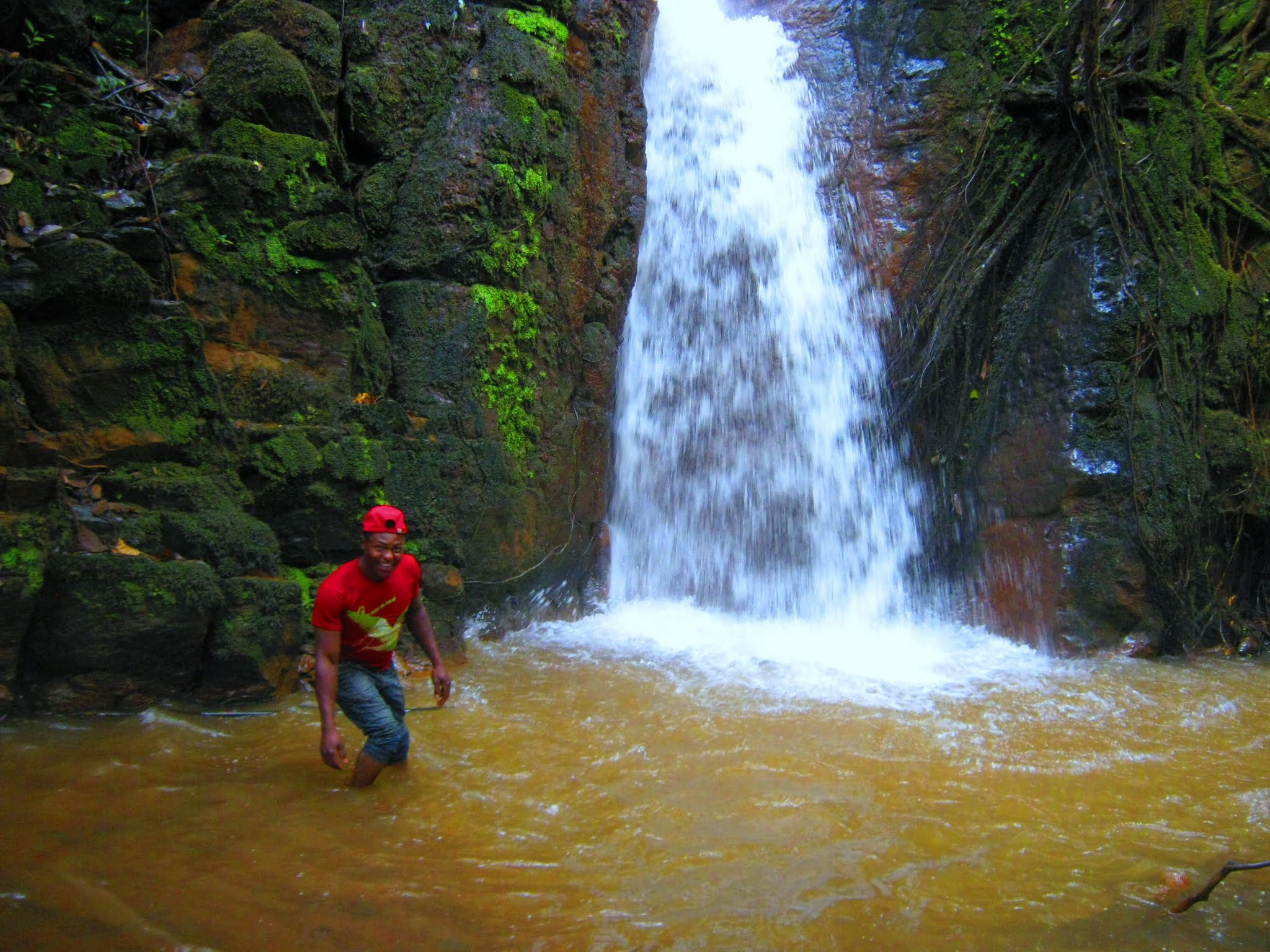
Les Chutes de Tchélépi, Bamougong

The Bamileke are skilled farmers who exploit virtually every strip of land available. Along with the neighbouring Northwest Province, the West supplies most of the food consumed in Cameroon's seven lower provinces. Tools are largely traditional. Farmers plant after the first rains in fields consisting of alternating ridges and furrows. In the past, farmers practiced field rotation, allowing land to lie fallow for two or three years. Due to increasing population density, however, they use the land almost continuously today; the loss in fertility is partially countered through extensive use of fertilisers and manure. Hedges or fences that separate private plots and keep out animals surround farms in the West. These hedges also provide firewood and help prevent soil erosion. In the Southeast, farmers sometimes place fields in forest clearings where they use slash-and-burn agriculture.

Maize is the major staple, and farmers surround rows of it with cocoyams, plantains, beans, groundnuts, melons, and yams. Potatoes are another mainstay, and the West is one of the few places in Cameroon where they grow well due to high elevations in the region. Farmers grow these crops on the hillsides and use the valleys to plant cocoyams, colocasia, and raffia palms. In the western Wouri valley, rice is also important.

==== Plantation agriculture ====
Population pressures prevent entrepreneurs from establishing large plantations more prevalently in the West. Coffee is the major cash crop, with large fields in the regions of Bafoussam, Foumbot, and Dschang and powerful supervision by Union des Cooperatives de Café Arabica de l'Ouest (UCCAO). Cocoa is also important, particularly in the lowlands. Tea is grown commercially near Dschang. Some rice cultivation takes place under the Upper Noun Development Company (UNVDA) in the southeast, largely due to government projects. Tobacco from Mbouda and Foumbot stays within the province for local consumption, though the Bastos Company of Yaoundé processes some for export.

==== Livestock ====
Livestock raising was once practiced more widely, but as populations have risen, most land has been converted to crop cultivation (a fact that has raised tensions between herders and farmers). Still, some herders drive cattle using transhumance methods in the northwestern half of the province, and the Kounden area is home to some modern ranching. Ranchers sell these animals, which account for 10% of Cameroon's beef, mostly in the Douala market.

Many farmers raise sheep and goats in the southeastern half of the province. Increasingly common these days are poultry and pigs, which can live in pens on smaller farms. In fact, the majority of Cameroon's pork comes from the region, and a large government-run poultry farm operates at Kounden. Smallholder farmers, especially women, keep domestic cavies in their homesteads that may provide more protein to family nutrition than any other meat source.

The Bamendjing is also the site of traditional fishing, and professional fisheries operate at Foumban.

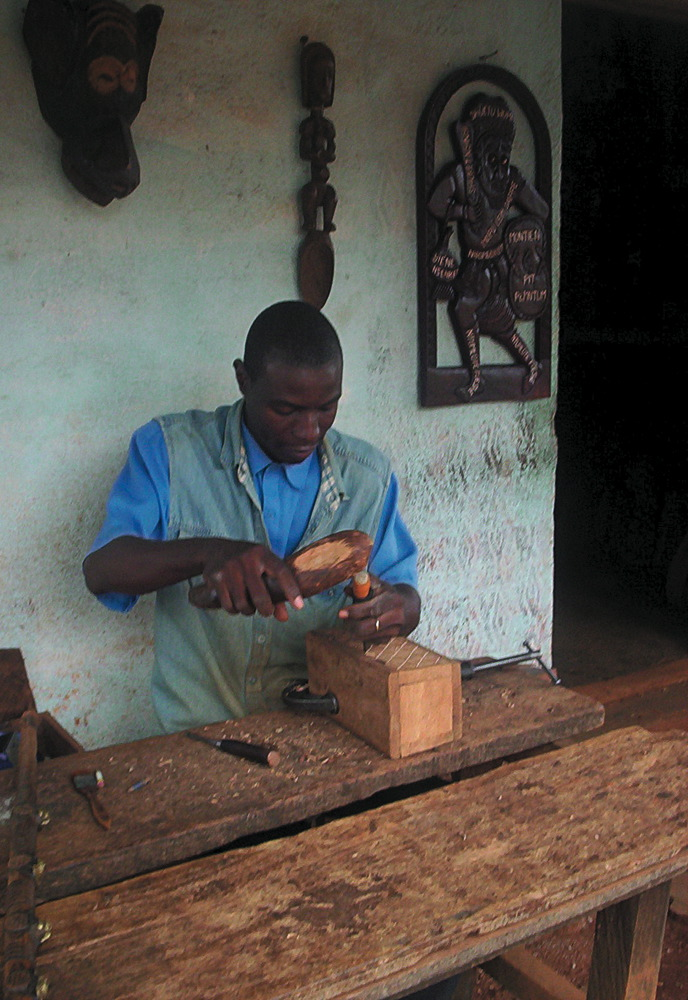
Bamum artisan at work in Foumban

=== Industry ===
The West is home to relatively little industry. The area's few factories are almost all devoted to food processing, with plants in Bafoussam (beer, instant coffee), Foumbot, Dschang, and Kékem. The building materials, pharmaceuticals, and bauxite mining industries also have a presence.

Arts and crafts form the heart of the West's production. Particularly renowned are the goods produced by Bamum cooperatives at Foumban. These include intricately decorated ceramics made from Foumban's high-quality clay, woodworking, brass and bronze casting, and cotton textiles, often featuring elaborate embroidery. The Bamileke are also skilled artisans, with their own cooperative at Bafoussam.

=== Transportation ===
With such a small land area and large network of mostly paved roads, the West is one of Cameroon's more accessible provinces. Major routes through the area include National Road 4 to Yaoundé, National Road 5 from Békoko to Bandjoun, and National Road 6 (dubbed la Transafricaine) from Ekok, Mamfe and Bamenda in the Northwest Province through Mbouda and Foumban to Banyo and beyond in the Adamawa. Bafoussam forms an important nexus between the cities of Bamenda, Douala, Yaoundé, and Foumban. Roads often must wind and sharply turn to traverse the region's mountains, and traffic accidents are not uncommon. The region is reachable by air via domestic airports at Bafoussam and Koutaba and an airstrip at Dschang.

=== Tourism ===
With its many artisans and its sultan's palace, Foumban forms the West's main tourist draw. Visitors also come to experience the region's scenery and traditional culture.

== Administration and social conditions ==
The West's high population and economic dominance lend it great political importance. However, Cameroon's government and state-run media, largely run by President Paul Biya's numerically inferior Beti-Pahuin tribal group, are often accused of anti-Bamileke bias. The Bamileke thus stand to gain a great deal from a more free and transparent government, and the West harbors many sympathisers for the presidential party's main opponents, the Social Democratic Front.

=== Government ===
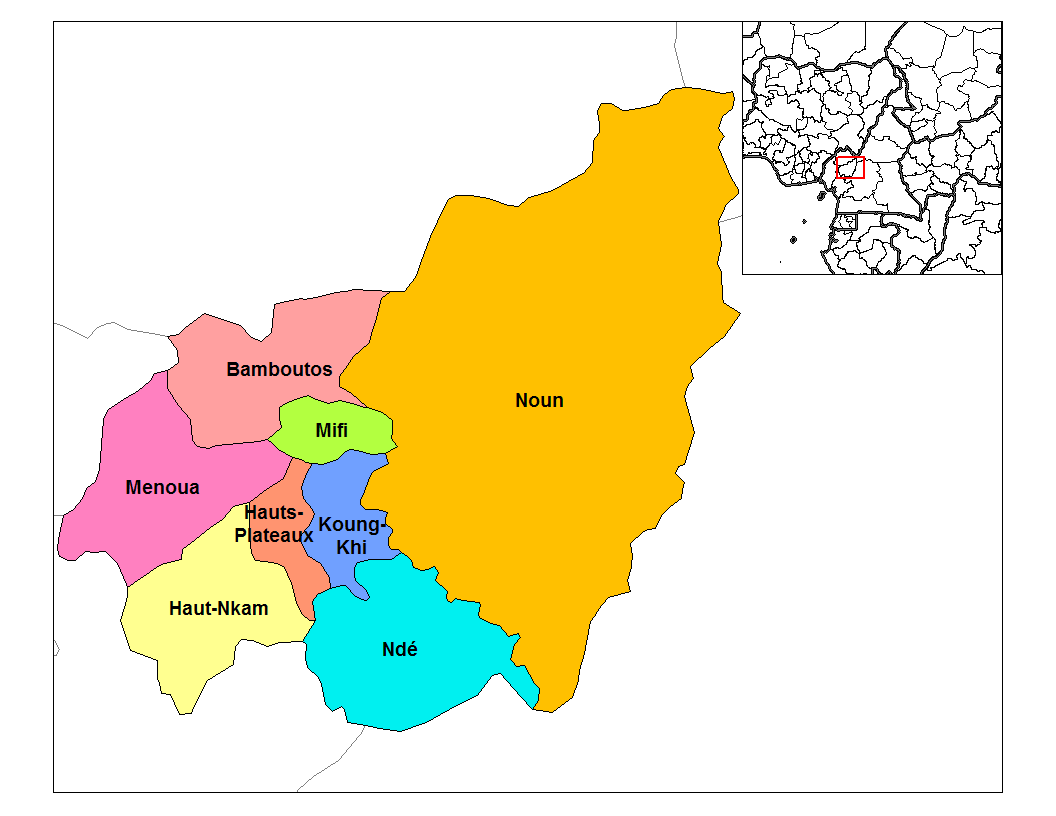
Divisions of West Cameroon

The West consists of eight divisions or departments (departements), each headed by a prefect (prefet), or senior divisional officer. The president appoints all of these officers and the provincial governor in Bafoussam. A special urban council presides over Bafoussam, staffed by presidentially appointed counselors who serve under a presidentially appointed delegate.

The departments are:

1. Noun
2. Ndé
3. Haut-Nkam
4. Ménoua
5. Mifi
6. Bamboutos
7. Hauts-Plateaux
8. Koung-Khi

The Noun department, headquartered at Foumban, is the largest division geographically and occupies most of the Bamum territories bordering the Adamawa and Centre Provinces. The Ndé department is southwest of this with its capital at Bangangté. The Haut-Nkam (Upper Nkam) department, whose capital is Bafang, is further west, and the Ménoua department borders it to the northwest with its capital at Dschang. The Mifi department, with its capital Bafoussam, forms the centre of the region, and it is hemmed in by a handful of smaller divisions: the Bamboutos department, headquartered at Mbouda, the Hauts-Plateaux (High Plateaus) department, governed from Baham, and the Koung-Khi department, governed from Bandjoun. These latter two divisions were recently formed due to population booms in the area.

==== Traditional political organisation ====
Traditional rulers still hold substantial power in the province. A sultan, whose palace and head of government are in Foumban, rules the Bamum. Bamum tradition claims an unbroken line of succession since 1394.

The Bamileke, in contrast, are divided into over 100 groups, each headed by a chief (fon, foyn, or fo). The chiefs are themselves divided into various ranks, with major rulers living in Bandjoun, Bafang, Bangangté, Dschang, and Mbouda. Traditionally, chiefs command divine powers and own all lands by divine mandate. Individual tenants work plots at their chief's behest. These groupings thus form the basis for Bamileke tribal identity. Advisers, often called the “Council of Notables”, in turn serve the chiefs. Below them are various district chiefs who govern individual wards in the village.

=== Education ===
With nearly 1,000 schools serving its some 1,000 villages, the West is relatively well provisioned educationally. The high population density contributes to classroom overcrowding, however. Students must often travel to nearby towns in order to pursue higher levels of education, since most villages do not have secondary schools. The province is also the location of a bilingual university at Dschang as well as the private Université des Montagnes in Bangangté.

=== Health ===
Hospitals and health clinics are fairly prevalent in the region. The area's pleasant climate keeps it largely mosquito-free, so malaria is not a problem as in much of the rest of Cameroon. Lack of sanitation is a serious issue, as this leads to outbreaks of dysentery, hepatitis A, typhoid, and other ailments, especially in the more urbanised centres.

=== Cultural life ===
The West has a lively traditional culture. The Bamum observe traditional Muslim holy days, such as Ramadan and the Feast of the Ram. They also hold an annual cultural festival called the Ngouon. Bamileke festivals vary from tribe to tribe, and most are held during the dry season or for special events such as funerals or the birth of twins. Some examples are the Macabo Festival of Bangoua, the Medumba Festival of Bangangté, and the Ben Skin Dance, a dance of female sensuality that has grown increasingly commercialised.

A number of museums celebrate the West's history and traditions. Among these are the Musée du Palais du Sultan Bamun, the Musée des Arts et des Traditions Bamoun, and the Musée Sacré Djissé, all in Foumban. The Musée de la Chefferie Bandjoun is the region's largest repository of Bamileke artifacts.

== History ==
=== Early population movements ===
Human beings have inhabited the West since prehistoric times, as evidenced by archaeological finds at Galima and Foumban. Bamileke groups likely entered the area from the Adamawa Plateau in the 17th century, probably fleeing Fulbe (Fula) slave raids. They originally settled in what is now Bamum territory, but the Bamum forced them across the Noun in a series of wars in the 18th century. Bamileke tradition states that they migrated in three major groups. The first consisted of the Baleng, Bapi, and Bafussam (who founded the settlement at Bafoussam along with the Bamougoum). Next came the Bagam, Bamendu, Bamsoa, Bazu, and Bangu. The final wave consisted of the Bati and Bafangwa. This period also saw the Bamileke assimilation of several older populations.

Bamum tradition claims their kingdom was founded when Ncharé Yen led them to settle at Foumban (Mfom-Ben) in the 15th century. However, most scholars today place this migration as late as the 19th century, likely the result of population pressures caused by the same Fulbe jihads that had earlier pushed the Bamileke south. The king Mbwe-Mbwe extended Bamum holdings from the Mbam to the Noun Rivers, subjugating numerous local rulers in the process. Mbwe-Mbwe also kept the Fulbe from encroaching further south and west.

The Bamum experienced a golden age of sorts under the leadership of Sultan Ibrahim Njoya (r. 1886–1933). Njoya was a patron of learning, and he converted to Islam under the tutelage of numerous Muslim scholars he had allowed into the kingdom. He developed an alphabet for the Bamum language (the Shumon script), and established schools to teach it. The Islamisation of the Bamum occurred during his reign.

The Bali-Chamba are the third major group to have pushed through the West Province territory in historical times. They came under the leadership of a warrior chief named Gawolbe and crossed the Noun around 1825. In 1830, they fought a war with the Bamileke Bafu-Fundong group near Dschang. Their leader, Gawolbe II, died and the tribe splintered as Gawolbe's seven sons fought for control. Most of these groups migrated further west into what is today the Northwest Province.

=== European contacts ===
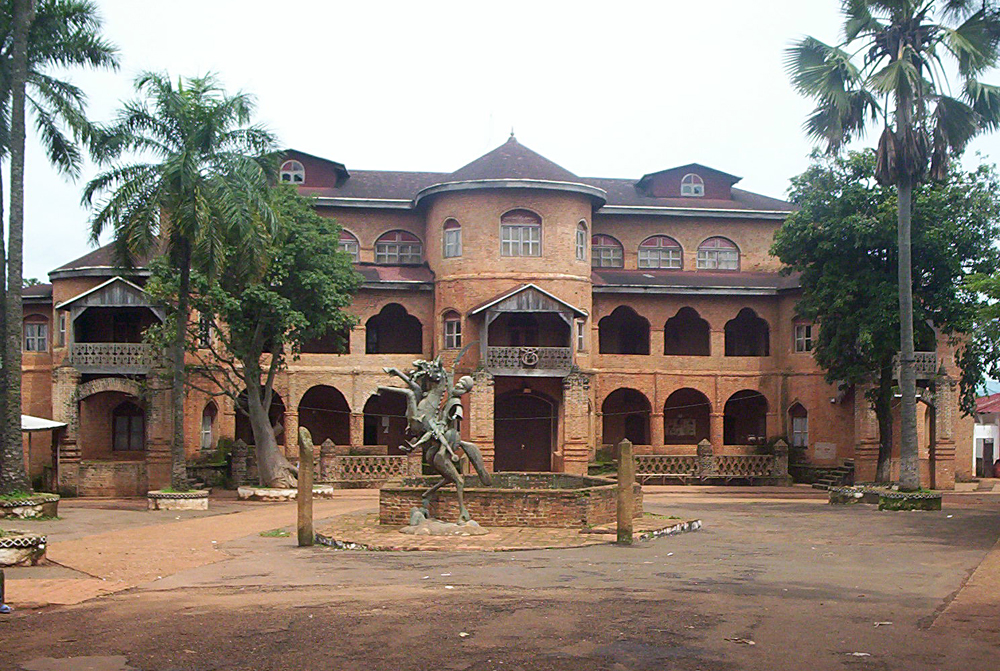
Ibrahim Njoya ordered the construction of the Bamum sultan's palace at Foumban.

=== German administration ===
The area had only indirect contact with European powers (mostly due to slave raids by tribes further south) before the German annexation of the Cameroons in 1884. The first Europeans to enter the territory were representatives of the Basel Mission in 1897. The Germans themselves did not move into the territory until 1899 (though they had signed treaties with Bamileke leaders as early as 1884). Governor Jesko Von Puttkamer established the Gesellschaft Nordwest-Kamerun to monopolise trade in the area, and he established the divisional capital at Dschang in 1903. The area's cool temperatures drew many German settlers, and the colonisers established great coffee plantations, which they forced the natives to work. Larger plantations were established further south, and many Bamileke were forced or encouraged to move out of their traditional territories to work them. The Germans also set up a puppet over-chief for all the Bamileke, who had never before considered themselves a single group. Catholic missionaries reached the grasslands area in 1910. By 1912, most of the Bamileke had converted to Christianity.

Sultan Njoya welcomed the first German emissary to the Bamum kingdom in 1902 after hearing of the ruthless treatment given rebellious tribes further to the northwest. He even lent military support for the German campaign against the Nso near Bamenda in 1906. The Bamum soldiers, eager for revenge for an earlier defeat to the Nso in 1888, committed such atrocities that the Germans sent them back. Njoya also ordered the building of a palace at Foumban in 1917, which he modeled after that of the German governor.

=== French administration ===
Bamileke and Bamum territory fell to the French in 1916 after the Germans' defeat in World War I. The territory became part of the Baré-Foumban-Nkongsamba administrative area, and the capital was moved to Foumban. Dschang served as the seat of a French-run school for the sons of chiefs, which the French used to indoctrinate as well as instruct. The French maintained German plantations and labour sources, and new operations sprang up, such as a palm plantation at Dschang. The new colonial overlords made improvements to the region's infrastructure, as well, especially to the road network.

The French continued Germany's policy of propping up sympathetic chiefs and deposing recalcitrant ones. They sought some sort of administrative centre amid the Bamileke domains, and in 1926, Fotso II of the Bandjoun people offered the site of Bafoussam, neighbouring his domains but not actually part of them. Mambou, chief of the area, opposed the colonials, but he was defeated, and the foundations of modern Bafoussam were laid. The Bamum did not escape the French sphere, either, as sultan Ibrahim Njoya was deposed in 1931 due to his pro-German views. Njoya died in a Yaoundé prison two years later.

After World War II, the West was a centre of political pressure and protest against colonial rule. Other groups came into being to combat these (usually with France's blessing), including the Union Bamiléké in 1948. In 1956, France granted self-rule to its colony, and the West proved one of Cameroon's more politically influential areas due to groups such as Paysans Independants and the Assemblée Traditionnale Bamoun. The population boomed between 1958 and 1965, a period of high urbanisation in Cameroon.

In 1958, Ahmadou Ahidjo became prime minister of French Cameroon with a pro-independence platform. The powerful Union des Populations du Cameroun (UPC) party, including many Bamileke, considered him a French puppet and opposed him. On 27 June 1959, several Bamileke areas were struck in what were later labeled terrorist strikes. Ahidjo declared martial law. His later attitudes toward the Bamileke likely were strongly influenced by their opposition to him.

=== Post-independence ===
Under Ahidjo, the current West Province was known as the Administrative Inspectorate of the West. He named Bafoussam the capital and set the province's current boundaries after union of British and French Cameroon in 1972.

Ahidjo's battles with the UPC continued past Cameroon's independence on 1 January 1960. He outlawed the party's "terrorist" wing on 30 October 1963, leading to more strikes in Bamileke population centres and subsequent military retribution.

What support Ahidjo did enjoy among the Bamileke largely came from his pro-business policies. When the president resigned in 1982, his replacement, Paul Biya, sent his representative, Moussa Yaya, to reassure the West's businessmen that he would not prove unfriendly to their interests. Yaya mistrusted Biya, however, and only exacerbated Bamileke reservations. The Bamum, as well, were reluctant to see Cameroon's presidency change from a Muslim to a Christian. Much Bamileke and Bamum resentment for the Biya administration dates to this period.

In 2008, the President of the Republic of Cameroon, Paul Biya, signed decrees abolishing "Provinces" and replacing them with "Regions". Hence, all of the country's ten provinces are now known as Regions.

== Culture ==
=== Traditional dance accessories ===
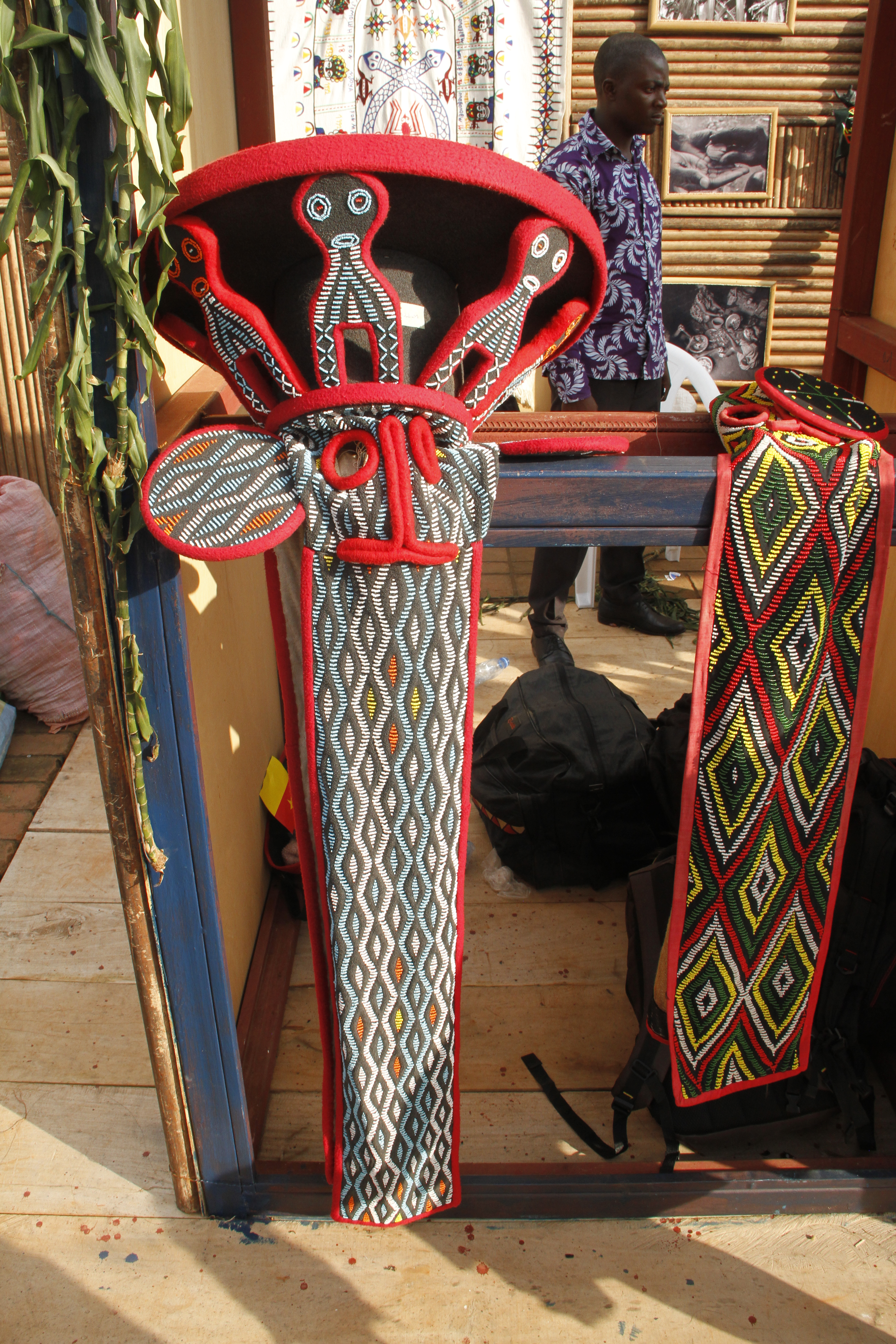
Mask

=== Traditional Dances ===
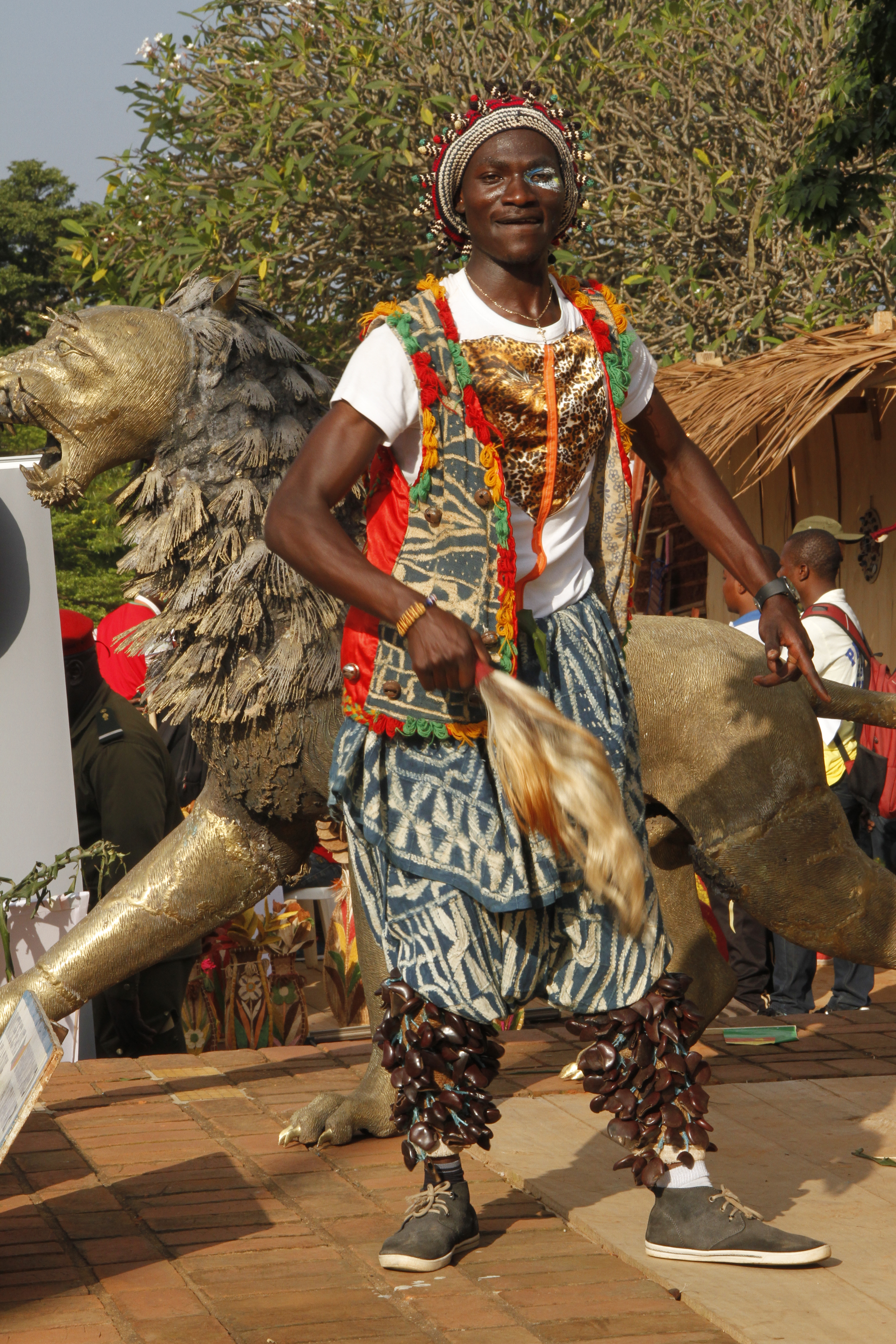

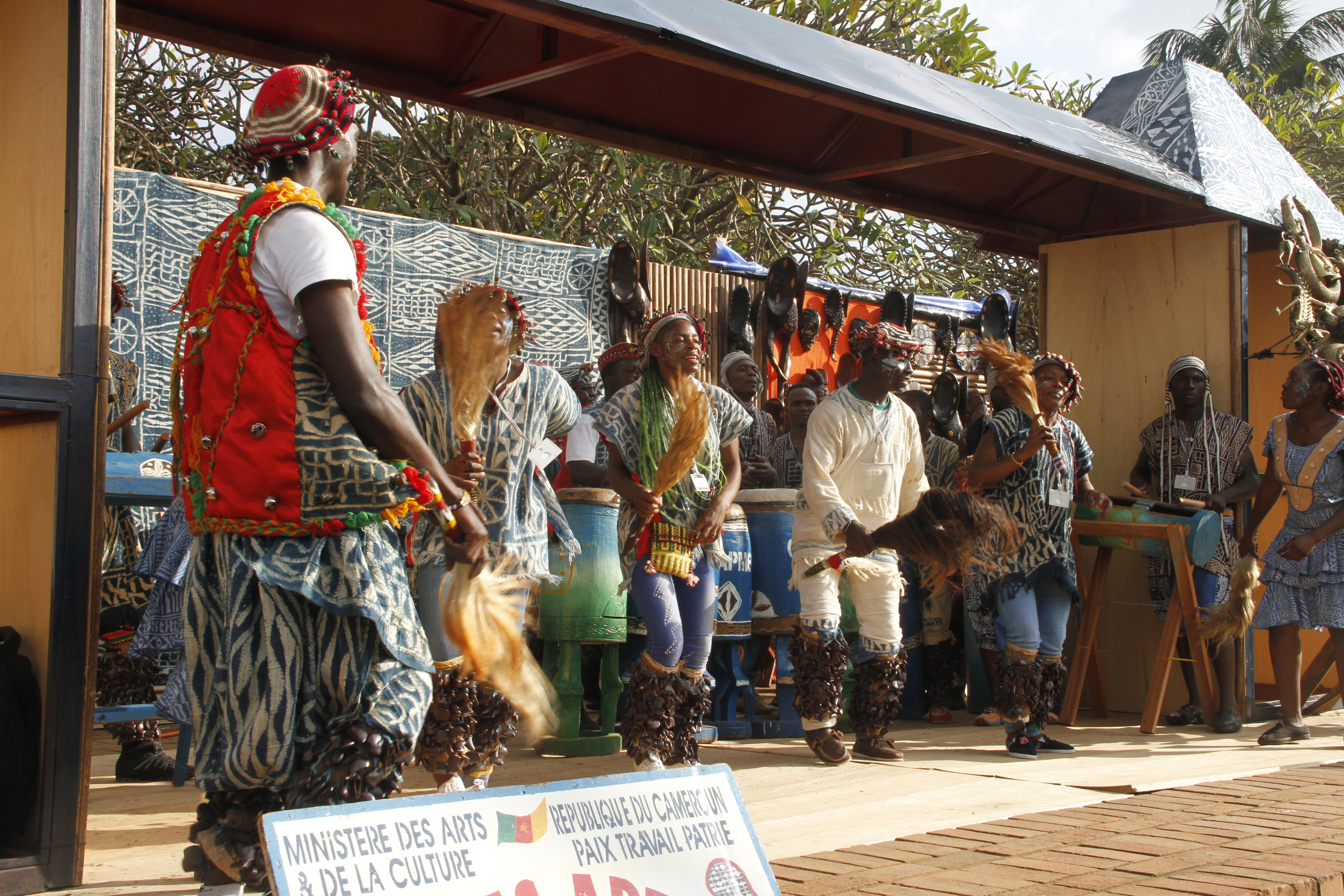

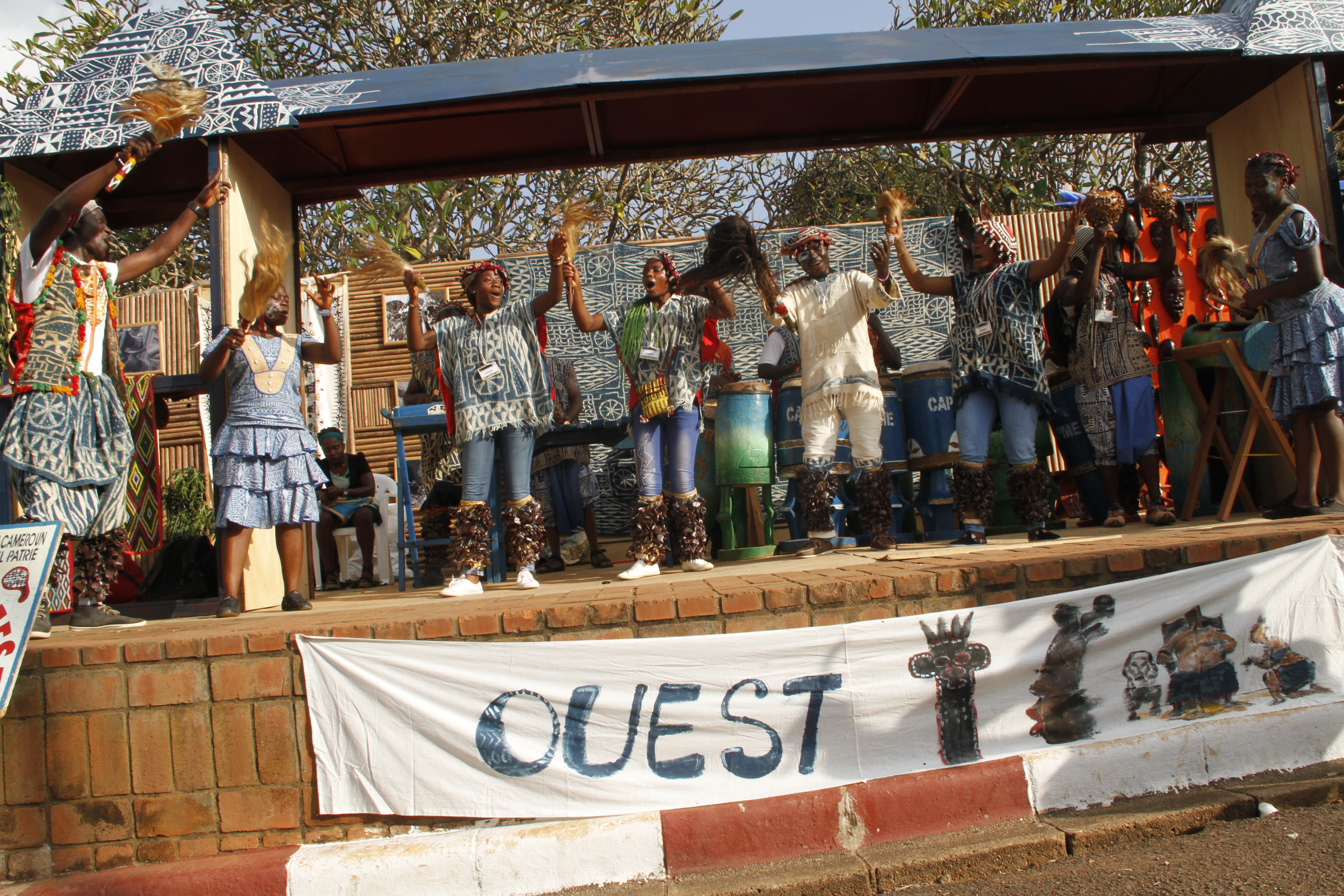

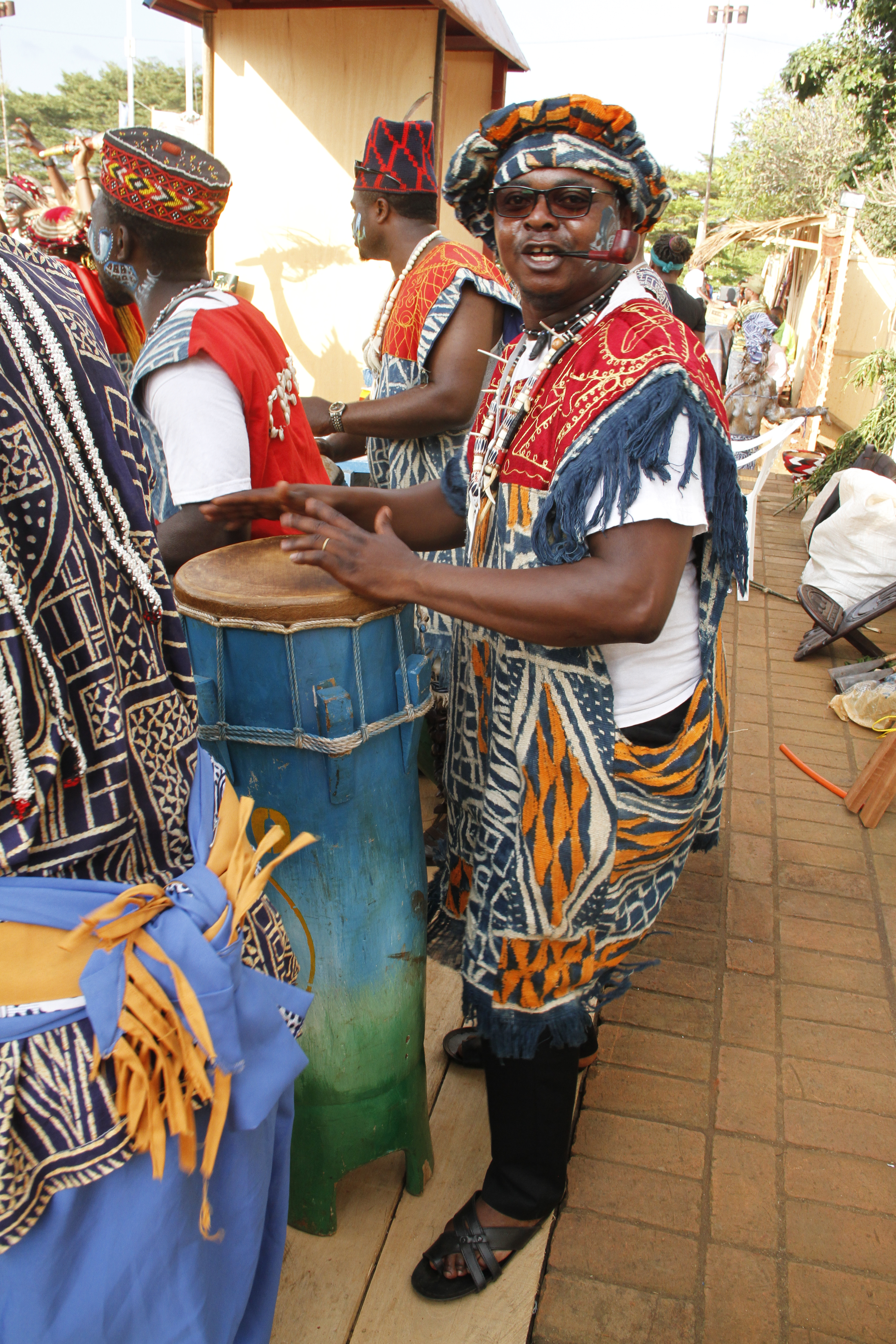
Tam-Tam Player

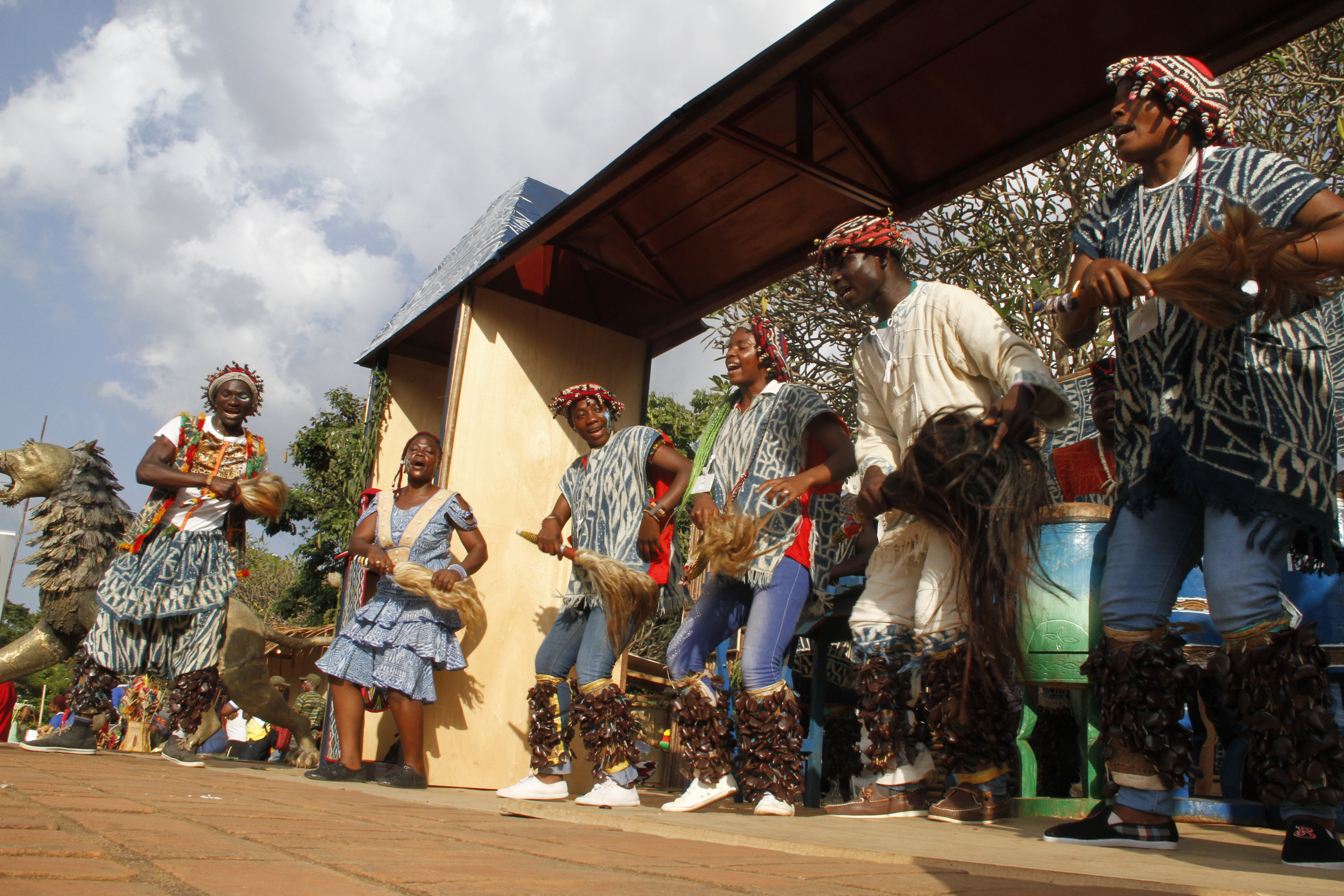

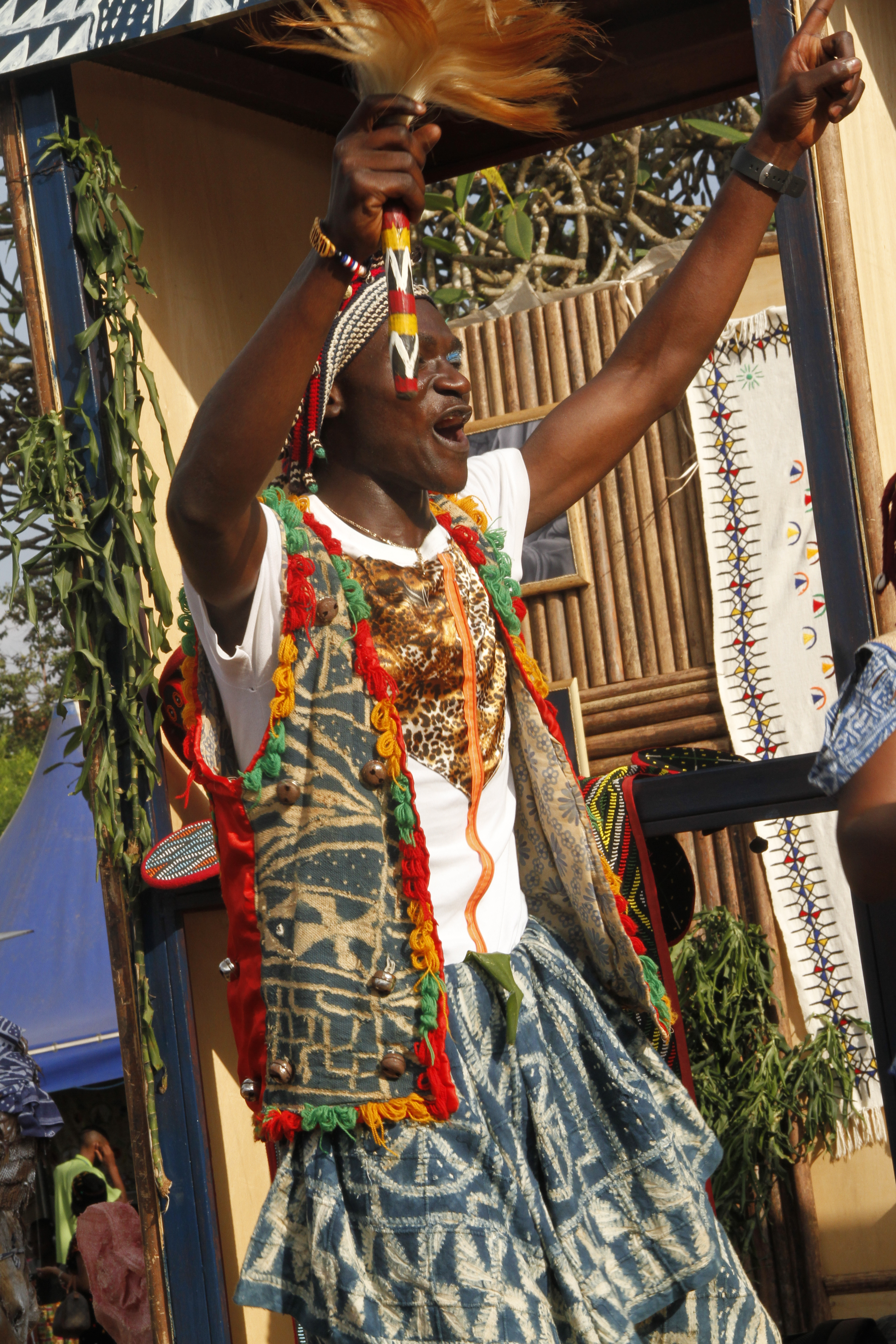

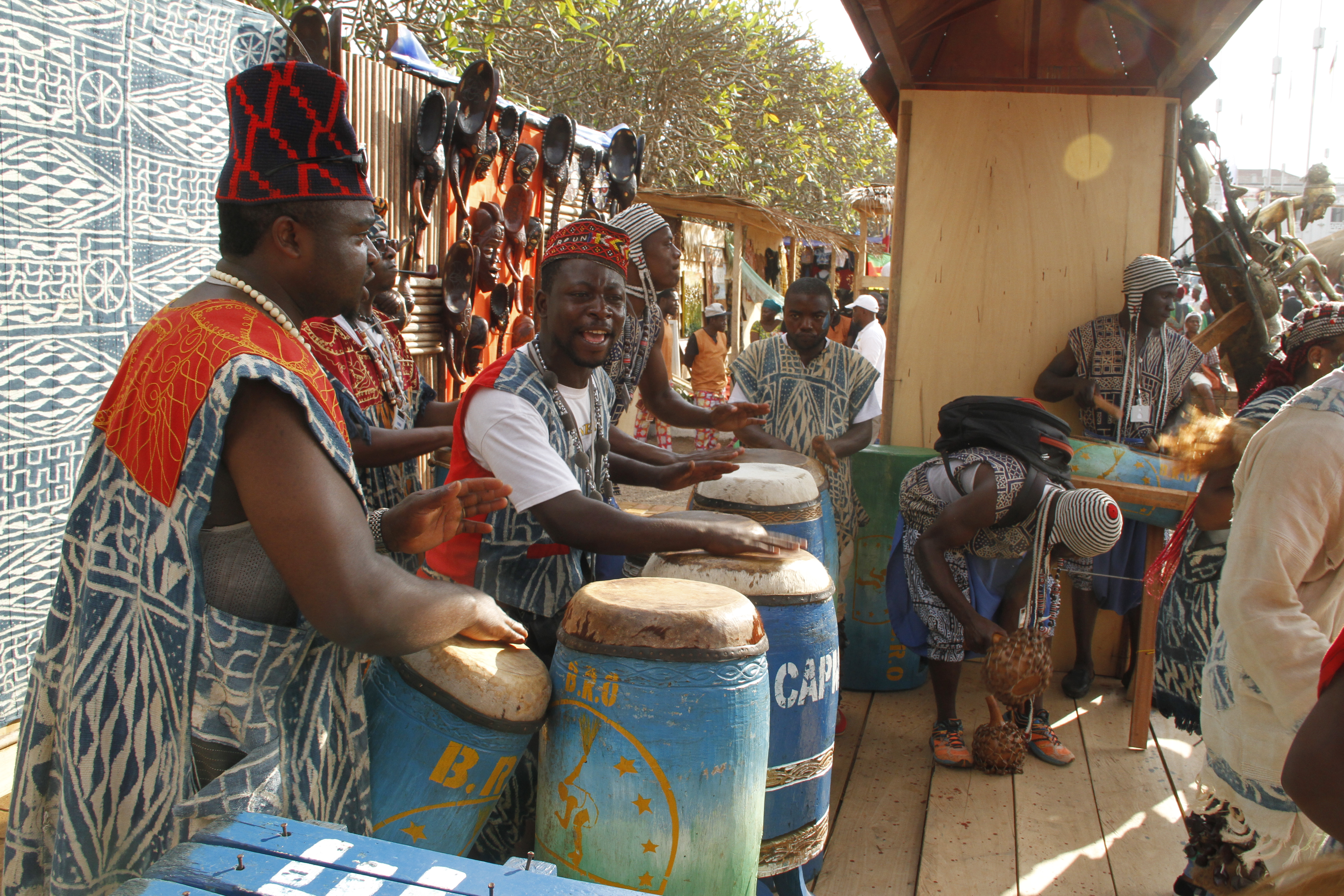
Tam-tam group players

=== Traditional musical instruments ===
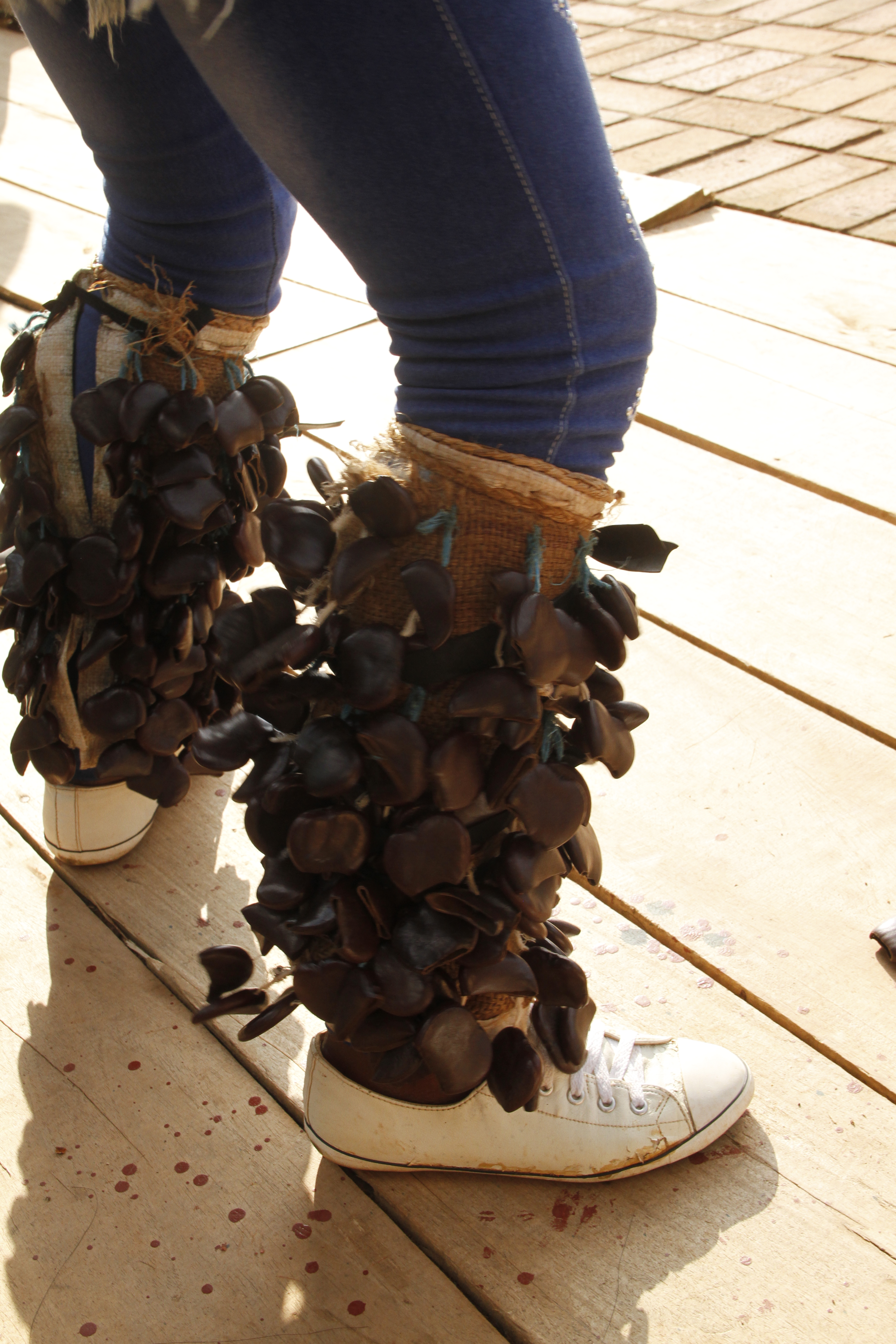
Bamileke cowbells

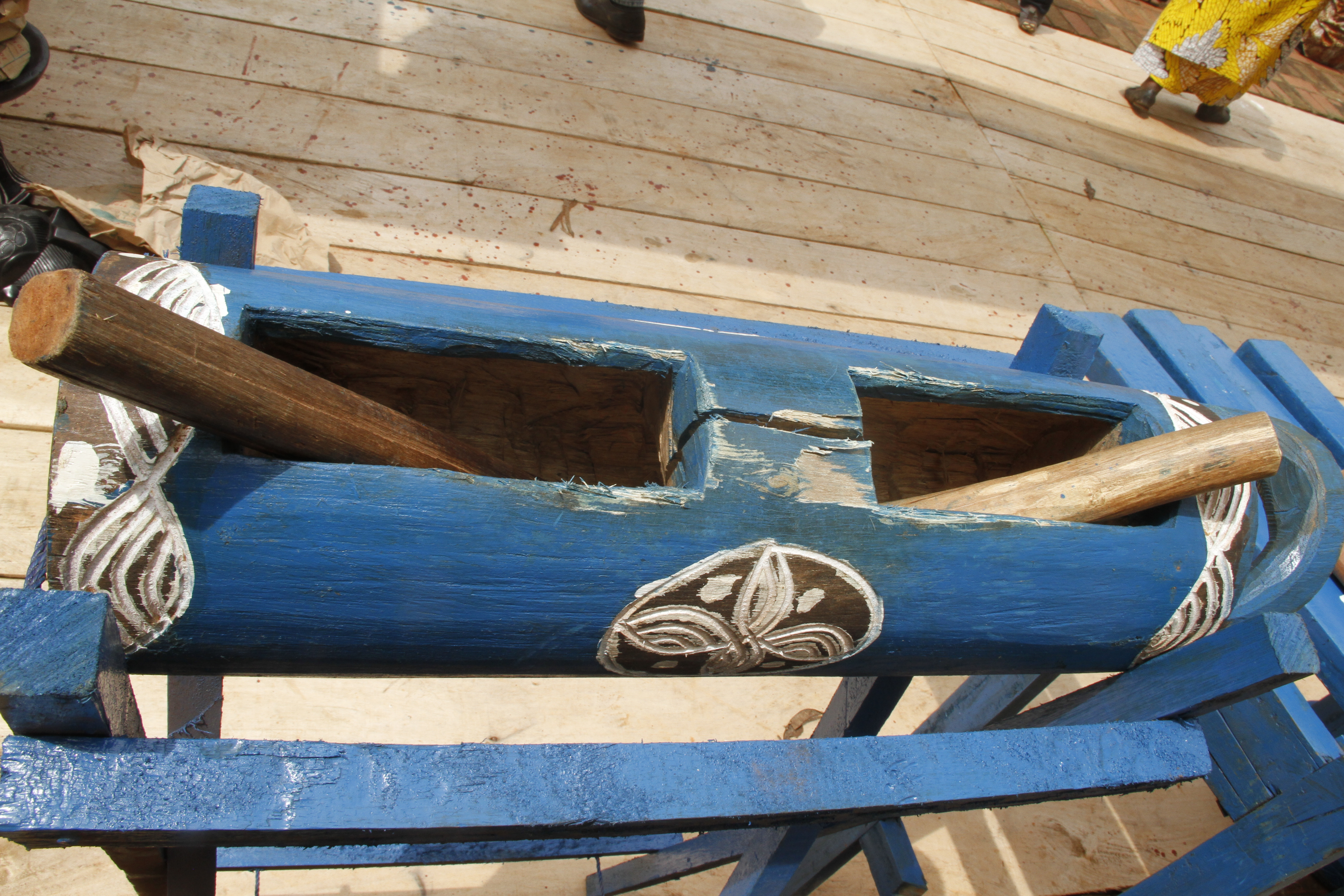
Balafon

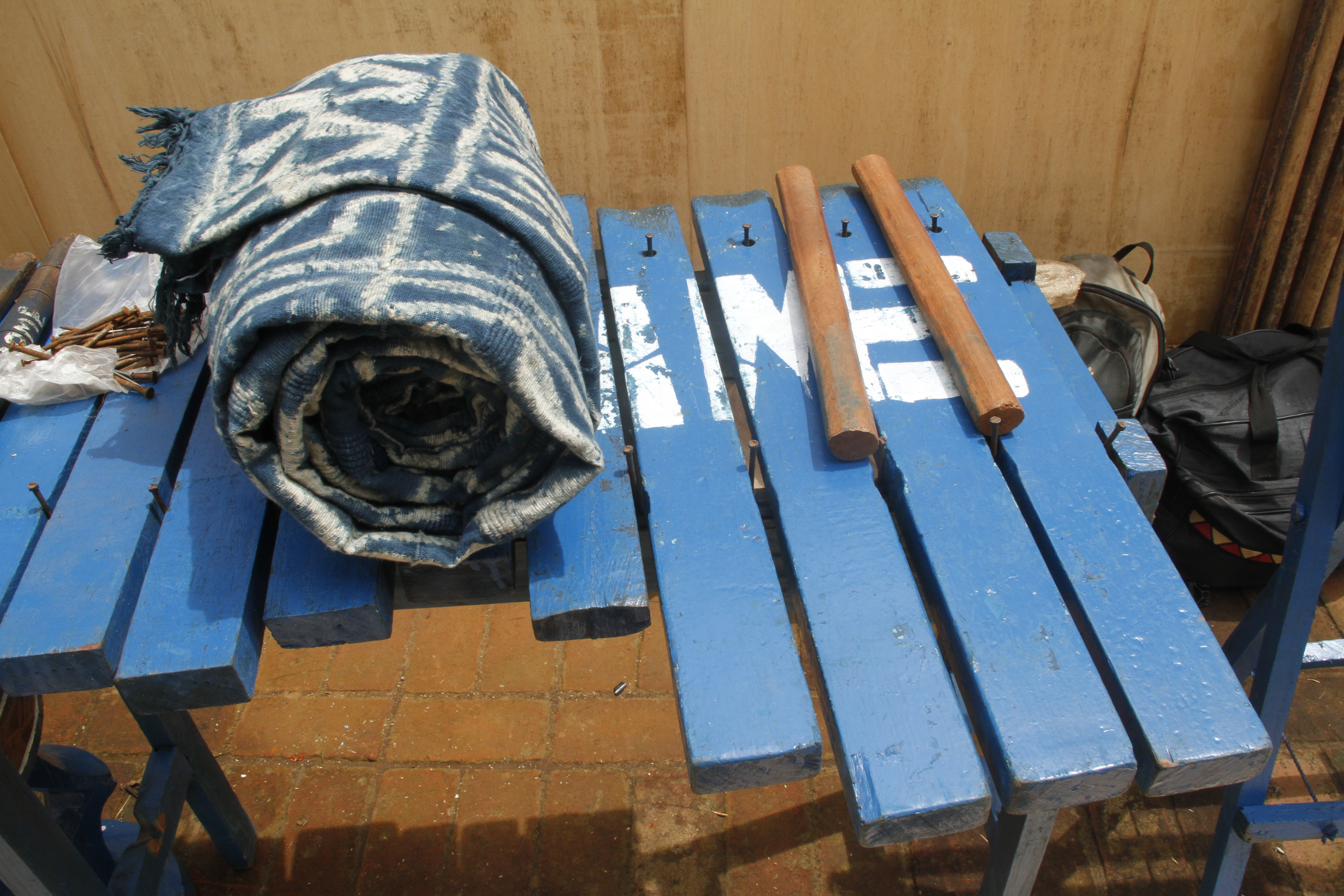
Another balafon

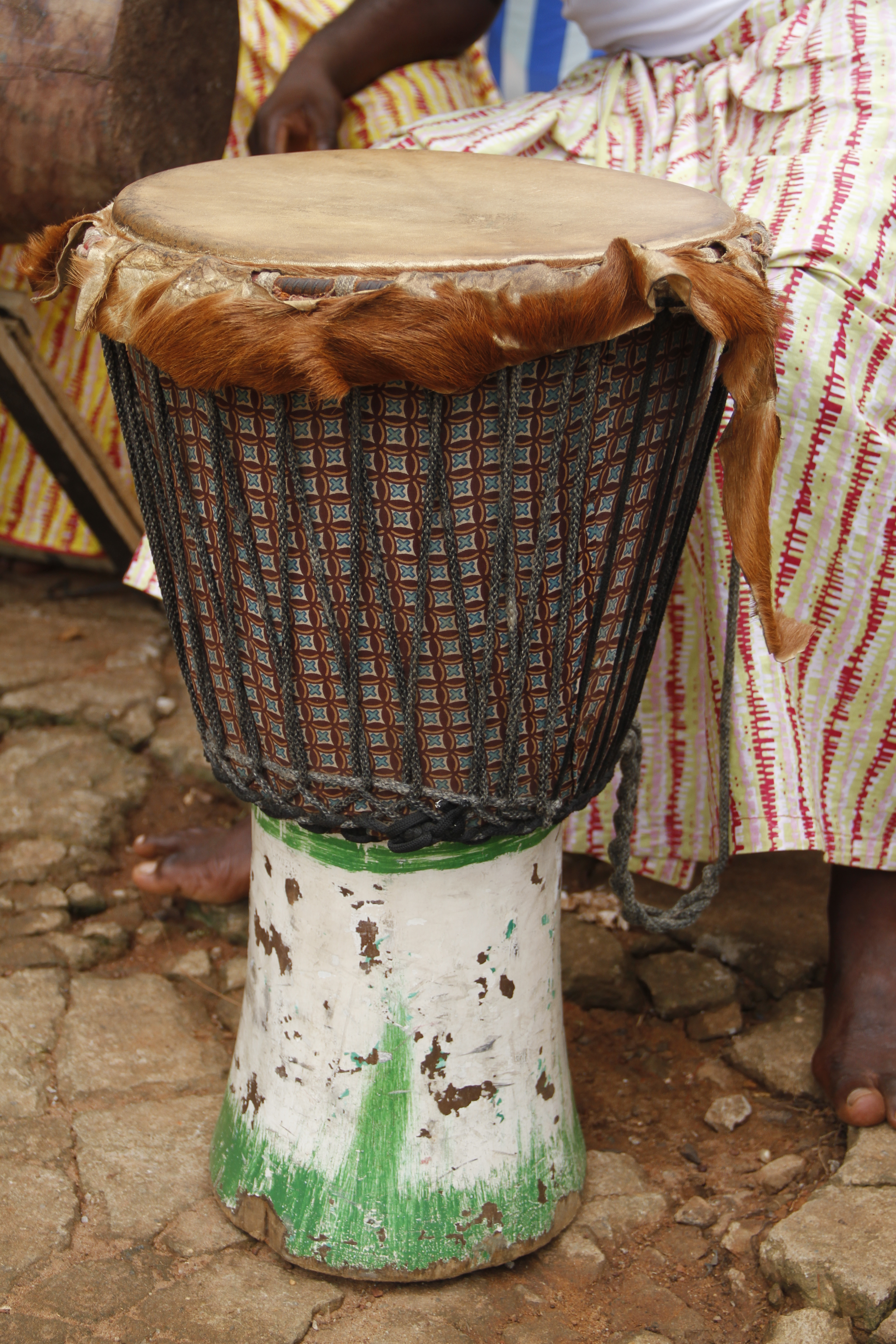
Tam-tam

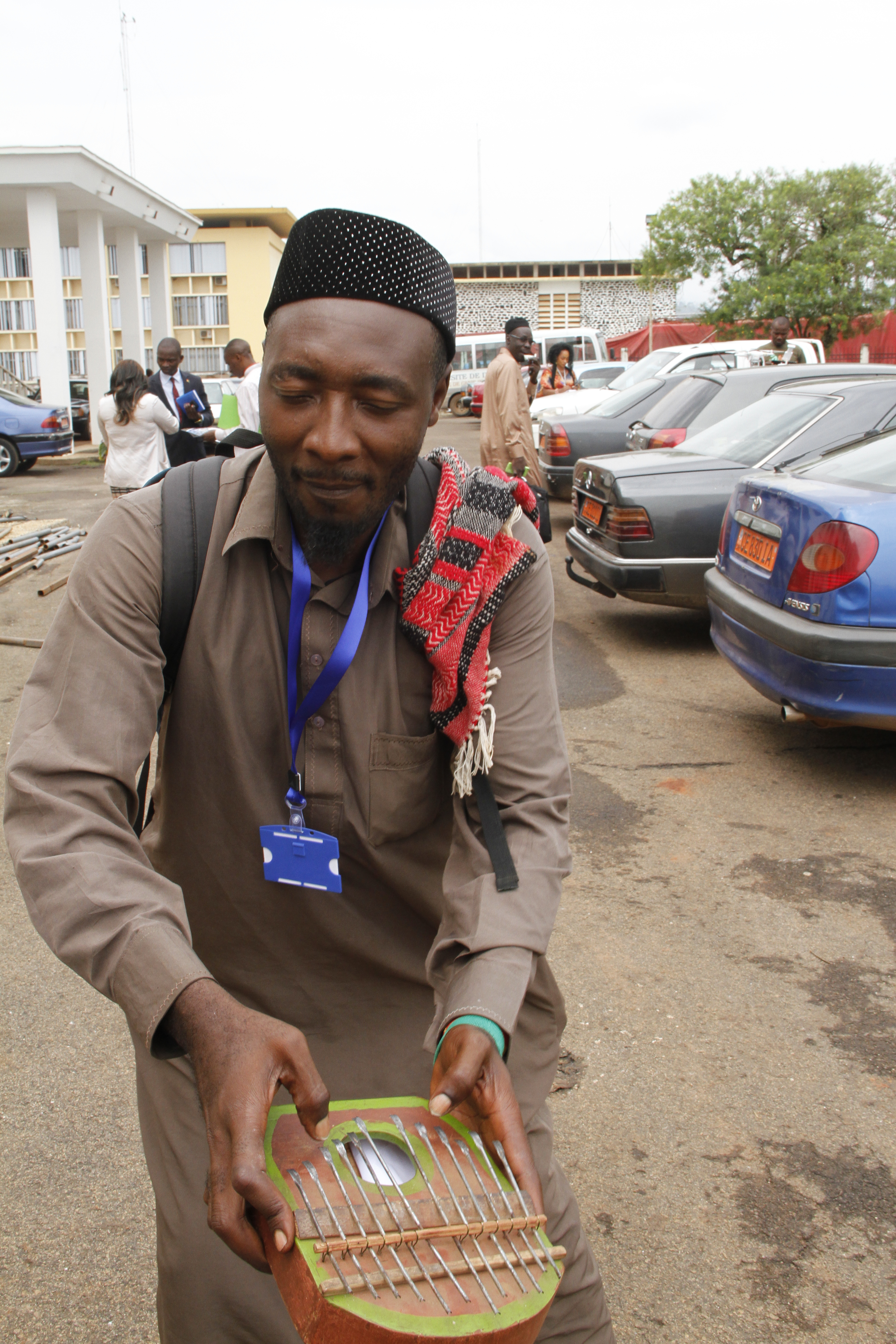
Sanza

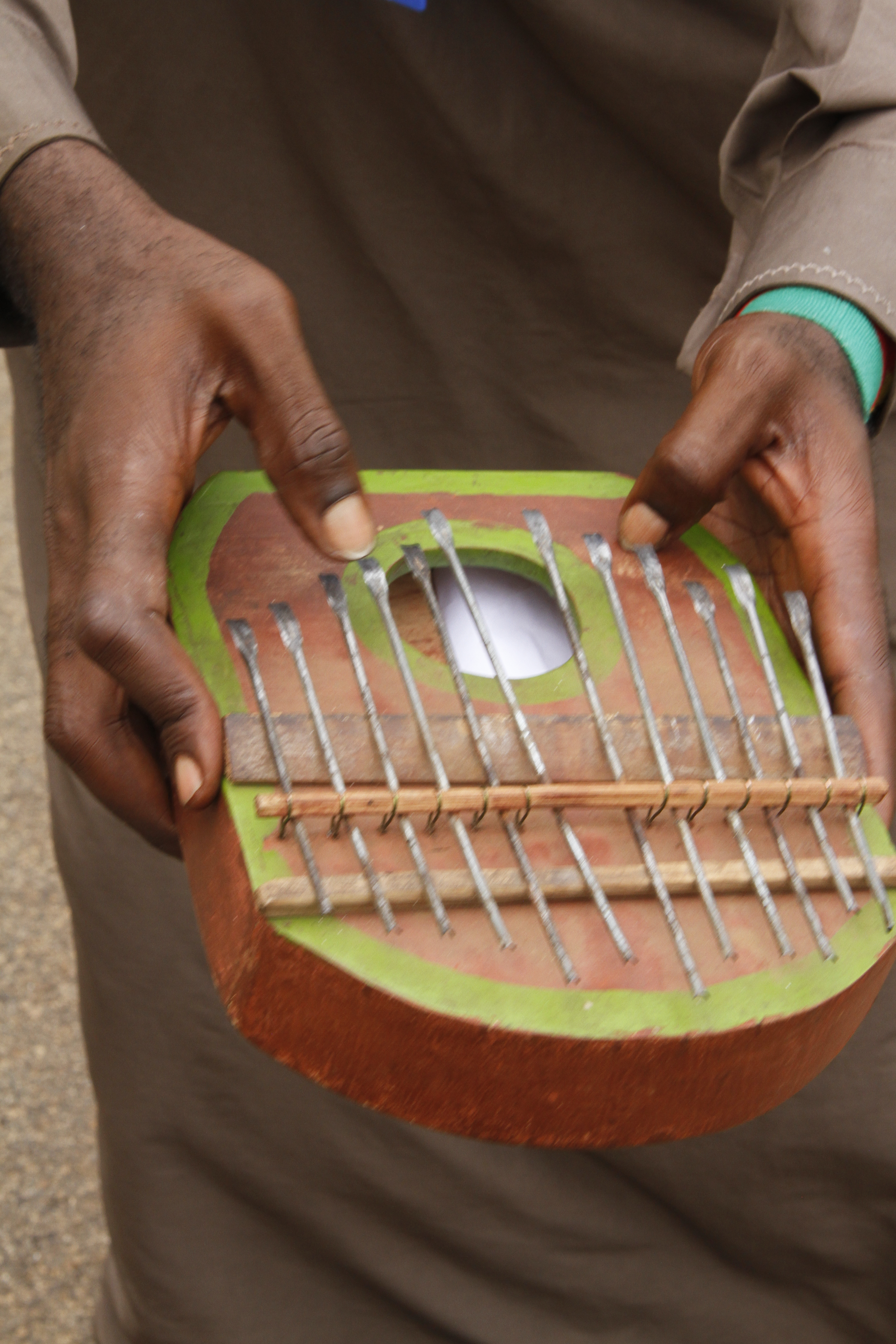
Sanza

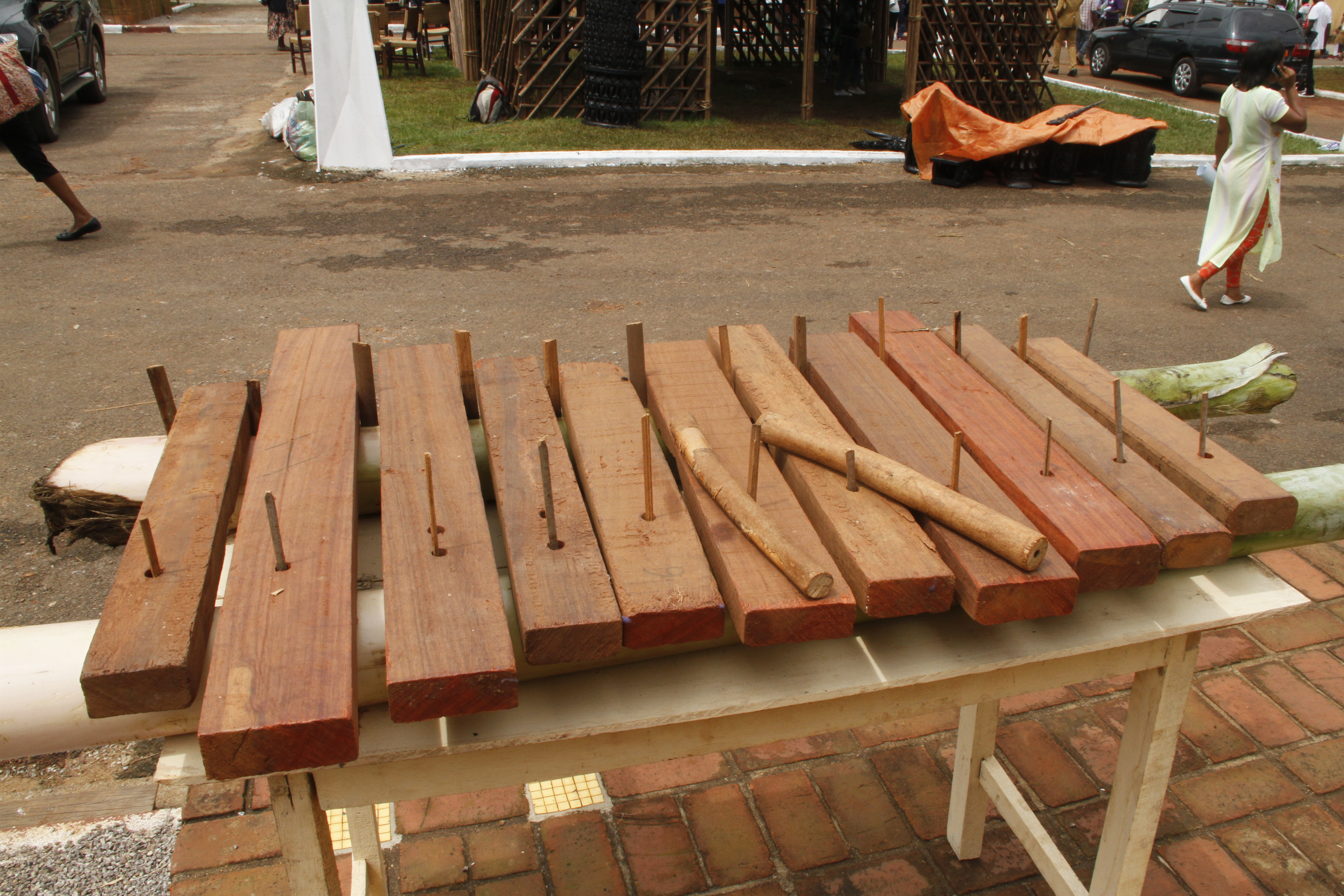
Balafon

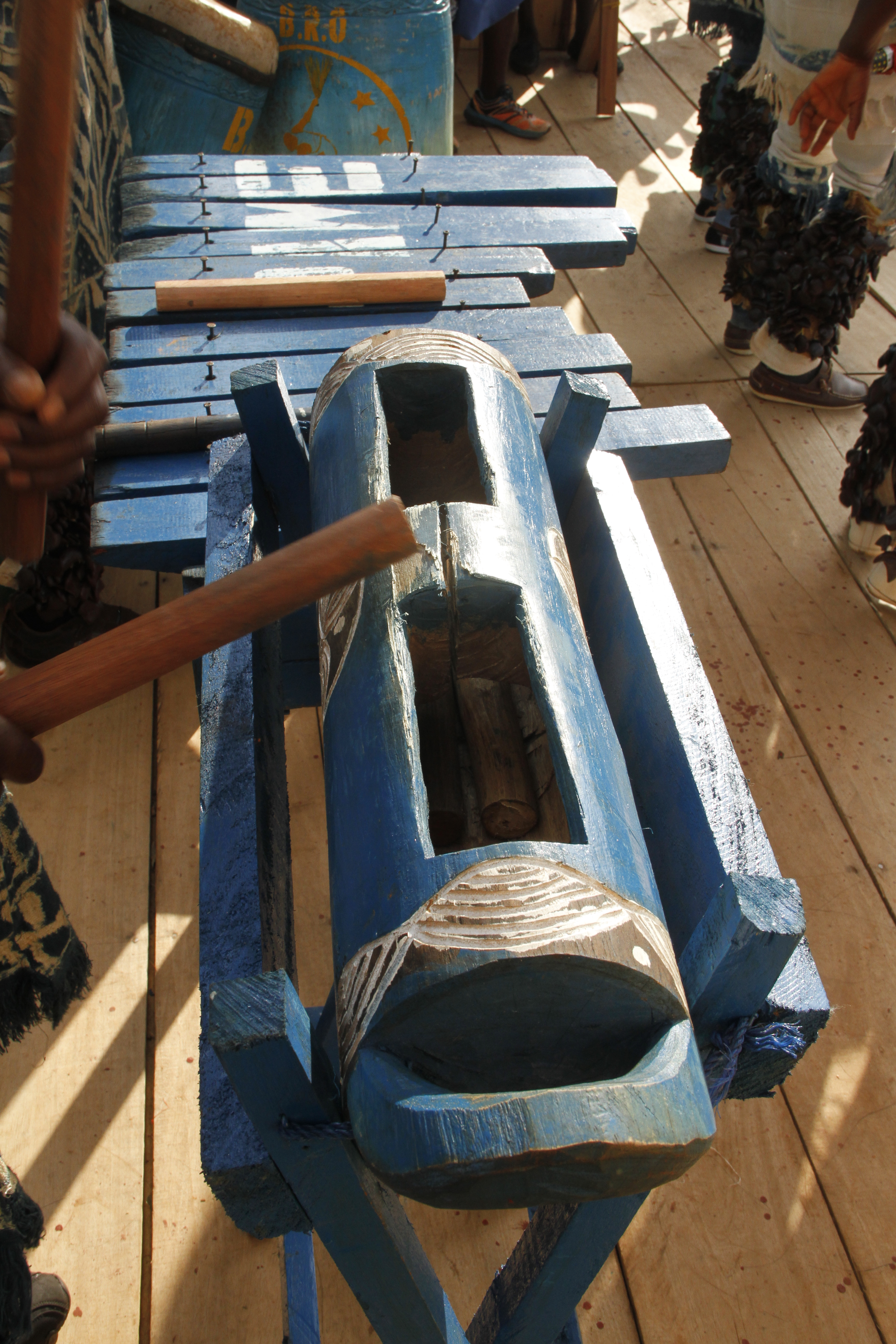
Balafon

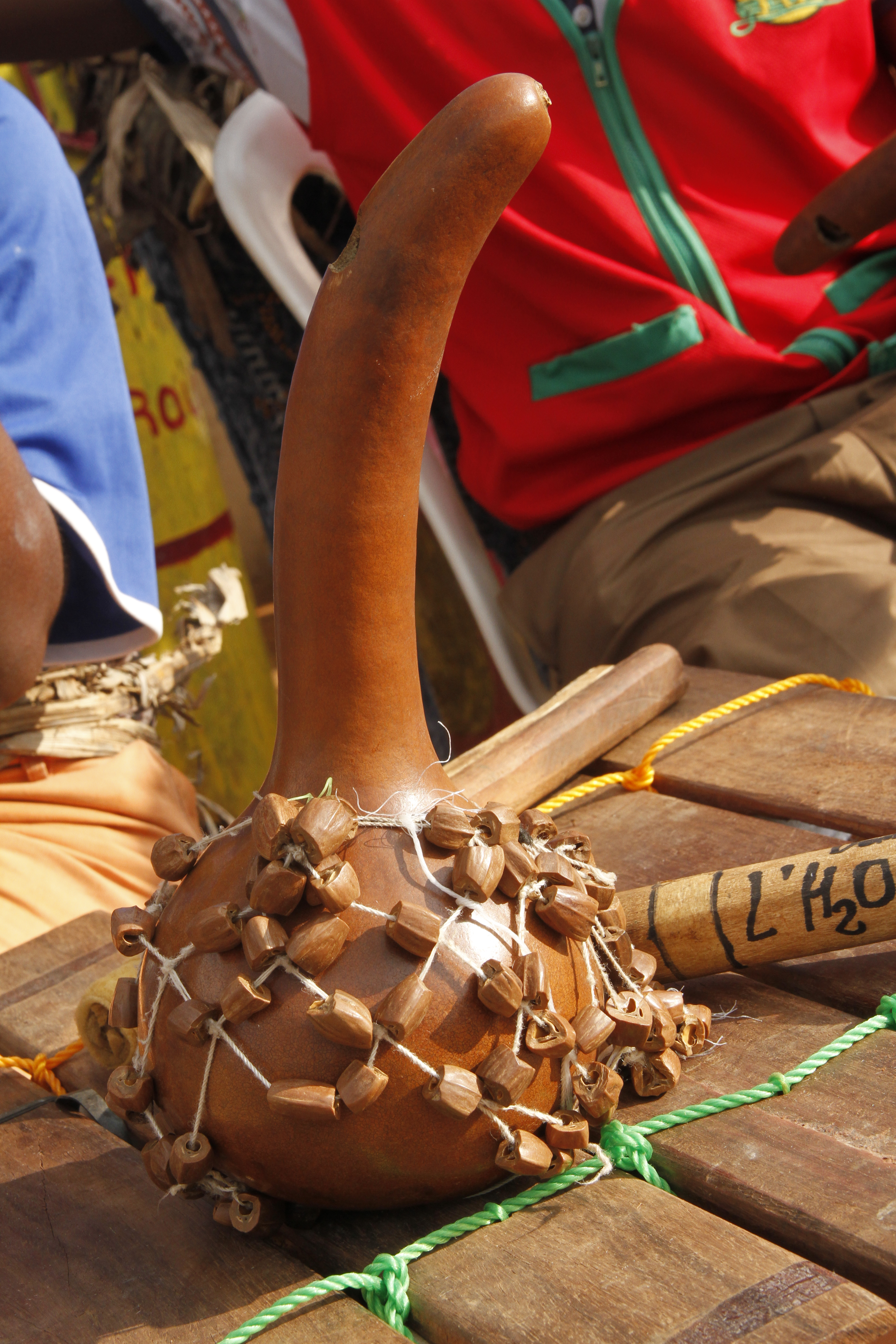

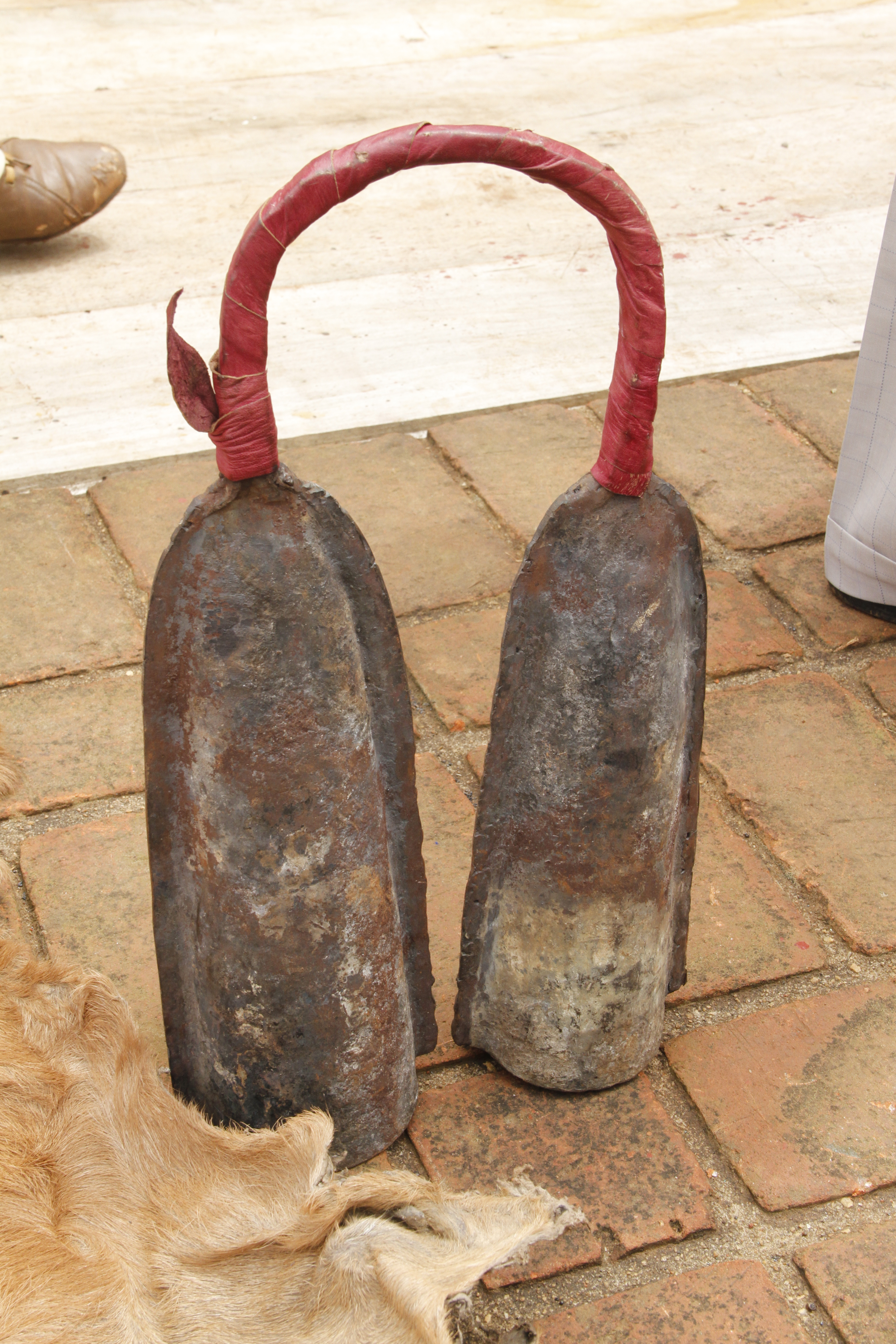
