= Medumba Arts and Culture Festival =

Biennial Medumba cultural festival in Cameroon

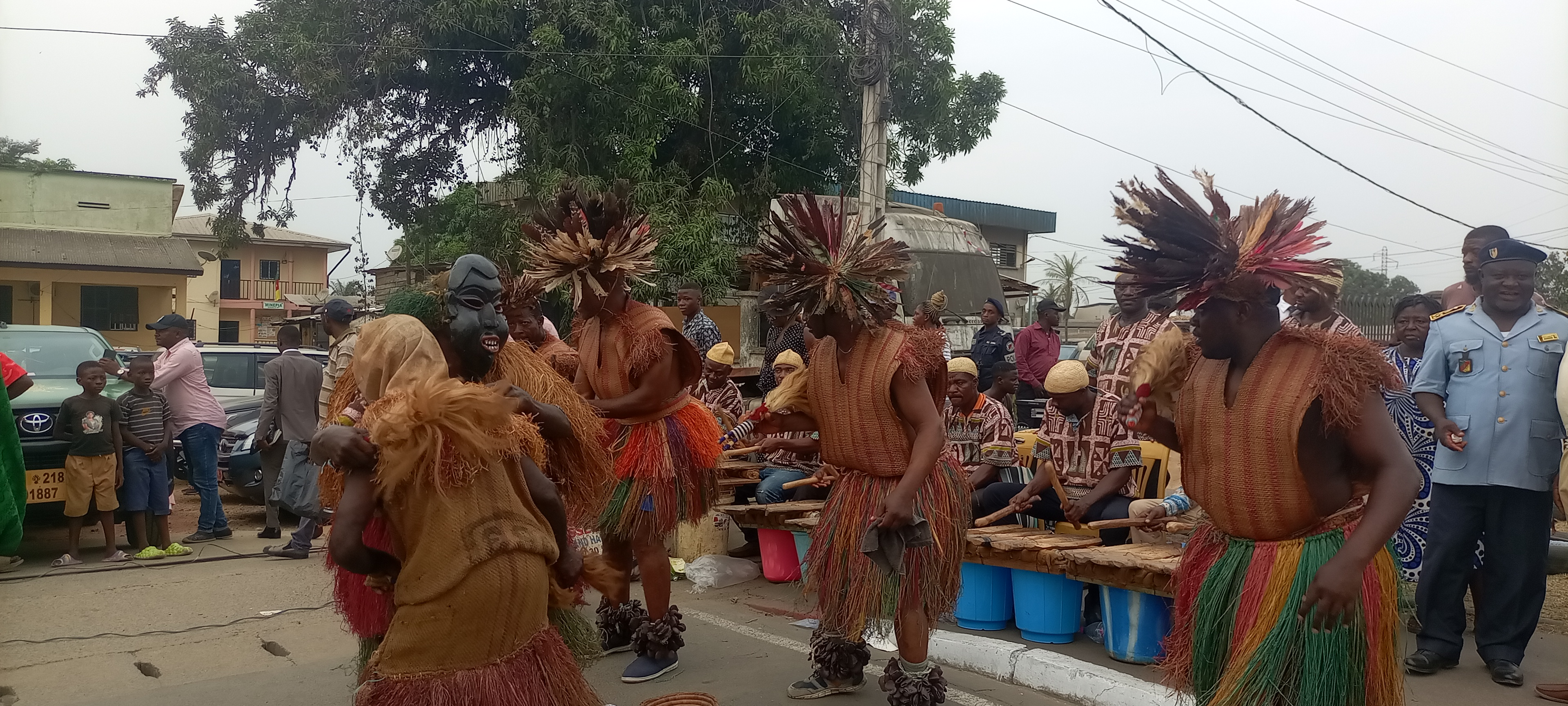
- Festival des arts et de la culture medumba
- Status: Active
- Genre: Cultural festival
- Frequency: Biennial
- Locations: Bangangté, West Region
- Country: Cameroon
- Years active: 1995–present
- Founder: Kum Ntsi Medumba
- Organiser: Kum Ntsi Medumba

The Medumba Arts and Culture Festival (French: Festival des arts et de la culture medumba, often abbreviated as FESTAC Medumba) is a biennial cultural festival held in Banganté, in the Ndé department of Western Cameroon. Established in 1995 by the Kum Ntsi Medumba association, the event typically takes place in July and gathers the 14 main villages of the Ndé department to promote the Medumba language.

== Festival Presentation ==
=== Dates and Locations ===
Bangangté, the capital of the Ndé department, hosts FESTAC Medumba for a duration of two weeks.

Since its origin in 1995, this cultural event has grown in popularity and attendance. In 2010, the festival attracted nearly 50,000 visitors, demonstrating its increasing regional influence. The 11th edition, held from July 6 to 22, 2012, in Bangangté, centered around the theme of preserving cultural heritage and once again brought local communities together.

=== Program and activities ===
FESTAC Medumba takes place for two weeks and activities to preserve culture take place during this period. The festival is characterised by themed days dedicated to the traditions, local history, and craftsmanship of participating villages within the Ndé department.

The primary objective of the event is the revitalization of the Medumba language. Additionally, the festival serves as an exhibition space for heritage arts, featuring public performances of traditional folklore, storytelling, regional legends, and indigenous dances, alongside fairs displaying local artisan crafts and culinary practices.

=== Attendance and socio-economic impact ===
The festival also attracts regional businesses and sponsors, who participate through temporary exhibition stands and promotional activities. Attendees regularly include local residents, traditional dignitaries, national political figures, tourists, and members of the Cameroonian diaspora.

=== Activities and events ===
During the festival, visitors can see and take part in many recreational and traditional activities. Other main events include a public parade known as the Festac Caravan, language competitions, theater plays, conferences, and a sports gala evening. The festival schedule also features special days, including the Day of the Paramount Chiefs, the Day of Associations, and the Day of Teachers and Universities. Additionally, the festival hosted the official laying of the foundation stone for the local Medumba Museum complex.

== Kum Ntsi Medumba ==
Kum Ntsi Medumba is a cultural association founded in 1995. The association works toward the preservation and promotion of Medumba language and culture.

Since its creation, the association has organized the Medumba Arts and Culture Festival (FESTAC Medumba), which serves as its principal cultural initiative. Kum Ntsi Medumba also operates Radio Medumba FM, a community radio station based in Bangangté.
