= Medumba phonology =

Medumba phonology is the way in which the Medumba language is pronounced. Medumba is a Bamileke language of Cameroon; the people who speak it originate from the Nde division of the West Region of the country. It deals with phonetics, phonotactics and their variation across different dialects of Medumba.

== Segments ==
Initial research on the Medumba segment inventory was conducted by Voorhoeve in the early 1960s, and published in Voorhoeve (1965). He identified 15 vowels and 40 consonants. Not described by Voorhoeve (1965) are the plain and pre-nasalized bilabial trills /ʙ/, /ᵐʙ/, which occur most often before central vowels /ʉ, ə/, which brings the total number of consonants to 42. The following two subsections survey the vowel and consonant inventory.

=== Vowels ===
Medumba has a 12 simple vowels, and 5 complex vowels (diphthongs).

==== Simple vowels ====
Medumba has 12 phonemic vowels given in the following inventory:

Simple vowels
		Front	Central	Back
Closed (High)	+Advanced Tongue Root	i	ʉ	u
Closed (High)	-Advanced Tongue Root	ɪ		ʊ
Closed (Non-high)	Mid	e	ə	o
Closed (Non-high)	Low-mid	ɛ		ɔ
Closed (Non-high)	Low	a		ɑ
(adapted from Voorhoeve 1965:320, fn. 6; Voorhoeve 1977:65)

Examples of simple vowels
Phoneme	Example		
Phoneme	Word	IPA	Gloss
/i/	fídə	[fídə́]	'to be arrogant'
/ʉ/	fʉdə	[fʉ́də́]	'to fly'
/u/	fubə	[fúbə́]	'bedding'
/ɪ/	fídə	[fɪ́də́]	'to peel'
/ʊ/	fudə	[fʊ́də́]	'hunting, net'
/e/	fènə	[fènə́]	'to choke, suffocate'
/ə/	fət	[fə̀t]	'wind'
/o/	fogə	[fógə́]	'widowship'
/a/	fat	[fàt]	'head-protector pillow for load-carrying'
/ɑ/	fɑ'ɑ	[fɑ́ʔɑ́]	'kind of tree'
(adapted from Voorhoeve 1965:327;3.2.1)

==== Diphthong vowels ====
Medumba has five phonemic diphthongs.

Diphthongs in Medumba
		V1		
		Front	Central	Back
		i	ʉ	u
V2	a	ia	ʉa	
V2	ə	iə		
V2	ɑ		ʉɑ	uɑ
(adapted from Voorhoeve 1965:320, fn. 6)

Examples of diphthongs in Medumba
/ia/		fyaŋə [fiaŋə] 'sort of tree'	/uɑ/	cwɑdə [cuɑdə] 'to sow, plant'
/ʉa/		fʉɑgə [fʉɑgə] 'to blow'	/ʉɑ/	fʉɑgə [fʉɑgə] 'to be wild'
/iə/	(a)	nzwəʔə /ᶮjʷiəʔə/➝[ⁿzʷəʔə] 'sort of dance'		
/iə/	(b)	və /gʷiə/➝[və] L 'architecture'		
/iə/	(c)	tsə'tsə /ciəʔ-tə/ ➝ [tsəʔtə] 'to collect'	cf.	cə' [cəʔ] H 'servant of chief'
/iə/	(d)	zə /jiə/ ➝ [zə] H 'relative pronoun'	cf.	yən [jen] H 'demonstrative pronoun'
/iə/	(e)	mfə /ᵐfiə/➝[ᵐfə] H 'oath'	cf.	mvə /ᵐfə/➝[ᵐvə] H 'on'
(adapted from Voorhoeve 1965:325;3.1.6-7 and 327;3.2.2) row 1 = orthography; row 2 = [IPA]; row 3 = 'gloss'

Diphthongs involve a combination of a closed (high) vowel (V1) /i,ʉ,u/ with a non-closed (non-high) vowel (V2) /a,ə,ɑ/, as follows:

- front /i/ combines with front or centre /a/ and /ə/ to form /ia/ and
  - front /i/ does not combine with back /ɑ/, so */iɑ/ is not a possible diphthong
- central /ʉ/ combines with front or back /a/ and /ɑ/ to form /ʉa/ and /ʉɑ/
  - central /ʉ/ does not combine with central /ə/; so */ʉə/ is not a possible diphthong
- back /u/ combines with back /ɑ/ to form /uɑ/
  - back /u/ does not combine non-back vowels, so */ua/ and */uə/ are not possible diphthongs

=== Consonants ===
The canonical morpheme in Medumba is a single syllable, either an open CV syllable or a closed CVC syllable (Voorhoeve 1965:319). This morpheme structure constraint has consequences for the consonant inventory. Indeed, a notable property of Medumba is that the number of contrastive consonants differs according to whether one considers consonants in onset position (i.e., consonants that begin a CV or CVC syllable) or consonants in coda position (i.e. consonants that end a CVC syllable). Below, the consonant inventory is introduced, and the distributional differences between coda (C2) and onset (C1) consonants are described.

Medumba has 42 consonants, of which 18 are simplex consonants and 24 are complex consonants.

==== Simplex consonants ====
There are 18 simplex consonants in Medumba (Voorhoeve 1965).

Medumba has 18 simple consonants, with three of them (placed in parentheses in the table below) being extremely rare.

Simplex consonants
		labial	alveolar	palatal	velar	glottal
nasal		m	n	ɲ	ŋ	
stop	voiced	b	d	ɟ (Note: Occurs only in onset positions.)	ɡ	
stop	voiceless		t	c	k	ʔ (Note: Occurs only in coda positions.)
trill		ʙ				
fricative	voiced	(v)	(z)			
fricative	voiceless	f	s	(ʃ)		
approximant		w		j		
(adapted from Voorhoeve 1965:320, and Nganmou 1991:62)

Note the absence of the following segments:

- there is a voiced bilabial stop /b/, but no counterpart voiceless bilabial stop */p/
  - but [p] occurs as an allophone of /b/
- there is a voiceless palatal fricative /ʃ/ (with limited distribution), but no counterpart voiced palatal fricative */ʒ/
  - but [ʒ] occurs as an allophone of /ɟ/
- there are velar nasal and oral stops, but no counterpart velar fricatives */ɣ/ or */x/
  - but [ɣ] occurs as a release in the /ᵑg/~[ᵑgɣ] alternation, and [x] occurs as a release in the /ᵑk/~[ᵑkx] alternation

==== Complex consonants ====
There are 24 complex consonants found in Medumba (Voorhoeve 1965:326, section 3.1.9). Complex consonants only occur in onset position.

Complex consonants
			labial	alveolar	palatal	velar
labialized	nasal				ɲʷ	ŋʷ
labialized	stop	voiced	bʷ		ɟʷ	gʷ
labialized	stop	voiceless			cʷ	kʷ
labialized	fricative			sʷ		
pre-nasalized	trill		ᵐʙ			
pre-nasalized	plosive	voiced	ᵐb	ⁿd	ᶮɟ	ᵑg
pre-nasalized	plosive	voiceless		ⁿt	ᶮc	ᵑk
pre-nasalized	fricative		ᵐf	ⁿs		
pre-nasalized labialized	plosive	voiced	ᵐbʷ		ᶮɟʷ	ᵑgʷ
pre-nasalized labialized	plosive	voiceless			ᶮcʷ	ᵑkʷ
pre-nasalized labialized	fricative			ⁿsʷ		
(adapted from Voorhoeve 1965:326)

Note the following gaps in the inventory of complex consonants:

- no labialized labial nasal or voiceless stop: */mʷ/, */pʷ/, */ᵐpʷ/
- no labialized alveolar (nasal or oral) stop: */nʷ/, */dʷ/, */ⁿdʷ/, */tʷ/, */ⁿtʷ/
- no labialized voiceless labial, palatal or velar fricative: */fʷ/, */ᵐfʷ/, */ʃʷ/, */ᶮʃʷ/, */xʷ/, */ᵑxʷ/

==== Final consonants ====
Of the 40 consonants found in Medumba, only 7 can be coda consonants: the 3 nasal stops /m, n, ŋ/, the 3 counterpart voiced oral stops /b, d, ɡ/, and the glottal stop /ʔ/.

Final consonants and their allophones
			Place of Articulation			
			labial	alveolar	velar	glottal
Manner of Articulation	nasal stop		m	n	ŋ	
Manner of Articulation	oral stop	voiced	b ~ p	d ~ l	ɡ ~ ʁ/k	
Manner of Articulation	oral stop	voiceless				ʔ
(adapted from Voorhoeve 1965:328, sn. 3.3.3)

===== Final nasals =====
Final nasals include bilabial /m/, alveolar /n/, and velar /ŋ/.

Examples of final nasals
Phoneme	Example		
Phoneme	Word	IPA	Gloss
/m/	cùm	[cʊm] L(H)	'prune'
/n/	tɑn L	[tɑn] L(H)	'cricket'
/ŋ/	fòŋmɑŋgəm LHL	[foŋ.mɑ.ᵑgəm] LHL(H)	'sort of ant'
(adapted from Voorhoeve 1965:328;3.3.3)

===== Final stops =====
Final stops includes bilabial /b/ (with allophone [p]), alveolar /d/ (with allophones [l,t]), velar /g/ (with allophone [ʁ, k]), and glottal /ʔ/.

Examples of final stops
Phoneme	Allophone	Example		
Phoneme	Allophone	Word	IPA	Gloss
/b/	[b]			
/b/	[p]	cùupnyɑm	[cʊʊp.ɲɑm]	'wild cat'
/d/	[d]			
/d/	[l, t]	mfətni	[ᵐfət.ni] HH	'reconciliation ceremony'
/g/	[g]			
/g/	[ʁ, k]	ciaktə	[ciak.tə] HH	'hairstyle,cap'
/ʔ/	[ʔ]			
(adapted from Voorhoeve 1965:328;3.3.3) for examples of consonant allophones, see Danis, Barnes & O'Connor 2012

==== Initial consonants ====
The below table presents the inventory of onset consonants and their allophones. The only consonant excluded from onset position is the glottal stop /ʔ/. All other consonants occur in onset position, so there are 39 possible onset consonants. In onset position, nasals may be plain (C) or labialized (Cʷ). All other consonant types (voiced plosives, voiceless plosives, fricative) occur as plain (C), labialized (Cʷ), pre-nasalized (ⁿC), or pre-nasalized and labialized (ⁿCʷ). In addition, onset consonants display allophonic variation that is conditioned by the following vowel.

Onset consonants and their allophones
					Place of articulation			
					labial	alveolar	palatal	velar
Manner of articulation	stop	nasal		C	m	n	ɲ	ŋ
Manner of articulation	stop	nasal		Cʷ			ɲʷ	ŋʷ
Manner of articulation	stop	oral	voiced	C	b ~ p	d ~ l	ɟ ~ y/z/ʒ	ɡ ~ ʁ
Manner of articulation	stop	oral	voiced	Cʷ	bʷ ~ bⱽ		ɟʷ ~ yʷ>/zʷ	gʷ ~ w/v
Manner of articulation	stop	oral	voiced	ⁿC	ᵐb	ⁿd	ᶮɟ ~ ⁿz/ᶮʒ	ᵑg ~ ᵑgˠ
Manner of articulation	stop	oral	voiced	ⁿCʷ	ᵐbʷ		ᶮɟʷ ~ ⁿzʷ	ᵑgʷ
Manner of articulation	stop	oral	voiceless	C		t ~ tʰ	c ~ ʦ/cʃ	k ~ kʰ/kx
Manner of articulation	stop	oral	voiceless	Cʷ			cʷ ~ tsʷ/ʃ	kʷ
Manner of articulation	stop	oral	voiceless	ⁿC		ⁿt ~ ⁿtʰ	ᶮc ~ ⁿts/ᶮcʃ	ᵑk ~ ᵑkʰ/ᵑkx
Manner of articulation	stop	oral	voiceless	ⁿCʷ			ᶮcʷ~ ᶮʃ	ᵑkʷ
Manner of articulation	fricative			C	f	s		
Manner of articulation	fricative			Cʷ		sʷ		
Manner of articulation	fricative			ⁿC	ᵐf ~ ᵐv	ⁿs ~ ⁿz		
Manner of articulation	fricative			ⁿCʷ		ⁿsʷ		
(adapted from Voorhoeve 1965:326)

===== Initial labials =====
Initial labials include:

- plain consonants (C: /m/, /b/ (with allophone [p]), and /f/ (with allophone [ᵐv])
- labialized consonants (Cʷ): /bʷ/ (with allophone [bⱽ])
- pre-nasalized consonants (ⁿC): /ᵐb/ and /ᵐf/
- pre-nasalized labialized consonants (ⁿCʷ): /ᵐbʷ/

Examples of labial onsets
C	nasal	/m/	[m]	mʉ' [mʉʔ] H 'lake'(V323;3.1.2)		
C	stop	/b/	[b]	bɑb L [bɑb] L 'wing' (V323;3.1.2)	[p]	pxxx [pxxx] /__[+Closed.V] 'zzz'
C	fricative	/f/	[f]	fàm [fàm] 'deserted homestead (V323;3.1.2)'	[ᵐv]	mvxxx [ᵐvxx] /__[-Closed.V] 'zzz'
Cʷ	stop	/bʷ/	[bʷ]	bwə'ə [bʷəʔə] ~ [bʷəʔɑ] HH 'owl' (V332;4.1)	[bᵛ]	bvə [bᵛə] H 'there' (V324;3.1.4)
ᴺC	stop	/ᵐb/	[ᵐb]	mbà [ᵐbaʔ] L(H) 'nut' (V324;3.1.3)		
ᴺC	fricative	/ᵐf/	[ᵐf]	mfaŋ [ᵐfáŋ] 'wound' (V324;3.1.3)		
ᴺCʷ	stop	/ᵐbʷ/	[ᵐbʷ]	mbwə [ᵐbʷə] H 'goat' (V325;3.1.5)		
(adapted from Voorhoeve 1965) row 1 = orthography; row 2 = [IPA]; row 3 = 'gloss'

===== Initial alveolars =====
Initial alveolars include:

- plain consonants (C): /n/, /d/ (with allophone [l]), /t/ (with allophone [tʰ]), and /s/
- labialized consonants (Cʷ): /sʷ/
- pre-nasalized consonants (ⁿC): /ⁿd/, /ⁿt/ (with allophone [ⁿtʰ]), and /ⁿs/ (with allophone [ⁿz])
- pre-nasalized labialized consonants (ᴺCʷ): /ⁿsʷ/

Examples of alveolar onsets
C	nasal	/n/	[n]	nà [nɑ] L 'field' (V323;3.1.2)		
C	stop, voiced	/d/	[d]	dim [dɪm] H 'tongue' (V323;3.1.2)	[l]	lxxx [lxxx] /__[-Closed.V] 'zzz'
C	stop, voiceless	/t/	[t]	tu [tu] tone? 'head'	[tʰ]	tu [tʰʊ] tone? 'to pierce' (Voorhoeve 1966:323)
C	fricative	/s/	[s]	sògo [sògó] LH 'to wash' (V323;3.1.2)		
Cʷ	fricative	/sʷ/	[sʷ]	swá [sʷá] 'broom, tail' (V324;3.1.4)		
ᴺC	stop, voiced	/ⁿd/	[ⁿd]	ndəb L [ⁿdəb] L(H) 'cotton' (V324;3.1.3)		
ᴺC	stop, voiceless	/ⁿt/	[ⁿt]	ntɑnə [ⁿtɑnə] HH 'market, business' (V324;3.1.3)	[ⁿtʰ]	ntxx ['ⁿtʰyyy]/__[+Closed] 'zzz'
ᴺC	fricative	/ⁿs/	[ⁿs]	nsindɑ [ⁿsí-ⁿdɑ] H!H 'floor' (V324;3.1.3)	[ⁿz]	nzxxx [ⁿzyyyy] /__[-Closed] 'zzz'
ᴺCʷ	fricative	/ⁿsʷ/	[ⁿsʷ]	nswə [ⁿsʷə] H 'new' (V325;3.1.5)		
(adapted from Voorhoeve 1965) row 1 = orthography; row 2 = [IPA]; row 3 = 'gloss'

===== Initial palatals =====
Initial palatals include:

- plain consonants (C): /ɲ/, /ɟ/ (with allophones [j], [ʒ], [z]), /c/ (with allophones [ts] and [cʃ]), and /ʃ/
- labialized consonants (Cʷ): /ɲʷ/, /ɟʷ/ (with allophones [ʒʷ],[zʷ]), and /cʷ/ (with allophones [ʃ] and [tsʷ])
- pre-nasalized consonants (ᴺC): /ᶮɟ/ (with allophones [ᶮʒ], [ⁿz]), and /ᶮc/ (with allophones [ᶮcʃ] and [ⁿts])
- pre-nasalized labialized consonants ('ⁿCʷ): /ᶮcʷ/ with allophone [ᶮʃ]

Examples of palatal onsets
Phoneme	Allophone	Example		
Phoneme	Allophone	Orthography	IPA	Gloss
/ɲ/	[ɲ]	nyàang	[ɲaaŋ] LH	'to dance' (V323;3.1.2)
/ɟ/	[ɟ]	jənə	[ɟənə] HH	'to see' (V323;3.1.2)
/ɟ/	[j]			
/ɟ/	[ʒ]			
/ɟ/	[z]	zə	[zə] H __/i/	'relative pronoun' (V325; 3.1.6)
/c/	[c]	tu	[cu]	'head' (ref)
/c/	[ts]	tu	[tsʰʊ]	'to pierce' (Voorhoeve 1966:323)
/c/	[cʃ]			
/ʃ/	[ʃ]			
/ɲʷ/	[ɲʷ]	nywìi	['ɲʷiiʔ] LH	'to spoil' (V324;3.1.4)
/ɟʷ/	[ɟʷ]	jwəde LH	[ɟᵂədə] LH	'to wet' (V324; 3.1.4)
/ɟʷ/	[ʒʷ]			
/ɟʷ/	[zʷ]			
/cʷ/	[cʷ]	cwi	[cʷii] LH	'to give a name' (V327,3.3.1)
/cʷ/	[ʃ]	shʉmə	/cʷʉmə/, [ʃʉmə] HH __ʉ,u	'to swing' (V325;3.1.8)
/cʷ/	[tsʷ]			
/ᶮɟ/	[ᶮɟ]	nyjiag	[ᶮjiag] H	'mane' (V324;3.1.3)
/ᶮɟ/	[ᶮʒ]			
/ᶮɟ/	[ⁿz]			
/ᶮc/	[ᶮc]	ntɑnə	[ⁿtɑnə] HH	'market, business' (V324;3.1.3)
/ᶮc/	[ᶮcʃ]			
/ᶮc/	[ⁿts]			
/ⁿsʷ/	[ⁿsʷ]	nyjwi	[ᶮɟᵂi]	'woman' (V325;3.1.5)
/ⁿsʷ/	[ⁿzʷ]			
/ᶮcʷ/	[ᶮcʷ]			
/ᶮcʷ/	[ᶮʃ]			
(adapted from Voorhoeve 1965)

===== Initial velars =====
Initial velars include:

- plain consonants (C): /ŋ/, /g/ (with allophone [ʁ]), /k/ (with allophones [kʰ] and [kx])
- labialized consonants (Cʷ): /ŋʷ/ and /gʷ/ (with allophones [w] and [v])
- pre-nasalized consonants (ᴺC): /ᵑg/ (with allophone [ᵑgˠ])and /ᵑk/ (with allophones [ᵑkʰ] and [ᵑkx])
- pre-nasalized labialized consonants (ⁿCʷ): /ᵑgʷ/ and /ᵑkʷ/

Examples of velar onsets
Phoneme	Allophone	Example		
Phoneme	Allophone	Orthography	IPA	Gloss
/ŋ/	[ŋ]	ŋà'ŋà'	[ŋɑʔ-ŋɑʔ] LL	'mosquito' (V323;3.1.2)
/g/	[g]	gubtə	[gub-tə] HH	'to linger on' (V323;3.1.2)
/g/	[ʁ]			
/t/	[k]			
/t/	[kʰ]			
/t/	[kx]			
/ŋʷ/	[ŋʷ]	ŋwìnte LLH	[ŋʷin-tə] LLH	'to grow thin' (V324;3.1.4)
/gʷ/	[gʷ]	gwə	[gᵂə] H	'who?' (V324; 3.1.4)
/gʷ/	[w]			
/gʷ/	[v]			
/kʷ/	[kʷ]			
/ᵑg/	[ᵑg]	ŋgà	[ᵑgɑ] L(H)	'root, vein' (V324;3.1.3)
/ᵑg/	[ᵑgˠ]			
/ᵑk/	[ᵑk]	ŋkɑnə	[ᵑkɑnə] HH	'market, business' (V324;3.1.3)
/ᵑk/	[ᵑkʰ]			
/ᵑk/	[ᵑkx]			
/ᵑgʷ/	[ᵑgʷ]	ŋgwàn	[ᵑgʷan] L(H)	'slave' (V325;3.1.5)
/kʷ/	[ᵑkʷ]			
(adapted from Voorhoeve 1965:323ff.)

=== Phonological processes affecting segments ===
==== Vowel insertion ====
Consonant-final words - which are generally CVC because of the size constraint that favours CV or CVC words - are often augmented by a final vowel. This process of vowel insertion happens in one of two contexts: (i) before a pause; (ii) at the end of a sentence. The quality of the inserted vowel is conditioned by the final consonant: if the final C is a glottal stop, then the inserted vowel is schwa; elsewhere, the inserted vowel is a copy of the stem vowel. Examples illustrating vowel insertion are given in (60).

(60) a. koo                          b.  cintEE
       ko-o                             cin-te-e
       love-FV                          xx-yy-FV
       'to want, to love'               'to urinate'
       (adapted from Voorhoeve 1965:332)

==== Consonant mutation ====
Consonants in onset position surface with different variants. This consonant allophone, a form of consonant mutation, is conditioned by the following vowel. There are seven conditioning contexts, as follows:

1. the non-closed vowels
2. the closed vowels
3. the high front vowel /i/
4. the high non-front vowels /ʉ/ and /u/
5. the high central (non-front, non-back) vowel /ʉ/
6. the high back vowel /u/
7. the vowels /o/ and /ə/

Conditioning contexts for consonant mutation
Context		Segment Set	Class	Effect	Alternation
1.	__ V[-Closed]	{b, d, ɟ, g}	voiced stop	"devoicing"	/b/→[p]; /d/→[l]; /ɟ/→[y]; /ɟᵂ/→[yᵂ]; /g/→[ʁ]; /gᵂ/→[w]
1.	__ V[-Closed]	{ᵐf, ⁿs}	nasalized fricative	voicing	/ᵐf/→[ᵐv]; /ⁿs/→[ⁿz] (except before /o/)
2.	__ V[+Closed]	{t, ⁿt, k, ᵑk}	voiceless stop	aspiration	/t/→[tʰ]; /ⁿt/→[ⁿtʰ]; /k/→[kʰ/kˣ]; /ᵑk/→[ᵑkʰ/ᵑkˣ]
2.	__ V[+Closed]	{b}	bilabial	devoicing	/b/→[p] (optional)
3.	__ /i/	{ɟ, ɟᵂ, ᶮɟ, ᶮɟᵂ, c, cᵂ}	palatal	fronting + spirantization	/ɟ/→[z]; /ɟᵂ/→[zᵂ]; /ᶮɟ/→[ⁿz]; /ᶮɟᵂ/→[ⁿzᵂ]; /c/ →[ʦ]; /cᵂ/ → [ʦᵂ]; /ᶮcᵂ/ →[ ᶮʃ]?
4.	__ /ʉ, u/	{ɟ, ᶮɟ, c, cᵂ}	palatal	spirantization	/ɟ/ →[ʒ]; /ᶮɟ/ → [ᶮʒ]; /c/ → [cʃ]; /cᵂ/ → [ʃ] (3.1.8, V1965)
4.	__ /ʉ, u/	{gᵂ}	labialized voiced velar	spirantization	/gᵂ/→[v]
5.	__ /ʉ/	{g, ᵑg}	simplex & nasalized voiced velar	spirantization	/g/ → [ɣ]; /ᵑg/ → [ᵑgˠ]
6.	__ /u/	{g}	simplex voiced velar	retraction + spirantization	/g/ → [ʁ]
7.	__ /o, ə/	{bᵂ}	labialized bilabial	spirantization	/bᵂ/ → [bᵛ]
(adapted from Voorhoeve 1965:xxx-zzz)

== Tone ==
Medumba is famous for the extent to which tone shapes grammar. Although having only a two-tone contrast, namely High (H) and Low (L), surface tone melodies are conditioned by a variety of lexical, morphological and syntactic factors:

1. lexically specified level Low (L) and High (H) tone
2. morphologically derived falling (HL) and rising (HL) contour tones
3. syntactically conditioned downstep, where H is produced at a lower pitch than a preceding H tone

=== Two tones: high versus low ===
Medumba is described as a two-level tone system with low (L) and high (H) tones; examples are given in Table 16. Observe that the L/H contrast is found with all Lexical (open) class categories; this includes verbs, nouns and prepositions. Likewise, Functional (closed-class) categories show an L/H contrasts; this includes verbal F-categories (C, T, and Aspect) and nominal F-categories (Dem, Det, Pl). [Describe examples; also give minimal pairs]

==== Tone contrasts with verbs ====
Verb stems come in two shapes, CV and CVC, with each one contrasting Low and High tone. See (1-5) for examples of High/Low tone contrast with CV stems, and (6-6) for examples of High/Low tone contrast with CVC stems.

High/Low contrast with CV verb stems
	Low tone			High tone			Source
IPA	orthography	gloss	IPA	orthography	gloss		Source
	bɑ L	'ecaillier'		bɑ	'be crazy'	V1976:111	
	lò	'stand up'		lo	'leave'	V1976:123	
	nyì	'defecate'		nyi	'press'	V1976:125	
	tà	'be strong, hard'		ta	1. trade; 2. deny; 3. defend oneself	V1976:127	
	zwì	'laugh'		zwi	'kill'	V1976:131	

High/Low contrast with CVC verb stems
	Low tone			High tone			Source
IPA	orthography	gloss	IPA	orthography	gloss		Source
	fʉ̀əgə LH	'be light'		fʉəgə H	'blow'	V1976:117	
	kʉ̀a L	'sharpen, limer'		kʉa H	'reclame'	V1976:121	
	làdə LH	'assemble'		ladə	'lick'	V1976:122	
	lɑnə	'cry, lament'		lɑnə	'be clean, clear, healthy'	V1976:122	
	tagə	'miss'		tagə	'gather with full hands'	V1976:127	
	tamə LH	'mix, assemble'		tamə	1. 'pull with thread'; 2. 'sew'; 3. 'withe'	V1976:127	
	tɔgə LH	'spit'		tɔgə	'pass'	V1976:128	
	vɔgə LH	'wake up with a start'		vɔgə	'be short'	V1976:129	
[jɑʔɑ] LH	yɑʔ'ɑ LH	'cross'	[jɑʔɑ] HH	yɑʔɑ	'give credit'	V1976:130	
	yɔgə LH	1. 'live'; 2. 'devore'		yɔgə	1. 'warm onsself up'; 2. 'pass the day'	V1976:130	
	ywədə LH	'soak, wet'		ywədə	1. 'be rested; 2. 'be full (from eating'	V1976:130	
(adapted from Voorhoeve 1976)

==== Tone contrasts with nouns ====
High/Low tone contrast with CV nouns stems
	Low tone				High tone				Source
	IPA	orthography	gloss		IPA	orthography	gloss		Source
L(H)	[mbà]	m-bà	'nut' (c2)	H(L)	[mbá]	m-ba	'pot, marmite'	V1976:111	
L(L)	[cɔ]	cɔ	'news, story' (c1/4)	H(H)	[cɔ]	cɔ	'theft' (c3)	V1976:114	
L(L)	[ndɔ]	ndɔ	'long solid unit'	H(L)	[ndɔ]	ndɔ	1. horn "corne"; 2. whistle	V1976:115	
L(H)		fə	1. 'feather' (c3/5); 2.' leaf'	H(L)		fə	'dead body'	V19`76:116	
L(H)		sà	'star'	H(L)		sa	'game'	V1976:126	
L(H)		n-zà	'miracle' (c2/4)	H(L)		n-za	'hill'	V1976:131	
(adapted from Voorhoeve 1976)

High/Low tone contrast with CVC noun stems: (23-29)
	Low tone				High tone				Source
		IPA	orthography	gloss		IPA	orthography	gloss	Source
(23)	L(L)	[mbàn]	m-bàn	'rain' (c2)	H(L)	[mbán]	m-ban	'side, c?'	V1976:111
(24)	L(H)	[bùʔ]	bù'	'mushroom' (c3/5)	H(L)	[búʔ]	bu'	'package' (c3/6)	V1976:113
(25)	L(H)	[ɣəʔ]	ghə'	'cheek' (c3/5)	H(H)		ghə'	'avarice' (c3)	V1976:117
(26)	L(L)		n-tɑn	'string' (c1)	H(H)		n-tɑn	'trade, commerce' (c1)	V1976:127
(27)	L(H)		ŋ-kùn	'tail' (c2/4)	H(L)		ŋ-kun	'rice, beans'	V1976:121
(28)	L(L)		kɑb	'fence' (c1/4)	H(L)		ŋ-kɑb	'money' (c1)	V1976:119
(29)	L(L)		kam	'piece' (c3/5)	H(L)		ŋ-kam	'noble' (c1/4)	V1976:119
(30)	L(H)		cwed	'the bush'	L(H)		ncwed	'chiefancy	
(adapted from Voorhoeve 1976)

In principle, given the possibility of a stem bearing associated with one of four tone melodies — namely L(L), L(H), H(L) and H(H) for nouns and L or H for verbs — one expects to find a four-way tone contrast for a given segmental base (either CV or CVC). No such examples are attested within a given word-class, but there is one instance elf a 4-way contrast across word-classes. In addition, there are a few three-way contrasts for a given noun base, and numerous many four-way tone contrasts with the same base, if one looks at tone melodies across word-classes.

- CV tɔ, which has L(H), H(L) and H(H) stems
- CVC m-vɛd, which has L(L)
- CVC lɛn, to, and mvdd.

Examples are given in (1-3).

Tone contrasts across word classes: L versus H
	Low tone				High tone				Source
		IPA	orthography	gloss		IPA	orthography	gloss	Source
(1)	L(L)	—			H(L)		tɔ	'N: neck, throat' (c2)	V1976:128
(1)	L(H)		tɔ	N: 'nombril' (c3)	H(H)		tɔ	'N: hole' (c3/5)	V1976:128
(1)	L		tɔ-ɔ LH	1. V: 'govern'; 2. V: take/pay a debt	H	—			
(2)	L(L)		m-vɛd	N: 'rope' (c1/4)	H(L)		m-vɛd	'N: oil' (c5)	V1976:129
(2)	L-L(L)		m-vɛd-m-vɛd	N: 'mosquito' (c4)	H(L)		m-vɛd	'N: oil' (c5)	V1976:129
(2)	L(H)	—			H(H)		m-vɛd	'N: brother' (c1/4)	V1976:129
(2)	L		vɛd-ə LH	V: 'tremble'	H	—			V1976:129
(3)	L(L)		lɛn	N: 'sign' (c2/4)	H(L)		lɛn	N: 'name' (c3/5)	V1976:123
(3)	L(H)		lɛn	N: 'mark, quality, sort' (c2)	H(H)	—			V1976:123
(3)	L		lɛn-ə LH	V: know, recognize	H	—			V1976:123
(4)	L(L)		bàg	N: 'side' (c?)	H(L)	—			V1976:111
	L(H)		bàg	N: '1pl pronoun'	H(H)	—			V1976:111
	L		bàg-ə LH	V: 'split'	H		bag-ə HH	V: 'lean'	V1976:111
(5)	L(L)		bàm	N: 'belly" (c3/5)	H(L)	—			V1976:111
	L(H)				H(H)	—			V1976:111
	L		bàm-ə LH	V: 'wake up'	H		bam	V: 'accept, believer, answer'	V1976:111
(6)	L(L)				H(L)				
	L(H)		bu'	N: 'mushroom' (c3/5)	H(H)		bu'	N: package (c3/5)	
	L				H		bu'	V: 'play, sound out'	
(adapted from Voorhoeve 1976)

Noun classes
	Low tone				High tone				Source
		IPA	orthography	gloss		IPA	orthography	gloss	Source
(1)	L(L)		kà	'sorcellery, magic (c3)	L(H)		ŋ-kà	'rank' (c2)	V1976:119
(2)	L(L)	[kəʔ]	kə'	'tam-tam' (c3/5)	H(L)		ŋ-kə'	'ball'	V1976:120
(3)	L(H)		kɔ	'arrow" (c3/5)	L(H)		ŋ-kɔ	'pilon' (c1/4)	V1976:121
(4)	H		shun	'friendship (c1/4)	H(H)		n-shun	'friend' (c1/4)	V1976:126
(5)	H(H)		tʉ	1. 'tree' (c3/5); 2. 'up above'	H(L)		n-tʉ	'heart' (c/24)	V1976:129
(adapted from Voorhoeve 1976)

(3)  Low-tone           fù                          (4) High-tone          tʃə́ŋ   
                       [fù]                                                [tʃə́ŋ]
                       'medicine'                                           'food'         

(From Kouankem 2013:60; Mucha 2017: 8)

==== Tone contrasts with prepositions ====
(5)  Low-tone    (a)   mbàŋ       [ᵐbàŋ]      (b)   nùm     [nùm]       (c)   ɲàm     [ɲàm]                                                             
                       'next to'                    'on'                      'behind'

(6) High-tone          mʙə́    [ᵐʙə́]
                       'in front of'  (from Hawkes et al. 2015:122)

==== Tone contrasts with complementizers ====
(7)  Low-tone    (a)   ndà                        (8) High-tone         mbʉ   
                       [ⁿdà]                                           [ᵐbʉ́]
                       'C'                                              'C'    

(From)

==== Tone contrasts with demonstratives ====
(9)  Low-tone    (a)    s-ə̂n                     (10) High-tone         N yə́n   
                       [s-ə̂n]                                           [N  yə́n]
                       AGR-this                                          N    Dem.Dist
                                                                       'that N'    

(Kouankem 2013:60)

==== Tone contrasts with plural-marking ====
(11)  Low-tone    (a)   bà   N                    (12) High-tone        ba N 
                       [bà]                                             [bá]
                       'PL'                                            'PL'   

(Kouankem 2013:62)

=== Falling and rising tones ===
In addition to level high and low tones, Medumba exhibits falling (HL) and rising (LH) contour tones. These contour tones are morphologically derived from floating H tones that occur as affixes preceding or following the stems they associate with. These floating tones make themselves known by docking to tone-bearing units (TBUs) associated with L-tone, thus forming a tone contour. [DESCRIBE EXAMPLES; add LH examples]

(13)  L-tone verb (put in sentence)
      ghʉ̀ 
      [ɣʉ̀] 
      do
      'do’


(14)  Derived HL-tone verb (put in sentence)
      nghʉ̀ 
      [N-ɣʉ̀] 
      N-do
      'do, consecutive’

(identify source)

=== Downstep ===
Medumba shows downstep, where H is produced at a lower pitch than an immediately preceding H tone; downstep is represented as (ꜜ). Downstep is viewed as resulting from a floating Low tone that shifts the pitch level of a following High tone one step lower than the preceding High tone. Downstep is syntactically conditioned in that it occurs at phrasal boundaries:

- Downstep occurs between Subject and following Verb,
- Downstep occurs between Verb and following Complement
- Downstep occurs between Noun and following Complement
