= Backo =

Backo is a surname. Notable people with this surname include:

- Clark Backo (born 1993), Canadian actress
- Njacko Backo, Cameroonian musician
- Sam Backo (1961–2025), Australian rugby league footballer
