= Chiefdom of Bangoua =

Traditional chiefdom in Ndé, Cameroon

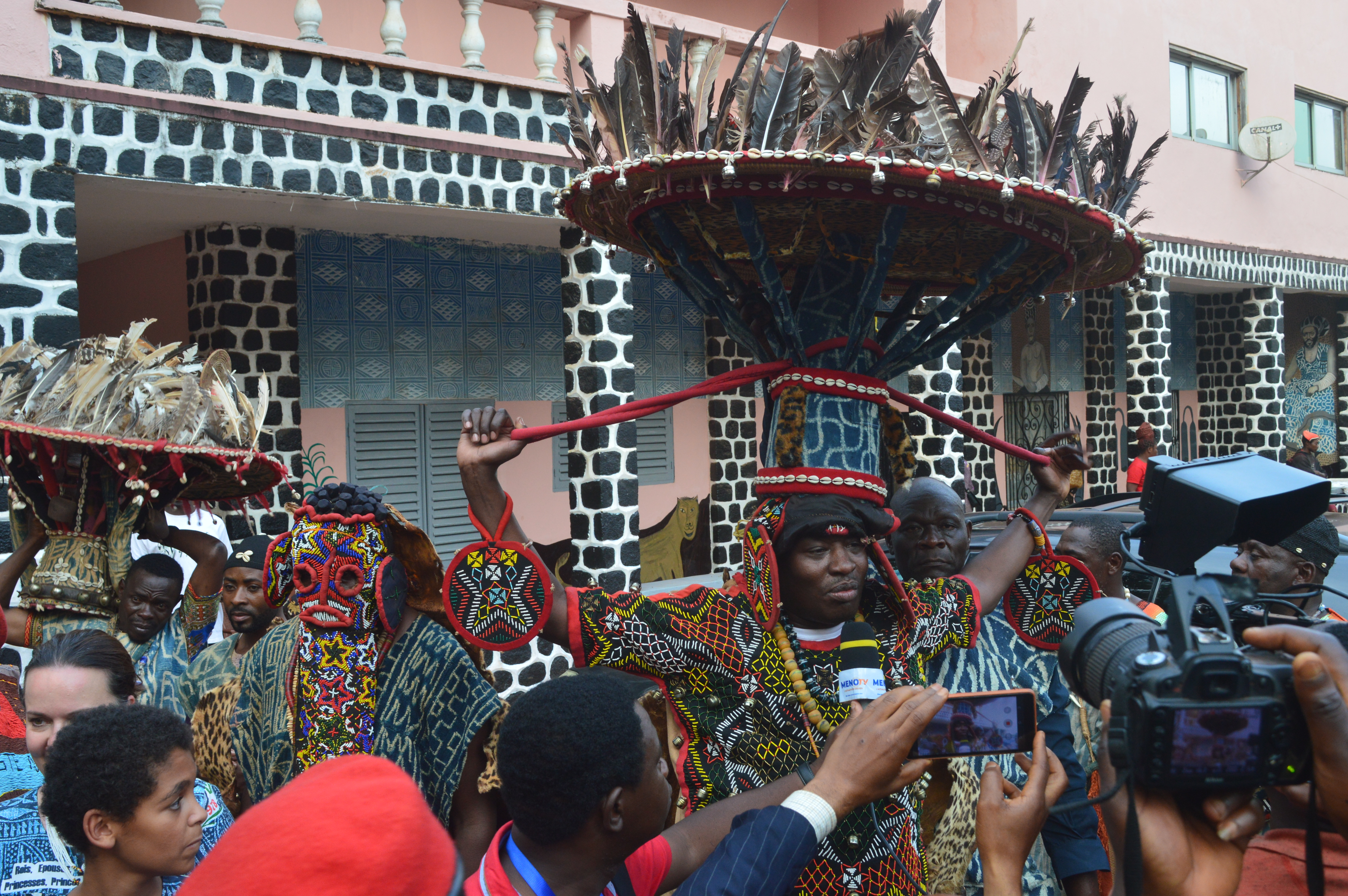
- Location: Cameroon

The Chiefdom of Bangoua (bangwa) is a traditional chiefdom located in the Ndé department, in the West Region of Cameroon. It serves as a gathering place for the local Bangoua people and the diaspora. It is headed by His Majesty "Fo" Julio Djampou Tchatchoung.

== History ==
The history of this Chiefdom goes back several centuries. According to oral traditions, it was founded by ancestors who migrated to the region in search of fertile land. The Bangoua Chiefdom is a sister chiefdom to Batoufam, having been founded by a hunter named Ndokwu, who came from the Bandrefam Chiefdom.

The name "Bangwa" comes from the stem Ngwe, meaning "up," and originally referred to both the region and its language. The correct traditional spelling is MbaNgwe, meaning "Up People," though today it is written as Nweh. The Germans, who arrived in the area in 1899 for trade, were the first Europeans to use the name.

In 1921, the British colonial administration grouped the Bangwa people into a single administrative unit, distinguishing them from neighboring forest cultures like the Bayang, Mbo, and Mundani. After World War I, when Germany lost its colony of Kamerun, the Bangwa region became part of British Cameroon, effectively making it a Bamileke enclave separated from French Cameroon by the Bamboutos Mountains.

By 1960, as British Cameroons faced a United Nations referendum on whether to join Nigeria or French Cameroon, the Bangwa people found themselves at a crucial point in their political future.

Over the years, the chiefdom has evolved and structured itself around the figure of the chief, who is regarded as the guardian of the community's traditions and values.

=== Languages ===
The Bangwa speak a Bantoid language that closely resembles the dialects spoken by the Western Bamileke, particularly those around Dschang and Fondongela. However, notable dialectical variations exist between the Bangwa and their Bamileke neighbors.

== Social Organization ==
The chiefdom is organized in a hierarchical system, with the chief at its head. The chief is assisted by a council of notables who help him make decisions regarding the management of the chiefdom's affairs. Community members also play an active role in decision-making, especially during village assemblies.

The museum is divided into two parts: the presentation of the chiefdom, its history and its traditions, and in the second the hunting and its principles, in Bangoua, in Cameroon and as far as Mali.

== Culture and Traditions ==
The Bangoua Chiefdom is rich in cultural traditions, particularly in relation to rituals, dances, and ceremonies. The inhabitants celebrate various festivals that mark important events in community life, such as harvests or rites of passage. The chiefdom houses a heritage hut that showcases an exhibition on themes such as art, hunting, and traditions.

== Economy ==
The economy of the Bangoua Chiefdom is primarily based on agriculture, with crops such as maize, cassava, and coffee. Livestock farming is also practiced, contributing to the sustenance of families.

Historically, the Bangwa people have been integrated to regional trade, linking the coastal seaport of Douala in the south with Fulani and Hausa traders in the north. They are primarily farmers, cultivating staple crops such as maize, yams, and peanuts. They also raise livestock, such as chickens and goats, which are essential to their daily life. Women typically handle planting and harvesting, while men clear the fields and engage in occasional hunting. The Bangwa have also developed trade relations with southeastern Nigerian communities.
