= University of Montagnes =

Private higher-education institution in Cameroon

Université des Montagnes
- Motto: Semper Altissimo Ascendere - Always Seek Excellence
- Type: Private university
- Established: 2000; 26 years ago
- Faculty: 43 full-time; 175 part-time & visiting; 79 administrative; 69 support staff
- Students: 1757 students: 824 Medicine; 332 Pharmacy; 193 Dental Surgery; 61 Vet. Medicine; 277 Technol; 70 Medical Sc
- Location: Bangangté, West Region of Cameroon, Cameroon
- Campus: 274 hectares (2.74 km^{2})
- Website: www.udm.aed-cm.org

Université des Montagnes is a private, non-profit university in Bangangté in the West Region of Cameroon, founded in 2000.

== History ==
The non-profit organization that later became Université des Montagnes was founded in 1994 by the Academy for Educational Development (AED).

The university's first classes began in October 2000 with 43 students. Between 2011 and 2012, student enrollment grew to 1,757. As of November 30, 2011 the institution had graduated 176 medical doctors, 18 doctors in pharmacy, 64 bachelor's degree holders in computer science & networking, 91 bachelor of technology holders in biomedical engineering, and 48 bachelor's degree holders in telecommunications networks.

Graduates of UdM currently pursue further studies at many other universities worldwide.

As of the 2013/2014 academic year, seven new academic majors became available at UdM: Agroforestry, Agronomy, Environment & Climate Change, Renewable Energy & Environmental Engineering, Applied Mathematics/Computer Science in Finance & Insurance, Reproductive Health, Medical Biology (for laboratory professionals).

Since opening, Université des Montagnes (UdM) has enjoyed the strong support and goodwill of the Cameroonian public and an international network of supporters, mainly from the Cameroonian diaspora and associated sympathizers. Within 10 years of its existence, the student population of UdM includes all 10 regions of Cameroon and at least 10 other countries in Africa.

UdM currently operates from three locations in the town of Bagangté. A 2-hectare site of Mfetum in the city centre initially hosted the pioneer students, administrative and staff offices, and the library. A second site (Chougo) in the same city houses lecture halls and laboratories. However, the permanent 204-hectare campus at Banekane along the Bagangté-Yaoundé highway will eventually accommodate all the facilities of UdM after an infrastructure investment program of US$8 million has been completed. The permanent campus will include a sports complex, a 300-seat university restaurant, a 240-bed students lodging facility, administrative & teaching blocks, & staff residence.

== Faculties ==
Three schools are operational at UdM:

=== Faculty of Health Sciences ===
This faculty offers 12 training courses:

==== Medical and Health sciences (SMS) ====
- Human Medicine
- Pharmacy
- Dental Surgery
- Health Sciences
- Medical Biology (Laboratory Professionals)
- Rehabilitation (Physiotherapy)
- Medical Imaging
- Reproductive Health (Accoucheurs)
- Nursing

==== Agriculture and Veterinary Medicine (Agro-Vet) ====
- Veterinary Medicine
- Agronomy and Agroforestry
- Environment and Climate Change

=== Faculty of Science and Technology ===
The Faculty of Science and Technology proposes:

Seven majors leading to the Bachelor in the following:

- Computers, Networks and Telecommunications
- Mathematics and Computer Science Applied in Finance / Actuarial
- Biomedical Engineering
- Renewable Energies and Climate Engineering
- Mechanical Engineering
- Civil Engineering
- Architecture/City Planning

Two courses leading to the Master in the following:

- Computer Engineering and Systems
- Biomedical Engineering
- Agronomy and Agroforestry
- Environment and Climate Change
- Medical Imaging
- Renewable Energies and Climate Engineering
- Mathematics and Computer Science Applied in Finance / Actuarial

Doctorates in the following majors are offered:

- Human Medicine
- Pharmacy
- Dental Surgery
- Veterinary Medicine

The training in these courses is organized in three semesters of common core followed by three others of specialty. The Bachelor of Technology degree offers students adequate skills for their integration into the socioprofessional world, with the possibility of a continuation of studies in the cycle of Master Engineer and Doctorate.

Degrees offered:

- Professional License
- Master in Technology

Note: UdM is the first institution in Cameroon to offer training in Biomedical Engineering, and Mathematics and Computer Science Applied to Finance and Actuarial sciences.

== The Institute of African Studies ==
Recently opened in October 2016 (9 years ago).

== Hospital ==
UdM has an application hospital for its medical sector: The "Clinique Universitaire des Montagnes" (CUM).
