= Njacko Backo =

Cameroonian musician

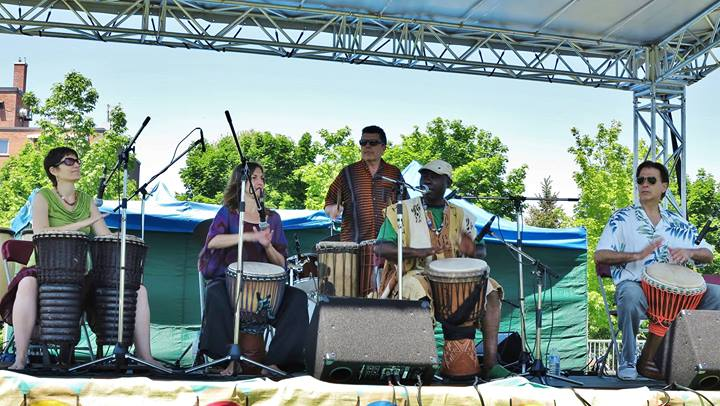
- Backo at the Mihadi International Drumming Day, Toronto, 2013

Background information
- Born: 1958 (age 67–68); Bazou, Cameroon
- Instruments: Kalimba (lamellophone), African Harp
- Website: www.njackobacko.com

Njacko Backo is a musician, poet, writer, composer, performer, and choreographer from Cameroon. He was born in 1958 and raised in a very musical family. He spent most of his childhood in a village called Bazou in western Cameroon where he was introduced to music. Like most children in his village, he began playing percussion and making instruments. However, with his Grandmother's assistance, Njacko met with the elders of the village who taught him to play music. He studied drumming (toum and kak), kalimba (also called the thumb piano, however, he plays with his fingers), percussion (various instruments), and an African harp called zaa koua.

== Personal life ==
Njacko was born in 1958 Bazou, Cameroon. At the age of 16 or 17 he left Cameroon and travelled around West Africa, then France before settling in the Netherlands. In Toronto, he met environmental engineer Val Woloshyn with whom he started a relationship.

His daughter Clark Backo is an actress.

Njacko currently lives in Toronto, Ontario.

== Career ==
Njacko is a musician who makes his instruments and is one of the new Kalimba players in the Western world. He also plays the Zaa Koua.

He has worked with African artists, including the late Boubacar Diabaté, Oumar Diayé, and dancer Zab Maboungo. He formed his band Njacko Backo and Kalimba Kalimba in 1990 and has independently released a total of 11 full-length albums to date. Njacko has performed at the Montreal Jazz Festival, the Louisiana Folk Festival (Lafayette, LA), and the Houston International Jazz Festival (Houston, TX), among countless other events. He has also composed music for films including To Walk with Lions, Born Free, and Spirit in the Tree. In addition to music, Njacko also teaches extensively in the Greater Toronto Area through an organization called Mariposa in the Schools. He has produced three instructional African drumming CDs and instructional DVDs. On October 20, 2022, Backo went to the DSBN Academy for a massive presentation in front of thousands of people, about Cameroon and the instruments that he plays.

=== Discography ===
==== Albums ====
- Bamileke Reggae (1986)
- Le Destin (1988)
- Aventure au Desert (1989–1992)
- Resurrection (1987–1992)
- Nkoni (1996)
- Lode Yeuk (1999)
- Kakoua (2000)
- The Conscience of Africa (2003)
- Ba Ba Oh (2006)
- Ou est l’Amour [Where is the Love] (2011)
- Ici Bas Rien Nest Impossible (2013)

===== CDs and DVDs =====
- J'aime mon école (2019)
- À Tous Les Enfants De La Terre (2019)

== Awards, nominations, and honorary mentions ==
- Fiati Memorial Award for Best Traditional Performance from Toronto-based Music Africa (1999)
- First prize in the 17th Annual Billboard World Song Contest for his song "Afrique Réveille Toi."
- Nominated for a 2013 Canadian Folk Music Award (World Group of the Year) for album "Ici Bas, Rien N’est Impossible"
- Honorable mention in the World Music category of the 2006 International Songwriting Competition and 15th Annual Billboard World Song Contest for his song "Mama Oh".
- Nominated for a 2021 Canadian Juno Award (Children's Album of the Year) for the album "J'aime mon école" (with Kalimbas at Work)
