= Medumba language =

Grassfields language of Cameroon

Medumba
- Ncob mə̀dʉ̂mbὰ
- Region: Cameroon
- Ethnicity: Bamileke
- Native speakers: (210,000 cited 1991)
- Language family: Niger–Congo?: Atlantic–Congo; Volta-Congo; Benue–Congo; Bantoid; Southern Bantoid; Grassfields; Eastern Grassfields; Mbam-Nkam; Bamileke; Medumba
- Dialects: Batongtou

Language codes
- ISO 639-3: byv
- Glottolog: medu1238

Medumba (Mə̀dʉ̂mbɑ̀, pronounced [mə̀ɟʝʉ̂ᵐbɑ̀]) is a Bamileke language of Cameroon. The people who speak it originate from the Nde division of the West Region of the country, with their main settlements in Bangangté, Bakong, Bangoulap, Bahouoc, Bagnoun and Tonga. It is a major Bamileke language, and is located in an area where sacred kingship played a pivotal role in government, justice, and diplomacy. The modern history of the Bamileke area, which was a German colony placed under French trusteeship by the League of Nations in 1919, is closely associated with the nationalist movement of the Union des Populations du Cameroun (UPC), which developed primarily in the coastal hinterland (Bassa) and the western highlands (Bamileke). From 1956 to the late 1960s, this area of Cameroon experienced a period of unrest; this episode continues to shape Bamileke political culture, and has an impact on language identity and the linguistic landscape.

The Medumba-speaking area is famous for a bi-annual cultural festival — Festival des arts et de la culture medumba ('Medumba Arts and Crafts Festival') — that promotes the Medumba language, as well as dance, artwork and food styles of the fourteen different villages of the locality. The festival, which takes place over a 2-week period in early July, is hosted in Bangangte.

== Language resources ==
=== Scholarship on the Bamileke cluster ===
Medumba is part of the Eastern Group of the Bamileke Cluster, which also include Fe'fe', Ghomálá', Kwa', and Nda'nda'. The Bamileke cluster — along with Ngemba, Nkambe and Nun — is part of the Eastern Grassfields subgroup which, together with the Ring languages and the Southwest Grassfields languages, constitute the Grassfield language grouping.

Medumba figures prominently in linguistic research on the Bamileke cluster, partly because of the high quality of the work done by Jan Voorhoeve in the 1960s and 1970s, including work on (in chronological order):

- morpheme structure constraints (Voorhoeve 1965)
- personal pronouns (Voorhoeve 1967)
- noun classes (Voorhoeve 1967 and 1969)
- tone of nouns (Voorhoeve 1971)
- traditional Bamileke narratives (Voorhoeve 1976)
- general linguistic description of the Bangangte dialect (Voorhoeve 1977)

This work was pursued by L. Hyman in the 1980s, on the closely related language Fe'fe' (add refs). It was re-invigorated in the early 2010s by research groups at Boston University (led by C. O'Connor) and at the University of British Columbia (led by R.-M. Déchaine). Some of these publications include:

- [add refs]

Also notable are the scholarly contributions of Medumba speaker-linguists, including (in chronological order):

- Keupdjio 2011, MA thesis (University of Yaounde) on content questions
- Kouankem 2011, PhD dissertation (University of Yaounde) on nominal syntax
- Kouankem 2013 on concord

Recent work on Medumba is part of a more general push towards documenting the languages of Africa, in the face of rising levels of language endangerment. Cameroon — along with Nigeria, Sudan, and Ethiopia — is reported to have one of the highest language mortality rates in Africa.

=== Literacy and orthography ===
Efforts to develop a Medumba orthography date back to the beginning of the 20th century, and are associated with the following milestones:

- 1926: Protestant missionaries develop an orthography for use in primary schools to facilitate the penetration of the Christian Bible in the region.
- 1957: The French administration prohibits the use of local languages in the territories of the Union Française.
- 1973, 20 December: CEPOM (Comité de Langue pour l'Etude et la Production des Œuvres Bamiléké-Medumba) is created; its mission is to promote research on Medumba and develop literacy materials.

Currently, educational materials, literature and dictionaries for the language are produced by CEPOM, based in Bangangte. The combined output of missionary and CEPOM work has produced more than 80 publications on Medumba language and culture; these are published in French, English, and Medumba. Over time, publications in Medumba have used six different orthographies:

- 1926: published in a collection of 12 songs
- 1945: published in a book on religious history (Nu Yawe Nsi) and a syllabary
- 1967: publication of the New Testament (Kàn nswe) and Tshô Pangante
- 1973: publication of Cam Medumba and zi'te nkite
- 1979: publication of Mbwog NkUd MedUmbA and Tons, Textes...
- 1985, 2 February: adoption of the current orthography at the 4th CEPOM Council

The current alphabet is given in the following table.

Alphabet
Uppercase	A	Ɑ	B	C	D	Ə	E	Ɛ	F	G	Gh	H	I	J	K	L	M	N	Ŋ	O	Ɔ	S	Sh	T	Ts	U	Ʉ	V	W	Ny	Y	Z	ʼ
Lowercase	a	ɑ	b	c	d	ə	e	ɛ	f	g	gh	h	i	j	k	l	m	n	ŋ	o	ɔ	s	sh	t	ts	u	ʉ	v	w	ny	y	z	ʼ
IPA symbol	a	ɑ	b	tʃ	d	ə	ɪ	ɛ	f	g	ɣ	x	i	ɟ	k	l	m	n	ŋ	o	ɔ	s	ʃ	t	ʦ	u, ʊ	ʉ	v	w	ɲ	j	z	ʔ

In addition to simplex consonants, Medumba has numerous complex consonants, and these are represented as digraphs or trigraphs; see Table 2. Nasals, stops, and fricatives can be labialized; in the orthography this is represented as a CW digraph. Stops and fricatives can be pre-nasalized; in the orthography this is represented as an NC digraph or an NCW trigraph.

Table 2. Orthographic conventions for complex consonants
	Labialized consonants									Pre-nasalized consonants															
	nasals		stops					fricatives		stops												fricatives			
	nasals		voiced			voiceless		fricatives		voiced							voiceless					fricatives			
Uppercase	Nw	Ŋw	Bw	Jw	Gw	Cw	Kw	Fw	Sw	Mb	Mbw	Nd	Nj	Nj	Ŋg	Ŋgw	Nt	Nc	Ncw	Ŋkw	Ŋkw	Mf	Mfw	Ns	Nsw
Lowercase	nw	ŋw	bw	jw	gw	cw	kw	fw	sw	mb	mbw	nd	nj	njw	ŋg	ŋgw	nt	nc	ncw	ŋk	ŋkw	mf	mfw	ns	nsw
IPA symbol	ɲʷ	ŋʷ	bʰ	ɟʷ, ʒʷ	gʷ	tʃʷ	kʷ	fʷ	sʷ	ᵐb	ᵐbʰ	ⁿd	ᶮɟ,ⁿʒ	ᶮɟʷ,ⁿʒʷ	ᵑg	ᵑgᵂ	ⁿt	ᶮc	ᶮcᵂ	ᵑk	ᵑkᵂ	ᵐf	ᵐfᵂ	ⁿs	ⁿsᵂ

Orthographic conventions for tone-marking are as follows:

- High-tone is not marked.
- Low-tone is marked as a grave accent on the vowel, e.g. à.
- Rising Low-High is marked as a caron on a single vowel, e.g. ɛ̌.
- Falling High-Low is marked as circumflex on a single vowel, e.g. ʉ̂.

Recent developments in digital literacy have had an impact on Medumba. For example, a seven-language electronic calendar — in French, English, and the five national languages (Medumba, Ghomala, Yemba, Meta, Kom) — sends information on time and date to an LCD screen via a VGA controller. The calendar has been developed as a way of mitigating the impact of language competition, and with the specific goal of raising the profile and prestige of the national languages in a context of language endangerment.

=== Media ===
Radio Medumba Bangangté was established in 2000 by Kum Ntsi' Medumba.

== Phonology ==
=== Vowels ===
According to Voorhoeve (1965) and Voorhoeve (1977), Medumba has 12 phonemic simple vowels given in the following inventory:

Simple vowels
		Front	Central	Back
Closed (High)	+ATR	i	ʉ	u
Closed (High)	-ATR	ɪ		ʊ
Mid (Non-high)	Close	e	ə	o
Mid (Non-high)	Open	ɛ		ɔ
Mid (Non-high)	Low	a		ɑ

Additionally, Medumba has five phonemic diphthongs: /ia/, /ʉa/, /iə/, /ʉɑ/, and /uɑ/.

=== Consonants ===
The following table gives the simple phonemic consonants in Medumba according to Voorhoeve (1965). Consonants in parentheses are phonemic but extremely rare.

Simple consonants
		Labial	Alveolar	Palatal	Velar	Glottal
Nasal		m	n	ɲ	ŋ	
Stop	voiced	b	d	ɟ	ɡ	
Stop	voiceless		t	c	k	ʔ (Note: Occurs only in coda positions.)
Trill		ʙ				
Fricative	voiced	(v)	(z)			
Fricative	voiceless	f	s	(ʃ)		
Approximant		w		j		

Only nasals, /b/, /d/, /g/, and /ʙ/ appear in both onset and coda positions.

Approximants /w, j/ also may occur according to Nganmou (1991).

In addition to simple consonants Medumba has a large number of consonants with secondary articulation. Complex consonants only occur in onset position. The inventory of complex consonants according to Voorhoeve (1965) is:

Complex consonants
			Labial	Alveolar	Palatal	Velar
labialized	nasal				ɲʷ	ŋʷ
labialized	stop	voiced	bʷ		ɟʷ	gʷ
labialized	stop	voiceless			cʷ	kʷ
labialized	fricative			sʷ		
pre-nasalized	trill		ᵐʙ			
pre-nasalized	plosive	voiced	ᵐb	ⁿd	ᶮɟ	ᵑg
pre-nasalized	plosive	voiceless		ⁿt	ᶮc	ᵑk
pre-nasalized	fricative		ᵐf	ⁿs		
pre-nasalized labialized	plosive	voiced	ᵐbʷ		ᶮɟʷ	ᵑgʷ
pre-nasalized labialized	plosive	voiceless			ᶮcʷ	ᵑkʷ
pre-nasalized labialized	fricative			ⁿsʷ		

Full consonant chart with secondary articulation
		Labial		Alveolar		Palatal		Velar		Glottal
		plain	Lab.	plain	Lab.	plain	Lab.	plain	Lab.	Glottal
Nasal		m		n		ɲ	ɲʷ	ŋ	ŋʷ	
Stop	voiced	b	bʷ	d		ɟ	ɟʷ	ɡ	gʷ	
Stop	voiceless			t		c	cʷ	k	kʷ	ʔ (Note: Occurs only in coda positions.)
Stop	pre-nasalised			ⁿt		ᶮc	ᶮcʷ	ᵑk	ᵑkʷ	
Stop	pre-nasalised v.	ᵐb	ᵐbʷ	ⁿd		ᶮɟ	ᶮɟʷ	ᵑg	ᵑgʷ	
Trill		ʙ	ᵐʙ							
Fricative	voiced	(v)		(z)						
Fricative	voiceless	f		s	sʷ	(ʃ)				
Fricative	pre-nasalised	ᵐf		ⁿs	ⁿsʷ					
Approximant			w			j				

== Morphology ==
=== Affixation ===
Medumba has several affixes including:

- the suffix -te, which attaches to verbs to derive the counterpart iterative form ('to verb regularly or repetitively'). While many -te forms have a counterpart base to which they may or may not be transparently related (1-10), many of them seem to be frozen forms, for which the underived no longer exists (11-22).
- homorganic nasal prefixal N-, which is found in two contexts:
  - it attaches to verbs to derive nouns
  - it attaches to verbs to derive non-initial verbs (e.g. after an auxiliary or the non-initial verb of serial verb construction)
- suffixal H-tone
- prefixal H-tone

Examples of iterative -tə: (1-10)
	IPA	orthography	gloss	IPA	orthography	gloss	source
(1)		bà L	'be red'		bà-tə LL	'change'	V1976:111
(2)		bɛd H	'crever, pierce, explode'		bɛd-tə HH	'ask'	V1976:112
(3)		cwed H	'wipe'		cwed-tə HH	'pick up'	V1976:114
(4)		fàg L	'rip'		fàg-tə LL	1. 'rip'; 2. to separate from each other	V1976:116
(5)		ghub H	'become quiet'		ghub-tə HH	'be late'	V1976:118
(6)		kùb L	'be covered with écailles'		kùb-tə LL	'escroquer'	V1976:121
(7)		làb L	'hit'		làb-tə LL	1. 'hit with small hits'; 2. 'thank, pray'	V1976:26 V1976:122
(8)	[lɑʔ]	lɑ' L	'to become angry'		lɑ'-tə LL	'reveal, show'	V1976:122
(9)		mɑ' L	1. throw; 2. project; 3. clothe again		mɑ'-tə LL	'cotiser'	V1976:123
(10)		tɛn H	'push'		tɛn-tə HH	'push with small shakes'	V1976:26

Examples of iterative -tə (frozen forms)
IPA	orthography	gloss	source
	ben-tə HH	'mend, pin up'	V1976:112
	fɛd-tə LL	'pour, empty'	V1976:116
	cwed-tə LL	'show'	V1976:114
	kòm-tə LL	'be amusing, provoke laughter'	V1976:121
	kwim-tə HH	'remember'	V1976:122
	làg-tə LL	'forgive, forget'	V1976:122
	lam-tə HH	'trick'	V1976:122
	len-tə LL	'safeguard, fructify'	V1976:123
	nyi'-tə LL	'shake'	V1976:125
	sag-tə HH	1. 'be dirty; 2. 'realize'	V1976:126
[sɛʔ-tə]	sɛ'-tə LL	'rub'	V1976:126
	tad-tə HH	'lie, mislead'	V1976:127

=== Tonal inflection ===
==== Nominal tone classes: LL, HH, HL, LH ====
Tone on Nouns: {LL, HH, HL, LH}: Voorhoeve introduced a non-segment tone in order to distinguish two different low tone noun groups and two different high tone noun groups. For instance, naʔ and mfən both bear a segment low tone, but their tonal realization is different in the context such as mə jən mfən ___. For instance, naʔ in mə jən mfən naʔ (I saw the child of the cow) bears a non-low tone, whereas mfen in mə jən mfən mfən (I saw the child of the chief) bears a low tone. He proposed a four-way distinction, L(L), L(H), H(L), and H(H) to account for the nominal tone groups Voorhoeve (1971:44–53).

Noun tone classes
Tone class	Surface tone	IPA	Orthography	Gloss
L(L)	L	[mfə̀n]	mfə̀n	'chief'
L(H)	L	[naʔ]	nà'	'cow'
H(L)	H	[mɛn]	mɛn	'child'
H(H)	H	[njwí]	nywi	'tree'
Adapted from Voorhoeve (1971:44–53)

==== Verbal tone classes: L, H ====
Tone on Verbs: {L, H}: The radical of the verb has only one tonal contrast, which is a Low and High contrast. The tone of radical may be realized differently in different contexts. For instance, a low tone verb that has a nasal prefix has a different tone from its non-prenasalized counterpart. Examples are provided to illustrate this phenomenon. [Give examples of CV, CVC, CV-L and CVC-L)

Verb tone classes
Tone class		Context 1: infinitive			Context 2: consecutive			
Tone class		Surface tone	IPA	Orthography	Surface tone	IPA	Orthography	Gloss
L-tone	CV	L-H	[kòó]	kòo	H-L	[ᵑkóò]	ŋkoò	'like'
L-tone	CVC	L-H	[kùmə́]	kùmə	H-L	[ᵑkúmə̀]	ŋkumə̀	'arrive'
H-tone	CV	H	[ʒú]	ju	H	[ᶮʒú]	nyju	'eat'
H-tone	CVC	H-H	[túmə́]	tumə	HH	[ⁿtúmə́]	ntumə	leave
Adapted from Voorhoeve (1965), Franich (2014)

The examples above show that the Low tone radical is realized as a high tone if the verb is prenasalized, whereas it is realized as a low-mid tone if the verb is not prenasalized. The High tone radical is realized as mid tone regardless of prenasalization. This effect is also found in Bamileke-FeʔFeʔ.

=== Noun classes ===
Voorhoeve identifies two characteristics of noun classes that surface in Medumba:

- Systems of pairings between singular and plural prefixes
- Concording nominal and prenominal prefixes

Voorhoeve also assumes that pronominal prefixes exist within the noun class system, with these prefixes consisting of inherent tone morphemes such as the left-edge floating tone. The added prenominal tone creates a tonal difference between singular and plural noun class pairs, with generation of the plural form created by the singular.

Noun classes can be detached by singular and plural pairs.

Voorhoeve ascertains that the nasal prefix serves as a distinguishing factor between singular and plural noun pairs. As seen in Table 19, this nasal prefix does not surface in all constructions, especially with singular nouns that are already nasal word-initially.

Table 12. Noun Class Pairs
Class	IPA	Orthography	Gloss
Class 1	[mɛ́n]	mɛ́n	'child'
Class 2	[bʉ́n]	bʉ́n	'children'
Class 3	[báàʔ]	báaʔ	'house'
Class 4	[mbáàʔ]	báaʔ	'houses'
Class 5	[bʰí]	mbʰí	'knife'
Class 4	[mbʰí]	mbʰí	'knives'
(Adapted from Goldman et al. (2015:99) and Voorhoeve (1976:13–14))

Other noun classes in Medumba, however, exhibit derivation from Proto-Bantu noun classes, which had a strict parallel between singular and plural classes. In comparing agreement systems of Bamileke languages, Medumba behaves independently from the expected system. Compared to Proto-Bantu noun classes, there seems to be a noun class merger in Medumba. This merger occurs through the compression of various Proto-Bantu noun classes into a generalized noun class in Medumba.

Comparing Proto-Bantu and Medumba Noun Classes
	Proto-Bantu Meanings	(Odden Forthc.)	Proto-Bantu Noun Class	Medumba Nouns Class	Example	
	Proto-Bantu Meanings	(Odden Forthc.)	Proto-Bantu Noun Class	Medumba Nouns Class	IPA	Gloss
singular	Humans, animate	*mʊ-	1	1	[mɛ́n]	'child'
singular	Animals, inanimate	*n-	9	1	[mbʰʉ́]	'dog'
singular	Plants, inanimate	*mʊ-	3	3	[tʃʰʉ́]	'tree'
singular	Various, diminutives, manner/way/language	*kɪ-	7	3	[báàʔ]	'house'
singular	Various	*di-	5	5	[bʰí]	'knife'
plural	Humans, animate (plural of class 1)	*ba-	2	2	[bʉ́n]	'children'
plural	Animals, inanimate (plural of class 9)	*n-	10	2	[mbʰʉ́]	'dogs'
plural	Plants, inanimate (plural of class 3)	*mɪ-	4	4	[ntʃʰʉ́]	'trees'
plural	Various, diminutives, manner/way/language (plural of class 7)	*bi-	8	4	[mbáàʔ]	'houses'
plural	Various (plural of class 5), liquids (mass nouns)	*ma-	6	4	[mbʰí]	'knives'
(Adapted from Voorhoeve 1976:13-14)

Proto-Bantu noun classes typically assign particular words to certain noun classes, but this is not exhibited in Medumba. This would imply the dissolution of strict noun classes like the ones found in Proto-Bantu, as the set noun classes are merging into one class, albeit still maintaining a noun class-like form. The flexibility of noun classes in Medumba could be correlated with inflectional morphemes acting as the noun class system, with these morphemes surfacing as left-edge floating tones.

Loan words are normally inserted into unrestricted noun classes. For example, látrɨ́, the loan word for "light" from English, can either be viewed as a mass noun or not, depending on the speaker. In the case of Medumba, this allows for any noun class to take a loan word.

In looking at interspeaker variation on the addition of loan words in Medumba noun classes, the instability of a formal noun class allows flexibility with speakers of various dialects This could be due to disagreement on how to lexicalize a new loan word between the various dialects. One such example is the loan word for "light", /látrɨ́/. While one speaker chose to pluralize /látrɨ́/ as /ndátrɨ́/, the other speaker refused to pluralize /látrɨ́/ as they believed it was a mass noun.

Younger speakers of Medumba are beginning to use forms of words that do not account for noun class, such as the first person possessive form /jɔm/. The first person possessive form normally varies depending on the noun it is possessing, such as in /látrɨ́-ɔm/ (my light) or /ndátrɨ́-t͡ʃɔm/ (my lights). It is unknown as to how much younger speakers know about noun classes and agreement.

=== Pronouns: simplex, possessive, complex, reciprocal ===
Bamileke distinguishes four sets of personal pronouns: simplex, possessive, complex, and reciprocal.

==== Simplex pronouns ====
Simplex pronouns are differentiated according to syntactic position:

- subject forms are V, CV, or CVC, and surface with Low tone or High tone
- object forms are V, CV, or CVC, and surface with Low toner or High tone
- elsewhere forms occur as indirect object, object of P, or in non-argument position (e.g. when topicalized by kí or focus-marked by á)

Singular pronouns
		Subject		Object		Elsewhere	
		IPA	orthography	IPA	orthography	IPA	orthography
1sg	H	[mʉ́]	mʉ	[mʉ́]	mʉ	[ɑ́m]	ɑm
1sg	L	[mʉ̀]	mʉ̀	[mʉ̀]	mʉ̀	[ɑ̀m]	ɑ̀m
2sg	H	[ú]	u	[wʉ́]	u	[ú]	u
2sg	L	[ù]	ù	[wʉ̀]	ù	[ù]	ù
3sg	H	[á]	a	[jí]	yi	[í]	i
3sg	L	[à]	à	n/a	n/a	[ì]	ì
(adapted from Voorhoeve (1967:422) Table 1, Columns I, II, II)

Almost all plural pronouns often begin with b-, which is a marker of plurality; see Table 15. The only exception to this is the 2pl pronoun jin, which is the elsewhere form (i.e. it is used with indirect objects, objects of prepositions, and for topicalization and focalization).

Plural pronouns
		Subject		Object		Elsewhere	
		IPA	orthography	IPA	orthography	IPA	orthography
1pl	H	n/a	n/a	[˚b-ág´]	bag	[˚jág-]	yag
1pl	L	[b-àg]	bàg	[˚b-àg´]	bàg	[˚jàg-]	yàg
1pl (inclusive)	H	[b-ə́]	bə	n/a	n/a	n/a	n/a
1pl (inclusive)	L	[b-ə̀]	bə̀	[b-ə̀n]	bə̀n	[b-ə̀n]	bə̀n
2pl	H	n/a	n/a	[˚b-ín´]	bin	[˚jín-]	yin
2pl	L	[b-ìn]	bìn	[˚b-ìn´]	bìn	[˚jìn-]	yìn
3pl	H	[b-ú]	bu	[b-ú]	bu	[˚júb-]	yub
3pl	L	[b-ù]	bù	n/a	n/a	[˚jùb-]	yùb
(adapted from Voorhoeve (1967:422), Table 1, Columns I, II, II)

The tone simplex pronouns depends on the following verb or auxiliary (for subject pronouns) or the preceding verb (for object pronouns). Examples of tone variation of pronoun in subject position (provide fuller description and edit examples). Example (1) illustrates 1sg mə, 2sg u, 3sg o, and 3pl bu also behave as in (1). Example (2) illustrate 1pl bag; 2pl bin also behaves as in (2).

mə kem men
1SG see child
'I saw the child'

mə ke? jen men
1SG NEG see child
'I did not see the child'

mə do jen men
1SG PAST.REC see child
'I just saw the child'

mə ke njen men
1SG ?? see child
'It was me who saw the child'

bag jen men
1PL see child
'We saw the child'

bag ke? jen men
1PL NEG see child
'We did not see the child'

bag do jen men
1PL PAST.REC see child
'We just saw the child'

bag ke njen men
1PL ?? see child
'It was us who saw the child'

(adapted from Voorhoeve (1967:423f))

Examples of tone variation of pronoun in object position (provide fuller description, edit examples put both IPA and orthography). Example (3) illustrates 1sg am; example (4) illustrates 1pl jag(e).

a dab am
3SG beat 1SG
'S/he beat me'

a na? ndab am
1 ?? N-beat 1SG
'S/he beat me a bit'

a ton am
3SG spy.on 1SG
'S/he spied on me'

a na? nton am
3SG ?? spy.on 1SG
'S/he spied on me a bit'

a dab jage
3SG beat 1PL
'S/he beat us'

bag ke? jen men
1PL NEG see child
'S/he beat us a bit'

a ton yage
3SG spy.on 1PL
'S/he spied on us'

a na? nton yage
3SG ?? spy.on 1PL
'S/he spied on us a bit'

(adapted from Voorhoeve 1967:425)

==== Possessive and appositional pronouns ====
The tonal structure of possessive pronouns depends on the tonal structure of the preceding noun.

Possessive and appositional pronouns
Specification		Possessive								Appositional	
Specification		with SG Nouns: 'X's N'				with PL Nouns: 'X's N-s'				Appositional	
Specification		IPA	Orthography	IPA	Orthography	IPA	Orthography	IPA	Orthography	IPA	Orthography
singular	1sg	[ɑ́m]	ɑm	[s-ɑ́m]	ɑm	[c-ɑ́m]	cɑm	[m-ɑ́m]	mɑm	[c-ɑ́m]	cɑm
singular	1sg	[ɑ̀m]	ɑ̀m	[s-ɑ̀m]	ɑ̀m	[c-ɑ̀m]	cɑ̀m	[m-ɑ̀m]	mɑ̀m	[c-ɑ̀m]	cɑ̀m
singular	2sg	[ú]	u	[s-ú]	su	[c-ú]	cú	[m-ú]	mú	[c-ú]	cu
singular	2sg	[ù]	ù	[s-ù]	sù	[c-ù]	cù	[m-ù]	mù	[c-ù]	cù
singular	3sg	[˚í´]	i	[s-ə́]	sə	[c-iə́]	ciə	[m-í]	mi	[c-iə́]	ciə
singular	3sg	[˚ì´]	ì	[s-ə̀]	sə̀	[c-iə̀]	ciə̀	[m-ì]	mì	[c-iə̀]	c-ə̀
plural	1pl	[˚j-ág´]	yag	[˚s-ág-]	sag	[˚c-ág-]	cag	[˚m-ág-]	mag	[˚c-ag-]	cag
plural	1pl	[˚j-àg´]	yàg	[˚s-àg-]	sàg	[˚c-àg-]	càg	[˚m-àg-]	màg	[˚c-ag-]	càg
plural	1pl (inclusive)	[b-ə́n]	bən	[b-ə́n]	bən	[b-ə́n]	bən	[b-ə́n]	bən	[b-ə́n]	bən
plural	1pl (inclusive)	[b-ə̀n]	bən	[b-ə̀n]	bə̀n	[b-ə̀n]	bə̀n	[b-ə̀n]	bə̀n	[b-ə̀n]	bə̀n
plural	2pl	[˚j-ín´]	yin	[˚s-ín-]	sin	[˚c-ín-]	cín	[˚m-ín-]	min	[˚c-ín-]	cin
plural	2pl	[˚j-ìn´]	yìn	[˚s-ìn-]	sìn	[˚c-ìn-]	cìn	[˚m-ìn-]	mìn	[˚c-ìn-]	cìn
plural	3pl	[˚j-ób´]	yub	[˚s-ób-]	sub	[˚c-úb-]	cúb	[˚m-úb-]	mub	[˚c-úb-]	cub
plural	3pl	[˚j-òb´]	yùb	[˚s-òb-]	sùb	[˚c-ùb-]	cùb	[˚m-ùb-]	mùb	[˚c-ùb-]	cùb
morpheme breakdown:		Agr-Pronoun		Agr-Pronoun		Agr-Pronoun		Agr-Pronoun		Agr-Pronoun	
(adapted from Voorhoeve 1967:422, Table 1, Columns IVa-b-c-d & V)											

Provide examples (see Voorhoeve 1967:426); use template from subject and object pronouns above.

==== Complex plural pronouns ====
Complex plural pronouns specify the composition of the group of participants denoted by the pronoun. [Provide fuller description; give examples form Voorhoever 1967:428); regularize IPA transcription]

1pl	baag-ɟi 1PL-3SG 'us: me+him'	bǎg-à-bo 1PL-LINK‍-3PL 'us: them/us+her/him/them'	bâg-uɨ 1PL-2SG 'us: me+you(sg)'	bág-à-bìn´ 1PL-LINK‍-2PL 'us:me/us+you(pl)'
2pl	bîn-jé 2PL-3SG 'you all:you(sg.)+him'	bín-à-bo 2PL-LINK‍-3PL = (i) 'you all: you(sg)+them = (ii) 'you all: you(pl+her/him/them'
3pl	bô-jé 3PL-3SG 'them:her/him+3her/him'	bó-à-bo 3PL-LINK‍-3PL = (i) 'them:her/him+them = (ii) 'them: them+her/him/them'
	(adapted from Voorhoeve 1967:427)

==== Reduplicated reciprocal pronouns ====
[Provide description] (say where there examples are from)

bǎg-bàg
1PL-1PL
'1PL, exclusive: 'us (us/me and them) between ourselves'

bən-bən
1PL.IN-1PL.IN
'1PL, inclusive: us (me and you) between ourselves'

bin-bìn
2PL-2PL
'2PL: you all between yourselves'

bó-bó
3PL-3PL
'3PL: 'them between themselves'

== Syntax ==
=== CP: clausal syntax ===
Medumba has a rich inventory of temporal and aspectual auxiliaries, and makes productive use of serial verb constructions. [Give examples]

==== Tense-marking ====
Medumba has finely articulated temporal contrasts, with up to 9 distinct past tense auxiliaries, and 5 distinct future tense auxiliaries.

==== Bracketed clause-typing ====
Medumba makes use of numerous clause-typing particles that occur at the beginning or end of the sentence: they are used to mark yes/no questions, content questions, relative clauses, as well as embedded clauses. In addition, there are two forms of negation, according to whether negation has scope over VP or CP: VP-scope negation is contrastive (e.g. He bought some books, but he did not sell pens); CP-scope negation denies the truth of a proposition p (e.g. NOT-p = it is not the case that p). [Give examples]

=== DP: nominal syntax ===
==== Associative N of NP construction ====
Associative noun constructions, which usually translated as 'Noun_{1} of Noun_{2}', as in bǎm mɛ́n ('belly of the child'), are analyzed with a floating tone interposed between the two nouns. The presence of this floating tone is reflected by the tone melodies borne by the nouns that precede or follow it. This associative tone, first hypothesized by Jan Voorhoeve, may be high or low depending on the class and tone pattern of the preceding noun. The tone may lower the pitch-level of Noun_{2} (a phenomenon called down step); or it may combine with the final vowel of Noun_{1}, resulting in a (rising LH or falling HL) contour tone.

For example, in (1), the first line represents the theorized underlying tonal melody of the two nouns, with the L tone associative marker in bold. The second line shows the two tones which are actually pronounced at the surface, with the pitch level shown in brackets (a very low pitch followed by a mid-range pitch). Likewise in (2), the first line shows the theoretical tonal melody of what at the surface are pronounced as a LH contour on Noun_{1} and a down-stepped high tone on Noun_{2}. Thus, in brackets we see a slash indicating a rise from low to high pitch, and a mid-level line indicating a mid-range pitch.

(1)    L-(H)  (L) (L)-H-(L))                    (2)    L-(L) (H) (L)-H-(L)
       L            H          [ _ – ]                 LH   ↓  H          [ / – ]
      nzwi           mɛn                              bǎm           mɛn
      nzwí           mɛ́n                              bàám        ↓   mɛ́n
      woman    of    child                            belly   of      child
     'the woman of the child'                        'the belly of the child'

(adapted from Voorhoeve 1971:50)

Examples (3) to (6) illustrate the realization of the associative in contexts where Noun_{1} is L-tone and Noun_{2} is H-tone. Whether or not Noun_{1} is theorized to be followed by a floating L or H tone has no effect on the surface form (i.e., the difference between (3) and (5), and (4) and (6)). What does have an effect is the tone of the associative marker—in (3) and (5) it is H, while in (4) and (6) it is L, resulting in an LH contour on Noun_{1}.

The effect that the associative tone has on either of the two nouns may be dependent on which floating tones accompany those nouns, which in turn is decided by their noun class. Examples (7) to (10) illustrate the realization of the associative in contexts where Noun_{1} is H-tone and Noun_{2} is H-tone. As with (3) to (6), in examples (7) and (9) we can see that the floating tone following the noun has no effect on the surface form—if the associative marker is H, then the surface form will always be two level H tones, or else an HL contour followed by an H tone, varying by speaker or dialect. In the case of (8) and (10), the floating tone which follows the noun does have a perceptible effect. In (8), the surface form is either an H tone followed by an L tone, or else an HL contour followed by a L tone (again, varying by speaker or dialect). However, in (10) the only available choice is a H tone followed by down-stepped H, demonstrating that the theorized underlying tones do have an effect on the pitch at which tones are actually pronounced.

Resolution of associative tone: L-tone Noun1 + H-tone Noun2
(tones in brackets () are floating)

(3)    L-(L)  (L) (L)-H-(L)                  (4)    L-(L)  (H)  (L)-H-(L)
       L              H          [ _ – ]            L       H    ↓  H           [ / – ]
     mfə̀n            mɛn                            bàm            mɛn
     ᵐfə̀n            mɛ́n                            bàá          ↓ mɛ́n
     1.chief   of    child                          5.belly of     child
     'the chief of the child'                       'the belly of the child'     

(5)    L-(H)  (L) (L)-H-(L)                  (6)    L-(H)  (H) (L)-H-(L)   
       L              H          [ _ – ]            L       H   ↓  H            [ / – ]
      nà             mɛn                            kɔ̀              mɛn
      nà             mɛ́n                            kɔ̀O         ↓  mɛ́n
      3.cow of       child                          5.spear of     child
      'the cow of the child'                        'the spear of the child'
     
(adapted from Voorhoeve 1971:50)

Resolution of associative tone: H-tone Noun1 + H-tone Noun3
(tones in brackets () are floating)

(7)    H-(L)  (L) (L)-H-(L)                  (8)    H-(L)  (H) (L)-H-(L)    [TYPO?, check] 
       H              H          [ ¯ ¯ ] or         H           L              [ ¯ _ ] or 
       H       L      H          [ \ ¯ ]            H  L        L              [\ _ ]
      mɛn            mɛn                           ju          mɛn
      mɛ́(ɛ)n         mɛ́n                           ʒú(ù)       mɛ́n
      1.child of     1.child                       3.thing of  1.child
      'the child of the child'                     'the thing of the child'    

(9)    H-(H)  (L) (L)-H-(L)                  (10)    H-(H)  (H) (L)-H-(L)   
       H              H          [ ¯ ¯ ]             H           ↓  H            [ ¯ – ]
       H       L      H          [ \ ¯ ]            cʉ                 mɛn
      nzwi           mɛn                            tɨ́         ↓  mɛ́n
      ⁿʒʷí(ì)        mɛ́n                            3.tree of     1.child
      ⁿzʷí(ì)        mɛ́n                            'the tree of the child'
      1.woman  of    1.child                                                 
      'the woman of the child'                        
     
(adapted from Voorhoeve 1971:50)

==== Post-nominal and pre-nominal demonstratives ====
Medumba demonstratives (the equivalent of English "this" or "that") include three elements:

- a noun (N);
- a demonstrative (Dem), which shows noun class with the noun;
- an obligatory "adverbial locative reinforcer" (Loc)

The normal (unmarked) order or demonstratives is postnominal, yielding [Noun-Dem-Loc]. Divergence from this canonical order is possible, so that [Dem-N-Loc] is also attested, and yields a contrastive focus reading, where the noun is contrasted with other deictic alternatives (this man, as opposed to that man).

Demonstrative concord
Noun class	Proximal (near speaker)	Example	Medial (near listener)	Example	Distal (far from listener & speaker)	Example
1	... yə̂n lì	mɛ́n yə̂n lì 'this child'	... yə̂n lá	mɛ́n yə̂n lá 'that child'	... yə̂n dín	mɛ́n yə̂n dín 'that child (over there)'
3	... yə̂n lì	bú yə̂n lì 'this hand'	... yə̂n lá	tə̂ntsə̀ yə̂n lá 'that calabash'	... yə̂n dín	tə̂ntsə̀ yə̂n dín 'that calabash (over there)'
4	... mə̂n lì	mìág mə̂n lì 'these eyes'	... mə̂n lá	mìág mə̂n lá 'those eyes'	... mə̂n dín	mìág mə̂n dín 'those eyes (over there)'
5	... sə̂n lì	sɔ̀ sə̂n lì 'this tooth'	... sə̂n lá	sɔ̀ sə̂n lá 'that tooth'	... sə̂n dín	fù sə̂n dín 'that medicine (over there)'
6	... cə̂n lì	bún cə̂n lì 'these children'	... cə̂n lá	bún cə̂n lá 'those children'	... cə̂n dín	bʉ́ cə̂n dín 'those dogs (over there)'
Adapted from Kouankem (2013:60)

==== Combining Nouns with Adjectives, Numerals and Demonstratives ====
Within the DP, there are 8 possible word order variations, taking into account the order of nouns, adjectives, demonstratives, and numerals. These are divided by Kouankem (2011) into post-nominal and pre-nominal variations. The possible word orders are:

Post-nominal word order variation

bun sɛŋkɛ kua {cən li}
N A NUM DEM
children black four DEM.PRX
'these four black children'

bun kua sɛŋkɛd {cən li}
N NUM A DEM
children four black DEM.PRX
'these four black children'

bun sɛŋkɛd {cən li} kua
N A DEM Num
children black DEM.PRX four
'these four black children'

(adapted from Kouankem 2011:234-236; identify pp. & example nos.)

Pre-nominal word order variation

mbwo bun kua {cən li}
A N NUM DEM
beautiful children four DEM.PRX
'these four beautiful children'

mbwo bun {cən li} kua
A N DEM NUM
beautiful children DEM.PRX four
'these four beautiful children'

cən mbwo bun kua li
DEM A N NUM {}
DEM.PRX beautiful children four ??
'these four beautiful children'

cən bun sɛŋkɛd kua li
DEM N A NUM {}
DEM.PRX children black four ??
'these four black children'

cən bun kua sɛŋkɛd li
DEM N NUM A {}
DEM.PRX children four black ??
'these four black children'

(adapted from Kouankem 2011:234-236; identify pp. & example nos.)

=== AP: adjectival syntax ===
There are three kinds of adjective classes in Medumba, which differ in their order relative to the noun they modify. [GIVE EXAMPLES]

==== Pure adjectives ====
There are a limited number of pure adjectives. These are further divided into two classes. Class 1 pure adjectives always appear before their noun. Class 2 pure adjectives typically appear after the noun, but can appear before the noun in a contrastive context. [GIVE EXAMPLES]

==== Nominal adjectives ====
[GIVE EXAMPLES]

==== Verbal adjectives ====
[GIVE EXAMPLES]

=== PP: Prepositional Syntax ===
Medumba has four locative prepositions: mbàŋ (next to), mʙəә́ (in front of), ɲàm (behind), and nùm (on).

While there are several strategies for forming prepositional phrases involving overt prepositions or "locative specifications", there are no overt locative prefixes which correspond to the Bantu locative classes (16), (17), and (18) (pa-, ku-, and mu- respectively). However, there is a ''covert'' prefix in the form of a floating H tone whose presence may be detected in certain contexts by its effects on the pitch of surrounding tones, which Voorhoeve hypothesizes that it may be the remnant of those locative classes. The interpretation of a noun marked with this tone is variable and context dependent, generally corresponding to prepositions like on, at, or in. [Give examples]

== Conventions for presenting Medumba language data ==
The following conventions are used to present Medumba language data

- symbols in square brackets [...] give the IPA form
- examples in italic give the Medumba orthography
- example sentences used the following format
  - line 1: orthography
  - line 2: IPA transcription
  - line 3: morpheme breakdown (called a "gloss" by linguists)
  - line 4: translation

Thus, example (1) is presented as follows:

me kem men
1SG see child
'I saw the child'

me ke? jen men
1SG NEG see child
'I did not see the child'

me do jen men
1SG PAST.REC see child
'I just saw the child'

me ke njen men
1SG ?? see child
It was me who saw the child'

bag jen men
1PL see child
'We saw the child'

bag ke? jen men
1PL NEG see child
'We did not see the child'

bag do jen men
1PL PAST.REC see child
'We just saw the child'

bag ke njen men
1PL ?? see child
It was us who saw the child'

(adapted from Voorhoeve 1967:423f.)
