= Bamena =

Village in Cameroon

Coordinates: 5.1629°N 10.4326°E

Bamena is a village in Ndé, western Cameroon.

== See also ==
- Communes of Cameroon
