= Bazou =

Coordinates: 5°04′N 10°28′E

- Commune and town
- Interactive map of Bazou
- Country: Cameroon
- Time zone: UTC+1 (WAT)

Bazou is a town and commune located in the West Region of Cameroon. The town consists of 63 villages, and is one of the three subdivisions of the department of Ndé. Covering around 250 km^{2}, it is located on the high plateau of Bamileke, 950–1400 m above sea level. The name Bazou comes from the Baze expression for walking because of the long migratory marches caused by frequent internal conflicts.

The economy is mainly based on agriculture and petty trade. Local attractions include many sacred sites and the hand-dug war trenches up to 21-km long.

== Geographical and regional situation ==
Bazou is 255 km from Douala and 25 km from Bangangté, the main town of the department of Nde. It covers an area of about 250 km^{2}, which is composed of a dense forest through mountains, high plateaus, and valleys on the southern and southwestern part bordering the department of Nkam. At the edge of the Littoral Region, Bazou is made up of large plains and savannas. It is bounded to the north by Balengou village, to the north-west by the villages of Batcha, Batchingou and Bamena, to the northeast by Bangoulap and Bakong villages, to the east by Bassamba village, to the southeast by Banoumga, to the south by Bagnun and Bamaha, and to the west and south-west by the borough of Nord-Makombe.

There is a clear contrast between the long ridgeline from Balengou to Bangoulap and the area of the Bazou hills, with steep slopes and the picturesque sites which were once occupied by the original settlers from the Tikar plain. The land is semi-forested and shrubby with a less dense hydrographic network than those of the surrounding areas. However, there are some rivers, sometimes with a history closely related to that of its people, notably: Nko'ofi (bridge over the tomb), Kouachou, Menondih, Makoua, Touboum, and Tsebon.

The proximity to the department of Nkam has led to the intrusion of traffickers seeking slaves and forced labor.

The climate is a tropical transition type strongly influenced by topography. Local climates range from hot, humid low-altitude areas with high rainfall in the south, to cold, foggy areas in the north. There is a four-month dry season from mid-November to mid-March and an eight-month rainy season from mid-March to mid-November. The average annual rainfall is 1300 mm. The number of days of rain varies between 175 and 220. The average annual temperature is between 15.8 °C and 24.5 °C, with peak temperatures reaching 37 °C.

== Economic activities ==
The economy of Bazou is mainly based on agriculture and trade. The main agricultural products include:

- Food crops: maize, peanuts, macabo, cassava, pineapple, pepper, gumbo, vegetables, yam, sweet potato, taro, bean, plantain, chili, solanum nigrum, okra and squash
- Cash crops: Robusta coffee, cocoa, Arabica coffee, and oil palm
- Fruit trees: safou, kola nuts, avocado, mango and citrus

Traditional artisan production is also prevalent, along with small-scale breeding of goats, poultry, pigs and rabbits. Goods are sold at local markets in Bagangté, Bafoussam, and Bazou.

== See also ==
- Communes of Cameroon
