= Bassamba =

Coordinates: 5°03′N 10°34′E

- Commune and town
- Interactive map of Bassamba
- Country: Cameroon
- Time zone: UTC+1 (WAT)

Bassamba is a town and commune in Cameroon.

Bassamba is a wind over the Niger Delta.

== See also ==
- Communes of Cameroon
