= Bangangté =

- Location in Cameroon
- Coordinates: 5°15′N 10°50′E
- Country: Cameroon
- Region: West Region
- Division: Ndé
- Elevation: 1,350 m (4,430 ft)

Population (2012)
  - Total: 29,584

Bangangté is a town and commune in Cameroon. It is the capital of the Ndé division of West Region. The town is primarily inhabited by the people of the Bamileke (Bamiléké) tribe.

It is home to the Université des Montagnes, a small private university focusing on health and technology programs.

== Transportation ==
Bus agencies to and from the main cities in Cameroon, such as Bafoussam, Douala and Yaoundé, have buses that leave several times per day.

== Market ==
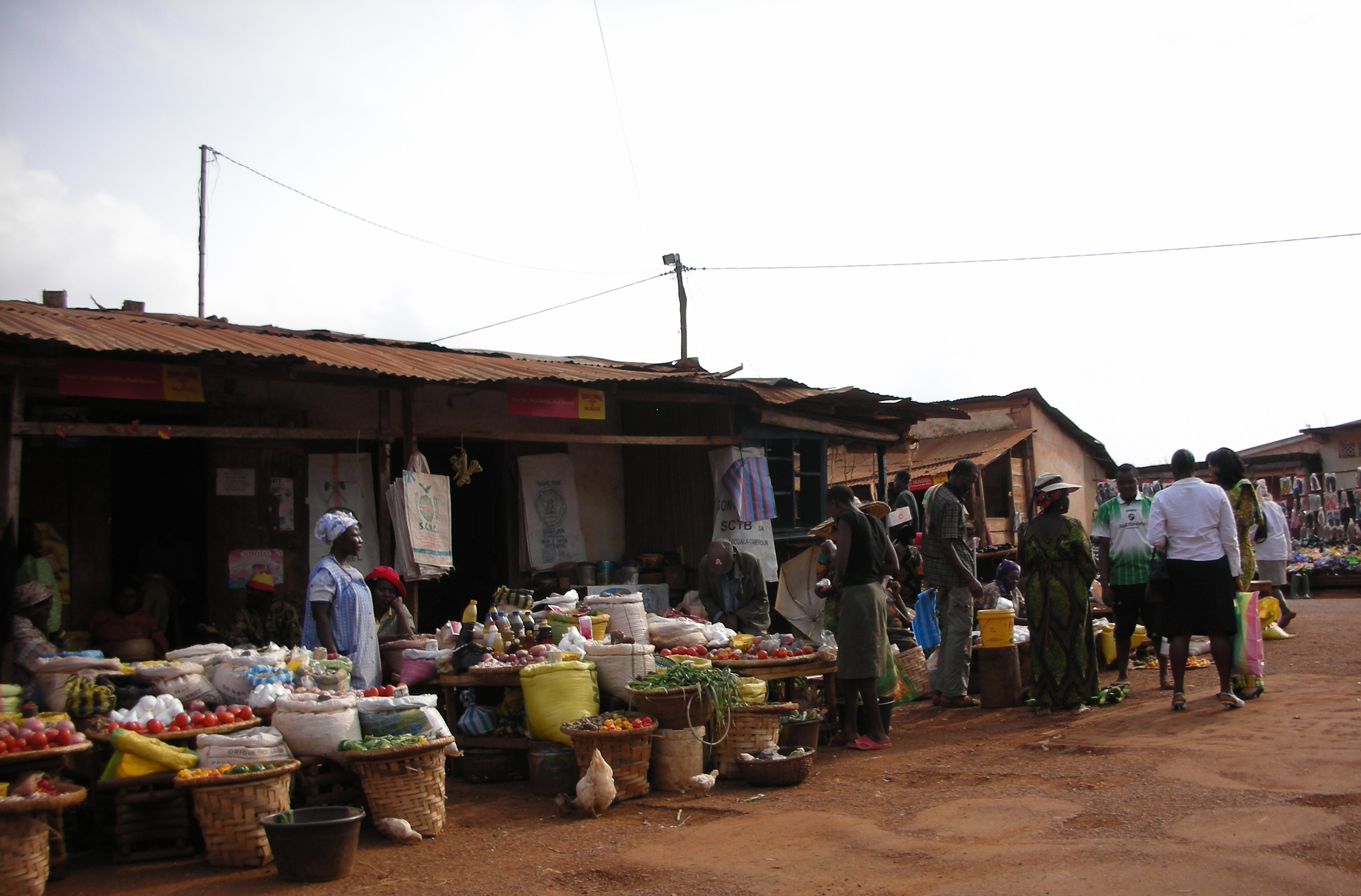
Marché A in Bangangté, Cameroon

There are two main markets in Bangangté: Marché A and B. Marché A is located in the center of the town and is open seven days a week and sells a variety of fresh produce, clothing, basic hardware supplies and electronics.

Marché B is located in a neighborhood south of the town center and is open Wednesdays and Saturdays. It generally has the same types of goods as Marché A, but many more vendors so prices may be lower.

== Traditional society ==
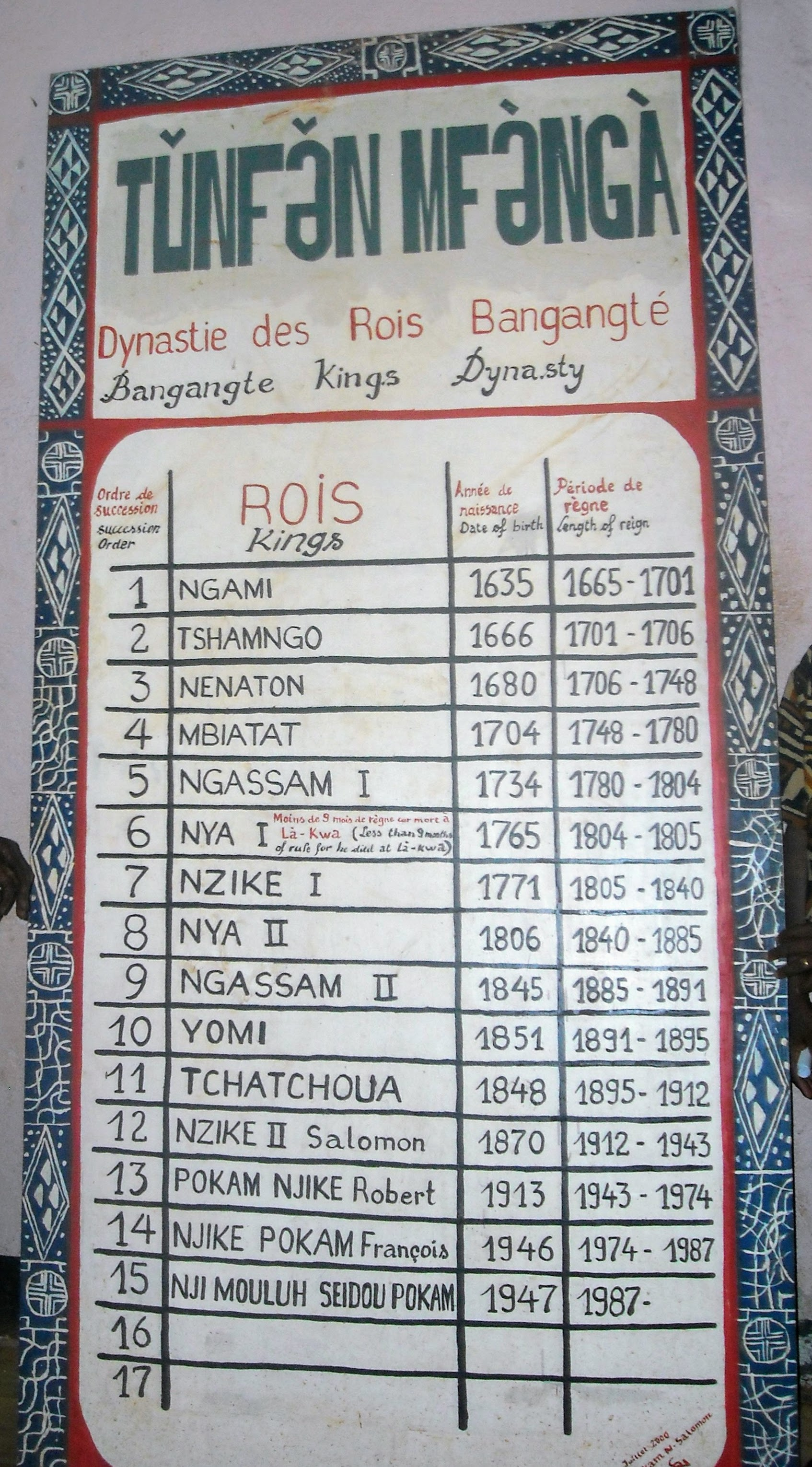
List of all the tribal chiefs / kings of Bangangté, Cameroon

The dominant tribal group is the Bamileke people. The traditional society is ruled by a tribal chief or king.

== Traditional chiefdom ==
The city is home to one of the eleven first-degree traditional chiefdoms in the West region of Cameroon:

The Chiefdom of Bangangte, with 29,135 inhabitants as of 2015.

The traditional chief of the Bangangte is His Majesty Nji Mohnlu Seidou Pokam, and the Queen Mother of the Bangangte.

An early source for the history is Egerton's book from the 1930s first published in 1938

The Bangangte district includes six second-degree traditional chiefdoms recognized by the Ministry of Territorial Administration and Decentralization:

725: Bangoua Chiefdom

726: Bamena Chiefdom

727: Bangoulap Chiefdom

728: Batchingou Chiefdom

729: Bangang-Fokam Chiefdom

730: Bahouoc Chiefdom

== See also ==
- Communes of Cameroon
