= Ndé =

- Division
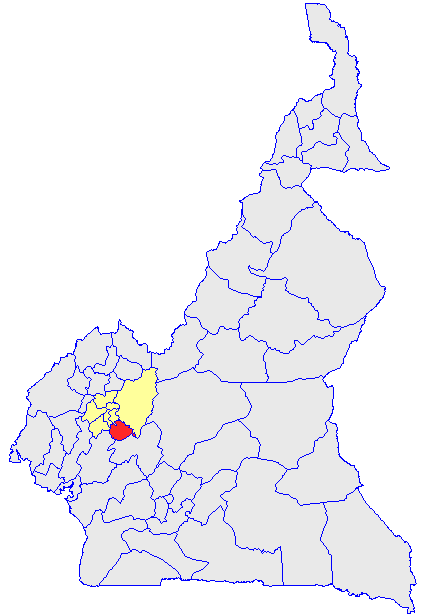
- Division location in Cameroon

- Location within Cameroon Location within Africa
- Country: Cameroon
- Region: West
- Capital: Bangangté

Area
  - Total: 588 sq mi (1,524 km^{2})

Population (2019)
  - Total: 304,800
- Time zone: UTC+1 (WAT)

Ndé is one of the 58 divisions in Cameroon. It is located in the West region of the country, about 150 km from Douala, the economic capital, and about 265 km from Yaoundé, the political capital. Its estimated population is 304,800. The term Nde is the name of a nearby river. Bangangte has been the headquarter of the Ndé division since June 14, 1961. Medumba is the most common language spoken in the region. Its kingdoms include: Bangangte, Bangoulap, Balengou, Bazou, Bakong, Bamena, Tonga (Badounga), Bahouoc, Bangang-Fokam, Bawock, Bangoua, Batchingou, Bamaha and Bagnoun. The main religious belief is Christianity, with the two main denominations being Catholics and Protestant. Its climate ranges between 14 and 22 Celsius at night and between 24 and 30 Celsius during the day. Some anthropological research has been done by Pradelles de Latour.

== Subdivisions ==
The department is divided administratively into 4 communes and in turn into villages.

=== Communes ===
- Bangangté
- Bassamba
- Bazou
- Tonga
- Balengou
- Bamena
- Bamaha
