= Xem =

Xem or XEM may refer to:

- xem, a personal pronoun, the object case form of the "xe" neopronoun
- Kembayan language (ISO 639 code xem), a language found on Borneo
- Xem (Marvel Comics), an alien race found in Marvel Comics
- XHBC-TDT, Mexicali, Baja California, Mexico; a TV station which formerly used the identification XEM-TV
- Little Games (album code XEM), a 1967 album by the Yardbirds
- Xem doctrine in the Temple of Set

== See also ==
- XEMS-AM, Matamoros, Tamaulipas, Mexico; a radio station
- Hem (disambiguation)
- Xe (disambiguation)
- Xer (disambiguation)
- Zem (disambiguation)
