= Lycée classique de Dschang =

Lycée Classique de Dschang
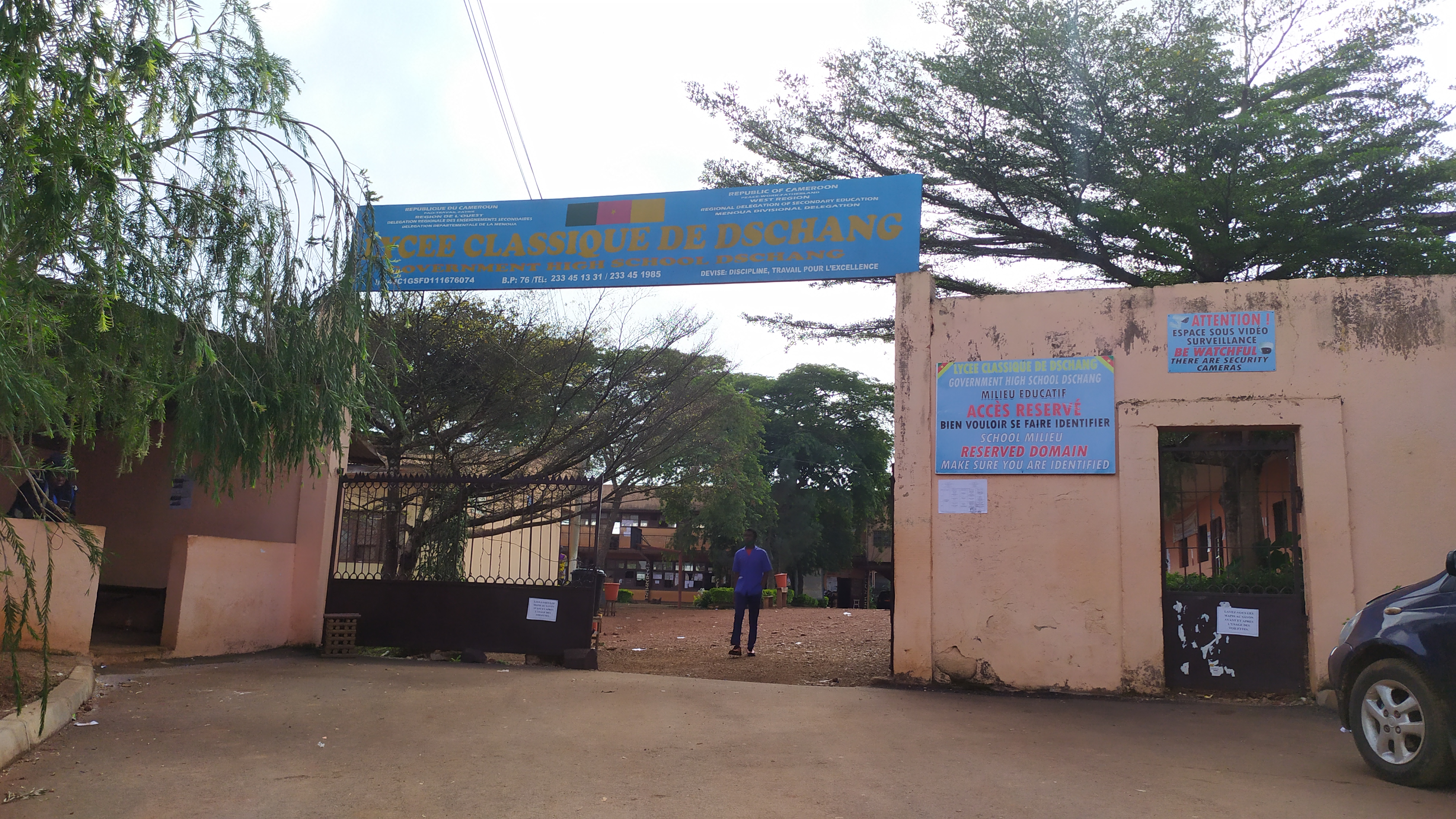
- Main entrance of Lycée Classique de Dschang

Location
- Dschang; Cameroon
- Coordinates: 5.455°N 10.064°E

Information
- Established: 1960
- School district: Menoua
- Staff: 100
- Enrollment: 4000

The Lycée Classique de Dschang is a public French-speaking secondary school founded in 1960 and located in the city of Dschang, the capital of the Menoua department, in Cameroon. It is one of the oldest schools in Cameroon.

== Ranking ==
In 2007, Lycée Classique was the public institution in the city of Dschang with the highest success rate in the baccalaureate exams, and the second highest success rate in the city overall. Nationally, its success rate generally places it among the top 70 schools (out of more than 500 ranked) in the annual ranking of colleges and high schools established by the Office du Baccalauréat du Cameroun (OBC).

== Enrollment and operations ==
The school has approximately 4000 students and around 100 teachers. In 2009, the school had 3844 students, including 2036 girls and 1808 boys, 106 teachers, and 46 classrooms.

Like many public schools in Cameroon, the lycée suffers from a severe lack of material and financial resources. The number of students per class can range from 60 to 120, with students sometimes having to share a single bench among three people, without a desk to write on. The school also lacks the means to purchase textbooks, forcing students to photocopy pages at their own expense, or even to copy the text of books by hand to study.

== Notable alumni ==
Several notable Cameroonian and international personalities completed their secondary education at Lycée Classique de Dschang. Notable alumni include:

- Landry N'Guemo, international footballer playing for Bordeaux in the French Ligue 1.
- Ernest Etchi, former international footballer.
