= Penny Black (disambiguation) =

The Penny Black was the world's first official adhesive postage stamp.

Penny Black may also refer to:

- Penny Black (album), by Further Seems Forever
- Penny Black (film), directed by Joe Hitchcock
- Penny Black (research project), a Microsoft Research project on fighting spam
- Penny Black, a 1984 crime novel by Susan Moody
- Penny Black, a fictional character appearing in DC Comics' Flashpoint story arc
- Pennyblack, a fashion brand owned by Max Mara
