= Penka-Michel =

Coordinates: 5°28′N 10°15′E

- Commune and town
- Interactive map of Penka-Michel
- Country: Cameroon
- Time zone: UTC+1 (WAT)

Penka-Michel is a commune in the West Region of Cameroon. It is found in the Menoua district, or department, in the West region of Cameroon. Penka-Michel is considered a part of Bansoa, a town between Bafoussam and Dschang. It is often referred to as 'Bansoa ville', or downtown Bansoa.

Penka-Michel is host to many Bamileke languages and dialects.

== See also ==
- Communes of Cameroon
