= Zem =

Zem can refer to:

== Name ==
=== Real people ===
- Roschdy Zem (born 1965), a French actor and filmmaker of Moroccan descent
- Zem Audu (fl. 2021–present), member of American rock band Bleachers

=== Fictional characters ===
- Zem, a character from Crash Bandicoot
- Zem (mattress), a character in The Hitchhiker's Guide to the Galaxy by Douglas Adams

== Other uses ==
- Nkong-Zem, a town and commune in Cameroon
- ZEM, a Portuguese Pop-Rock band
- ZEM, the IATA code for Eastmain River Airport, Quebec, Canada
