= Xe =

Xe or XE may refer to:

- Xenon, symbol Xe, a chemical element

== Linguistics ==
- Xe (pronoun), a gender-neutral pronoun
- Xe (interjection), or che, a typical Valencian interjection
- Ḫāʾ, a letter of the Arabic alphabet
- Xe (Armenian letter)

== Businesses and organizations ==
- XE.com, a currency and foreign exchange rate website
- Chi Epsilon (officially: ΧΕ; romanized: XE), a US national civil engineering honor society
- JSX, an airline previously known as JetSuiteX (IATA code XE)
- Academi, a private military company in US formerly known as Xe Services and Blackwater Worldwide

== Computing ==
- Oracle Express Edition, a database management system free to distribute
- XE series of the Atari 8-bit computers
- XE Delphi, a version of Delphi (programming language) released in 2010
- Intel Xe, product name for a GPU architecture, introduced c.2020

== Vehicular ==
- Jaguar XE, an automobile made by Jaguar
- Extreme E (FIA abbreviation XE), an electric offroad rally racing series
- Ford Falcon (XE), a full-size car made by Ford Australia
- Mosquito Aviation XE, single-seat home-built-kit heliocpter
- Indian locomotive class XE
- South African type XE tender locomotive
- XE-class submarine of the British Royal Navy in WW2

== Other uses ==
- Xe (album), a 2015 album by Zs
- Minolta XE, 35mm SLR photographic film camera
- Christmas Eve, in a common Japanese abbreviation
- XE variant of SARS-CoV-2, a subvariant of Omicron
- The ITU prefix for Mexican A.M. & shortwave radio stations’ call signs
- Xe Iaso, the creator of the software program Anubis

== See also ==
- Xem (disambiguation)
- Xer (disambiguation)
- XES (disambiguation)
