= Bassek =

Bassek is both a given name and a surname. Notable people with the name include:

- Bassek Ba Kobhio (1957–2026), Cameroonian filmmaker and writer
- Philomène Bassek (born 1957), Cameroonian author
