= XES =

XES may refer to:

- Grand Geneva Resort Airport (IATA airport code XES), Lake Geneva, Walworth County, Wisconsin, USA; a resort airport near Milwaukee.
- Kesawai language (ISO 639 language code xes), a language found in Papua New Guinea
- XHS-FM, Tampico, Tamaulipas, Mexico; a Mexican radio station originally known as XES-AM
- XES (film) a 2014 film project directed by Ram Gopal Varma
- Xbox Entertainment Studios, a video game developer
- Xerox Escape Sequence, a printer page description language
- Soft X-ray emission spectroscopy, a technique for determining the electronic structure of materials
- Cross System Extended Services, a component of IBM's MVS Operating System
- The "eXtensible Event Stream" interoperability standard, defined by IEEE 1849

== See also ==
- xe (disambiguation), for the singular of XEs
