= Hem (disambiguation) =

A hem is a sewn edge of cloth.

Hem or HEM may also refer to:

== People ==
- Eugene A. Hem (1933–2006), American politician
- Hem Bunting (born 1985), Cambodian marathoner
- Hem Khorn, Cambodian politician
- Hem Kiry (born 1980), Cambodian swimmer
- Hem Lumphat (1976–2020), Cambodian swimmer
- Hem Raksmey (born 1983), Cambodian swimmer
- Hem Simay (born 1987), Cambodian footballer
- Hem Thon Ponleu (born 1990), Cambodian swimmer
- Hem Vejakorn (1904–1969), Thai artist and writer
- Tore Hem (born 1944), Norwegian wrestler
- Hem, a figure in the Book of Mormon

== Places ==
- Hem, Denmark, a village in Skive Municipality in Denmark
- Hem, Netherlands, a village in the municipality of Drechterland in the Netherlands
- Hem, Nord, a commune in the Nord department in northern France
- Hem, Norway, a village in Larvik municipality in Vestfold county, Norway

== Other uses ==
- Hem (alleyway), a vernacular urban planning form in Vietnam
- Hem (knitting), the edge of a piece of knitted fabric that is parallel to the rows of stitches
- Hem (band), an indie folk rock band based in New York City
- Hem (sheetmetal), a border treatment of sheetmetal parts
- Habitation extension module
- Helsinki-Malmi Airport, in Finland
- Hemba language, spoken in the Democratic Republic of the Congo
- Hermann (Amtrak station), Missouri, United States
- Hem, a mythical creature likened to a hemaraja
- Hemeprotein
- HEM – European type of I-beam
