= Daniel Balsam =

American lawyer

Daniel Balsam is an American lawyer best known for his lawsuits against e-mail spammers for violations of Internet spam laws. Balsam has been filing lawsuits against spammers since 2002 and has earned over $1 million in court judgments. By filing lawsuits, Balsam aims to publicize the names of the principals who are profiting from spam advertising. He aims to make spamming less profitable and to cause companies to reconsider their decision to market products through spam. Balsam describes his practice as "cleaning up the Internet," although his critics accuse him of taking advantage of the legal system.

== Legal practice ==
Balsam decided to begin suing spammers after he became enraged by the volume of breast enlargement spam that he received while working in marketing. He began filing lawsuits in small claims court in 2002, initially seeing the lawsuits as a hobby. Balsam soon decided to make it his vocation and attended the University of California, Hastings College of the Law, from which he graduated in 2008.

By the time he graduated from law school, Balsam had filed several dozen lawsuits. He files lawsuits based on the spam he receives at his e-mail addresses. He now makes enough money from court judgments to support himself full-time. With the help of his attorney, Timothy Walton, he has won judgments of $1,000 per e-mail. Because most spam messages do not identify the company sending the message, it is often difficult to identify the source. Balsam is frequently faced with fictitious business names registered to post office boxes. Balsam was once awarded a $1.125 million verdict against a pornography company that had sent him 1,125 e-mails. He was not able to collect the judgment, however, because the domain registrar Tucows refused to identify the owner of the company that had sent the spam.

Most of Balsam's lawsuits are brought under California's anti-spam laws. Although many of his cases have been tried in small claims court, he filed the first spam lawsuit that was brought to trial in California Superior Court—Balsam v. Trancos Inc.—which is currently on appeal.

Among the companies that Balsam has sued in small claims court are Various Inc. dba Adult FriendFinder, Tagged.com, Deniro Marketing LLC dba AmateurMatch, and the Stockton Asparagus Festival.

== Lobbying ==
Balsam has been critical of the CAN-SPAM Act, arguing that it is not tough enough on spammers. He also believes that the U.S. government is not doing enough to enforce laws against spam. While still in law school, Balsam helped draft a bill (AB 2950) sponsored by California State Assemblyman Jared Huffman, which would have toughened California's anti-spam laws. The bill aimed to close what its proponents characterized as loopholes and tighten ambiguous language in Business & Professions Code 17529.5 to more clearly set forth what practices are unlawful, and to make it easier to bring lawsuits against deceptive spammers and spamvertisers. Although the bill passed the State Assembly, Governor Arnold Schwarzenegger vetoed it.

== Opposition ==
Bennet Kelley, an Internet lawyer whom Balsam has faced in court, has been vocally critical of Balsam's tactics.

Balsam also has been sued by ValueClick, Inc., twice and Bloosky Interactive, LLC, for allegedly violating settlement confidentiality and/or non-disparagement agreements very shortly after entering into a settlement. Balsam maintains that these suits are retaliatory.

== See also ==
- Anti-spam techniques
- Cost-based anti-spam systems
