= Francisco Santos (swimmer, born 1962) =

Portuguese Anglolan poet, swimmer, and writer (born 1962)

Francisco Lopes Santos
Personal information
- Full name: Francisco José Ribeiro Lopes dos Santos
- Nickname: Xesko
- Nationality: Angolan
- Born: 17 May 1962 (age 64) Luanda, Portuguese Angola
- Height: 1.78m (5 ft 10 in)
- Weight: 70 kg (154 lb)

Sport
- Sport: Swimming
- Club: Clube Desportivo Nun' Alvares; Clube Náutico da Ilha de Luanda; F.C.Belenenses

Francisco José Ribeiro Lopes dos Santos, known mainly as Francisco Santos (born 17 May 1962 in Luanda, Angola) is an Angolan/Portuguese multi-talented artist. He is known by many names in various industries. As a swimmer, he uses the name, Francisco Lopes Santos. In visual arts, he is known as Xesko. In poetry, he used the name Elias Karipande. In fantasy and science fiction, Francisco used the name Alan J. Banta, whose works were published in English and Portuguese.

As a sportsman, he represented Angola in swimming at the 1980 Summer Olympics (Men's 100 m Breaststroke and Men's 4 × 100 m Medley Relay).

He represented his country in other international games, including the Algiers 1978 All-Africa Games, the Moscow 1979 Seventh USSR Summer Spartakiade, and the Mexico 1979 Summer Universiade.

He was honored by the Angolan Olympic Committee in 2014 for being one of the first Angolan Olympic ambassadors.

== Biography ==
Francisco's parents were Portuguese, and immigrated to Angola in 1959, where he grew up immersed in the African quarters (musseques) of Luanda.

Since a young age, he was dedicated to the arts and sports. He began writing at 14 and painting at 16 years old (watercolours and Chinese Ink). In that time, he published some short stories and poems in several magazines and newspapers.

In secondary school, he was the founder and publisher of the magazine "The Bantalas" entirely dedicated to the arts (Fine Art Painting, Photograph, Prose and Poetry). He participated in a contest of Art Painting whose objective was the creation of a poster commemorative of the anniversary of the People's Movement for the Liberation of Angola (MPLA) obtaining the 1st place.

In sports, he obtained several titles of National Champion, in Swimming (consecutively from 1972 to 1980) and Chess (1977 and 1979). He also represented his nation abroad several times, being the last time in the 1980 Summer Olympics (Moscow).

Francisco abandoned politics when he moved to Portugal in 1986. In Portugal, he began a career as a musician under the name of Francis Riba, and created several musical groups, the better known being the psychedelic rock band ZEM.

From 1982 to 1999, he was involved in several musical and theatrical projects as a technician, musician, producer and director, writing several adaptations and two original pieces.

He graduated in the Soviet Union in 1986 in Chemical Engineering, where he frequented the courses of "Scientific Drawing" and "Creative Thought in Post-Modernism". In Portugal, he graduated in Data Processing, Systems Engineering and Programming. He also frequented the Courses of “Improvement in Painting Techniques for Oil Portraits”, promoted by the Fine Art-Painter Master Almaia, “Photograph and Graphic Design”, from IADE (Institute of Visual Arts, Design and Marketing), “Aesthetics and Theories of the Contemporary Art" and "Art Painting and Visual intervention”, from SNBA (National Society of Fine Arts).

He has an MA of Contemporary Fine Arts from the Sheffield Institute of Arts (Sheffield Hallam University), Sheffield, England, and has several works displayed in public places and he is represented in several private and official collections in Portugal, Russia, France, Spain, Brazil, UK and Angola.

== Works ==
=== Alan J. Banta ===
(Novel, Short story)

- 1976 – Exodus. ISBN 989-8085-10-X
- 1977 – Crossed fire I (A Travel to the Past) - Fogo Cruzado I (Uma Viagem ao Passado). ISBN 989-8085-11-8
- 1978 – Crossed fire II (Perhaps the Future) - Fogo Cruzado II (Talvez o Futuro). ISBN 989-8085-12-6
- 1979 – Crossed fire III (What Reality) - Fogo Cruzado III (Que Realidade). ISBN 989-8085-13-4
- 1981 – Zantar. ISBN 989-8085-14-2
- 1993 – Terrae Incognitae. ISBN 989-8085-15-0
- 1994 – Dreams (Short story) - Sonhos (Contos). ISBN 989-8085-16-9
- 1995 – Thoughts of Chom - Pensamentos de Chom. ISBN 989-8085-17-7

=== Elias Karipande ===
(Poetry)

- 1982 – The Rainbow Warriors - Os Guerreiros do Arco-íris. ISBN 989-8085-00-2
- 1984 – From Kabinda to the Kunene - De Kabinda ao Kunene. ISBN 989-8085-01-0
- 1986 – 24 Hours in the Life (Finally the Peace) - 24 Horas na Vida (Finalmente a Paz). ISBN 989-8085-02-9
- 1988 – Green - Verde. ISBN 989-8085-04-5

=== Xesko ===
(Poetry)

- 1986 – Putting the Points in the iis - Pontos nos iis. ISBN 989-8085-03-7
- 1989 – A Step in thin Ice - 1 Passo em Falso. ISBN 989-8085-05-3
- 1993 – Between God and the Devil - Entre Deus e o Diabo. ISBN 989-8085-06-1
- 1996 – Muses (A Lost Secret) - Musas (Um Segredo Perdido). ISBN 989-8085-07-X
- 2002 – Ambiguities - Ambiguidades. ISBN 989-8085-08-8
- 2006 – The Electric Zone of the Colors - A Zona Electrica das Cores. ISBN 989-8085-09-6

(Novel, Short story)

- 1998 – Cel, Angel or Demon - Cel, Anjo ou Demónio, ISBN 989-8085-18-5

== Selected exhibitions ==
=== Solo ===
- 1981 - "Freedom" Scientific Institute of Minsk (Minsk/Bielorussia - Ex. Soviet Union)
- 1982 - "Butterfly Effect" Humbi-Humbi, Art Gallery (Luanda/Angola)
- 2004 - "7 Shades of Gray" Café da Ponte, Docas de Alcântara (Lisbon/Portugal)
- 2008 - "E Pluribus Unum" First Gallery, (Lisbon/Portugal)
- 2009 - "Devaneios/Reveries" Gallery Vasco da Gama, (Loures/Portugal)
- 2010 - "Devaneios II/Reveries II" Gallery Fernado Pessoa, (Lisbon/Portugal)
- 2011 - "Transições/Transitions" Gallery Fernado Pessoa, (Lisbon/Portugal)

=== Collective ===
- 1978 - "Um Quadro para a Revolução" (A painting for the Revolution) Noble Room of the National Assembly (Luanda/Angola)
- 2005 - Military Hospital of Belém (Lisbon/Portugal)
- 2006 - "Coisas de Campolide" (Things about Campolide) (Lisbon/Portugal)
- 2007 - "1st National Exhibition of Fine Arts" (Lisbon/Portugal).
- 2007 - "Lembrar Abril" (Remember April - commemorations of 25th of April and the International Workers' Day) (Alcochete/Portugal)
- 2007 - "Viver Campolide" (To live Campolide) (Lisbon/Portugal)
- 2007/2008 - Arte Fora da Galeria (Art Outside the Gallery) (Alcochete/Portugal)
- 2008 - "Os 5 Mágnificos" (The Magnificent 5) Tic Tac Café (Alcochete/Portugal)
- 2009 - Puro Arte, (Vigo/Spain)
- 2009 - Artexpo NY, (New York/U.S.)
- 2009 - Art Meeting in London III, Gallery 118, (London/UK)
- 2009 - Poésie Visuelle dans Paris II (Visual Poetry in Paris II), Galerie Artitude, (Paris/France)
- 2009 - Galeria Aberta XVI (Open Gallery XVI), Museum "Jorge Vieira", (Beja/Portugal)
- 2009 - Around the Bull - Gallery Vieira Portuense (Porto/Portugal)
- 2010 - Transmission: Off Air, SIAD Gallery, (Sheffield/UK)
- 2011 - Global Echo: Artists in Print, Furnival Gallery, (Sheffield/UK)
- 2011 - Creative Sparks 2011, Furnival Gallery, (Sheffield/UK)

- 2007/8/9/11 - Alcarte (Alcochete/Portugal)

== See also ==
- Angola at the 1980 Summer Olympics
- Swimming at the 1980 Summer Olympics – Men's 4 × 100 metre medley relay
- Post-Modernism
- Contemporary art
- Modern poetry
