= Menoua =

- Department
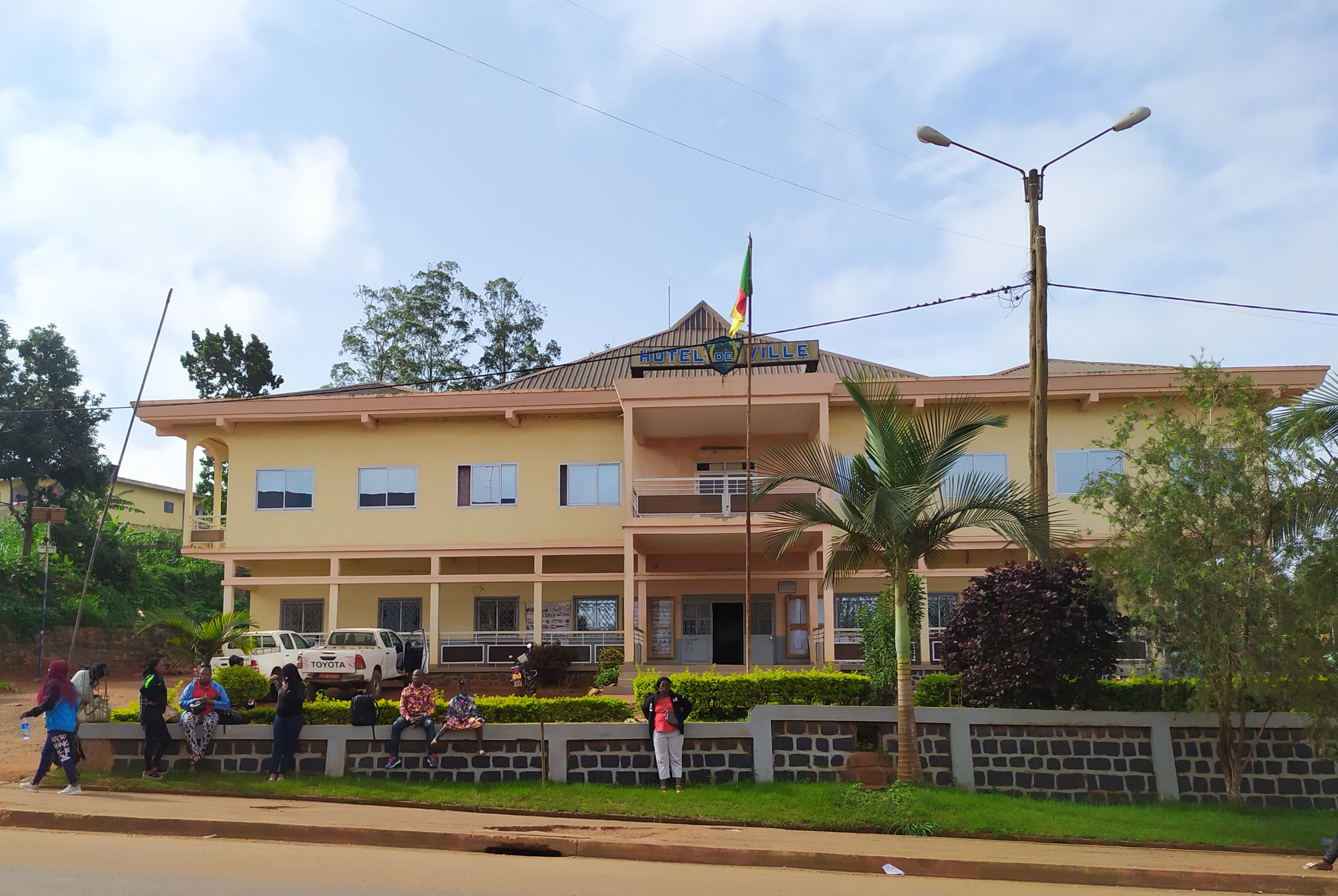
- Dschang City hall, capital of the Menoua department

- Location within Cameroon Location within Africa
- Coordinates: 5.3995°N 10.0655°E
- Country: Cameroon
- Province: West Province
- Capital: Dschang

Area
  - Total: 530 sq mi (1,380 km^{2})

Population (2019)
  - Total: 276,000
- Time zone: UTC+1 (WAT)

Menoua is a department of West Province in Cameroon. The department covers an area of 1,380 km^{2} and as of 2019 had a total population of 276,000. The capital of the department lies at Dschang.

== Subdivisions ==
The department is divided administratively into 7 communes and in turn into villages.

=== Communes ===
1. Dschang (urban)
2. Dschang (rural)
3. Fokoué
4. Fongo-Tongo
5. Nkong-Zem
6. Penka-Michel
