= Brigitte Tsobgny =

- Born: 1961 (age 64–65); Dschang, West Region, Cameroon
- Occupations: Writer, Teacher

Brigitte Tsobgny (born 1961) is a Cameroonian author of literature primarily for young readers, as well as an educator.

== Biography ==
Brigitte Tsobgny was born in 1961 in Dschang, in the West Region of Cameroon. She studied physics and pursued research and development of new materials for manufacturing industries. She also obtained a PhD in Sciences under the supervision of Jean-Jacques Videau, presented in 1989 at the University of Bordeaux, titled: "New thiohalogenide vitreous materials transparent in the infrared". In the preface of one of her works, she states:

I love mathematics as much as I love poetry or painting. How many times I have been ecstatic over a beautiful mathematical demonstration? How often I am obsessed with a mathematical problem, thinking of nothing else, losing sleep over it!

.

She then taught at the University of Réunion for three years, followed by positions in Belgium and France, all while dedicating herself to literature

As an author, she initially wrote tales and stories for children and adolescents, including Quand la forêt parle, Ponok-Ponok, Drôles d'histoires mathématiques, and Fotakou, un petit mensonge de rien du tout. Quand la forêt parle depicts the initiatory journey of a teenager in the African rainforest, questioning African traditions and offering cultural insights. Fotakou, un petit mensonge de rien du tout is also set in the rainforest. Ponok-Ponok, Drôles d'histoires mathématiques is a collection of educational stories

She later turned to writing for adults in a style that combines realism and poetry. Her first novel for adults, Rats, is a fable on human behavior, free will, and destiny, blending science and literature humorously. Two researchers observe and analyze the behavior of laboratory rats, imposing a rhythm of life regulated by their experiments. One day, a sewer rat infiltrates the laboratory. He tells his fellow rats about other possible lives outside and reveals that they are test subjects, prisoners of the researchers. Her second novel, Amours tyranniques, explores non-exclusive love, infidelity, and the sincerity of feelings candidly and implicitly. Some love scenes are quite explicit, as seen in the opening of the novel. Structured as a nested novel, the narrative gradually reveals unsuspected lives. In L'Afro-Parisienne et la suite arithmétique du Saigneur de Paris, an Afro-Parisian biophysicist attempts to decrypt the rituals of a serial killer. It indirectly analyzes French society, which makes life difficult for a quadragenarian of African origin, feeling marginalized due to her gender and Cameroonian origins.

== Selected works for young readers ==
- 1999: Quand la forêt parle, Acoria Jeunesse.
- 2002: Ponok-Ponok, Drôles d'histoires mathématiques, illustrated by François Warzala, Odin Éditions.
- 2004: Fotakou, un petit mensonge de rien du tout, illustrated by Augustin Détienne, Odin Éditions.

== Short story collection ==
- 2005: Face à pile: Mensonges, horreurs et splendeurs, illustrated by François Warzala, Odin Éditions. Eleven stories and a fable in the introduction.

== Selected novels for adults ==
- 2004: Rats, Odin Éditions.
- 2006: Amours Tyranniques, Odin Éditions.
- 2013: L'Afro-Parisienne et la suite arithmétique du Saigneur de Paris, Odin Éditions.
