= Ernest Etchi =

Cameroonian footballer

Personal information
- Full name: Ernest Etchi-Oben
- Date of birth: 4 June 1975 (age 51)
- Place of birth: Buea, Cameroon
- Height: 1.90 m (6 ft 3 in)
- Position: Centre-back

Senior career*
Years	Team	Apps	(Gls)
1995–1998	Cotonsport Garoua		
1998–1999	Lens	5	(0)
1999–2000	→ Châteauroux (loan)	24	(0)
2000–2001	Eendracht Aalst	21	(1)
2001–2003	Charleroi	35	(0)
2003–2005	Bnei Sakhnin	52	(3)
2005–2006	Ashdod	14	(0)
2006	Bnei Yehuda	11	(0)
2006–2008	Hapoel Bnei Lod	30	(0)

International career
1997–1999	Cameroon	17	(0)
- * Club domestic league appearances and goals

Ernest Etchi (born 4 June 1975) is a Cameroonian and a retired professional footballer who played as a centre-back.

He was a participant at the 1998 African Cup of Nations.

Etchi was born in Buéa, Cameroon on 4 June 1975.
