= Philomène Bassek =

Cameroonian author

- Born: Philomène Isabelle Mandeng; 1957 (age 68–69); Dschang, Cameroon
- Occupation: writer
- Notable work: La Tache de sang
- Children: 3

Philomène Isabelle Bassek (born 1957) is a Cameroonian author writing in French.

She was born Philomène Isabelle Mandeng in Dschang in western Cameroon and was educated at the University of Yaoundé. Bassek has lived in Yaoundé with her husband and three sons since 1970. She has taught at the Lycée Leclerc there.

Bassek published the novel La Tache de sang (The Stain of Blood) in 1990.
