= XER =

XER can stand for:

- XER (Villa Acuña), a radio station in the early 1930s in Villa Acuña, Mexico
- XER-AM (now XHR-FM), a radio station in Linares, Nuevo León, Mexico
- XML Encoding Rules, a set of ASN.1 encoding rules for formatting data in XML
- The ICAO Code for Xerox Corporation, United States

== See also ==
- Xe (disambiguation)
