= ZEM =

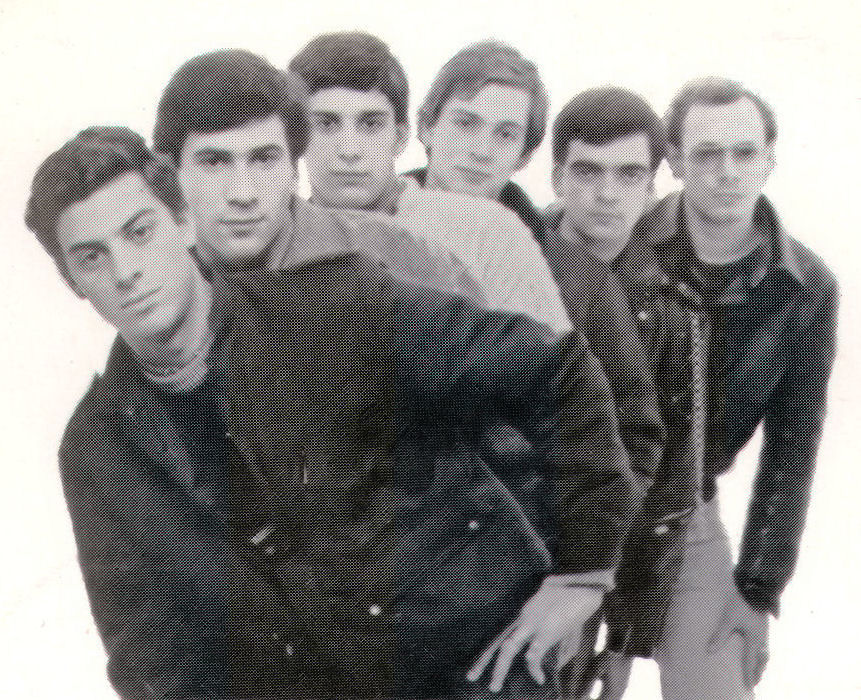
- Zem in 1987, (left to right): João Sanguinheira, Paulo Santos, Antonio José, To Gonçalves, Victor Bagoim, Francis Riba.

Background information
- Origin: Loures, Lisbon, Portugal
- Genres: Pop rock, space rock, hard rock, psychedelic rock
- Years active: 1982–1987
- Label: Discossete
- Past members: Francis Riba; João Sanguinheira; Victor Bagoim; Paulo Santos; Tó Gonçalves; Antonio José

ZEM were a pop rock group from Loures, Portugal. Formed in 1982, they were known as the pioneers of psychedelic rock in Portugal and innovative for their elaborate live shows.

== History ==
In 1982, Francis Riba, Joao Sanguinheira and Victor Bagoim formed the musical group Os Senhores (The Sirs). A few days later, Sanguinheira's friend, the drummer António José, joined the group. When Paulo Santos and To Gonçalves, both guitarists, then joined the band, the music began a more complex sonority.

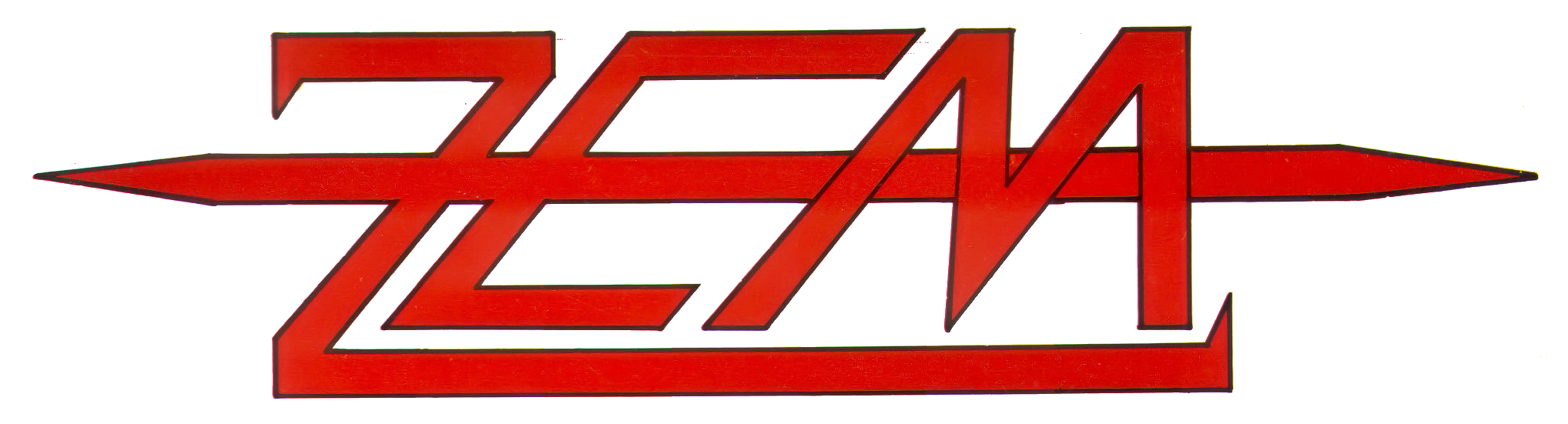
ZEM Logo

In 1984, they changed the name to ZEM. In March 1987, the band recorded their first single, "Louca Paixão" (Crazy Passion), and they became the first Portuguese group to have music in the record chart of the Lisbon-based radio station, Radio Cidade.

In 1981, they participated in the fourth contest of Rock Rendez-Vous, using the original name again, Os Senhores (The Sirs). They had to change the name back again, because they already had a record released, and the regulation of the contest only allowed the participation of groups without records.

In an interview to the music newspaper Blitz, after the participation in Rock Rendez-Vous, Francis Riba confessed he foresaw a dark future for the band, since his musical dreams were taking him to obscure places.

Their debut album, ZEM, was issued in November 1987. After that, the band was dissolved due to internal problems.

=== Members ===
- Francis Riba - (bass guitar, vocals)
- João Sanguinheira - (lead guitar, vocals)
- Victor Bagoim - (keyboardist, vocals)
- Antonio José - (drums)
- Tó Gonçalves - (guitar)
- Paulo Santos - (rhythm guitar, percussion)

== Discography ==
- March 1987 - "Louca Paixão" (single)
- November 1987 – ZEM (studio album)

== Notes ==
=== References ===
- (Book) Relação de Grupos dos Anos 80, Discossete, 1992
- (Newspaper) Blitz Nº30, Nº40, Nº43
