= Hem (knitting) =

Edge of knitted fabric that is parallel to the rows of stitches

A hem in knitting is the edge of a piece of knitted fabric that is parallel to the rows of stitches, as compared to a selvage, which is perpendicular to the hem and rows of stitches. Hems can be made in several ways.

The simplest approach is to bind off, possibly with decorative elements such as picots. This approach adds no extra thickness at the hemline (which is sometimes desirable).

Another approach amounts to a tuck: the fabric is folded over and the stitches are knit together pairwise with the stitches of a previous row. In this approach, the fabric is doubled along the hemline.
