= Penny Black (research project) =

Microsoft Research project on fighting spam

The Penny Black Project is a Microsoft Research project that tries to find effective and practical ways of fighting spam. Because identifying spams consumes a recipient's time, the idea is to make the sender of emails "pay" a certain amount for sending them. The currency or the mode of payment could be CPU cycles, Turing tests or memory cycles. Such a payment would limit spammers' ability to send out large quantities of emails quickly.

The project's name is derived from the Penny Black, the world's first adhesive stamp used for prepaid postage.

== Objective ==
The goal of the project is to move the e-mail costs from the receiver to the sender. The general idea is that if the sender must prove that they have expended a certain amount of effort specifically for the receiver and the message alone.

The project aims to devise a method to do this without introducing additional challenge-response mechanisms and third parties, and without requiring extra maintenance and updates, while retaining the current architecture of the e-mail system.

== Ticket server ==
One of the project's ideas was the "ticket server", a credit-based method for validating emails. Tickets would be required to perform actions, such as sending emails. There are three operations the ticket server provides: "request ticket", "cancel ticket", and "refund ticket".

The server would allow the user to request a ticket in exchange for a proof of work: expending CPU cycles solving hard algorithms with processing power, Turing tests, or even just by paying money. The server could also cancel a ticket. For example, after receiving an email with a ticket, the receiver could request the ticket to be cancelled so it cannot be reused. The person who cancels a ticket also has the option to refund the ticket to the sender. This causes the original sender to regain a new ticket. For example, a user might refund a ticket that came with an email if it was not spam.

Using this, friendly and trusted emails would have little to no cost as tickets would be frequently refunded. However, spammers would be required to invest either a lot of computing time or money in order to create enough tickets to send large numbers of e-mails.

== See also ==
- Proof-of-work system
- Hashcash
- Internet Mail 2000
- Anti-spam techniques
