= Nkong-Zem =

Coordinates: 5.2392°N 10.6249°E

- Commune and town
- Interactive map of Nkong-Zem
- Country: Cameroon
- Time zone: UTC+1 (WAT)

Nkong-Zem is a town and commune in Cameroon.

== See also ==
- Communes of Cameroon
