= Dschang =

- City
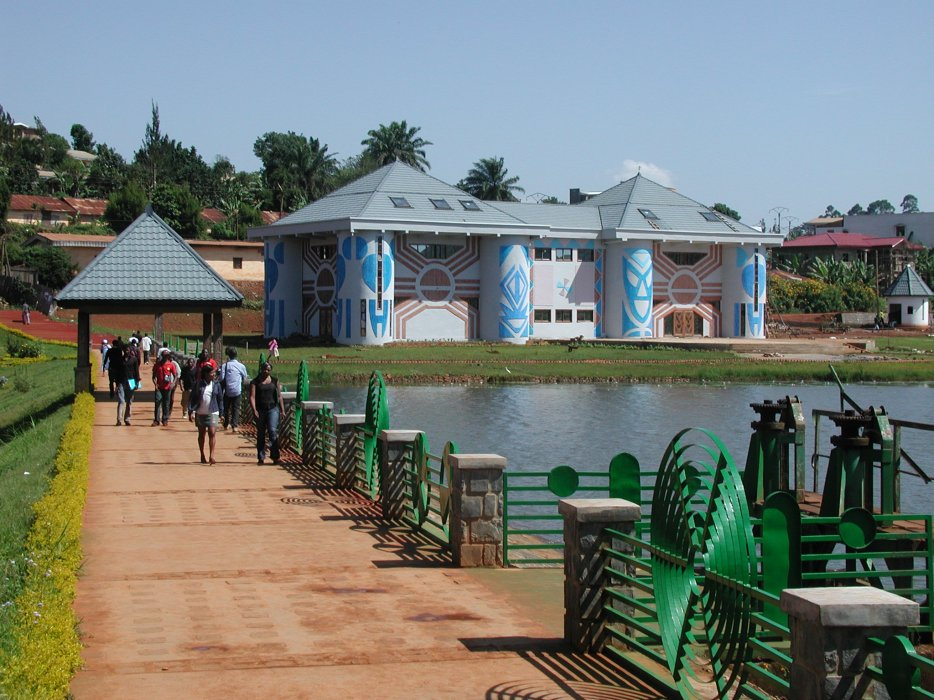

- Location in Cameroon Dschang (Africa)
- Coordinates: 5°27′N 10°04′E
- Country: Cameroon
- Region: West
- Department: Menoua

Government
  - Mayor: Hervé Tatsinkou
  - Deputy Mayor: Jules Pouokam
  - City Manager: Pierre Ngouakam
  - Deputy City Manager: Étienne Nguimkeng

Area
  - Total: 225 km^{2} (87 sq mi)
- Elevation: 1,380 m (4,530 ft)

Population (2012)
  - Total: 76,524
  - Density: 340/km^{2} (881/sq mi)

Dschang is a city located in the West (Ouest) Province of Cameroon, with an estimated population of 87,000 (est) in 2001, growing dramatically from 21,705 recorded in 1981. The 2006 Population is estimated to be 200,000 inhabitants. Dschang is the capital of the division of Ménoua. The Bamiléké are the predominant ethnic tribe.

== History ==
=== Colonial era ===
The documented history of Dschang began in 1895, when it was invaded by a German military mission. In 1909, the city replaced Fontem as the capital of a Germany military district. The region where Dschang now exists was then not the place of any major settlement but, instead, was an area that two bordering chiefdoms fought over. The name Dschang translates to "dispute" in the local language.

Following Germany's defeat during World War I, Cameroon became both a British and French possession, France declared Dschang to be the capital of West Province, and developed the city's vacation resort in the 1940s. This resort now forms the basis of Dschang's plans to promote the city as a tourist destination.

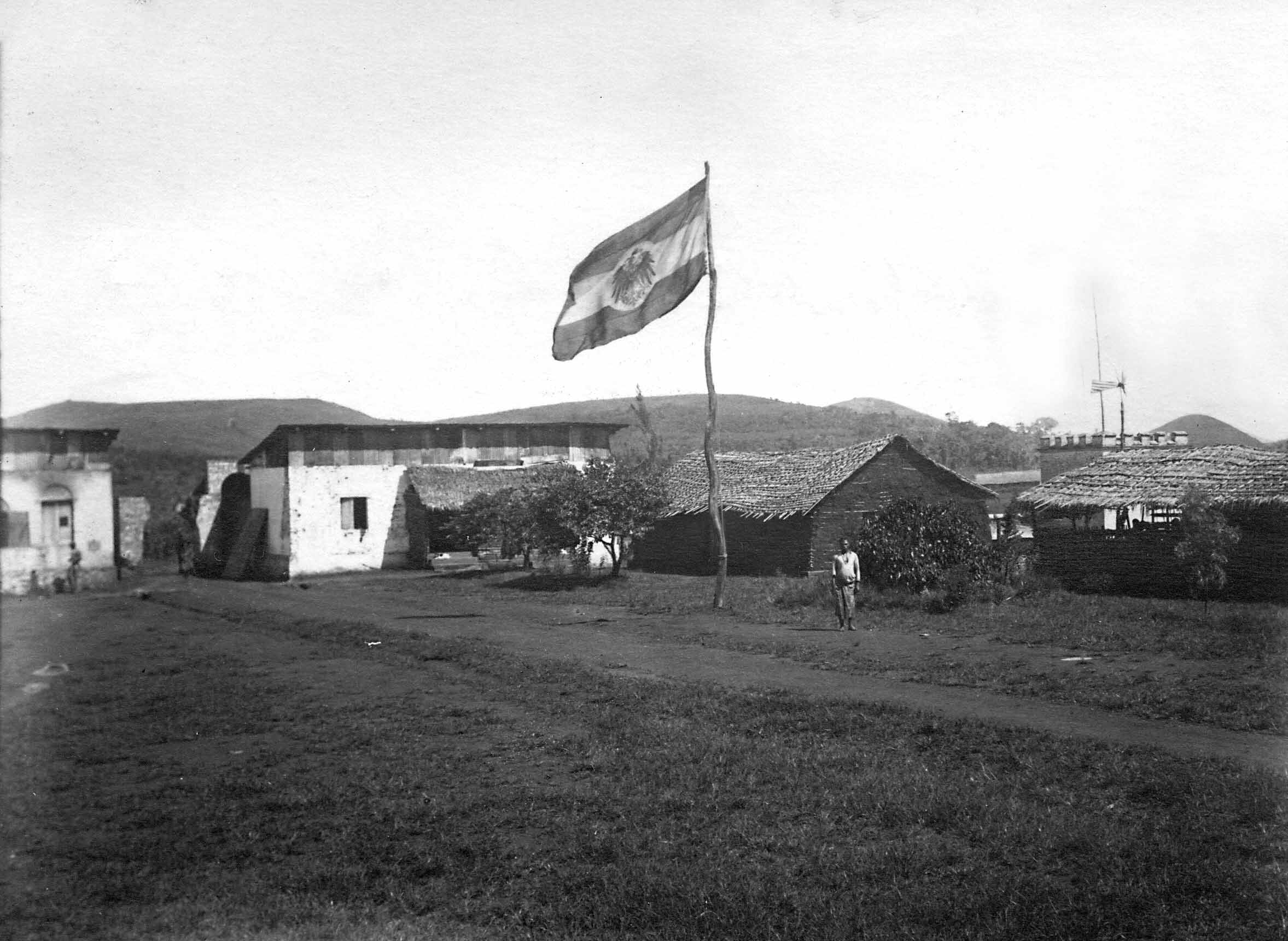
Dschang military station, c. 1915

=== Post-colonial era ===
On January 1, 1960, Cameroon became an independent state, and the regional administration was moved to the city of Bafoussam. Dschang suffered from this move, as much more effort was invested in the infrastructure of Bafoussam.

Following the opening of the Université de Dschang (University of Dschang) in 1993, however, foreign interest and developmental investment of the city began to increase, and plans for a drive to increase tourism and the exploitation of mineral deposits will contribute to the city's current development.

== Economy and infrastructure ==
Due to its elevation of 1380 m, Dschang is favoured by relatively cool temperatures and attractive scenery. It is therefore regarded as a mountain tourist resort. Since colonial times, Dschang has been an important agricultural center. Pig production plays a major role.

Deposits of the aluminum-bearing ore bauxite have been discovered nearby; however, a lack of infrastructure has prevented full-scale mining operations to date.

=== Transport ===
The town is reached by year-round trafficable dust roads or asphalt roads. There are bus connections to Bafoussam and Yaoundé. There is also an airstrip.

== Higher education ==
Since 1993, Dschang has a university with faculties for Agricultural Sciences; Economic Sciences and Business Management; Humanities; Law and Political Sciences; and Sciences. The Faculty for Agricultural Sciences, has been the first faculty and the university continues to be very strong in this thematic area.

== Culture ==
The population of Dschang mainly speaks Yemba language, a Bamileke language.

In early 2011, the Musée des Civilisations du Cameroun à Dschang was inaugurated. This museum offers to discover the origin of the Cameroonian people and the diversity of the country's four large cultural domains via their history, but also their artistic productions, their architectures, and their political and social organizations.

== Notable people ==
- Philomène Bassek, writer
- Jerome Feudjio, Catholic priest, attended school in Dschang
- Pascal Kenfack, painter and sculptor
- Lionel Manga, writer and critic
- Claude-Joseph M’Bafou-Zetebeg, politician, diplomat, and writer
- Robins Tchale-Watchou, rugby union player
- Brigitte Tsobgny, writer
- Leopold Zekeng, immunologist and microbiologist

== Gallery ==
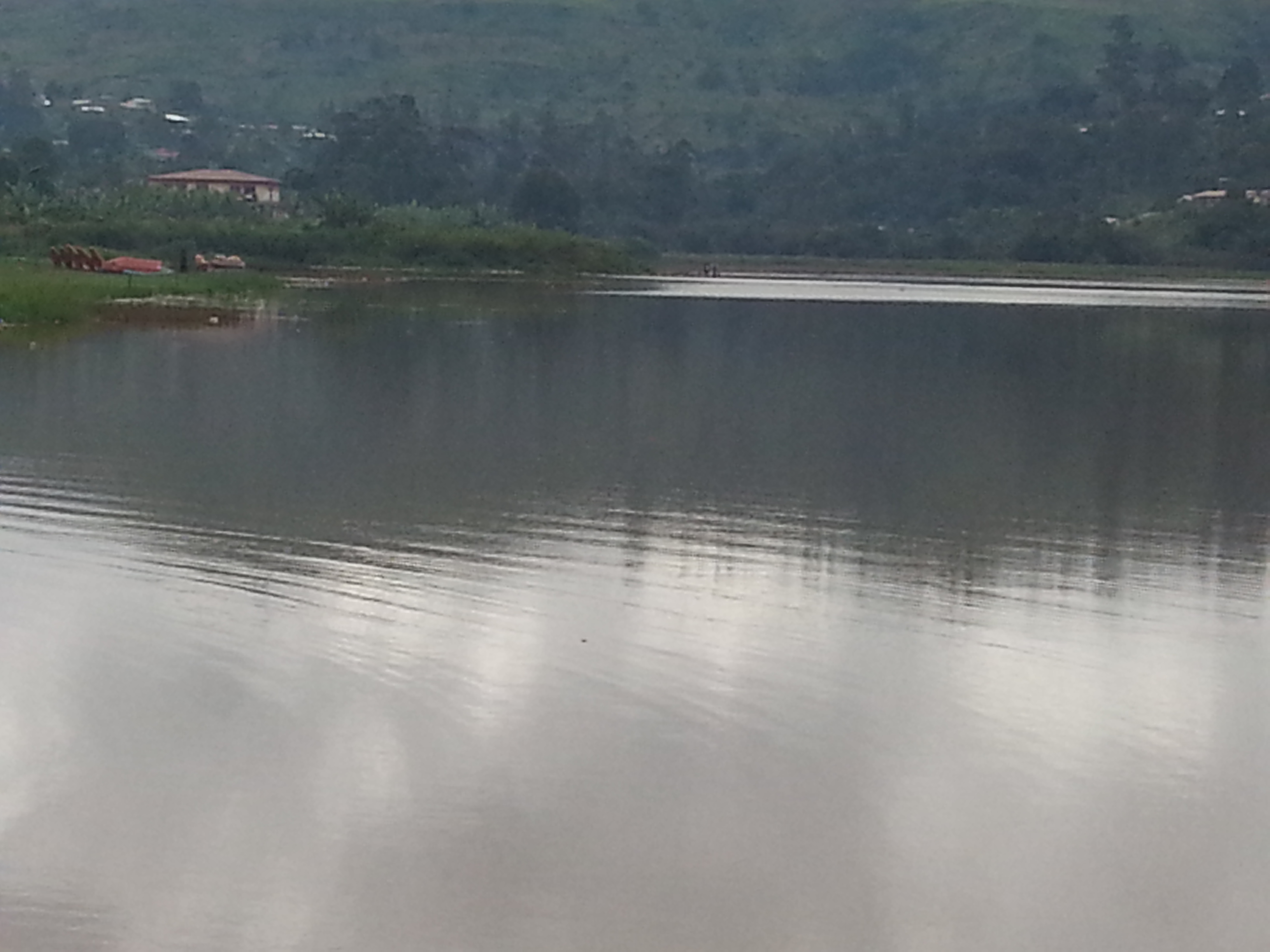
Dschang Municipal Lake

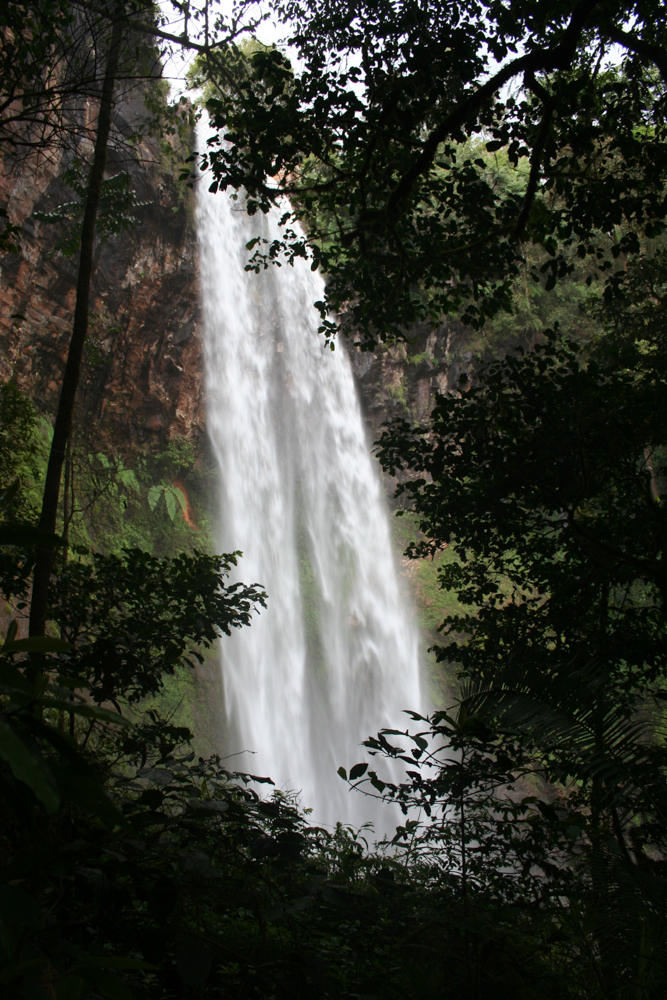
Mamy Wata waterfalls

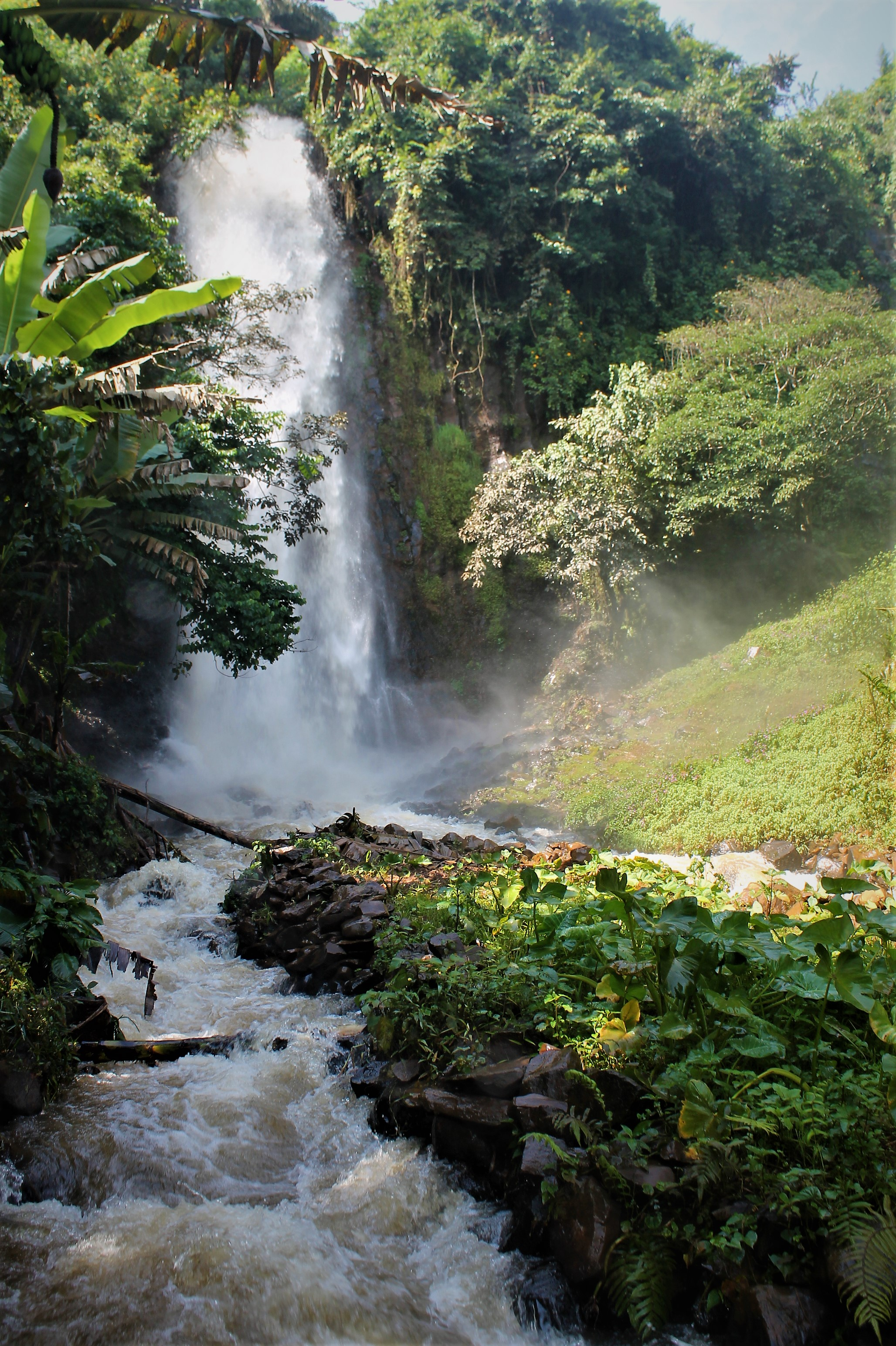
Nsem-Tsa waterfall in Dschange

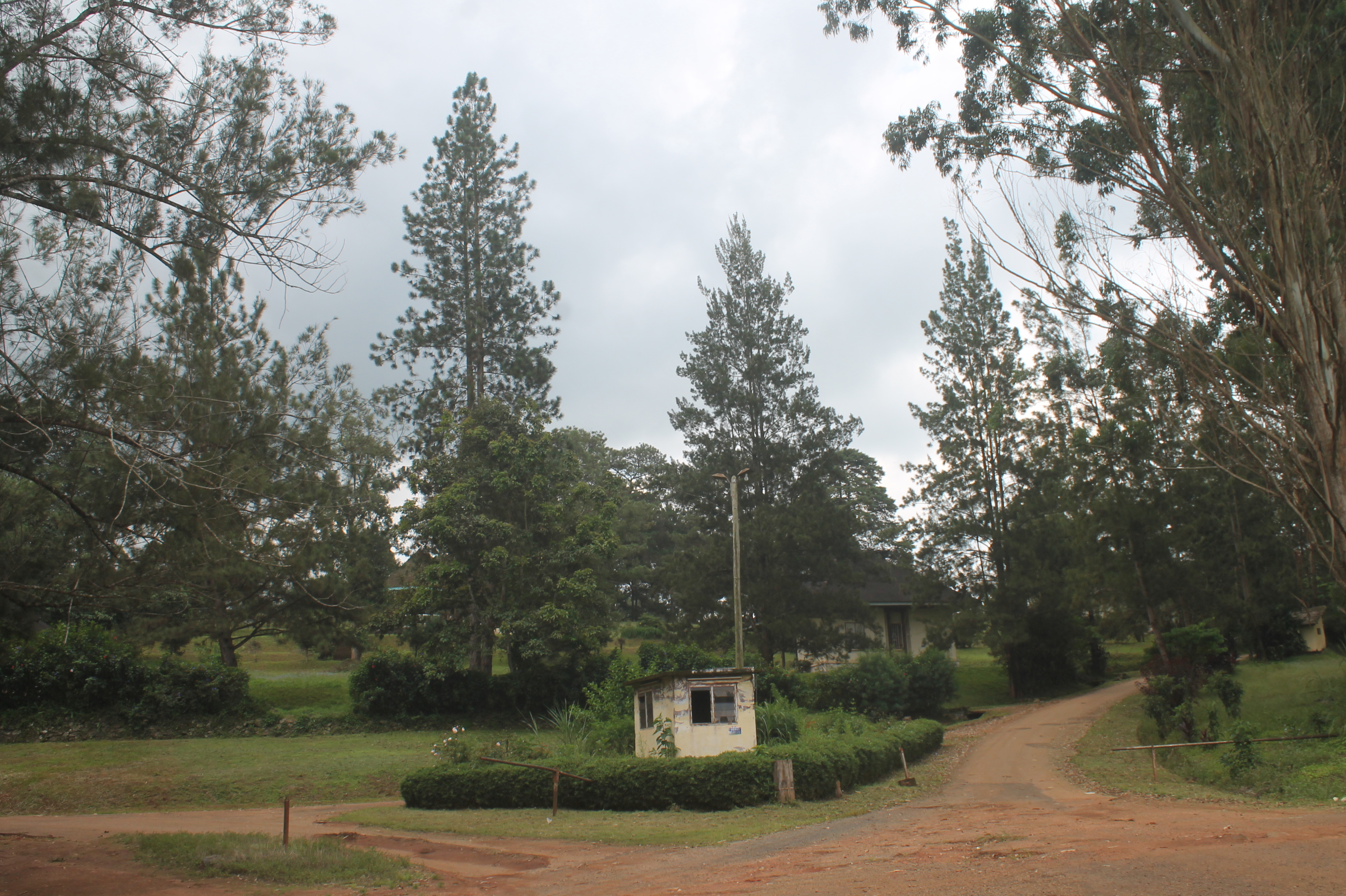
Front view of the entrance to the Climate Center

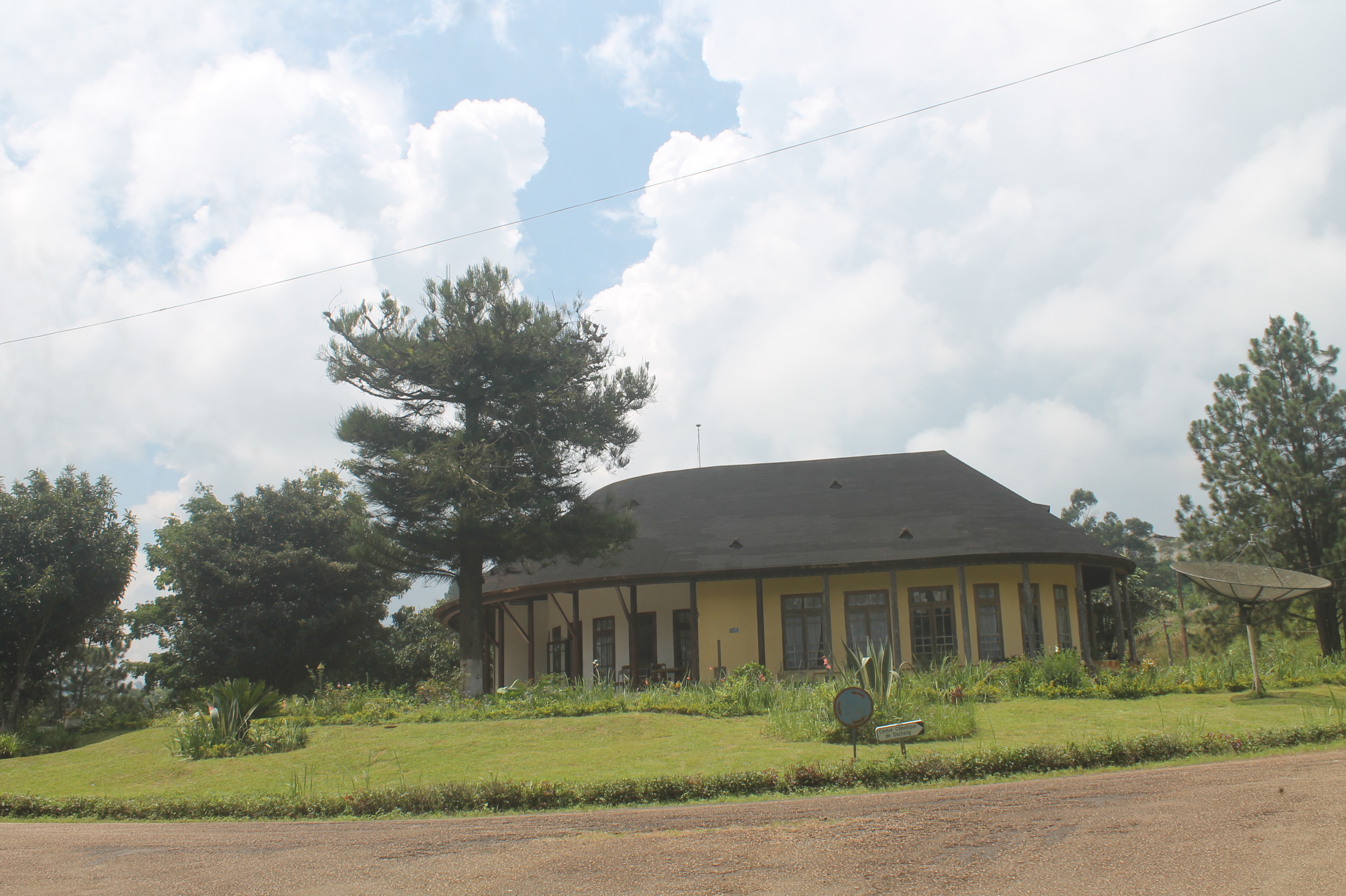
Climate Centre in Dschang

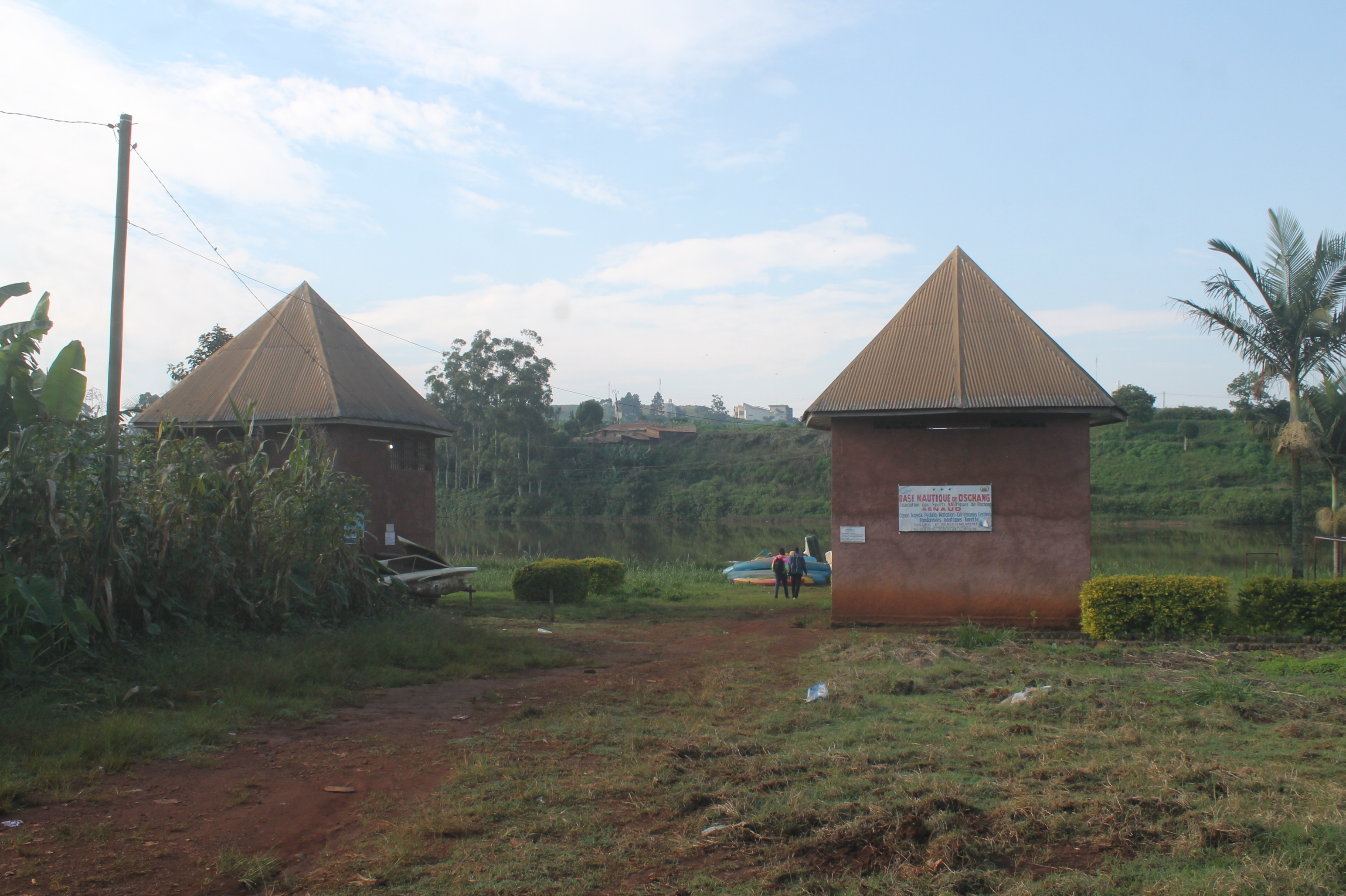
Front view of the Nautical Base in Dschang

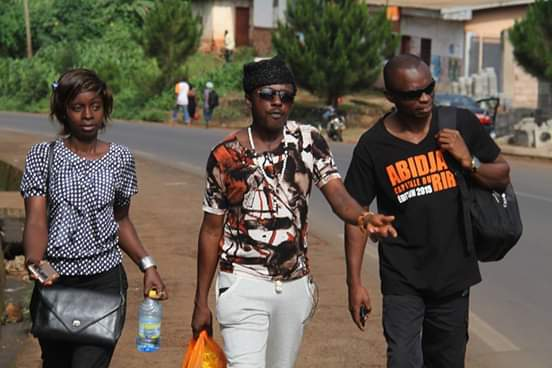
Inhabitants of Dschang

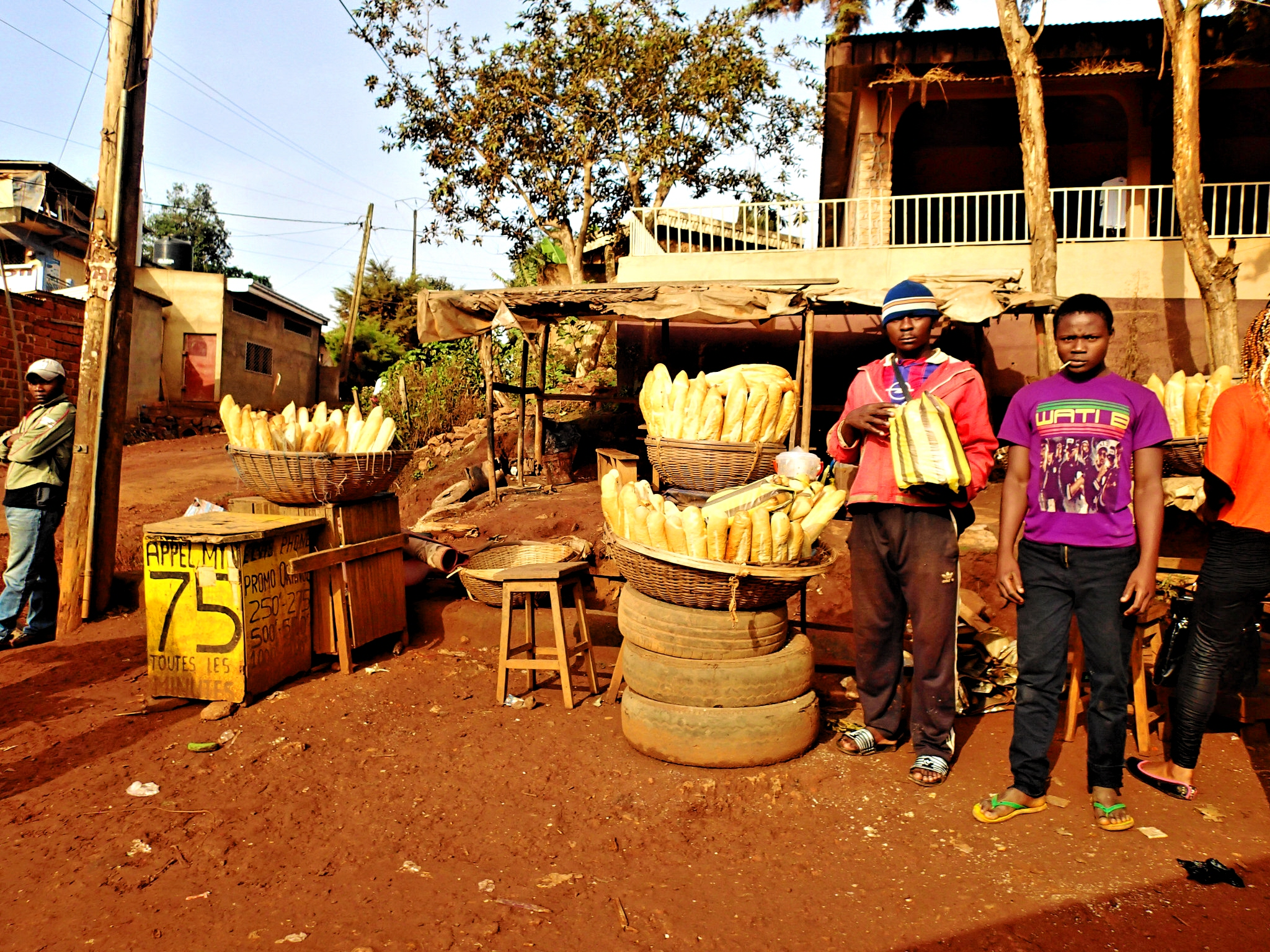
Bread selling on a street in Dschang

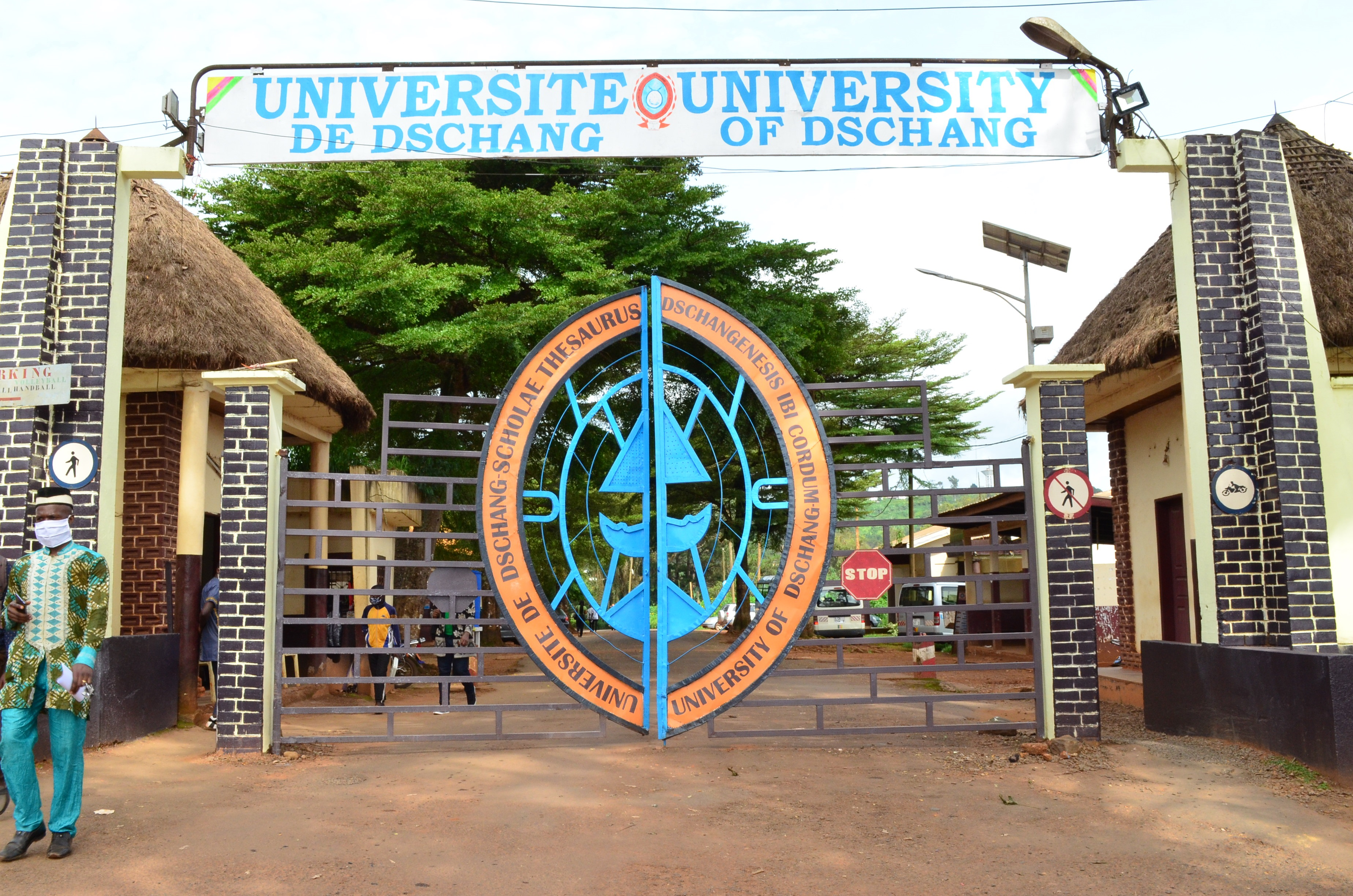
Entrance to the University of Dschang

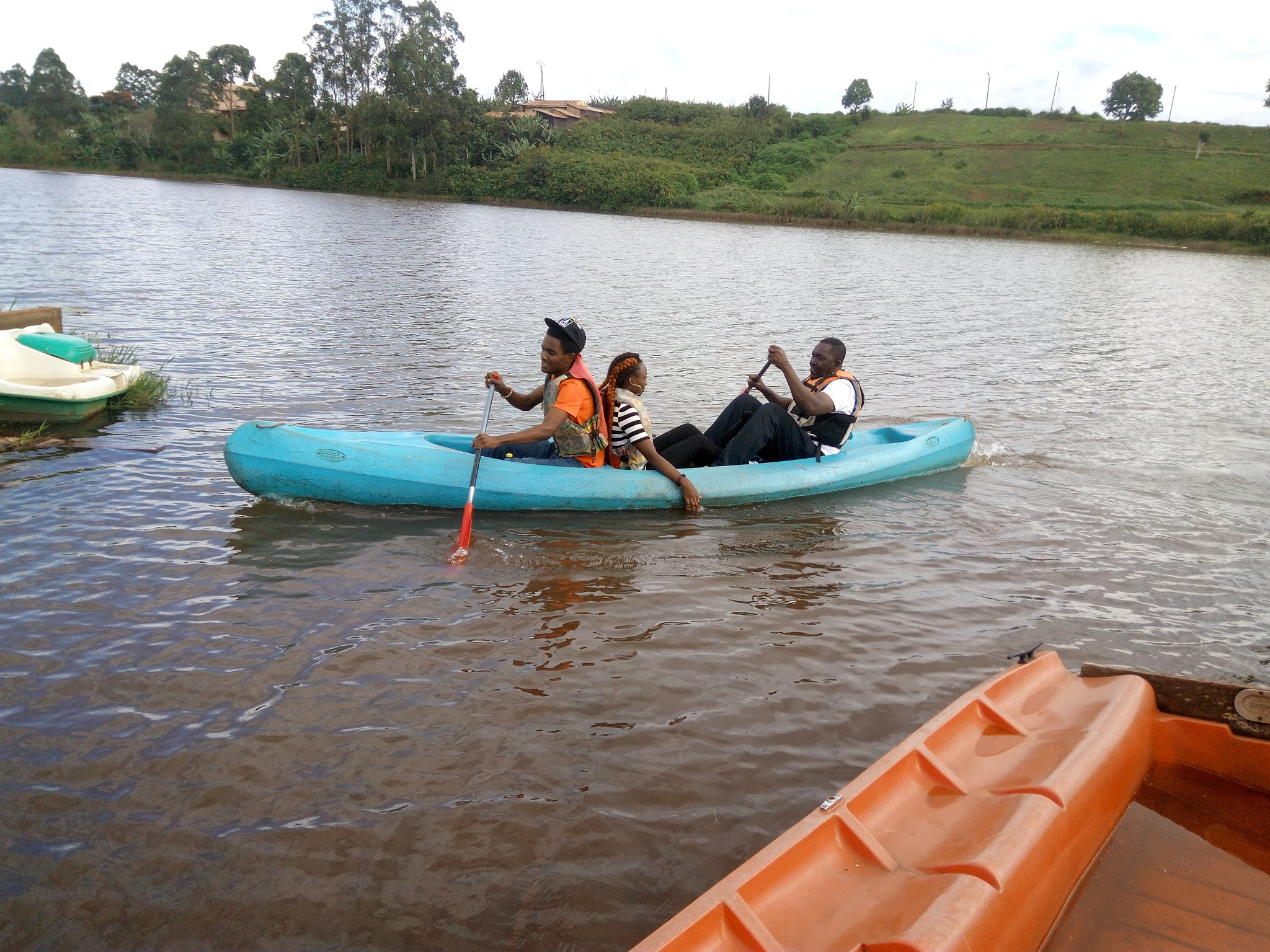
Canoe on the Dschang Municipal Lake

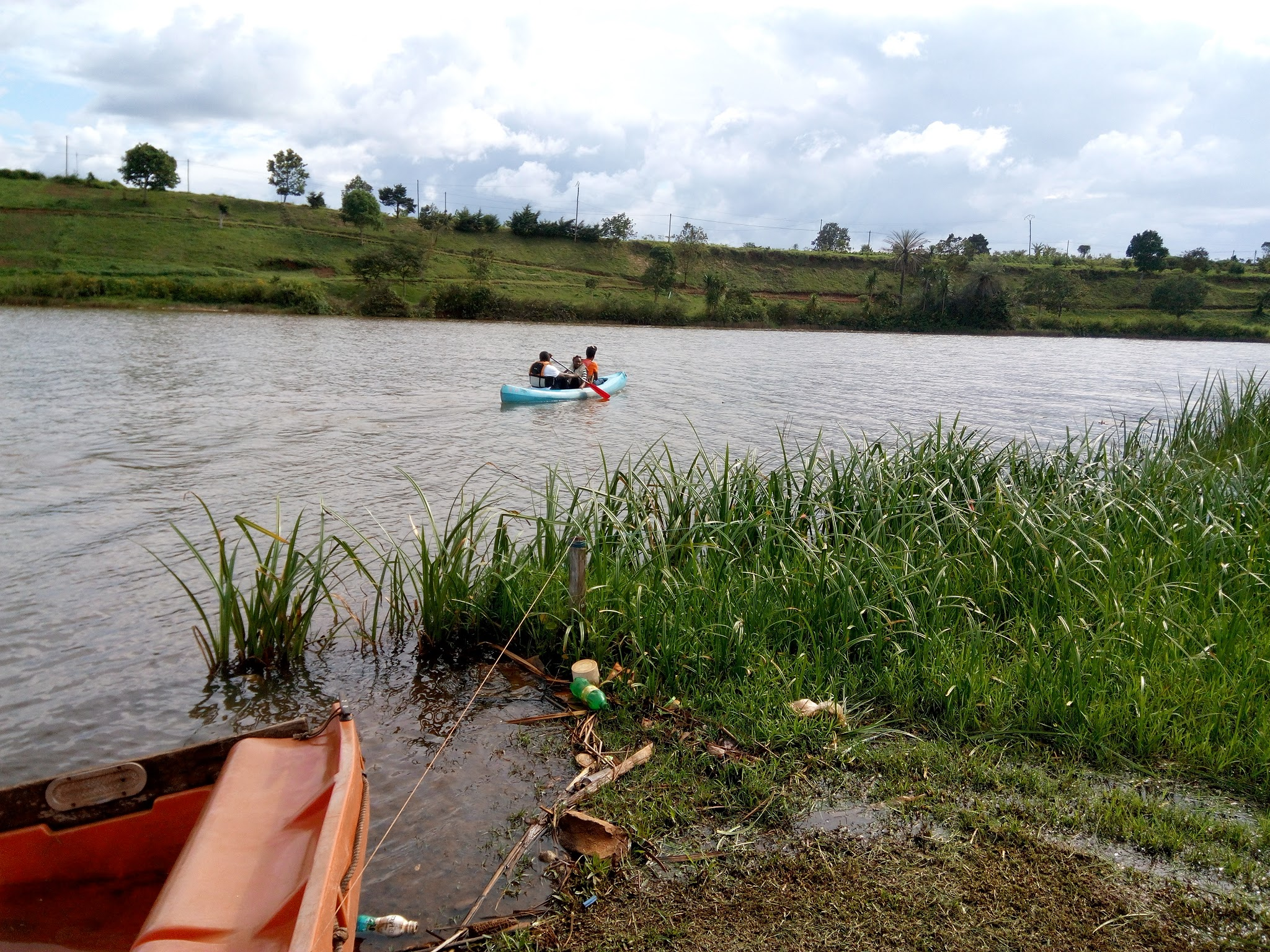
