= List of hospitals in Cameroon =

Provinces of Cameroon

The following is a list of hospitals in Cameroon by region showing the type and location of the hospitals.

Large hospitals in Cameroon, such as the 650 bed-Central Hospital of Yaoundé founded in 1933, date from the French and British rule period. The General Hospital in Yaoundé was originally established for blacks only.

Beginning in 2016, Cameroon's health infrastructure was organized into the 10 Regions containing 189 health districts, 1800 health areas managed by the Cameroonian Ministry of Public Health. There are district hospitals in most districts and regional hospitals in all Regions except the East Region. There were approximately 5166 public and private health facilities spread throughout the national territory. Access to health services in Cameroon in 2016 was at 2.19 health facilities per 10,000 inhabitants. Besides public hospitals, there are also non-profit hospitals managed for the most part by religious organizations. There are several hospitals in Cameroon built by or supported by the Chinese Ministry of Health. The health facilities are organized into seven main categories: general hospitals, central hospitals, regional hospitals, district hospitals, district medical centers, Integrated health centers and ambulatory health centers.

== Adamawa ==
The Ministry of Public Health has established nine health districts in the Adamawa Region. There are five district hospitals, one private hospital, and one regional hospital in the Adamawa Region.

Hospitals in the Adamawa Region
Name	Type	City/Commune, Coords., Refs.
Bankim Hôpital de District	District, Ministry of Public Health	Bankim, 6.0784°N 11.4917°E
Banyo Hôpital de District	District, Ministry of Public Health	Banyo, 6.7454°N 11.7878°E
Baptist Hospital Banyo	Non-profit, Cameroon Baptist Convention Healthcare	Banyo, 6.751869113693811°N 11.830960369380644°E
Boumdjere Regional Hôpital	Regional, Ministry of Public Health	Boumdjere
Belel Centre Médical d'Arrondissement	Centre, Ministry of Public Health	Belel, 7.0458°N 14.4356°E
Dang Centre Médical d'Arrondissement	Centre, Ministry of Public Health	Dang, 7.4201°N 13.5538°E
Dibi Centre Médical d'Arrondissement	Centre, Ministry of Public Health	Dibi, 7.1421°N 13.7168°E
Dir Centre Médical d'Arrondissement	Centre, Ministry of Public Health	Dir, 6.3193°N 13.5443°E
Djohong Hôpital de District	District, Ministry of Public Health	Djohong, 6.8313°N 14.6945°E
Galim-Tignère Centre Médical d'Arrondissement	Centre, Ministry of Public Health	Galim-Tignère, 7.0982°N 12.4647°E
Kontcha Centre Médical d'Arrondissement	Centre, Ministry of Public Health	Kontcha, 7.9731°N 12.2272°E
Mayo-Baléo Centre Médical d'Arrondissement	Centre, Ministry of Public Health	Mayo-Baléo, 7.6521°N 12.3308°E
Mayo-Darlé Centre Médical d'Arrondissement	Centre, Ministry of Public Health	Mayo-Darlé, 6.5002°N 11.5491°E
Mbe Centre Médical d'Arrondissement	Centre, Ministry of Public Health	Mbe, 7.8547°N 13.5981°E
Meiganga Hôpital de District	District, Ministry of Public Health	Meiganga, 6.5106°N 14.2970°E
Ngaoundal Centre Medical d’Arrondissement	Centre, Ministry of Public Health	Ngaoundal, 6.5000°N 13.2667°E
Ngaoundere Hôpital Regional	Regional, Ministry of Public Health	Ngaoundéré, 7.3067°N 13.5823°E
Nyambaka Centre Médical d'Arrondissement	Centre, Ministry of Public Health	Nyambaka, 6.8983°N 14.0854°E
Protestant Hospital of Ngaoundéré	Non-profit, Global Health Ministries	Ngaoundéré, 7.309382°N 13.596818°E
Songkolong Centre Médical d'Arrondissement	Centre, Ministry of Public Health	Songkolong, 6.3953°N 11.3233°E
Tibati Centre Médical d'Arrondissement	Centre, Ministry of Public Health	Tibati, 6.4631°N 12.6224°E
Tignère Hôpital de District	District, Ministry of Public Health	Tignère, 7.3538°N 12.6497°E

== Centre ==
The Ministry of Public Health has established 30 health districts in the Centre Region. There are 27 district hospitals, one Central Hospital and University (CHU), and one regional hospital in the Centre Region. The Central Hospital of Yaoundé, founded in 1933, is the largest hospital in Cameroon with 650 beds.

Hospitals in the Centre Region
Name	Type	City/Commune, Coords., Refs.
Akonolinga Hôpital de District	District, Ministry of Public Health	Akonolinga, 3.7778°N 12.2559°E
Awaé Hôpital de District	District, Ministry of Public Health	Awaé, 3.9039°N 11.8810°E
Ayos Annex Hôpital Regional	Regional, Ministry of Public Health	Ayos, 3.8976°N 12.5299°E
Bafia Hôpital de District	District, Ministry of Public Health	Bafia, 4.7406°N 11.2354°E
Biyem-Assi Hôpital de District	District, Ministry of Public Health	Yaoundé, 3.8263°N 11.4874°E
Cabinet Medicale de La Cathedrale	Private, Catholic Church	Yaoundé, 3.8840773062312364°N 11.534819824522462°E
Central Hospital of Yaoundé	Central, Ministry of Public Health	Yaoundé, 3.8714°N 11.5104°E
Centre Hospitalier et Universitaire de Yaoundé	CHU, University of Yaoundé	Yaoundé, 3.862676°N 11.496645°E
Cite Verte Hôpital de District	District, Ministry of Public Health	Yaoundé, 3.8707°N 11.4926°E
D'joungolo Hôpital de District	District, Ministry of Public Health	Yaoundé, 3.8851°N 11.5331°E
Ebebda Hôpital de District	District, Ministry of Public Health	Ebebda, 4.3499°N 11.3002°E
Efoulan Hôpital de District	District, Ministry of Public Health	Efoulan, 3.8295°N 11.5110°E
Elig-Mfomo Hôpital de District	District, Ministry of Public Health	Elig-Mfomo, 4.2770°N 11.1201°E
Eséka Hôpital de District	District, Ministry of Public Health	Eséka, 3.6395°N 10.7753°E
Esse Hôpital de District	District, Ministry of Public Health	Esse, 4.0924°N 11.8852°E
Essos Centre Hospital	Centre, Ministry of Public Health	Yaoundé, 3.8740°N 11.5409°E
Evodoula Hôpital de District	District, Ministry of Public Health	Evodoula, 4.0923°N 11.2001°E
Hôpital Général de Yaoundé	General	Yaoundé, 3.9066°N 11.5414°E
Institute Pasteur (Ritha Moussongi)	Private, Pasteur Institute	Yaoundé, 3.8736939904663146°N 11.511108826781074°E
Mbalmayo District Hospital	District, Ministry of Public Health	Mbalmayo, 3.5145°N 11.5089°E
Mbandjock Hôpital de District	District, Ministry of Public Health	Mbandjock, 4.4428°N 11.9079°E
Mbankomo Hôpital de District	District, Ministry of Public Health	Mbankomo, 3.7800°N 11.4000°E
Mfou Hôpital de District	District, Ministry of Public Health	Mfou, 3.7172°N 11.6462°E
Monatélé Hôpital de District	District, Ministry of Public Health	Monatélé, 4.2502°N 11.2028°E
Nanga Eboko Hôpital de District	District, Ministry of Public Health	Nanga Eboko, 4.6578°N 12.3708°E
Ndikiniméki Hôpital de District	District, Ministry of Public Health	Ndikiniméki, 4.7508°N 10.8276°E
Ngog-Mapubi Hôpital de District	District, Ministry of Public Health	Ngog-Mapubi, 3.9425°N 10.8404°E
Ngoumou Hôpital de District	District, Ministry of Public Health	Ngoumou, 3.5917°N 11.3072°E
Nkolndongo District Hospital	District, Ministry of Public Health	Yaoundé, 3.8554°N 11.5346°E
Ntui Hôpital de District	District, Ministry of Public Health	Ntui, 4.4363°N 11.6323°E
Obala Hôpital de District	District, Ministry of Public Health	Obala, 4.1562°N 11.5378°E
Olembe Hôpital de District	District, Ministry of Public Health	Olembe, Yaoundé 3.8425°N 11.5573°E
Sa'a Hôpital de District	District, Ministry of Public Health	Sa'a, 4.3564°N 11.4480°E
Soa Hôpital de District	District, Ministry of Public Health	Soa, 3.9167°N 11.5846°E
Yaoundé Gynaecology, Obstetrics and Pediatrics Hospital	Specialist, Chinese Ministry of Health	Yaoundé3.875195°N 11.529926°E
Yoko Hôpital de District	District, Ministry of Public Health	Yoko, 5.5391°N 12.3203°E

== East ==
The Ministry of Public Health has established 14 health districts in the East Region. There are 14 district hospitals in the East Region.

Hospitals in the East Region
Name	Type	City/Commune, Coords., Refs
Abong-Mbang Hôpital de District	District, Ministry of Public Health	Abong-Mbang, 3.9783°N 13.1820°E
Batouri Hôpital de District	District, Ministry of Public Health	Batouri, 4.4413°N 14.3744°E
Bertoua Hôpital de District	District, Ministry of Public Health	Bertoua, 4.5545°N 13.6834°E
Bétaré-Oya Hôpital de District	District, Ministry of Public Health	Bétaré-Oya, 5.5883°N 14.0875°E
Doume Hôpital de District	District, Ministry of Public Health	Doumé, 4.2386°N 13.4408°E
Garoua Boulai Hôpital de District	District, Ministry of Public Health	Garoua, 5.8653°N 14.5566°E
Kette Hôpital de District	District, Ministry of Public Health	Kette, 4.8833°N 14.5457°E
Lomie Hôpital de District	District, Ministry of Public Health	Lomié, 3.1593°N 13.6196°E
Mbang Hôpital de District	District, Ministry of Public Health	Mbang, 3.9619°N 14.2678°E
Messamena Hôpital de District	District, Ministry of Public Health	Messamena, 3.7325°N 12.8241°E
Moloundou Hôpital de District	District, Ministry of Public Health	Moloundou, 2.0482°N 15.2152°E
Ndelele Hôpital de District	District, Ministry of Public Health	Ndelele, 4.0368°N 14.9297°E
Nguelemendouka Hôpital de District	District, Ministry of Public Health	Nguelemendouka, 4.3960°N 12.9253°E
Yokadouma Hôpital de District	District, Ministry of Public Health	Yokadouma, 3.5178°N 15.0480°E

== Littoral ==
The Ministry of Public Health has established 24 health districts in the Littoral Region. There are 18 district hospitals in the Littoral Region.

Hospitals in the Littoral Region
Name	Type	City/Commune, Coords., Refs.
Bonamoussadi Ad Lucem Hôpital de District	District, Ministry of Public Health	Douala, 4.0836°N 9.7253°E,
Bonassama Hôpital de District	District, Ministry of Public Health	Bonabéri, 4.0731380910526065°N 9.685597934818913°E
Chinese Hospital	General hospital, Chinese Ministry of Health	Douala, 4.056546842086936°N 9.767043209179782°E
Cite Des Palmiers Hôpital de District	District, Ministry of Public Health	Douala, 4.0420°N 9.7617°E
Deido Hôpital de District	District, Ministry of Public Health	Douala, 4.0289°N 9.6826°E
Dibombari Hôpital de District	District, Ministry of Public Health	Dibombari, 4.1787°N 9.6561°E
Douala Hôpital General	General, Ministry of Public Health	Douala, 4.0548°N 9.7582°E
Edéa Hôpital Regional	Regional, Ministry of Public Health	Edéa, 3.7905°N 10.1165°E
Ekol-Mbeng Hôpital Regional	Regional, Ministry of Public Health	Nkongsamba. 4.9604°N 9.9307°E
Laquintinie Hospital	Ministry of Public Health	Douala, 4.048625025497793°N 9.703369882461907°E
Logbaba Hôpital de District	District, Ministry of Public Health	Douala, 4.0255°N 9.7542°E
Loum Hôpital de District	District, Ministry of Public Health	Loum, 4.7156°N 9.7302°E
Manjo Hôpital de District	District, Ministry of Public Health	Manjo, 4.8386°N 9.8222°E
Manoka Hôpital de District	District, Ministry of Public Health	Manoka, 4.0281°N 9.6823°E (Note: The WHO lists a second Manoka District Hospital in the Wildlife Reserve.)
Mbanga Hôpital de District	District, Ministry of Public Health	Mbanga, 4.4877°N 9.5643°E
Mboppi Baptist Hospital	Non-profit, Cameroon Baptist Convention Healthcare	Douala, 4.0412866445764015°N 9.71614190917974°E
Melong Hôpital de District	District, Ministry of Public Health	Melong, 5.1121°N 9.9407°E
Ndom Hôpital de District	District, Ministry of Public Health	Ndom, 4.3877°N 10.8170°E
New Bell Hôpital de District	District, Ministry of Public Health	Douala, 4.0187°N 9.7097°E
Ngambé Hôpital de District	District, Ministry of Public Health	Ngambé, 4.2304°N 10.6231°E
Nkondjock Hôpital de District	District, Ministry of Public Health	Sahe, 4.8401°N 10.2271°E
Nylon Hôpital de District	District, Ministry of Public Health	Douala, 4.0194°N 9.7306°E
Polyclinique Bonanjo; Daniel Muna Memorial Clinic	General, Private	Douala, 4.037273341314301°N 9.68941773801561°E
Pouma Hôpital de District	District, Ministry of Public Health	Pouma, 3.8482°N 10.5226°E
Presbyterian Health Complex Douala	Non-profit Eye Clinic, Presbyterian	Douala, 4.074008570037073°N 9.721064777833883°E
Yabassi Hôpital de District	District, Ministry of Public Health	Yabassi, 4.4514°N 9.9708°E

== North ==
The Ministry of Health has divided the North Region into 15 health districts. There are two health districts for Garoua. The regional hospital is in Garoua. In addition to the district hospitals listed below, there is a Golombe health district.

Hospitals in the North Region
Name	Type	City/Commune, Coords., Refs.
Bibemi Hôpital de District	District, Ministry of Public Health	Bibemi9.3087°N 13.8768°E
Figuil Hôpital de District	District, Ministry of Public Health	Figuil9.7502°N 13.9693°E
Garoua Hôpital de District	District, Ministry of Public Health	Garoua9.2995°N 13.3918°E
Garoua Hôpital Regional	Regional, Ministry of Public Health	Garoua, 9.2955°N 13.3884°E
Gaschiga Hôpital de District	District, Ministry of Public Health	Gashiga9.4331°N 13.3634°E
Guider Hôpital de District	District, Ministry of Public Health	Guider9.9291°N 13.9508°E
Lagdo Hôpital de District	District, Ministry of Public Health	Lagdo9.0516°N 13.6602°E
M Hôpital de District	District, Ministry of Public Health	Garoua9.2953°N 13.3921°E
Mayo-Oulo Hôpital de District	District, Ministry of Public Health	Mayo-Oulo9.9686°N 13.6183°E
Ngong Hôpital de District	District, Ministry of Public Health	Ngong9.0251°N 13.5097°E
Pitoa Hôpital de District	District, Ministry of Public Health	Pitoa9.3869°N 13.5055°E
Poli Hôpital de District	District, Ministry of Public Health	Poli, Faro Department8.4748°N 13.2454°E
Rey Bouba Hôpital de District	District, Ministry of Public Health	Rey Bouba8.6591°N 14.1736°E
Tcholliré Hôpital de District	District, Ministry of Public Health	Tcholliré8.4022°N 14.1698°E
Touboro Hôpital de District	District, Ministry of Public Health	Touboro7.7677°N 15.3558°E

== Extreme North ==
The Ministry of Public Health has divided the Extreme North Region into 30 health districts.

Hospitals in the Extreme North Region
Name	Type	City/Commune, Coords., Refs.
Maroua Hôpital Regional	Regional, Ministry of Public Health	Maroua, 10.5868°N 14.3118°E
Yagoua Hôpital Regional	Regional, Ministry of Public Health	Yagoua, 10.3180°N 15.2265°E
Annexe de Kousséri Hôpital Regional	Regional, Ministry of Public Health	Kousséri, 12.0838°N 15.0326°E
Bogo Hôpital de District	District, Ministry of Public Health	Bogo, 10.7209°N 14.5947°E
Bourha Hôpital de District	District, Ministry of Public Health	Bourha, 10.2535°N 13.5155°E
Doukoula Hôpital de District	District, Ministry of Public Health	Doukoula, 10.1138°N 14.9715°E
Goulfey Hôpital de District	District, Ministry of Public Health	Goulfey, 12.3788°N 14.9086°E
Guere Hôpital de District	District, Ministry of Public Health	Guere, 10.0230°N 15.2737°E
Guidiguis Hôpital de District	District, Ministry of Public Health	Guidiguis, 10.1375°N 14.7105°E
Hina Hôpital de District	District, Ministry of Public Health	Hina, 10.3645°N 13.8555°E
Hôpital Cemao de Meskine	Non-profit, Medical Centres of West Africa	Miskine, 10.564373758382711°N 14.251561023272144°E
Kaélé Hôpital de District	District, Ministry of Public Health	Kaélé, 10.1067°N 14.4408°E
Kar Hay Hôpital de District	District, Ministry of Public Health	Kar Hay, 10.1041°N 14.9750°E
Kousséri Hôpital de District	District, Ministry of Public Health	Kousséri, 12.0769°N 15.0306°E
Mada Hôpital de District	District, Ministry of Public Health	Maɗa, 12.6318°N 14.4761°E
Makary Hôpital de District	District, Ministry of Public Health	Makary, 12.5734°N 14.4548°E
Mindif Hôpital de District	District, Ministry of Public Health	Mindif, 10.4011°N 14.4377°E
Mogode Hôpital de District	District, Ministry of Public Health	Mogode, 10.5996°N 13.5724°E
Mokolo Hôpital de District	District, Ministry of Public Health	Mokolo, 10.7438°N 13.8014°E
Mora Hôpital de District	District, Ministry of Public Health	Mora, 11.0425°N 14.1444°E
Moulvoudaye Hôpital de District	District, Ministry of Public Health	Moulvoudaye, 10.3976°N 14.8570°E
Moutourwa Hôpital de District	District, Ministry of Public Health	Moutourwa, 10.1994°N 14.1807°E
Petté Hôpital de District	District, Ministry of Public Health	Petté, 10.9688°N 14.4980°E
Roua Hôpital de District	District, Ministry of Public Health	Roua, 10.7759°N 13.9979°E
Tokombéré Hôpital de District	District, Ministry of Public Health	Tokombéré, 10.8620°N 14.1587°E
Vele Hôpital de District	District, Ministry of Public Health	Vele, 10.4857°N 15.2063°E

== Northwest ==
The Ministry of Public Health has divided the Northwest Region into 19 health districts.

Hospitals in the Northwest Region
Name	Type	city/Commune, Coords., Refs.			
Ako Hôpital de District	District, Ministry of Public Health	Ako			
Bafut Hôpital de District	District, Ministry of Health	Bafut			
Bali Hôpital de District	District, Ministry of Public Health	Bali			
Bamenda Regional Hospital	Regional, Ministry of Health	Bamenda, 5.9511°N 10.1418°E			
Baptist Hospital Banso	Non-profit, Cameroon Baptist Convention Healthcare	Banso	Batibo Hôpital de District	District, Ministry of Public Health	Batibo
Bawock Health District Hospital	District, Ministry of Public Health	Bawock			
Benakuma District Hospital	District, Ministry of Publilc Health	Benakuma			
Dunger Baptist Hospital	Non-profit, Cameroon Baptist Convention Healthcare	Mwa, Donga-Mantung			
Fundong Hôpital de District	District, Ministry of Public Health	Fundong			
Grace Gardens Hospital Ndop	Non-profit, Faith Gardens Medical Foundation	Ndop			
Mbengwi Hôpital de District	District, Ministry of Public Health	Mbengwi			
Mbingo Baptist Hospital	Non-profit, Cameroon Baptist Convention Healthcare	Mbingo			
Ndop Hôpital de District	District, Ministry of Public Health	Ndop			
Ndu District Hospital	District, Ministry of Public Health	Ndu			
Nduh Hôpital de District	District, Ministry of Public Health	Nduh, Cameroon			
Njikwa Hôpital de District	District, Ministry of Public Health	Fuanatui			
Nkambé Hôpital de District	District, Ministry of Public Health	Nkambé			
Nwa Hôpital de District	District, Ministry of Public Health	Nwa, Donga-Mantung			
Oku Hôpital de District	District, Ministry of Public Health	Oku			
PMI Medicalized Health Center Nkwen	Health Center, Ministry of Public Health	Bamenda			
Presbyterian General Hospital Acha-Tugi	Non-profit, Presbyterian	Acha-Tugi, Momo Department			
Presbyterian Health Centre Bafut	Non-profit, Presbyterian	Bafut			
Santa Hôpital de District	District, Ministry of Public Health	Santa			
St. Elizabeth Catholic General Hospital Shisong	Non-profit, Catholic	Kumbo			
St Martin de porress Catholic General hospital	Non-profit, Catholic	Njinikom			
Tubah Hôpital de District	District, Ministry of Public Health	Bambili, Bamenda			
Wum Hôpital de District	District, Ministry of Public Health	Wum			
Yang Health Center	Ministry of public health	Yang			

== South ==
There are 10 Ministry of Public Health districts in the South Region.

Hospitals in the South Region
Name	Type	City/Commune, Coords., Refs.
Ambam Hôpital de District	District, Ministry of Public Health	Ambam
Djoum Hôpital de District	District, Ministry of Public Health	Djoum
Ebolowa Regional Hospital	Regional, Ministry of Public Health	Ebolowa, 2.9199°N 11.1671°E
Enongal Hôpital Central	Central, Ministry of Public Health	Ebolowa
Kribi Hôpital de District	District, Ministry of Public Health	Kribi
Lolodorf Hôpital de District	District, Ministry of Public Health	Lolodorf
Mekomengona District Hôpital de District	District, Ministry of Public Health	Ebengon, Dja-et-Lobo
Meyomessala Hôpital de District	District, Ministry of Public Health	Meyomessala
Mvangan Hôpital de District	District, Ministry of Public Health	Mvangane
Olamze Hôpital de District	District, Ministry of Public Health	Olamze
Sangmélima Hôpital de District	District, Ministry of Public Health	Sangmélima
Zoetele Hôpital de District	District, Ministry of Public Health	Zoetele

== Southwest ==
There are 14 Ministry of Public Health districts in the Southwest Region.

Hospitals in the Southwest Region
Name	Type	City/Commune, Coords., Refs.
Baptist Hospital Mutengene	Non-profit, Cameroon Baptist Convention Health Services	Mutengene
Buea Regional Hospital	Regional, Ministry of Public Health	Buea, 4.1457°N 9.2320°E
Christ Medical Center		
Ejed Medical Foundation Hospital	Non-profit	Kumba
Hope Clinic	Non-profit	Kosala Kumba
Kumba District Hospital	District, Ministry of Public Health	Kumba
Limbe Regional Hospital	Regional, Ministry of Public Health	Limbe, 4.0219°N 9.2186°E
Mamfe Hôpital de District	District, Ministry of Public Health	Mamfe
Mary Health of Africa	Non-profit	Fontem
Mbonge Hôpital de District	District, Ministry of Public Health	Mbonge
Presbyterian Medical Institutions Manyemen	Non-profit, Presbyterian	Manyemen
Mundemba Hôpital de District	District, Ministry of Public Health	Mundemba
Muyuka Hôpital de District	District, Ministry of Public Health	Muyuka
Presbyterian Health Complex, Kumba	Non-profit, Presbyterian	Kumba
Presbyterian Hospital Nyasoso	Non-profit, Presbyterian	Nyasoso
Redemption Medical Foundation	Non-profit	Yoke, Muyuka
Solidarity Clinic	Non-profit, Solidarity Foundation	Buea
St. John of God Hospital	Non-profit	Nguti, Koupé-Manengouba
St Joseph's Medical Center	Non-profit	Yoke, Muyuka
Subdivisional Hospital		Muea, Buea
Tiko Hôpital de District	District, Ministry of Public Health	Tiko
Tombel Hôpital de District	District, Ministry of Public Health	Tombel

== West ==
There are 20 Ministry of Public Health districts in the West Region.

Hospitals in the West Region
Name	Type	City/Commune, Coords., Refs.
ACHA Foundation Clinic of Bafoussam	Non-profit, ACHA	Bafoussam
Bafoussam Baptist Hospital	Non-profit, Cameroon Baptist Convention Healthcare	Bafoussam
Bafoussam Regional Hospital	Regional, Ministry of Public Health	Bafoussam, 5.4868°N 10.4061°E
Hôpital de District de Bafang	District, Ministry of Public Health	Bafang
Hôpital de District de Bandja	District, Ministry of Public Health	Bandja
Hôpital de District de Bamendjou	District, Ministry of Public Health	Bamendjou
Hôpital de District de Bangangté	District, Ministry of Public Health	Bangangté
Hôpital de District de Bandjoun	District, Ministry of Public Health	Bandjoun
Hôpital de District de Bangourain	District, Ministry of Public Health	Bangourain
Hôpital de District de Batcham	District, Ministry of Public Health	Batcham
Hôpital de District de Dschang	District, Ministry of Public Health	Dschang
Hôpital de District de Foumban	District, Ministry of Public Health	Foumban
Hôpital de District de Foumbot	District, Ministry of Public Health	Foumbot
Hôpital de District de Galim	District, Ministry of Public Health	Galim
Hôpital de District de Kékem	District, Ministry of Public Health	Kékem
Hôpital de District de Kouoptamo	District, Ministry of Public Health	Kouoptamo
Hôpital de District de Malantouen	District, Ministry of Public Health	Malantouen
Hôpital de District de Massangam	District, Ministry of Public Health	Massangam
Hôpital de District de Mbouda	District, Ministry of Public Health	Mbouda
Hôpital de District de Penka Michel	District, Ministry of Public Health	Penka
Hôpital de District de Santchou	District, Ministry of Public Health	Santchou

== Gallery ==
Hospitals in Cameroon
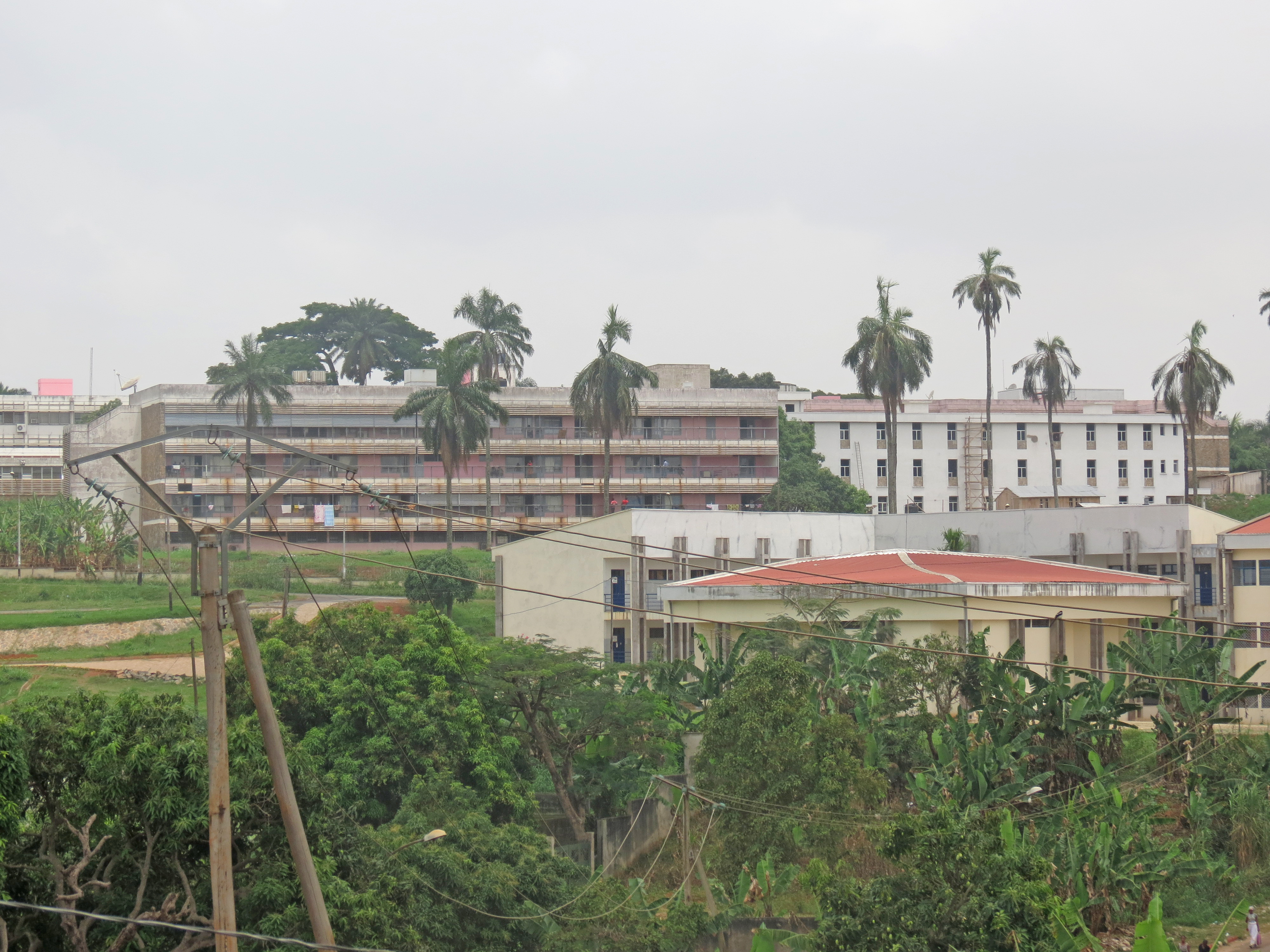
CHU Yaounde, Centre Region

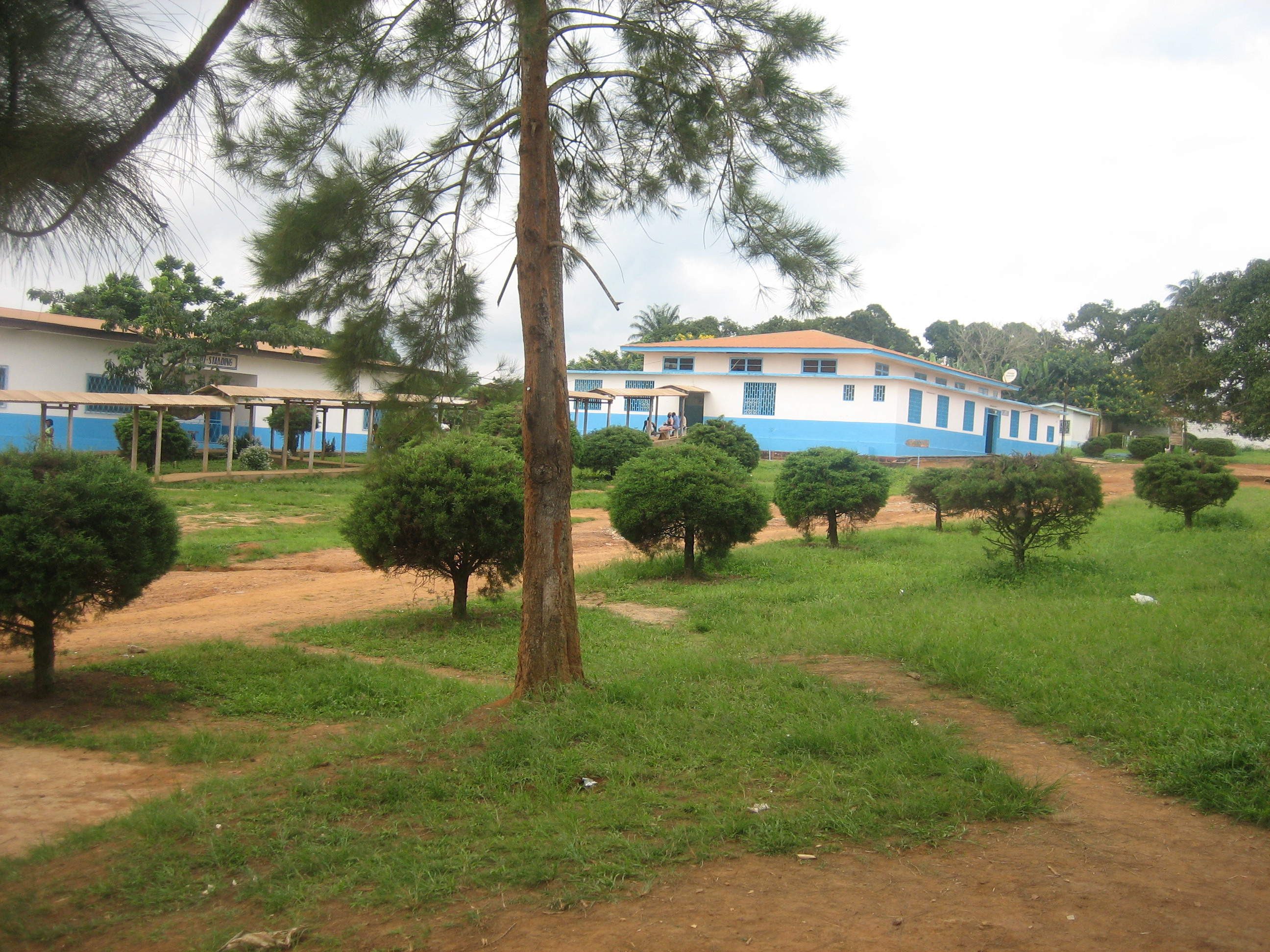
Akonolinga District Hospital, Centre Region

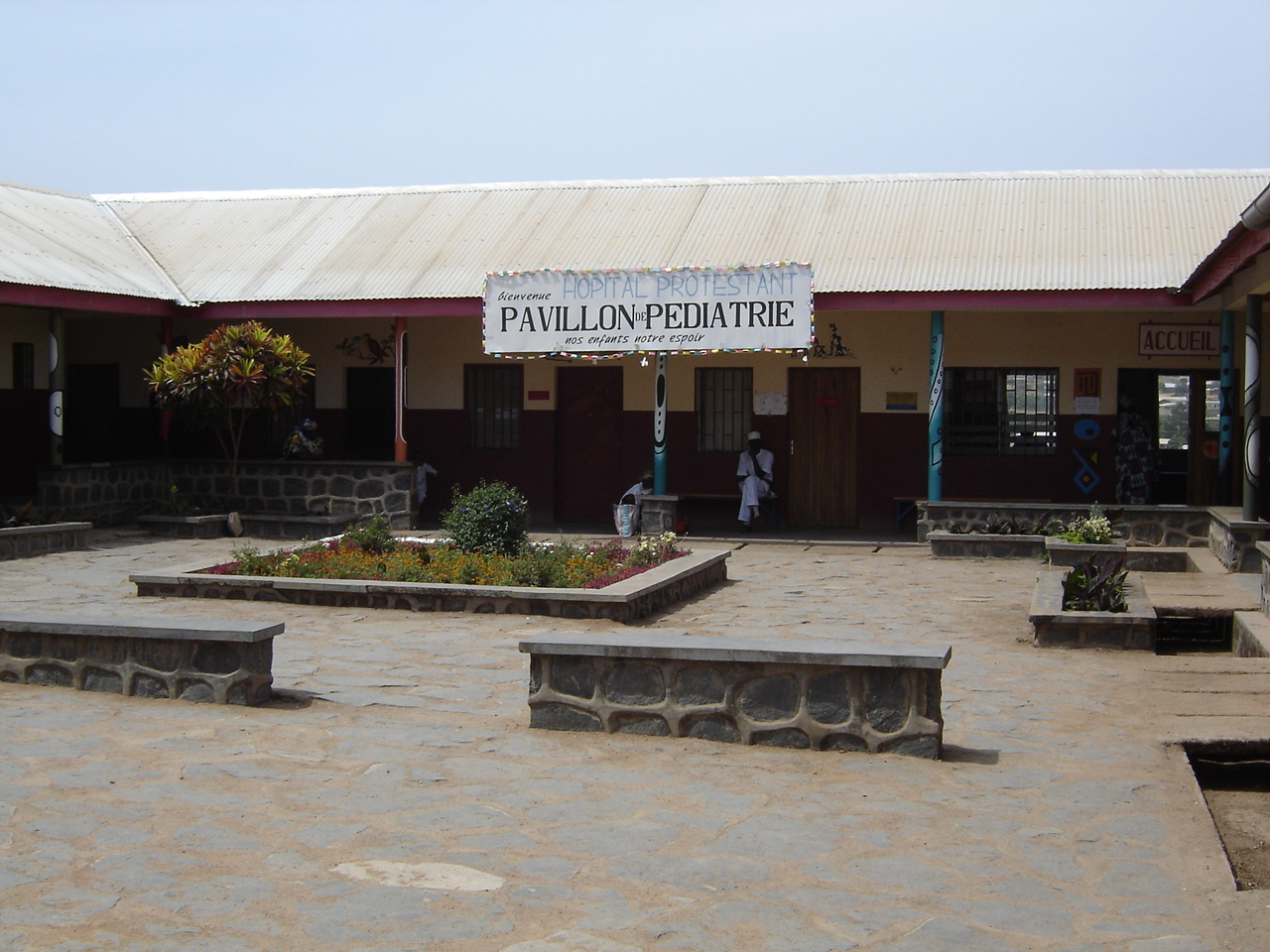
Protestant Hospital of Ngaoundéré, Adamawa Region

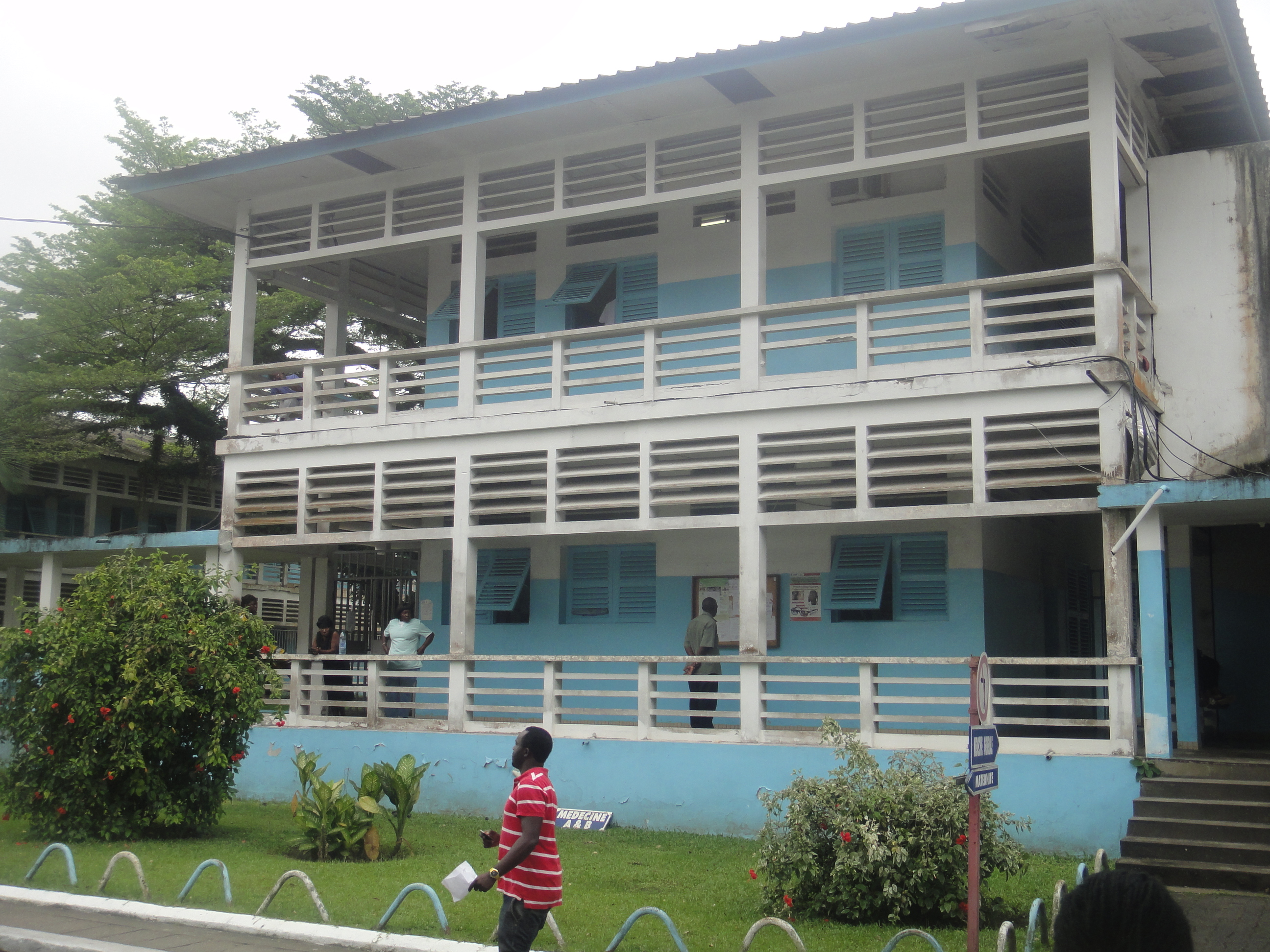
Laquintinie Hospital, Douala, Littoral Region

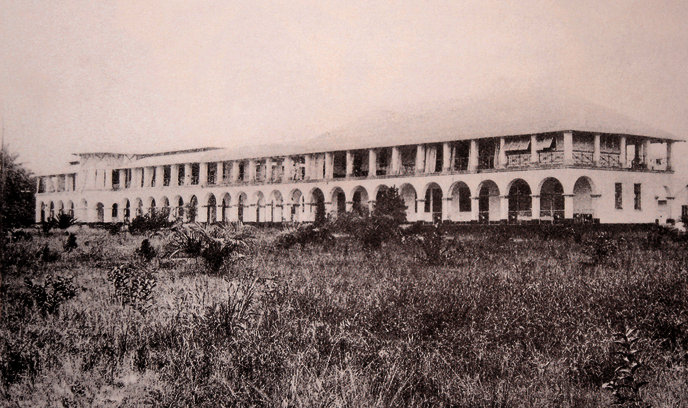
Former Hospital General, Douala, Littoral Region

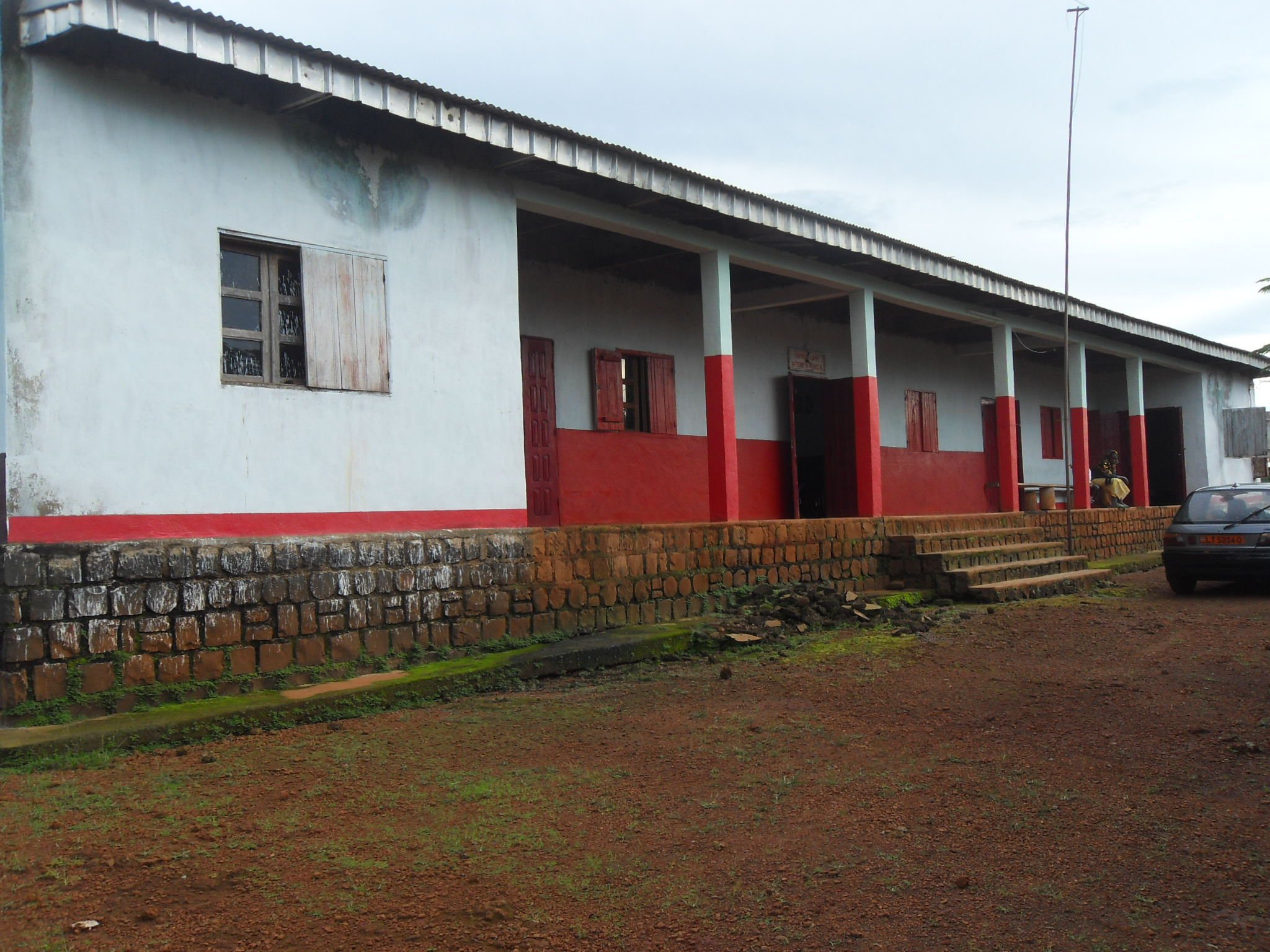
Hospital in Koutaba/Kounja, West Region
