= Central Hospital of Yaoundé =

- Location within Cameroon

Geography
- Location: Yaoundé, Centre Region, Cameroon
- Coordinates: 3.8714°N 11.5104°E

Organisation
- Type: Teaching

Services
- Beds: 650

History
- Founded: 1933

Links
- Website: www.hopitalcentral.org/nouveau/
- Lists: Hospitals in Cameroon

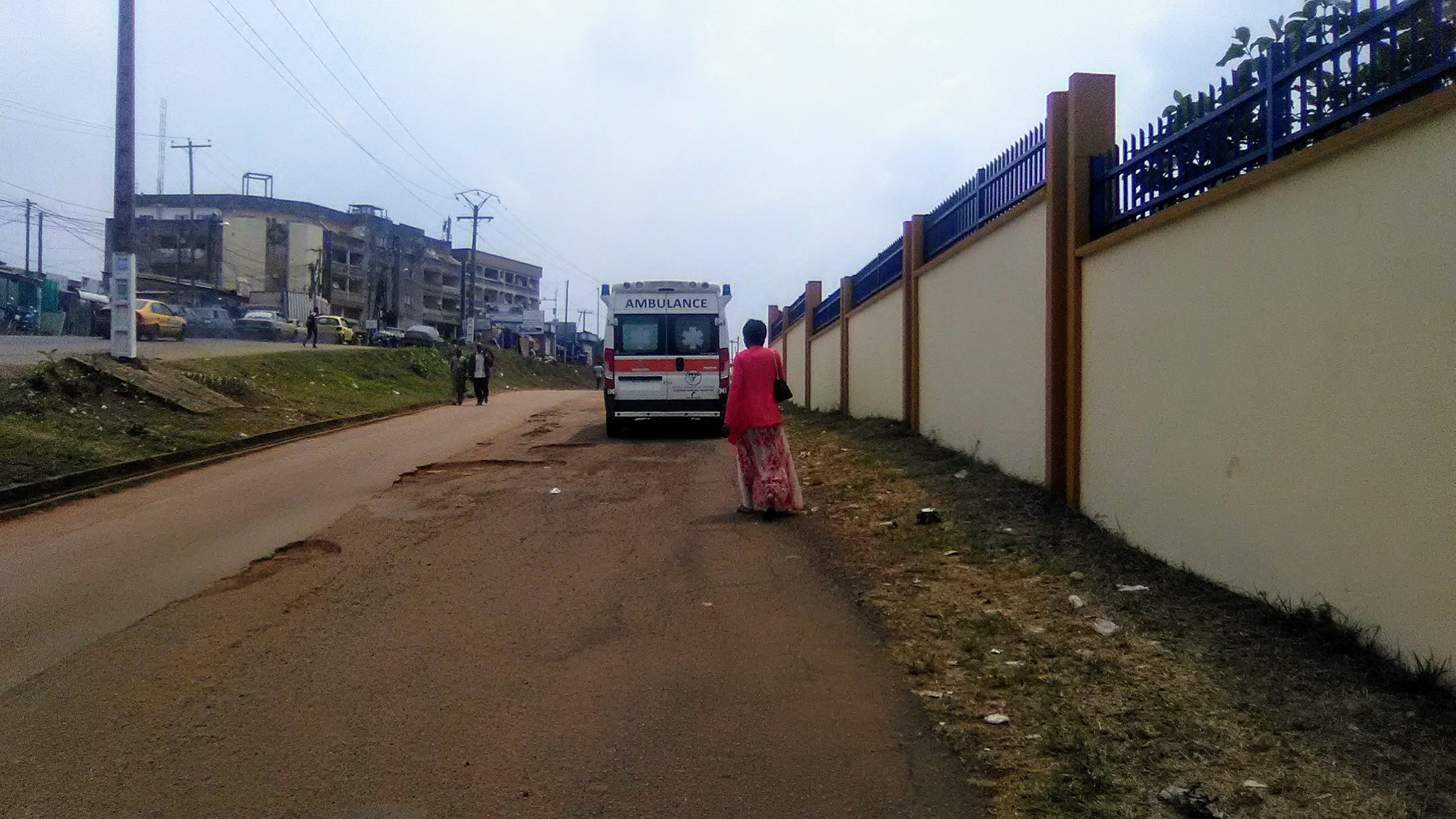
Central Hospital of Yaoundé's ambulance fetching emergency cases throughout the city.

The Central Hospital of Yaoundé (In French, Hôpital Central de Yaoundé - HCY) is a hospital in the city of Yaoundé, Cameroon founded in 1933. It is Cameroon's largest hospital. Simon Pierre Tchoungui (1916-1997), the former prime minister of East Cameroun, was medical superintendent of the hospital in 1960 before being appointed Minister of Health in 1961.

== History ==
The hospital was originally a day facility, but since has gone through several structural changes and now offers 24/7 care. Treatment of HIV/AIDS is one of the main programs, with the day hospital following about 12,000 people who are living with HIV and 3,600 who have ARV treatment. The hospital is one of the two teaching hospitals in Yaoundé, the other being the University Teaching Hospital of Yaounde.

Each year the hospital conducts over 300 surgeries and assists with thousands of births. The hospital has the busiest trauma center in the city. A study of admission records in 2007 showed a total of 6,274 trauma patients admitted to the emergency ward. Of these, 71% were male, with a mean age of 29 years. 60% of the injuries were from traffic accidents and 22.5% were from assault. Based on the catchment area, this is a high rate of injury.
