= HGY =

HGY may refer to:

- Harringay railway station, in London
- Hooghly railway station, in West Bengal, India
- Yaoundé General Hospital (French: Hôpital Général de Yaoundé), in Cameroon
