= Yaoundé Gynaecology, Obstetrics and Pediatrics Hospital =

Geography
- Location: 1564 Rte de Ngousso, Yaoundé, Cameroon
- Coordinates: 3.875195°N 11.529926°E

Organisation
- Type: General - Women and children

History
- Founded: 2002

Links
- Website: hgopy.cm
- Lists: Hospitals in Cameroon

The Yaoundé Gynaecology, Obstetrics and Pediatrics Hospital (French Hôpital gynéco-obstétrique et pédiatrique de Yaoundé - HGOPY) is a hospital in Yaoundé, Cameroon that specializes in caring for women and children. The hospital was built with the assistance of the Government of China. It was officially opened on 28 March 2002 by President Paul Biya in a ceremony attended by the Chinese Vice-Minister of Health. Outpatient care began on 1 April 2002.
