= Limbe Provincial Hospital =

Limbe Regional Hospital
- Ministry of Health

Geography
- Location: Limbe, Southwest Province, Southwest Region, Cameroon
- Coordinates: 4.0219°N 9.2186°E

Organisation
- Type: Referral

Services
- Emergency department: Yes
- Beds: 200

History
- Founded: ca. 1940

Links
- Lists: Hospitals in Cameroon

Limbe Provincial Hospital (now Regional Hospital Limbe, also called Mile 1 Hospital) is a 200-bed hospital in the Southwest Province of Cameroon and is the principal referral hospital for the region operated by the Cameroon Ministry of Health.

== History ==
The hospital was built ca. 1940 and was accorded the status of a Provincial Hospital in 1972. Since 2008, the Provinces of Cameroon officially have been called "Regions", and the "Provincial Hospitals" are now called "Regional Hospitals". The hospital's charter was to:

1. Offer the best quality of care to patients.
2. Offer pedagogic support to training institutions of health personnel in the country.
3. Carry out operational research within the context of improving patient welfare.
4. Co-operate and collaborate with other health institutions.

In the late 1990s and early 21st century, the hospital was suffering from major structural and organizational problems. By 2004, the attendance rate had dropped by 50%. Moreover, research revealed that there was a lack of knowledge among hospital staff. However, under the new directorship of Dr. Thompson Kinge (appointed 2005) the hospital has seen some major improvements. In July 2008, Nigerian Consul to the North West and South West provinces of Cameroon, Dr. Kenneth Nsor Nsor, awarded Kinge with an award for “recognition of outstanding meritorious services and good management.” Nsor praised Dr. Kinge for rehabilitating the hospital, and for providing quality care to the large Nigerian community in Limbe. Cameroonian journalist Aimé Potabo also credits Kinge for resuscitating the hospital, and praises the improvements of the last few years.

The hospital has received support from Cameroonians both within the country and abroad. Moreover, the Programme Germano-Camerounais de Santé has initiated training workshops in Cameroon, at least one of which (a workshop on sterilization) has been attended by technical staff from Limbe Provincial Hospital.

Like hospitals in many parts of the Third World, Limbe Regional Hospital still suffers from several problems including lack of certain hospital supplies and equipment such as ECG machines and incubators. The hospital administration is working hard to raise money in order to solve these problems, which negatively affect the population of the Southwest Province.

In 2008, a partnership agreement has been concluded between the Regional Hospital Limbe and the Faculty of Medicine of the University of Rostock in Germany. This partnership is financed by the "Gesellschaft für technische Zusammenarbeit (GTZ)", the Society for Technical Cooperation, which belongs to the German Ministry of Economic Cooperation. It is part of the ESTHER network ("Ensemble pour une Solidarité Thérapeutique Hospitalier En Réseau") of the European Union. The goal of this partnership is improving care for patients with HIV and AIDS. Through this ongoing ESTHER cooperation, the laboratory has been upgraded (introduction of PCR technology), and physicians as well as laboratory technicians have received training in Rostock / Germany. In addition, joint Continuing Medical Education workshops have been conducted in Limbe.

== Services ==
The hospital offers units for radiology, surgery, gynaecology and obstetrics, dental surgery, ophthalmology, pediatrics, physiotherapy, maternity and general medicine.

The Regional Hospital Limbe is the main teaching hospital for the medical students of the Faculty of Health Sciences of the nearby University of Buea.

== Research programme ==
Before 2000, practically no research had been done at Limbe Provincial Hospital. In the last few years, however, several research studies have been based at the hospital. A few examples are:

- Members of the Health Sciences Department at the University of Buea conducted research on the effects of nursing training on the control of nosocomial infections. A paper based on this research was presented at the International Conference on Overcoming Health Disparities in 2004.
- An international team of researchers in Cameroon and the United States of America did a study on adherence to antiretroviral therapy. The research was carried out at the hospital’s ART clinic.
- An ophthalmologist at Limbe Provincial Hospital has done research on treatment of blindness. This research was published in the British Journal of Ophthalmology.
- In August and September 2008, Gavin Steingo, a researcher from the University of Pennsylvania, carried out research on the acquisition and use of medical instruments at Limbe Provincial Hospital, on a grant from Merck Pharmaceuticals.
- Currently, research on the prevalence of opportunistic infections in HIV / AIDS patients is carried out in the context of the ESTHER partnership with the University of Rostock / Germany.

== Location ==
Limbe Provincial Hospital is located in the coastal town of Limbe, in the Southwest Province of Cameroon. The Southwest Province is one of only two Anglophone provinces in Cameroon; the other eight provinces are Francophone. Although there is no university in Limbe, there is a university in the nearby town of Buea (about 30 minutes drive). The University of Buea, which was founded in 1997, has a strong Health Sciences Department.

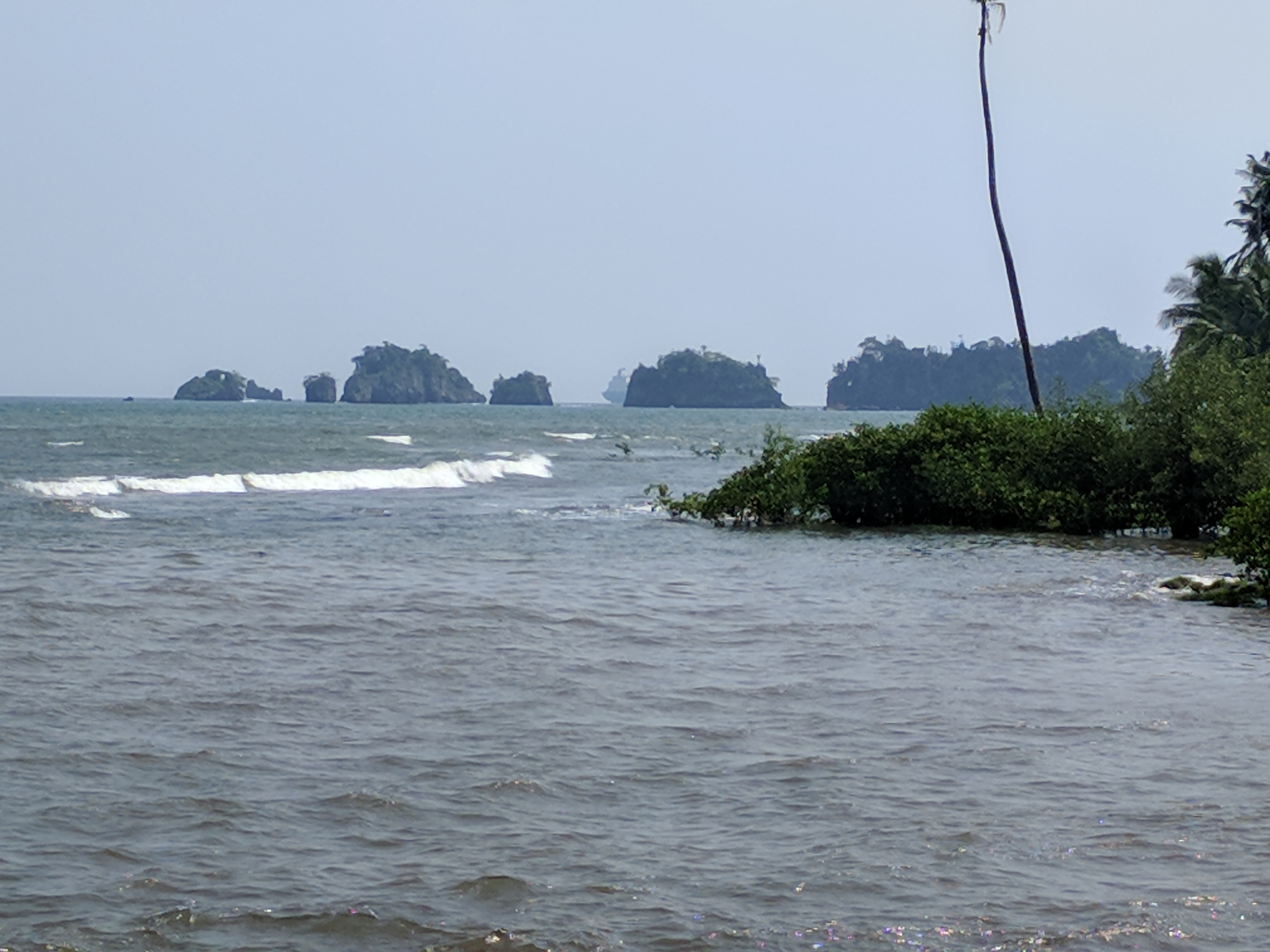
Limbe Atlantic Ocean

Limbe Provincial Hospital is referred to by locals as Mile 1 Hospital since it is exactly one mile away from the Atlantic Ocean. Heading out from the hospital down the hill and towards the ocean, one will soon reach Half Mile, the town center of Limbe. Continuing straight ahead, one will reach an area called Down Beach, which is right by the ocean. Moving away from the ocean from the hospital, one passes other parts of Limbe (Mile 2, Mile 3, Mile 4, etc.) and eventually leaves the town. A few miles later, one reaches the town of Mutengene. Continuing straight at Mutengene, one will arrive in Douala, the economic capital of Cameroon, in about one hour. Turning left at Mutengene, one will soon come to Mile 17 (17 miles (27 km) from the Ocean) in the town of Buea. Continuing on the road through Buea one will reach Nigeria.
