= Manoka =

- Commune and town
- Location in Cameroon
- Coordinates: 3°51′19″N 9°36′53″E
- Country: Cameroon
- Time zone: UTC+1 (WAT)

Manoka is a town and commune in the Littoral Region of Cameroon. It lies on Manoka island in the south of the Wouri estuary, within the Douala Edéa Wildlife Reserve.

== Geography ==
The climate is of the equatorial type and is characterized by very high humidity of around 85%, especially in the rainy season; low thermal amplitudes that are not very variable depending on the location, with an average annual temperature of 27.2 °C; and heavy rainfall, varying from 2400 to 4000 mm per year.

The town is situated on an island of the same name, the largest in Cameroon. The island is mostly covered in forest (65% mangrove forest and 25% terrestrial forests).

55% of the island is part of the Douala-Edéa National Park and another 30% of the island is given to a community forest.

The island has an average elevation of 12 meters and 70% of the island has is below 10m above sea level.

The indigenous population of the island are called the Malimba and traditionally both genders make money by fishing.

Petroleum has been found in the mangrove sub-soil. Guarding the area is the Rapid Intervention Brigade which has been observed intercepting canoes, small boats and even large ships in sea. The unit is on alert 24/7.

== Population ==
The island has a population of approximately 3371 in around 759 households. 90% of the island's population are foreigners (mostly Nigerians and Ghanaians) with Nigerians outnumbering Cameroonian nationals, a lot of foreigners settling because of the abundant fish stocks. The Nigerian diaspora are supportive of the People's Democratic Party.

The island's economy is mostly based around fishing, sand mining and logging. Illegal logging of Rhizophora racemosa, Rhizophora harrisonii, and Avicennia germinans for timber and poles has caused widespread deforestation.

Villages on the far north of the island are in danger of flooding due to coastal erosion during high tides.

Bicycles are considered a luxury and according to interviews done by the Cameroon Post there were only three on the entire island.

The local priest has encouraged the business Glencore, who is conducting petroleum prospecting in area, to create more jobs stating that the jobless were involved in: three major activities; alcohol, sex and drugs.

== Prison ==
Ruins of the German prison in Manoka Island, originally built on the shore but nowadays surrounded by the sea

During the German colonisation Kamerun the Germans built a prison on Manoka Island.

On May 10, 1914, Duala Manga Bell was arrested and detained here. He was executed by hanging on the 8th of August 1914.

The prison was abandoned after the German defeat in World War I. Up to fifty machine guns can be found buried in the water in the surrounding area.

== See also ==
- Communes of Cameroon
