= Yaoundé General Hospital =

- Location within Cameroon

Geography
- Location: Yaoundé, Cameroon
- Coordinates: 3.9066°N 11.5414°E

Organisation
- Type: General, Teaching

Services
- Beds: 302

History
- Founded: 1985

Links
- Lists: Hospitals in Cameroon

The Yaoundé General Hospital (Hôpital Général de Yaoundé - HGY) is a hospital in Yaoundé, Cameroon, established in 1985. It is a teaching center and reference hospital for others in the region.

The hospital was designed by the C. Cacoub and Buban Ngu Design Group and built by SBBM & Six Construct. It covers an area of 20,301 square metres and as of 2001 had 302 beds. The hospital provides medicine, surgery, obstetrics, gynaecology and pediatrics. It is the only hospital in the Central Region with a dialysis center. In July 2011, some patients were turned away due to shortage of dialysis units.
