= Yaoundé =

Capital of Cameroon

- Capital city
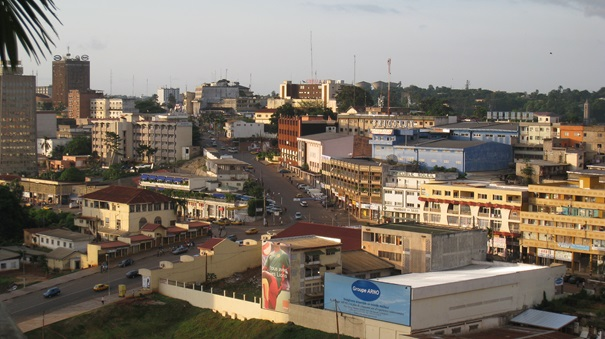
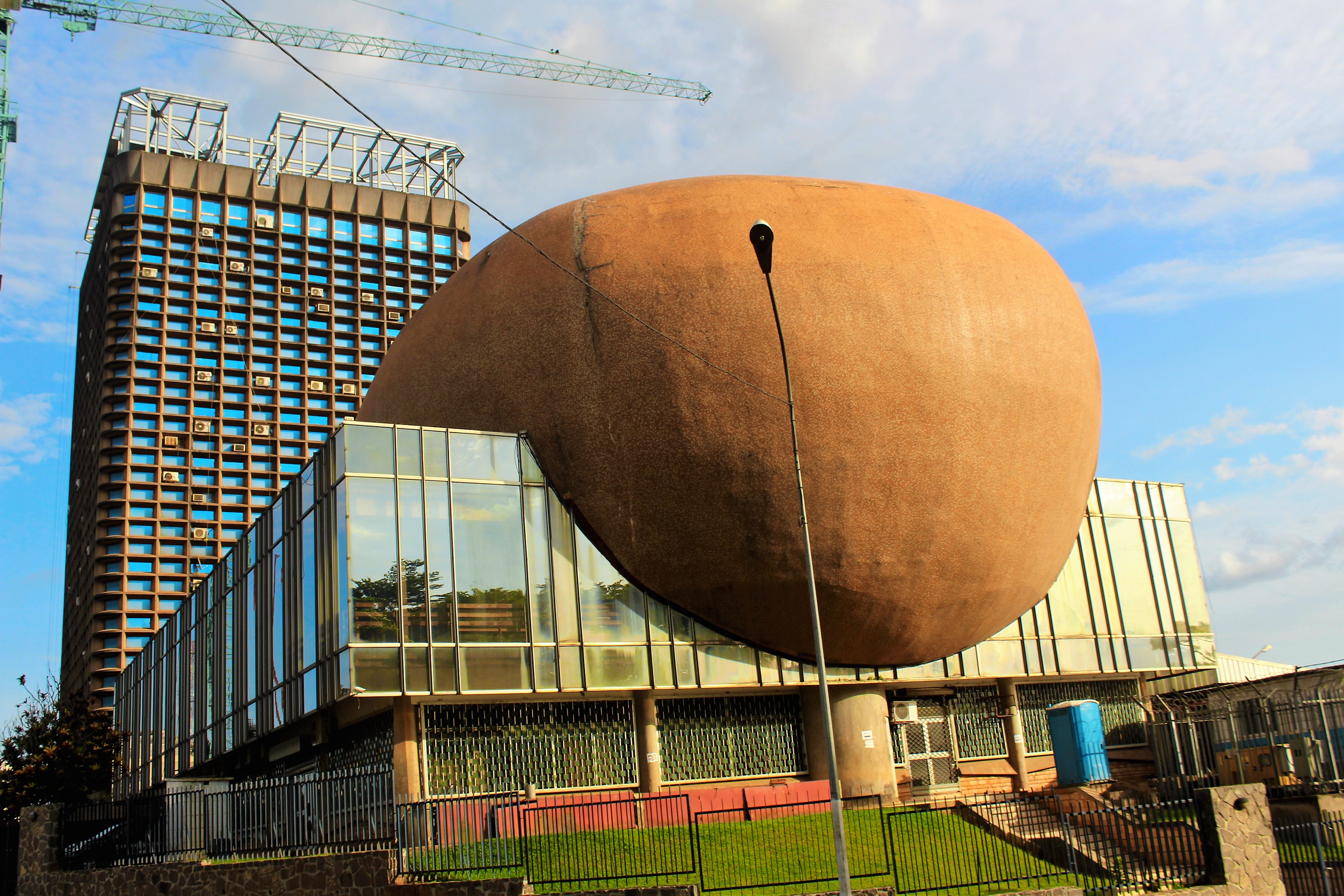
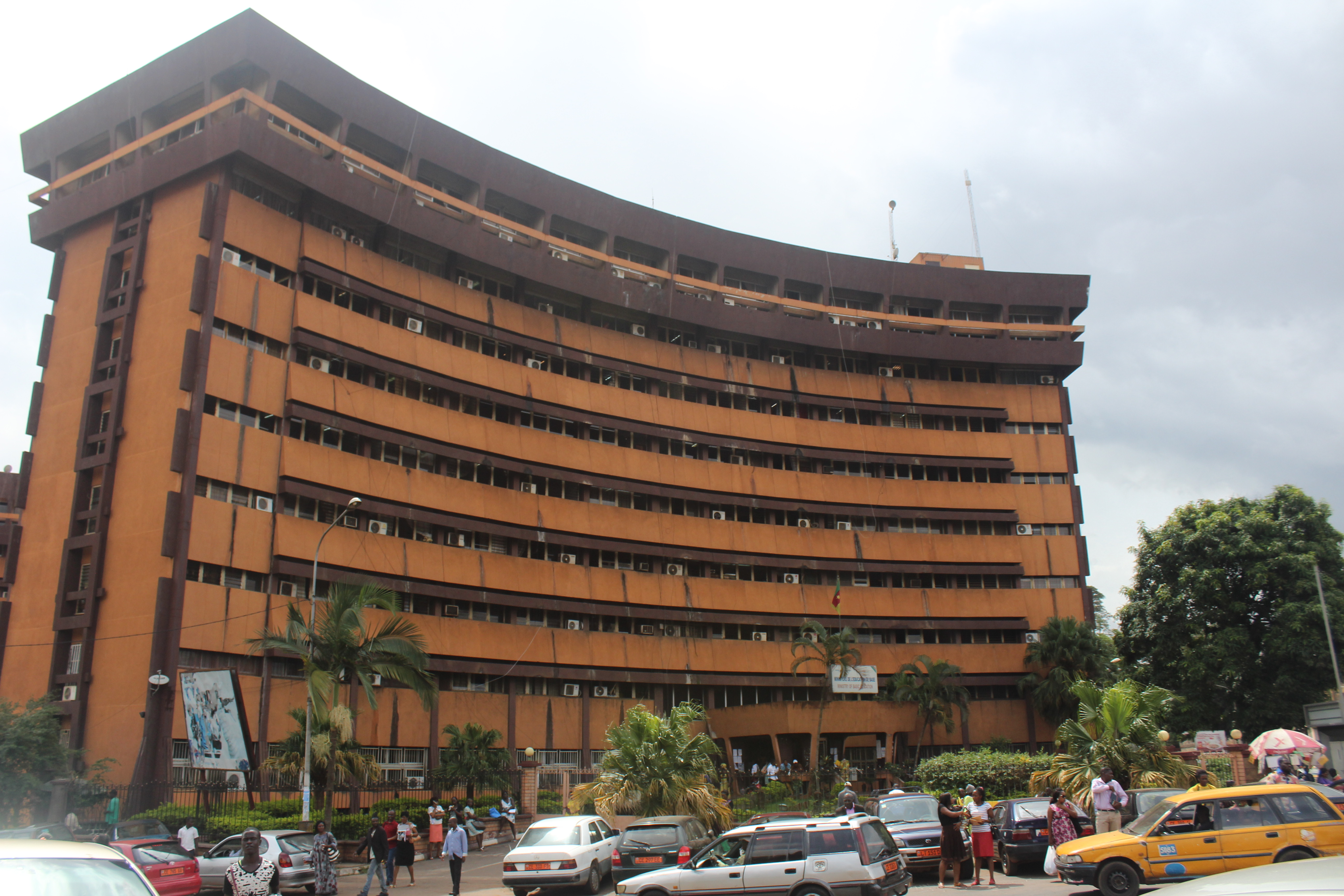
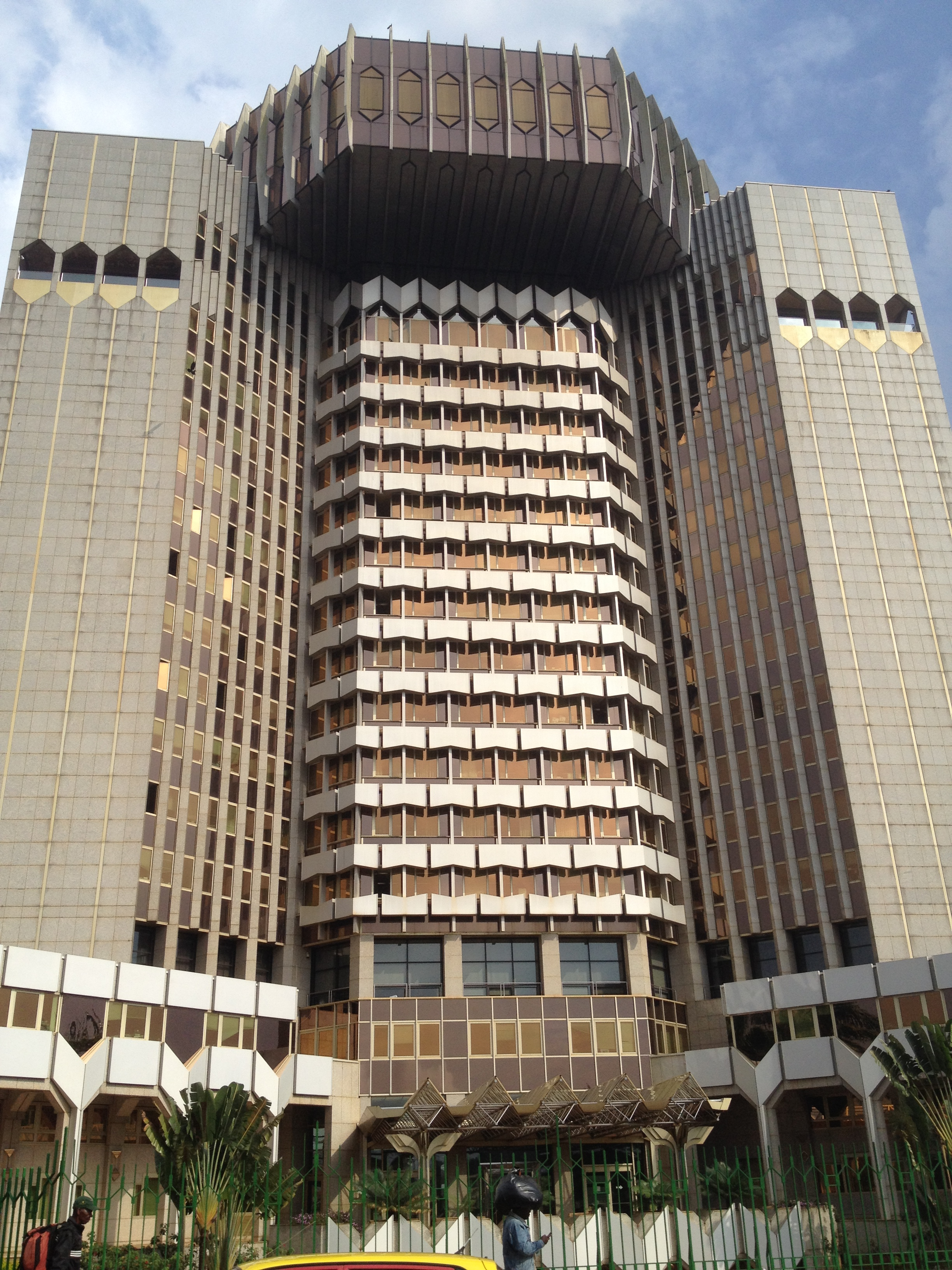
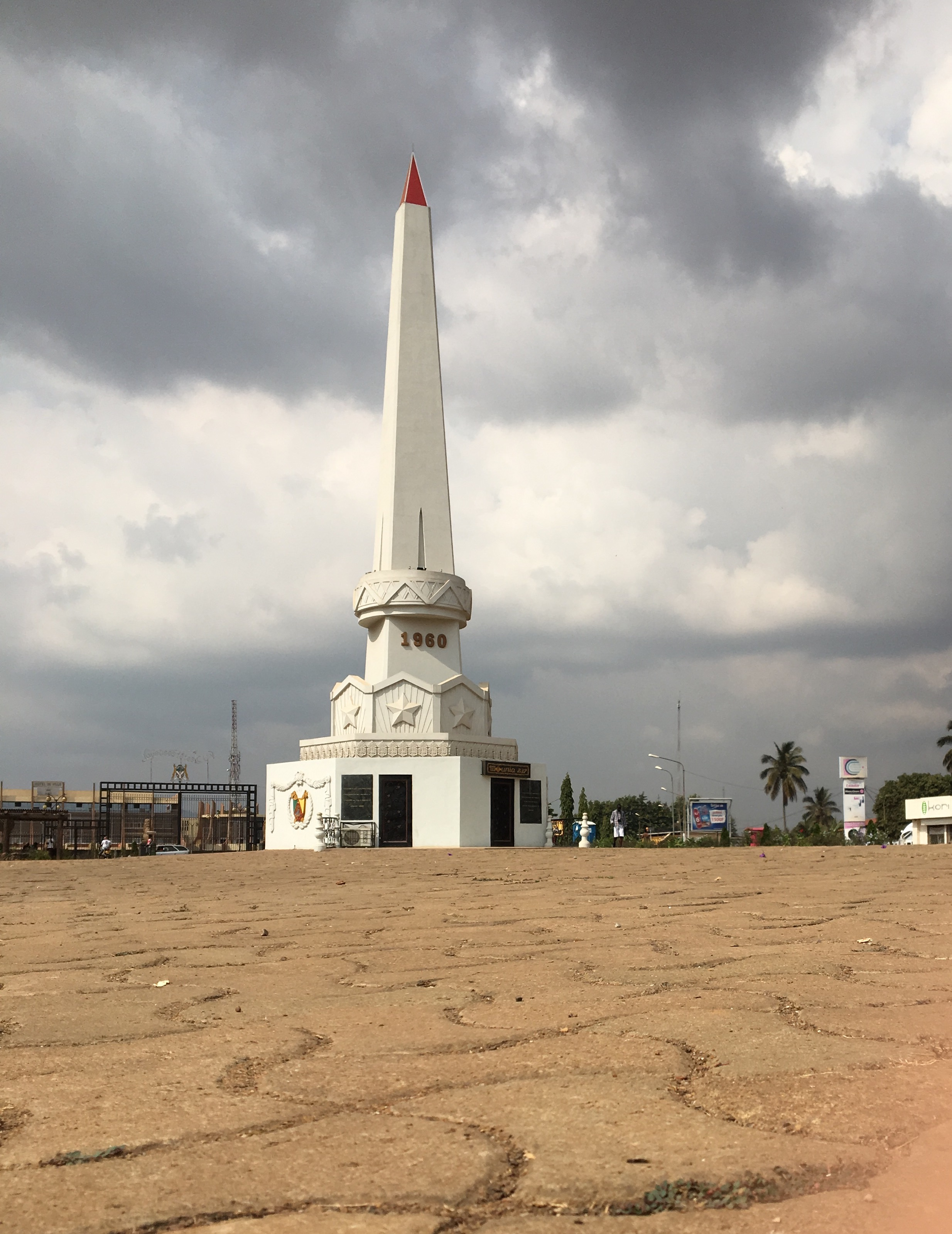
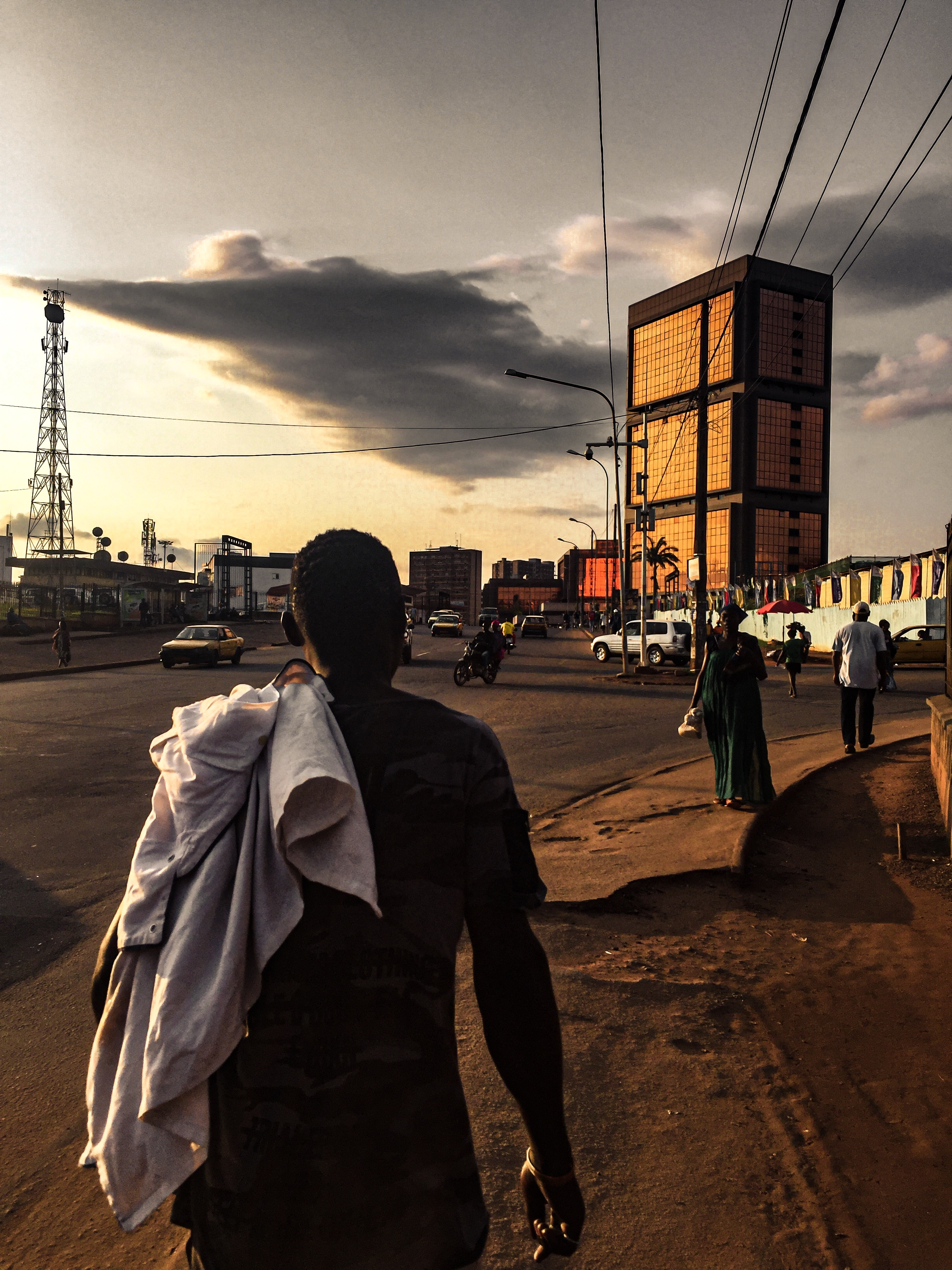
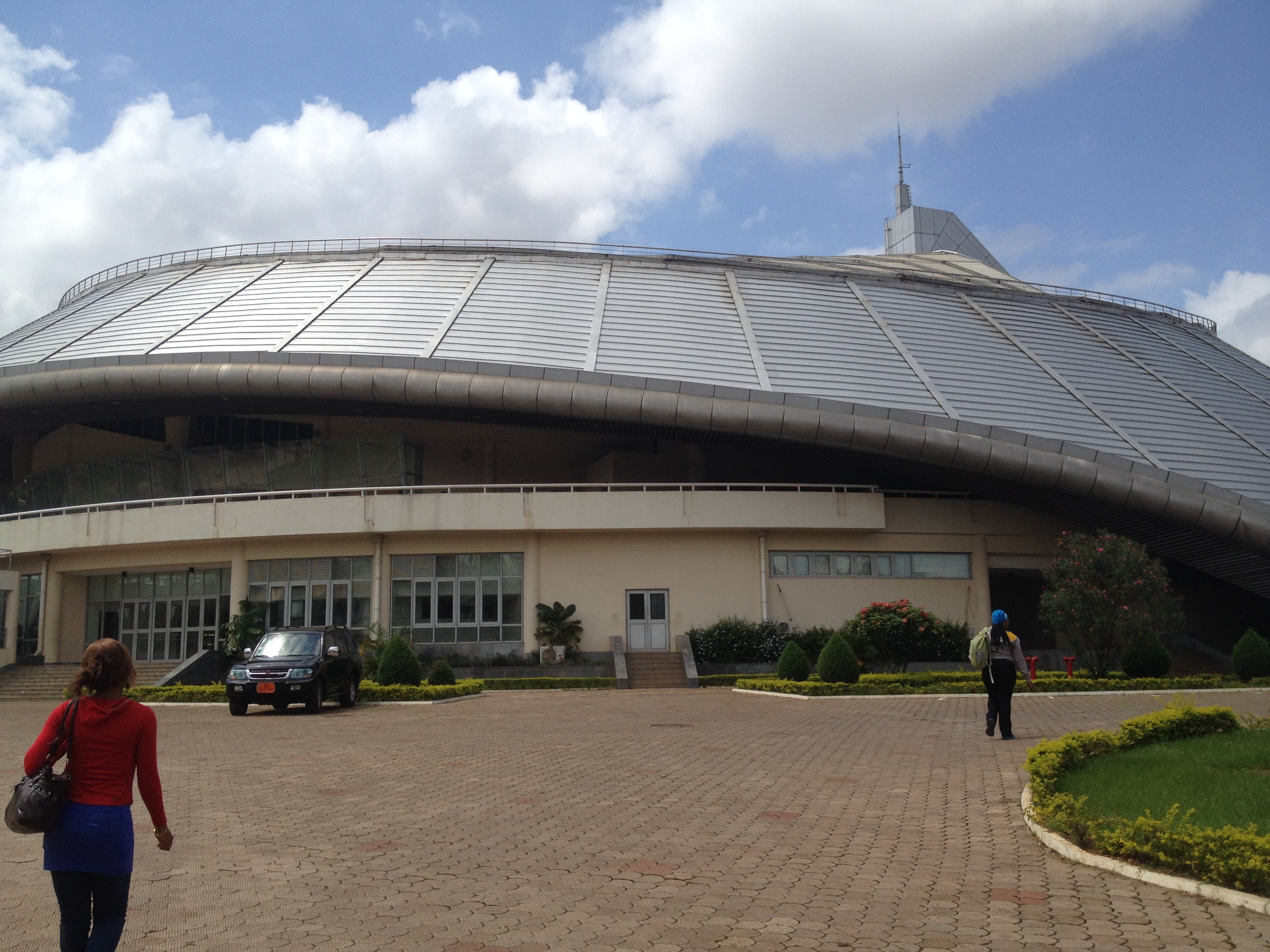
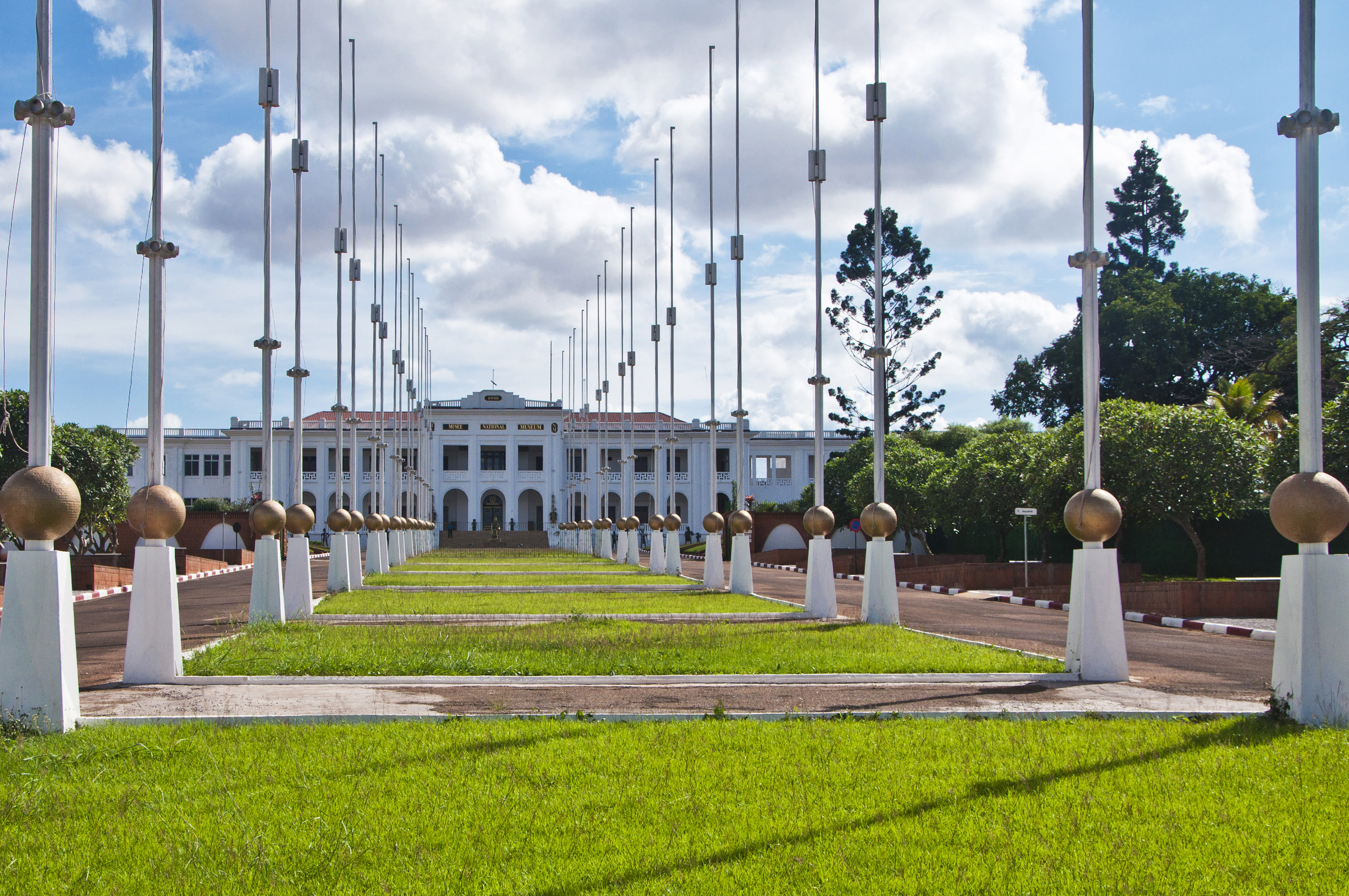
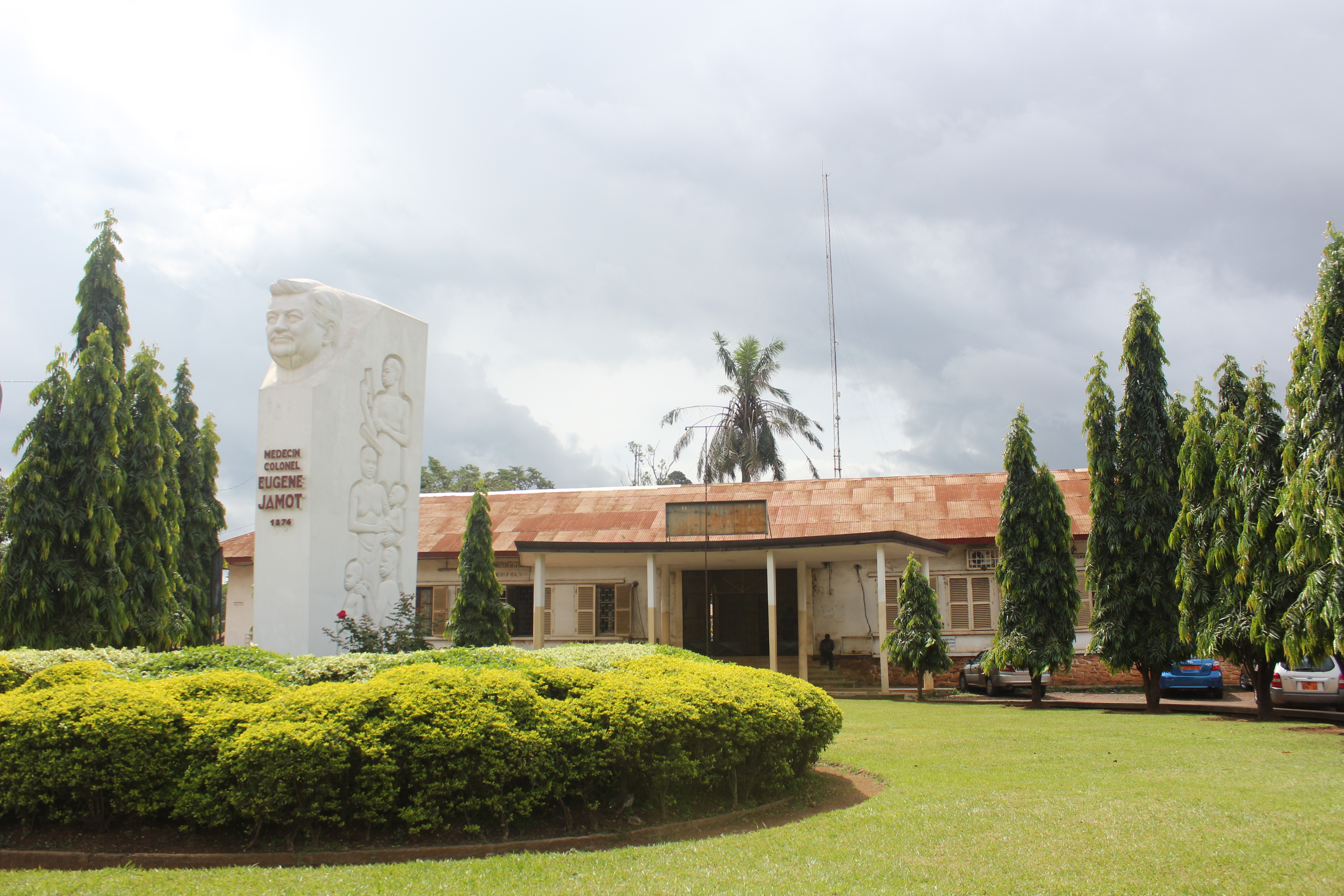
- Yaoundé skyline Caisse Nationale de Prévoyance Sociale building Ministère de l'éducation headquarter Bank of Central African States building Independence square Immeuble de la Mort Yaoundé Sports Palace Musée National du Cameroun Centre Pasteur

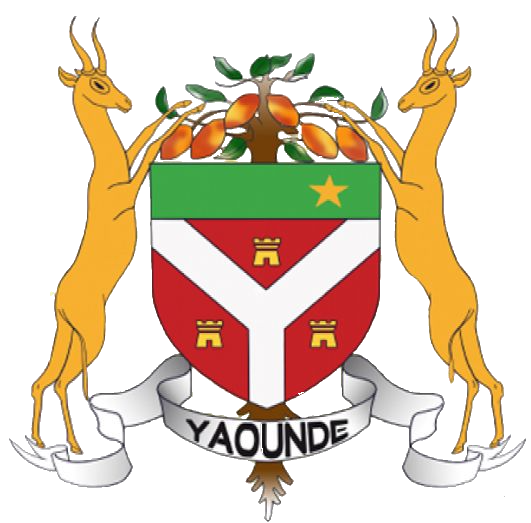
- Coat of arms
- Nickname: La Ville aux Sept Collines
- Interactive map of Yaoundé
- Location within Cameroon Location within Africa
- Coordinates: 3°52′N 11°31′E
- Country: Cameroon
- Region: Centre
- Department: Mfoundi

Area
  - Total: 180 km^{2} (69 sq mi)
- Elevation: 726 m (2,382 ft)

Population (2025)
  - Total: 3,762,900
  - Rank: 2nd
  - Density: 21,000/km^{2} (54,000/sq mi)
- Time zone: UTC+01:00 (WAT)

Yaoundé (UK: /jɑːˈʊndeɪ, -ˈuːn-/; US: /ˌjɑːʊnˈdeɪ/, French pronunciation: [ja.unde]) is the capital city of Cameroon. It has a population of more than 2.8 million, which makes it the second-largest city in the country after the port city Douala. It lies in the Centre Region of the nation at an elevation of about 750 metres (2,500 ft) above sea level.

The outpost of Epsumb or Jeundo was founded between the Nyong and Sanaga rivers at the northern edge of the area's forests in 1887 by German explorers as a trading base for rubber and ivory. A military garrison was built in 1895 which enabled further colonization. After Imperial Germany's defeat in World War I, France held eastern Cameroon as a mandate, and Yaoundé was chosen to become the capital of the colony in 1922.

Douala remained the more important settlement, but Yaoundé saw rapid growth and continued as the seat of government for the Republic of Cameroon upon its independence in 1960. Most of Yaounde’s economy is still centred on the administrative structure but major industries in Yaoune include tobacco, dairy products, beer, clay, glass goods and timber. The city has many striking monuments and buildings, such as the Presidential Palace and Palais des Congres.

== History ==
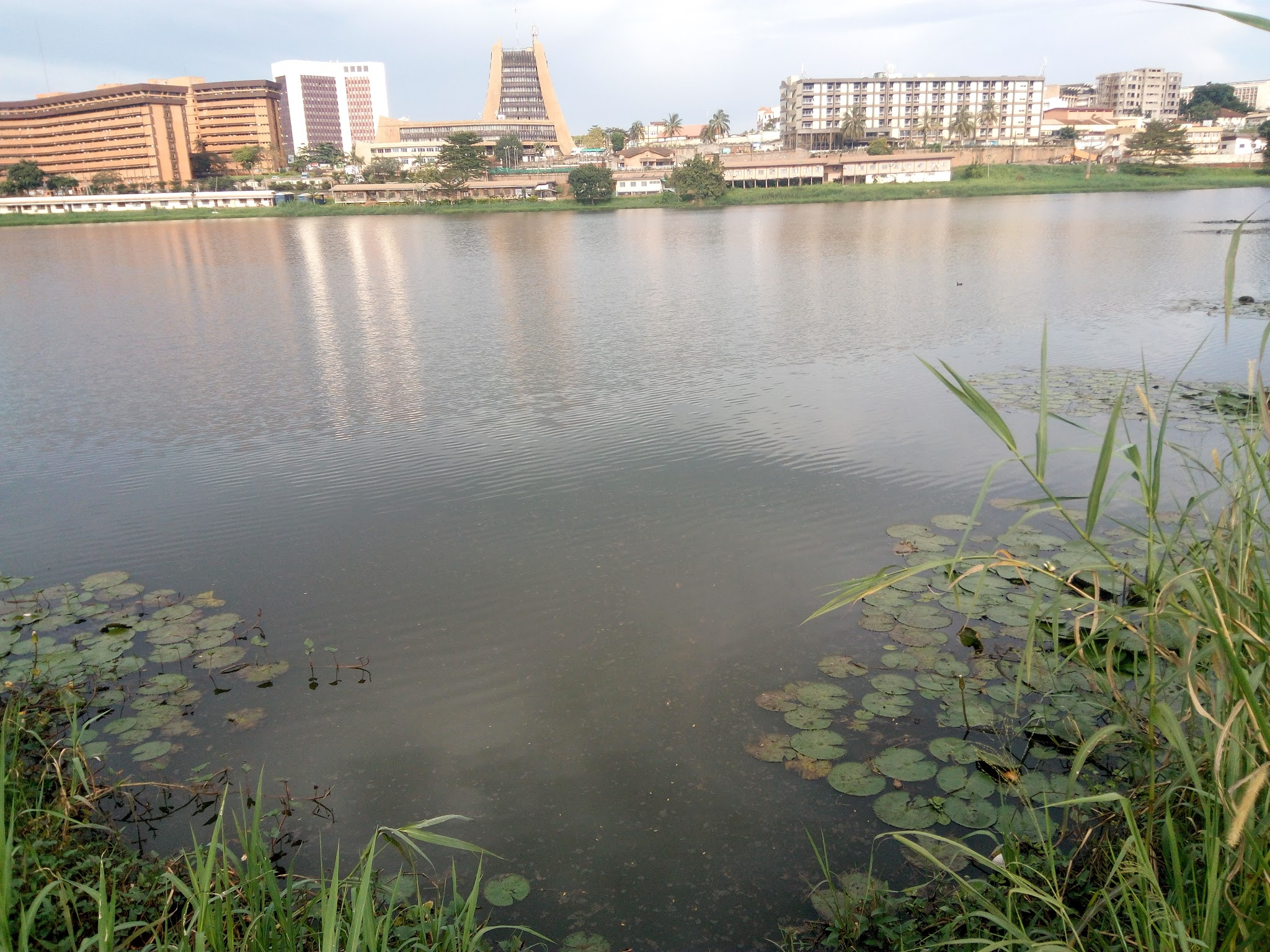
Yaoundé Lake

The earliest inhabitants of Cameroon were likely the Bakas (pygmies), who still inhabit the forests of the south and east regions. Bantu speakers originating in the Cameroonian highlands were among the first groups to move out before other invaders. During the late 1770s and early 1800s, the Fulani—a pastoral Islamic people of the western Sahel—conquered most of what is now northern Cameroon, subjugating or displacing its largely non-Muslim inhabitants.

The outpost of Epsumb or Jeundo was founded between the Nyong and Sanaga rivers at the northern edge of the area's forests in 1887, 1888, or February 1889 by the German explorers Lt. Richard Kund and Hans Tappenbeck by the agreement of the chiefs of Ela Esono. (Note: „Ich bemerke nur, daß der Lieutenant Tappenbeck und ich eine Station in größeren Maßstabe auf dem Innerafrikanischen Plateau zwischen den Flüssen Yong u Zannaga an dem Platze angelegt haben, der auf der Karte mit dem Namen Epsumb bezeichnet ist. (3° 48' N.) Die Entfernung von der Küste beträgt 20 Tagesmärsche...“) From December 1889 to May 1895, it was occupied by the German botanist Georg August Zenker as an agricultural research station named Jaunde after the local Yaunde or Ewondo people. (Note: Kund and Tappenbeck had used the title "Jaunde" to refer to the area but not the settlement or site itself.) His settlement served as a base for the area's rubber and ivory trade, purchasing these from the natives in exchange for imported clothing and iron. It was also known in English as Yaunde Station. Major Dominik's establishment of a military garrison at the site in 1895 permitted a Pallotine mission and religious school at nearby Mvolyé (now a suburb).

During World War I, Jaunde was occupied by Belgian troops from the Congo. After Imperial Germany's defeat in that war, France held eastern Cameroon as a mandate of the League of Nations and Yaoundé was chosen to become the capital of the colony in 1922. Douala long remained the more important settlement, but Yaounde saw rapid growth after 1958 due to the cocoa crisis and unrest along the coast. It continued as the seat of government for the Republic of Cameroon upon its independence.

== Economy ==
Most of Yaounde’s economy is centred on the administrative structure of the civil service and the diplomatic services. Owing to these high-profile central structures, Yaounde has a higher standard of living and security than the rest of Cameroon.

Major industries in Yaounde include tobacco, dairy products, beer, clay, glass goods and timber. It is also a regional distribution centre for coffee, cocoa, copra, sugar cane and rubber.

Local residents engage in urban agriculture. The city is estimated to have "50,000 pigs and over a million chickens."

In 2010, under Mayor Jean Claude Adjessa Melingui, Yaounde began a flood reduction project, the Yaounde City Sanitation Master Plan, to deal with "severe floods [that] disrupted the city 15 to 20 times a year, affecting as many as 100,000 people at a time." After four years, the frequency of flooding had been reduced from fifteen to three times a year, and cases of water-borne diseases such as typhoid and malaria were reduced by almost half. Although Melingui died in 2013, local officials are continuing his efforts to transform the city. Ongoing improvements to sanitation infrastructure are being carried out under a "$152 million plan, largely financed by loans, primarily from the African Development Bank and the French Development Agency", slated for completion in 2017.

Despite the security issues and humanitarian crises that have plagued the central African nation, its economy remains stable. In fact, there is diversification of its productive economic activities, with the services sector contributing about half of the total domestic production. However, like many African countries, Cameroon has long suffered from corruption, which dominates almost all the sectors, particularly in the capital city. Oil, gas and mining revenues are rarely reported, which implies massive graft. In addition, there is weak protection of real and intellectual property, and the judicial system is vulnerable to political manipulation.

According to Yaounde City Council data, over 130 floods struck the city between 1980 and 2014, causing massive loss of life and economic damage. However, there has been a reduction of flooding in the city since the establishment of a sanitation master plan to address the issue. Another measure was to relocate people living along the drainage routes and in low-lying flood zones.

== Architecture ==
The city centre houses government offices, some hotels, and the central market. The Bastos district, with most homes owned by Cameroonians, is home to foreign embassies and the expatriate European, American and other continental communities (drawn mainly from the diplomatic corps). The presidential palace and compound are in the Etoudi district.

Also found in Yaoundé are:

- the Reunification Monument
- the Sport Palace (Palais des Sports)
- Palais des Congrès

There is a small zoo in the Mvog-Betsi neighbourhood. Yaounde has a small assortment of pubs, nightclubs and restaurants. A distance outside Yaoundé is the NGO Ape Action Africa, which rescues and rehabilitates great apes threatened with extinction by the illegal bushmeat and deforestation trades.

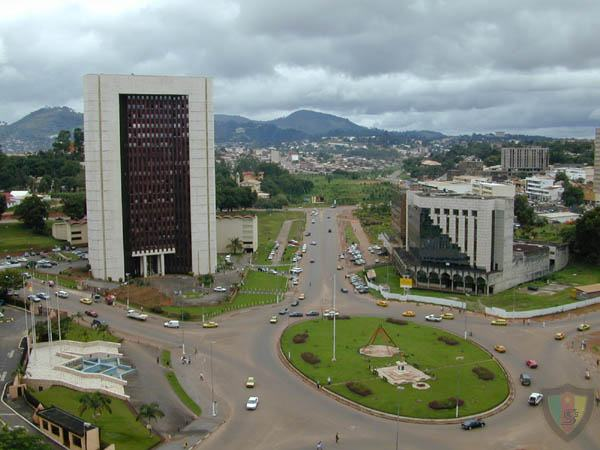
A roundabout near the Place du 20 Mai

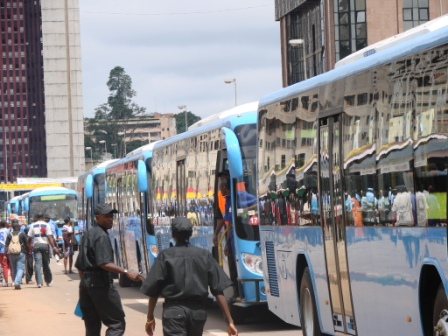
Buses in Yaoundé

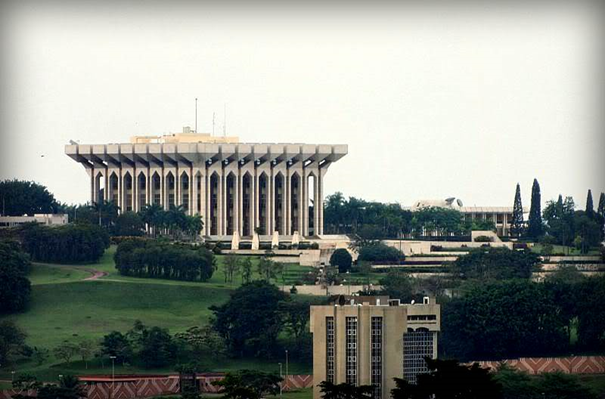
Yaoundé Unity Palace – Cameroon Presidency

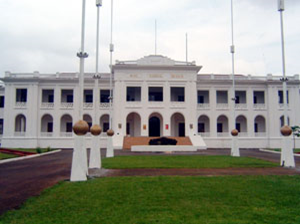
Cameroon National Museum

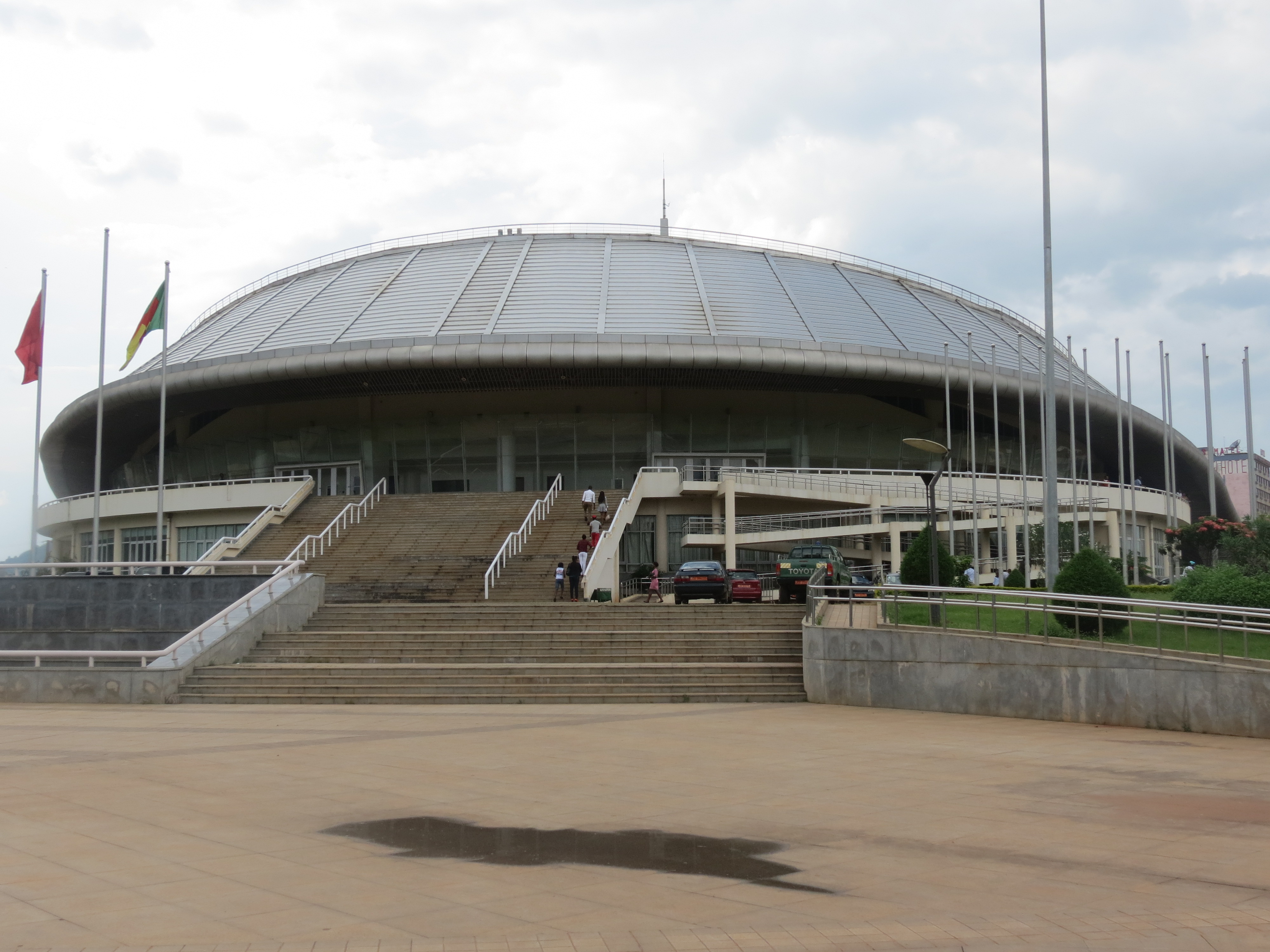
Yaoundé Sport Palace

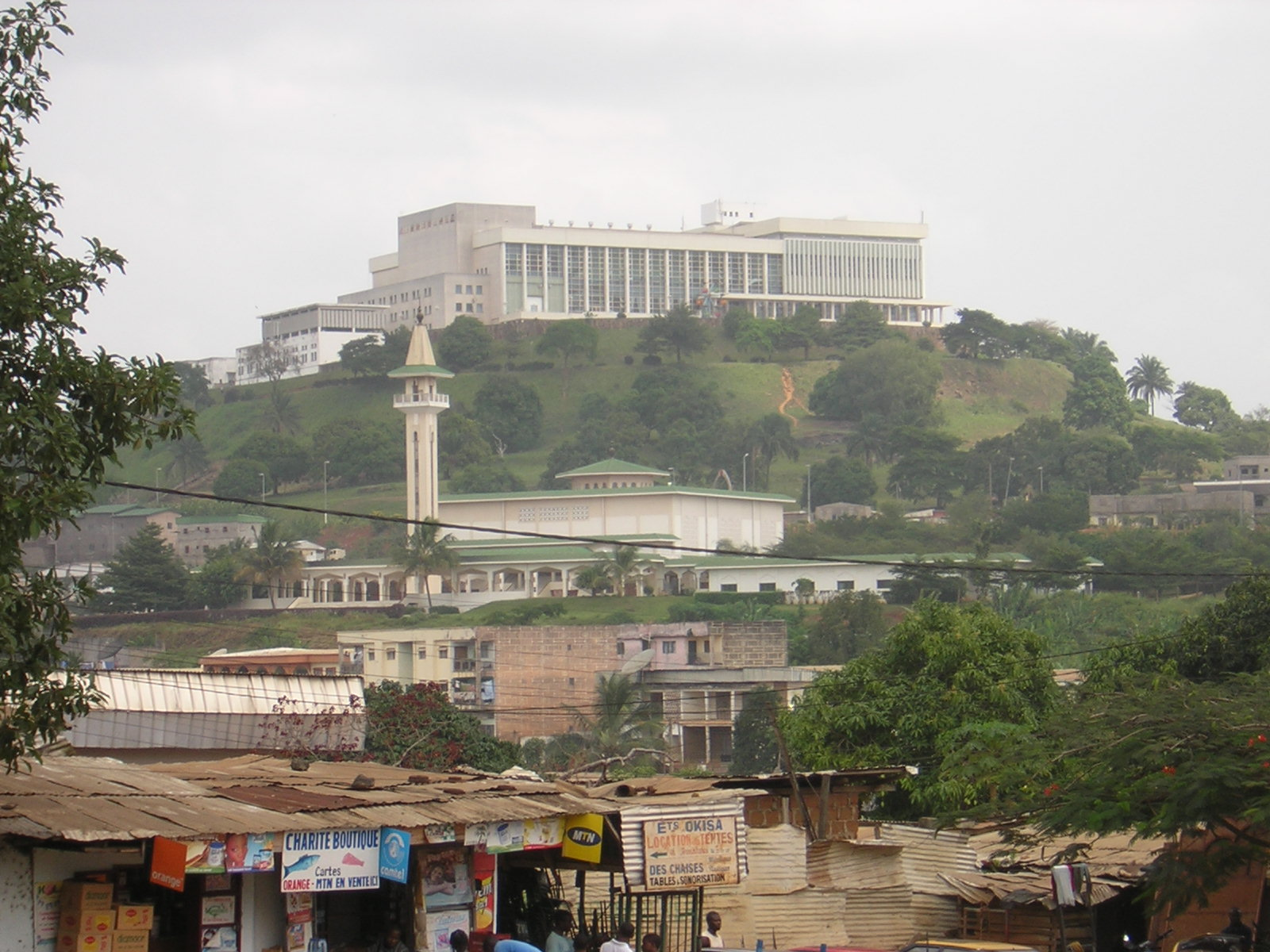
Palais des Congrès

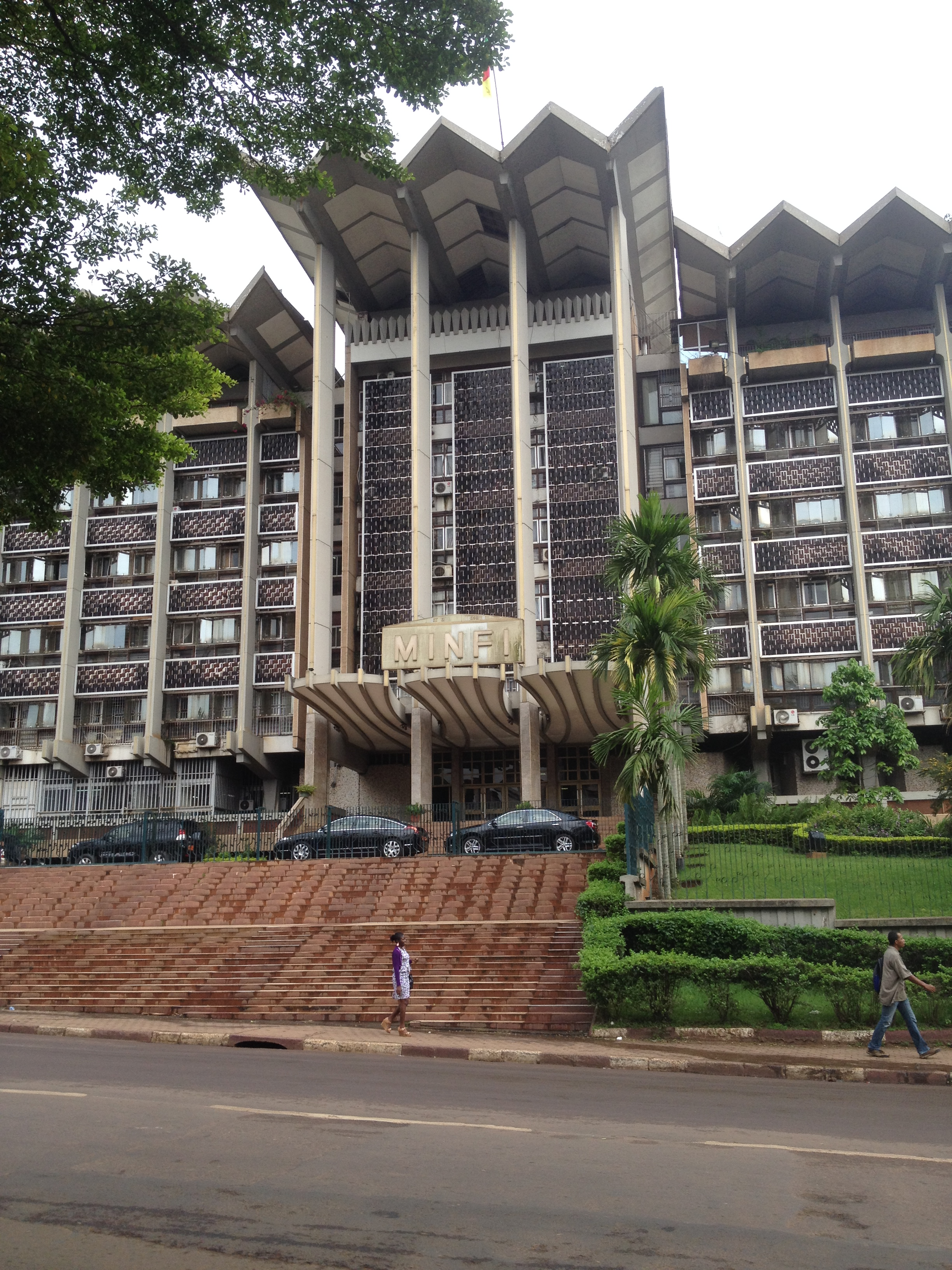
The Ministry of Finance

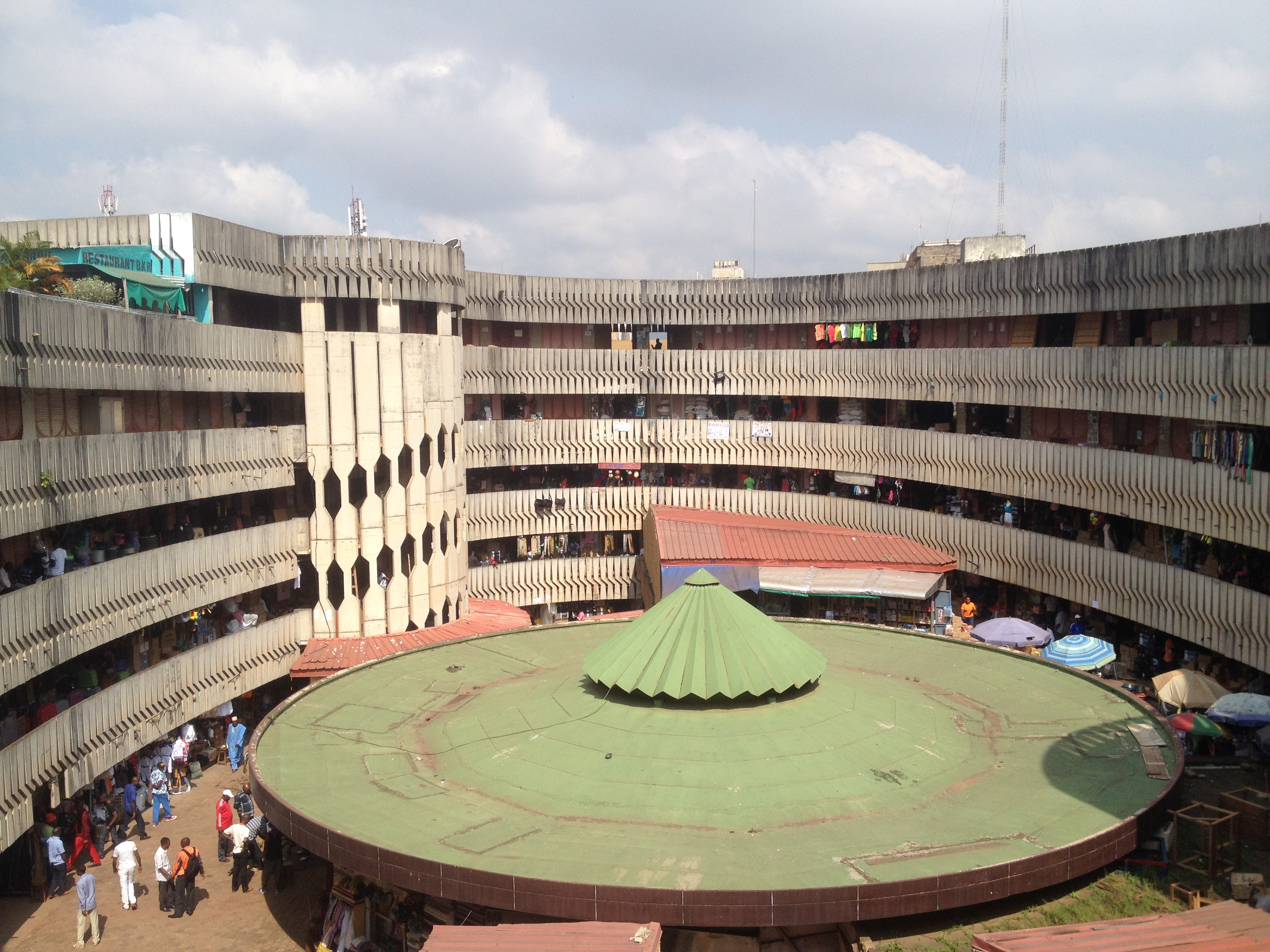
The Central Market

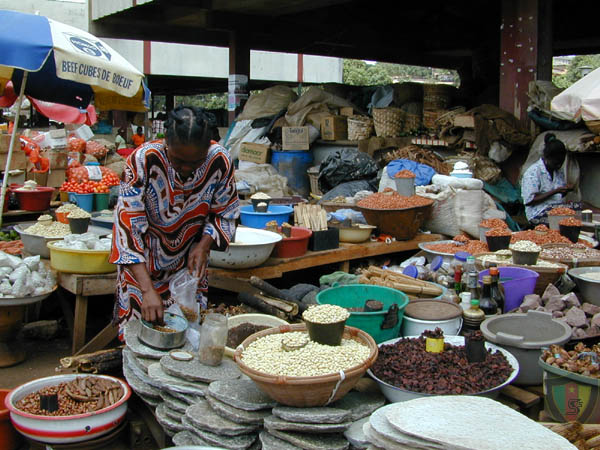
Mfoundi market

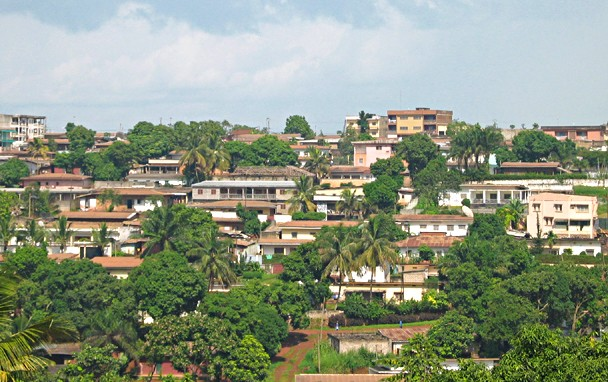
A view of a Yaoundé suburb

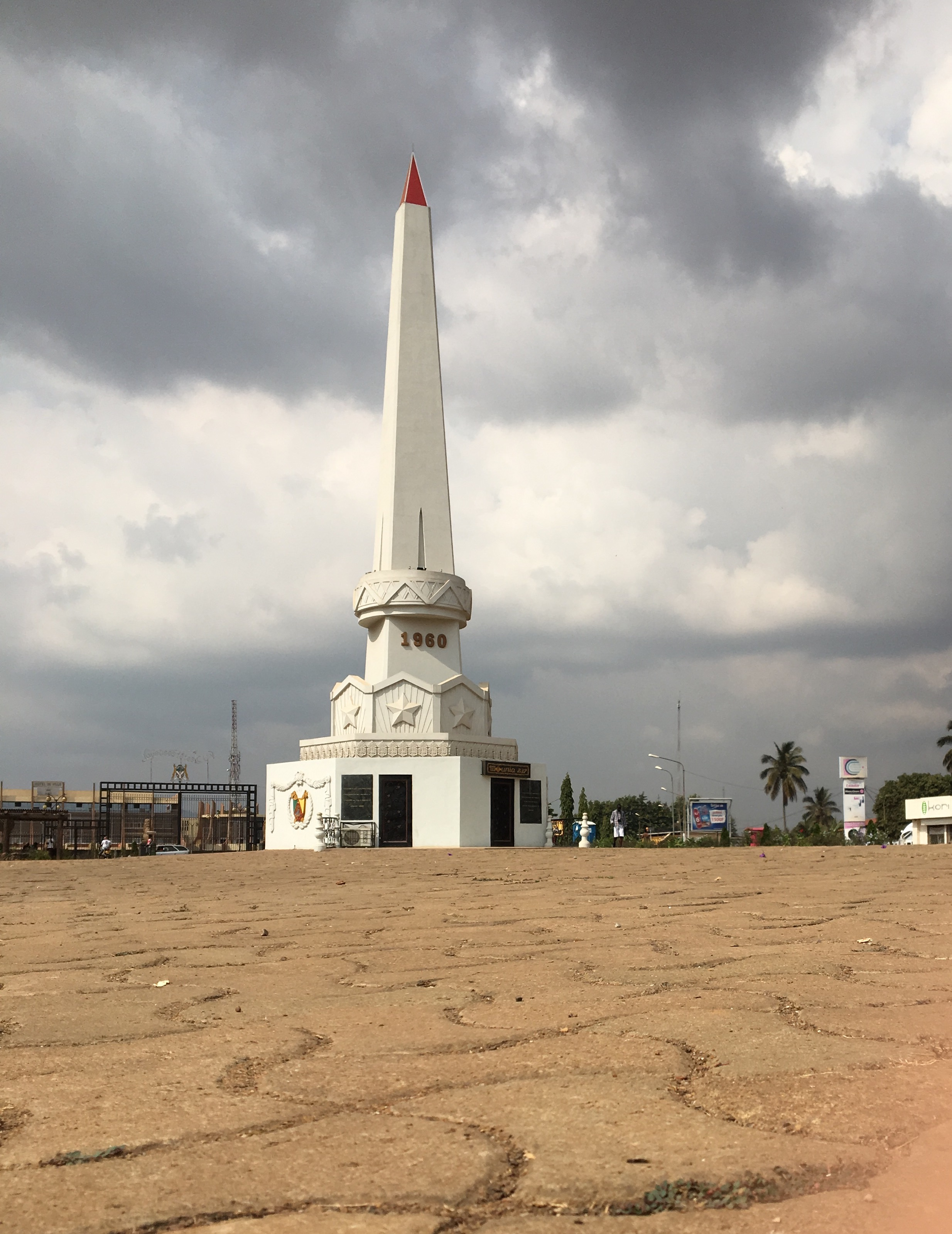
Independence square Cameroon

== Culture ==
- the Cameroon Art Museum (located in a former Benedictine monastery)
- the Cameroon National Museum (located in the former presidential palace)
- the Blackitude Museum
- the Afhemi Museum
- The Yaoundé Municipal Lake
- The Mvog-Betsi Zoo-Botanic Park
- The Congress Centre in Tsinga

Ewondo Populaire is a Beti-based pidgin spoken in Yaoundé.

== Places of worship ==
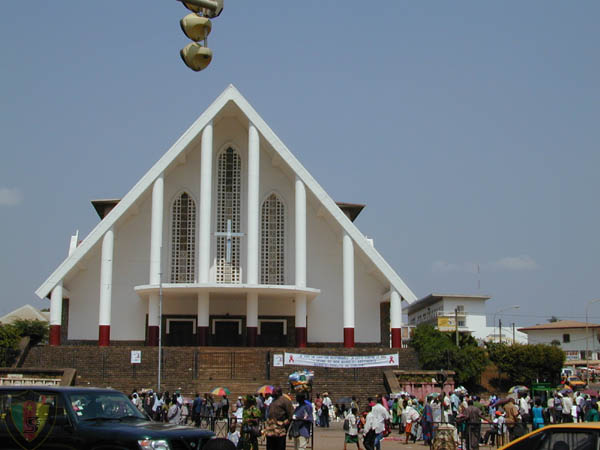
Our Lady of Victories Cathedral, Yaoundé

The places of worship in the city are predominantly Christian churches: Roman Catholic Archdiocese of Yaoundé (Catholic Church), Christian Missionary Fellowship International and Associated Churches (Pentecostal), Evangelical Church of Cameroon (World Communion of Reformed Churches), Presbyterian Church in Cameroon (World Communion of Reformed Churches), Union of Baptist Churches in Cameroon (Baptist World Alliance), Full Gospel Mission Cameroon (Assemblies of God). There are also Muslim mosques.

== Climate ==
Yaoundé features a tropical wet and dry climate (Aw), and it is thermally equatorial rather than tropical, with a narrow range of monthly temperatures throughout the year. However, primarily due to the altitude, temperatures are not quite as hot as one would expect for a city located near the equator. Yaoundé has a lengthy wet season, covering a ten-month span between March and November. However, there is a noticeable decrease in precipitation within the wet season, seen during the month of July, almost giving the city the appearance of having two separate rainy seasons; this is because the city is only slightly north of the equator. It is primarily due to the relative lull in precipitation during this month that Yaoundé features a tropical wet and dry climate, as opposed to a tropical monsoon climate.

Climate data for Yaoundé (1991-2020), extremes 1913-present
Month	Jan	Feb	Mar	Apr	May	Jun	Jul	Aug	Sep	Oct	Nov	Dec	Year
Record high °C (°F)	35.4 (95.7)	37.0 (98.6)	36.1 (97.0)	35.5 (95.9)	33.7 (92.7)	32.2 (90.0)	31.0 (87.8)	31.5 (88.7)	32.5 (90.5)	33.2 (91.8)	34.0 (93.2)	34.5 (94.1)	37.0 (98.6)
Mean daily maximum °C (°F)	30.6 (87.1)	31.7 (89.1)	31.1 (88.0)	30.4 (86.7)	29.8 (85.6)	28.5 (83.3)	27.4 (81.3)	27.4 (81.3)	27.5 (81.5)	28.8 (83.8)	29.5 (85.1)	30.0 (86.0)	29.5 (85.1)
Daily mean °C (°F)	24.8 (76.6)	25.8 (78.4)	25.5 (77.9)	25.0 (77.0)	24.8 (76.6)	23.9 (75.0)	23.1 (73.6)	23.2 (73.8)	23.7 (74.7)	24.0 (75.2)	24.5 (76.1)	24.6 (76.3)	24.4 (75.9)
Mean daily minimum °C (°F)	19.1 (66.4)	19.8 (67.6)	19.8 (67.6)	19.8 (67.6)	19.8 (67.6)	19.3 (66.7)	18.9 (66.0)	18.9 (66.0)	19.1 (66.4)	19.1 (66.4)	19.4 (66.9)	19.1 (66.4)	19.3 (66.7)
Record low °C (°F)	13.5 (56.3)	14.2 (57.6)	15.0 (59.0)	16.0 (60.8)	15.5 (59.9)	14.4 (57.9)	14.1 (57.4)	16.0 (60.8)	15.1 (59.2)	14.9 (58.8)	14.5 (58.1)	12.8 (55.0)	12.8 (55.0)
Average precipitation mm (inches)	21.0 (0.83)	47.4 (1.87)	124.6 (4.91)	171.3 (6.74)	198.5 (7.81)	143.0 (5.63)	60.1 (2.37)	78.4 (3.09)	235.2 (9.26)	294.1 (11.58)	108.3 (4.26)	26.5 (1.04)	1,508.4 (59.39)
Average precipitation days (≥ 1 mm)	2.1	4.1	10.3	13.2	15.5	13.1	7.4	8.9	17.8	21.3	9.8	2.4	125.9
Average relative humidity (%)	70.4	68.2	73.5	76.8	79.1	81.4	83.5	83.0	81.6	80.8	77.2	73.0	77.4
Mean monthly sunshine hours	186.0	179.2	173.6	168.0	164.3	123.0	96.1	105.4	114.0	130.2	165.0	189.1	1,793.9
Source 1: World Meteorological Organization NOAA (sun 1961–1990)
Source 2: BBC Weather

== Transport ==
Two trans-African automobile routes pass through Yaoundé:

- Tripoli-Cape Town Highway
- Lagos-Mombasa Highway

Many bus companies operate from the city; particularly in the Nsam and Mvan districts. Frequent buses run on the road between Yaoundé and Douala, which has witnessed several fatal accidents. Travel time by road between Douala and Yaounde is approximately 3 hours. Traffic in the city can be heavy during weekdays, but is very light during the weekends. Yaoundé has made significant progress in infrastructure, especially road construction.

Yaoundé Nsimalen International Airport is a major civilian hub, while nearby Yaoundé Airport is used by the military.

Train lines run west to the port city of Douala and north to N'Gaoundéré.

Preceding station	Camrail	Following station
Terminus	Yaoundé–Ngaoundéré	Nanga Eboko towards Ngaoundéré
Edéa towards Douala	Douala–Yaoundé	Terminus

== Education ==
Cameroon is a bilingual country, where English and French are both official languages; therefore in the city there is a coexistence of French educational system schools, where the degree giving access to university is the Baccalaureate, and all the education is in French, and the English educational system schools, where the degree giving access to university is the GCE Advanced level.

There are three American schools in Cameroon, the American International School of Yaounde (AISOY) and Rain Forest International School (RFIS), and the American School of Douala (ASD). There is also one Turkish School, The Amity College/School.

Yaoundé is the site of several universities: the University of Yaoundé II (on a campus outside of town), the Protestant University of Central Africa (UPAC) and the Catholic University of Central Africa (UCAC). Several of the nation's professional schools are also located in Yaounde (Higher Teacher's training college, École Militaire InterArmes du Cameroun) as well as various schools for Engineers (Polytech), Doctors (CUSS), Nurses and Diplomats.

== Healthcare ==
The largest hospital is the Central Hospital of Yaoundé (Hôpital Central de Yaoundé) with 650 beds. Yaoundé General Hospital (Hôpital Général de Yaoundé – HGY) had 302 beds when it was built in 1985. Other hospitals are the Yaoundé Gynaecology, Obstetrics and Pediatrics Hospital (Hôpital Gynéco-Obstétrique et Pédiatrique de Yaoundé – HGOPY) and the University Hospital Center of Yaoundé (Centre Hospitalier Universitaire de Yaoundé – CHU).

== Sport ==
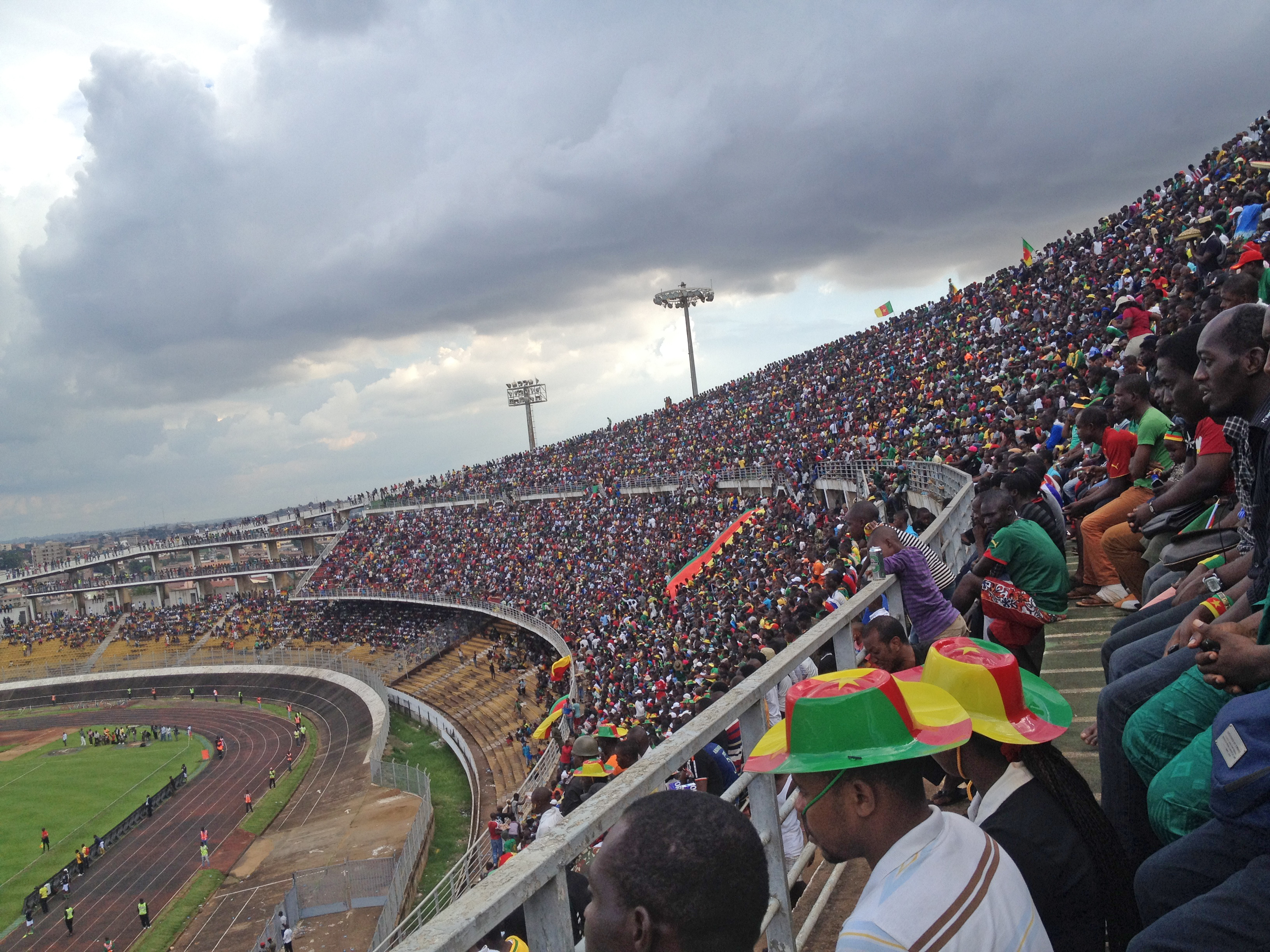
Ahmadou Ahidjo stadium during a match

The national football team plays some of its home matches in the Ahmadou Ahidjo stadium and the football clubs Canon Yaoundé, Impôts FC and Tonnerre Yaoundé are all based in the city. The Grand Prix Chantal Biya, a men's road bicycle racing event on the UCI Africa Tour, starts and finishes in Yaoundé.

Yaoundé is also the base for the National Institute of Youth and Sport (INJS); this school trains government workers who will be in charge of sport all across the country during their career.

Joel Embiid, centre for the Philadelphia 76ers, and Luc Mbah a Moute, who was a forward for the Los Angeles Clippers are from Yaoundé, as are Samuel Umtiti, a footballer for the national team of France and FC Barcelona, Breel Embolo, a footballer for AS Monaco FC and Vincent Aboubakar, a footballer for Porto.

== Notable people ==
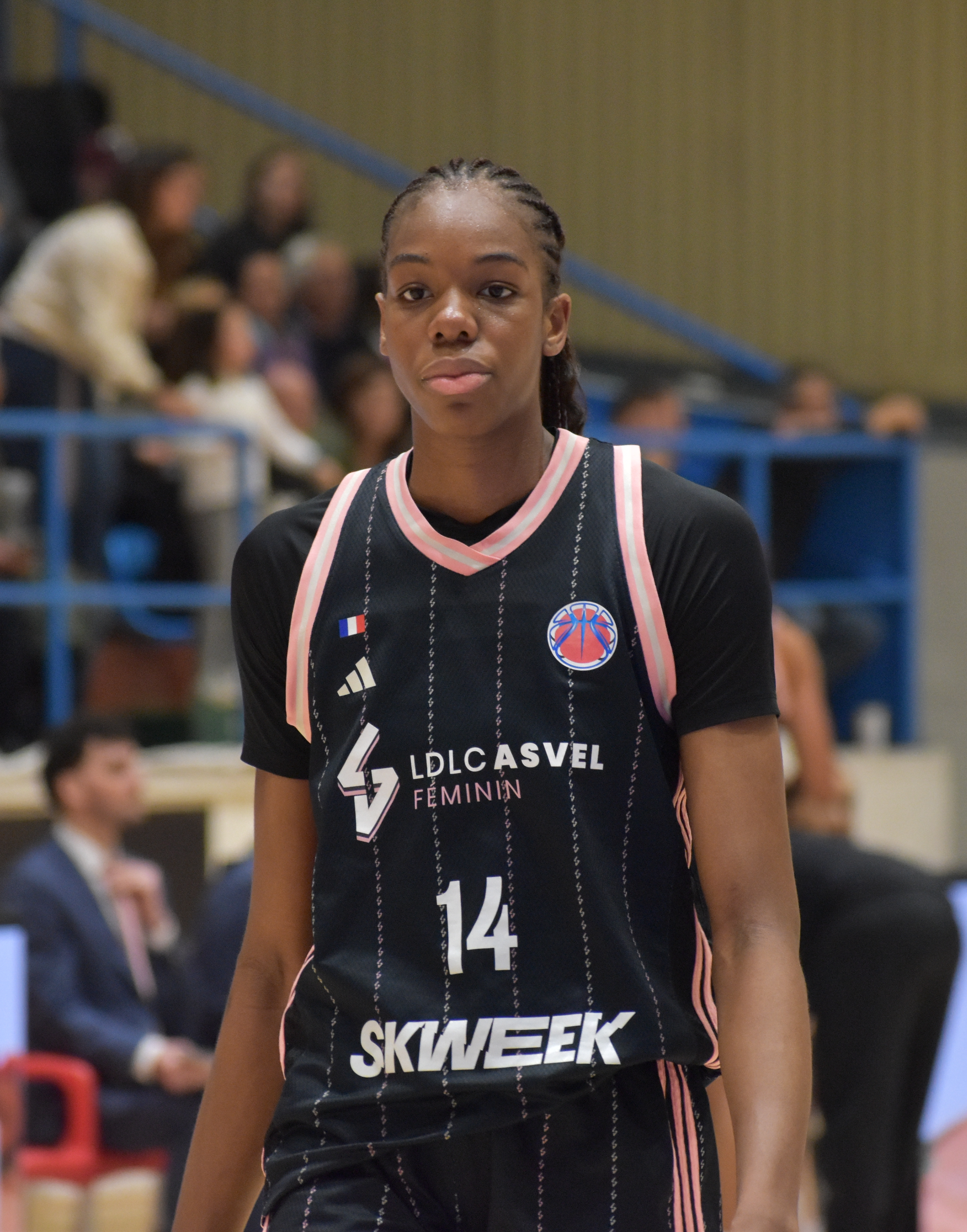
- Dominique Malonga
  Pierre Hervé Ateme Elanga, Cameroonian former professional footballer
- Jean-Pierre Bekolo, born in Yaoundé, film director
- Jeanne-Louise Djanga, poet, novelist and choreographer
- Arnold Ebiketie, outside linebacker for the Philadelphia Eagles
- Joel Embiid, professional basketball player, Philadelphia 76ers
- Breel Embolo, Swiss professional footballer
- Jeando Fuchs, born in Yaoundé, professional footballer for English club Peterborough United
- Dominique Malonga, born in Yaoundé, professional basketball player, Seattle Storm
- Luc Mbah a Moute, professional basketball player, NBA
- Charles Minlend, professional basketball player, 2003 Israeli Basketball Premier League MVP
- Francis Ngannou, UFC heavyweight champion
- Achille Njanke, Cameroonian footballer
- Ngando Pickett, Cameroonian football fan
- Youssoufa Moukoko, German professional footballer
- Balep Ba Ndoumbouk, Cameroonian-born Armenian footballer
- Samuel Umtiti, French professional footballer
