= University Teaching Hospital of Yaounde =

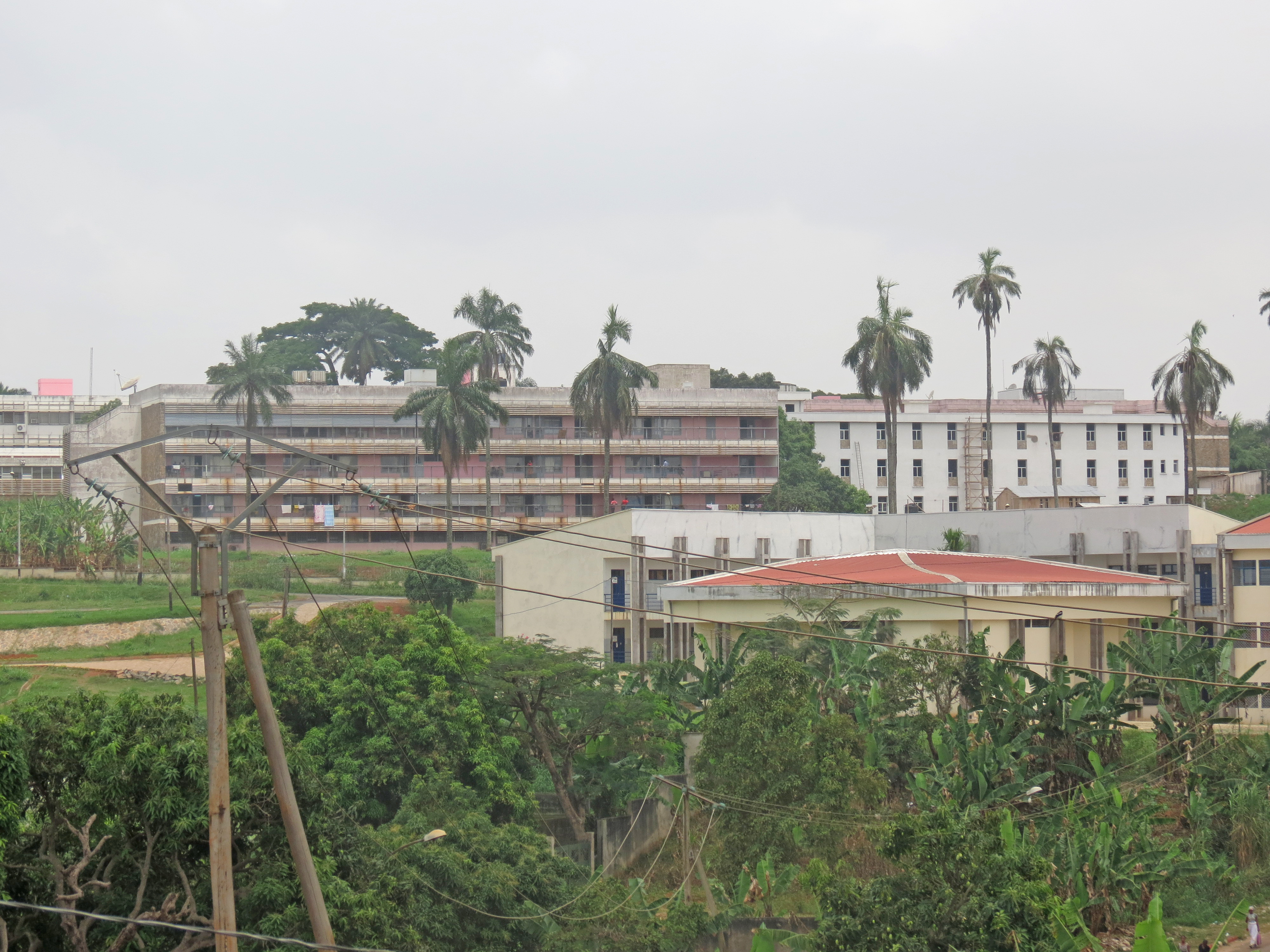

- Location within Cameroon

Geography
- Location: Yaoundé, Cameroon
- Coordinates: 3.862676°N 11.496645°E

Organisation
- Type: Teaching

History
- Founded: 1965

Links
- Website: kreativ.ca/chu/
- Lists: Hospitals in Cameroon

The University Teaching Hospital of Yaounde (French: Centre Hospitalier et Universitaire de Yaoundé - CHU) is one of the main hospitals in Yaoundé, Cameroon. It was founded by a Presidential decree on 28 October 1965. It has the goal of training general physicians who can diagnose and treat a wide range of diseases, and can provide health education.
