= Massangam =

Coordinates: 5°25′N 10°58′E

- Commune and town
- Interactive map of Massangam
- Country: Cameroon
- Time zone: UTC+1 (WAT)

Massangam is a town and commune in Cameroon.

== See also ==
- Communes of Cameroon
