= Nwa, Cameroon =

Nwa Koyanda
- Commune and town
- Location in Cameroon
- Coordinates: 6°30′45″N 11°4′35″E
- Country: Cameroon
- Region: North-West Region
- Department: Mantungia

Government
  - Type: District (3rd Order Government)

Area
  - Total: 640 sq mi (1,650 km^{2})

Population (2011)
  - Total: 121 642
- Time zone: UTC+1 (WAT)

Nwa is a town and commune in Cameroon.

== History ==
Nwa or Koyanda council was created by presidential decree number in 1963. At creation, it consisted of 43 villages (Adere, Lus, Bang, Manang, Mbat, jui, Koffa, Mballa, Mbah, Mbepji, Kom, Bom, Gom, Rom, Saam, Ngung, Ncha, Bitui, Ngung, Kwaja, Ntong, Faam, Kwak, Sih, Yang, Nwa, Nkot, Mbem, Mfe, Lih, Ngomkow, Ngom (Sabongari), Nyurong, Nwat, mbirikpa, Ngu, Nguri, Nwati, Ntem, Kurt -Gamfe, Jator- Gwembe, Kounchoum, Nking and Ntim) with a surface area of 1650km2.

The council was overseen by administrators; appointed by the government until 1992 with the introduction of democracy and decentralization; the Mayor and council are elected by the local populous, though election malpractice along with corruption are rampant. The Council is empowered to develop the district,providing services where needed. District Mayors include Kame Stephen (SDF party, 1992), Yakabong Paul (CPDM party, 2007) and Ngomfe David Loma Moloh (CPDM party, 2010–present).:

== Demographics ==
As of 2011, the District population stood at 121 642. Three ethnic tribes inhabit the Nwa District (municipality). Majority of whom originate from the Adamawa region and migrated westwards into the current area. This migration was caused by the advancement of the Fulani soldiers during the jihad. All three tribes are related to the Tikari tribe of that region.

The Mfumte Tribe inhabits the northern part of the district. They are known as the “Mfumte” due to their historical affiliation with palm trees (thus “people living under palms”). The tribe inhabits 14 villages.

The Yamba Tribe inhabits the centre of the district and makes up the majority of the district's population. According to one of the tribal leaders, Mfon Martin Kumbongsi (1960), the tribe was known as the Kaka tribe; which translates to “No-no” in the Nsungli/Limum language but later changed to the Yamba tribe. Based on a 1987 census figures, major Yamba villages (Nwa, Gom, Mbem, Mfe, Ngung, Rom and Yang) had more than a 1000 inhabitants, this concentration was due to the hilly terrain and the agriculture-based economy.

The Mbaw Tribe inhabits the southern part of the district. The tribe populates 13 villages, with the majority nucleated at Ntem, Ngu, Nwanti and Ngom. There are equally dispersed settlements especially where the main stay is agriculture. The settlement patterns are clustered along major roads such as the Ntaba-Sabongari-Koumchoum highway. The Mbaw Plain is a fertile land, owing its name to the Mbaw tribe, it fuels the agricultural sector of the district, employing the local populous.
