= Moulvoudaye =

Coordinates: 10.4059°N 14.8539°E

- Commune and town
- Interactive map of Moulvoudaye
- Country: Cameroon
- Time zone: UTC+1 (WAT)

Moulvoudaye is a town and commune in Cameroon.

== See also ==
- Communes of Cameroon
