= List of municipalities of Cameroon by population =

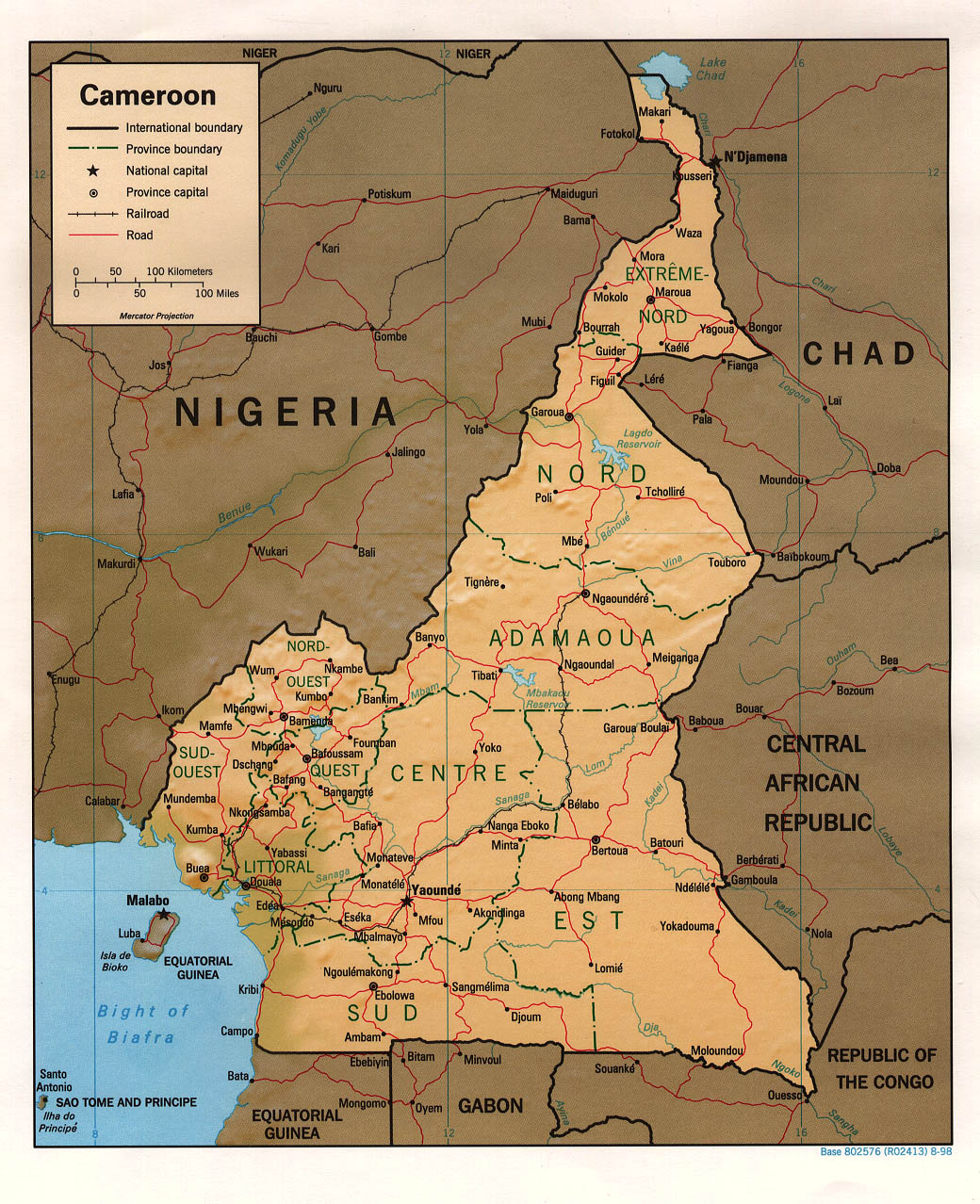
Major cities of Cameroon

This is the list of cities, towns, and villages in the country of Cameroon:

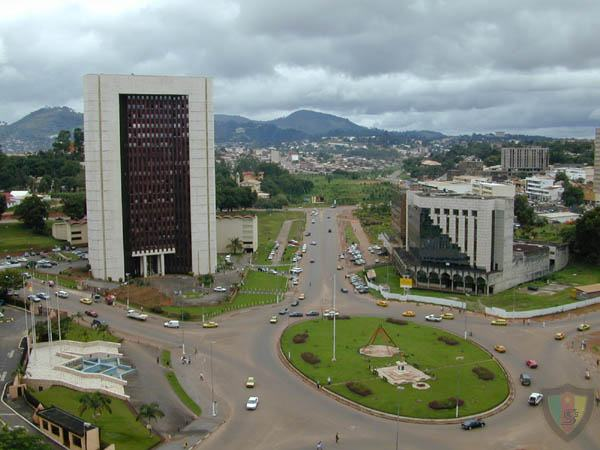
Yaoundé, capital and largest city of Cameroon

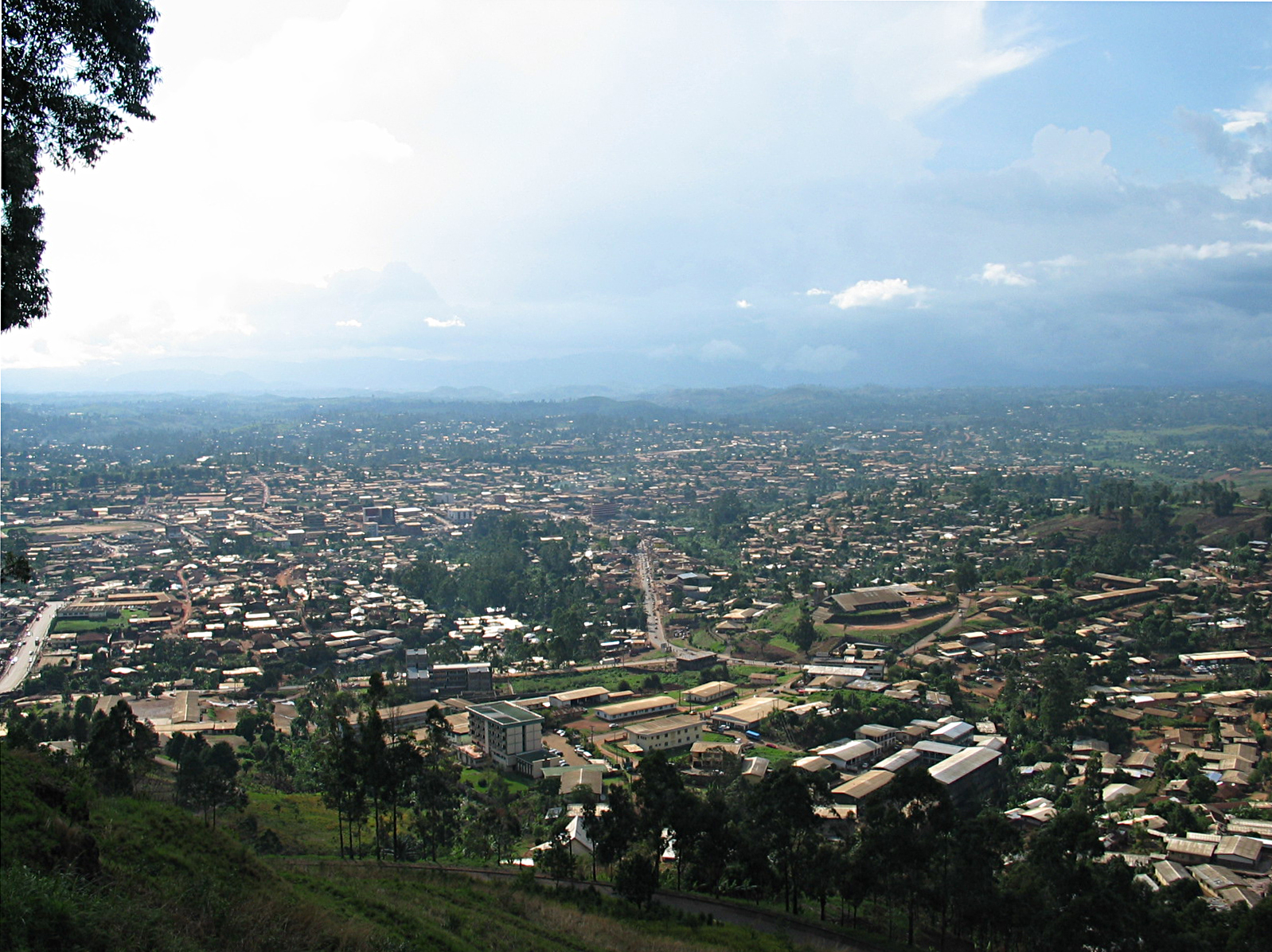
Bamenda

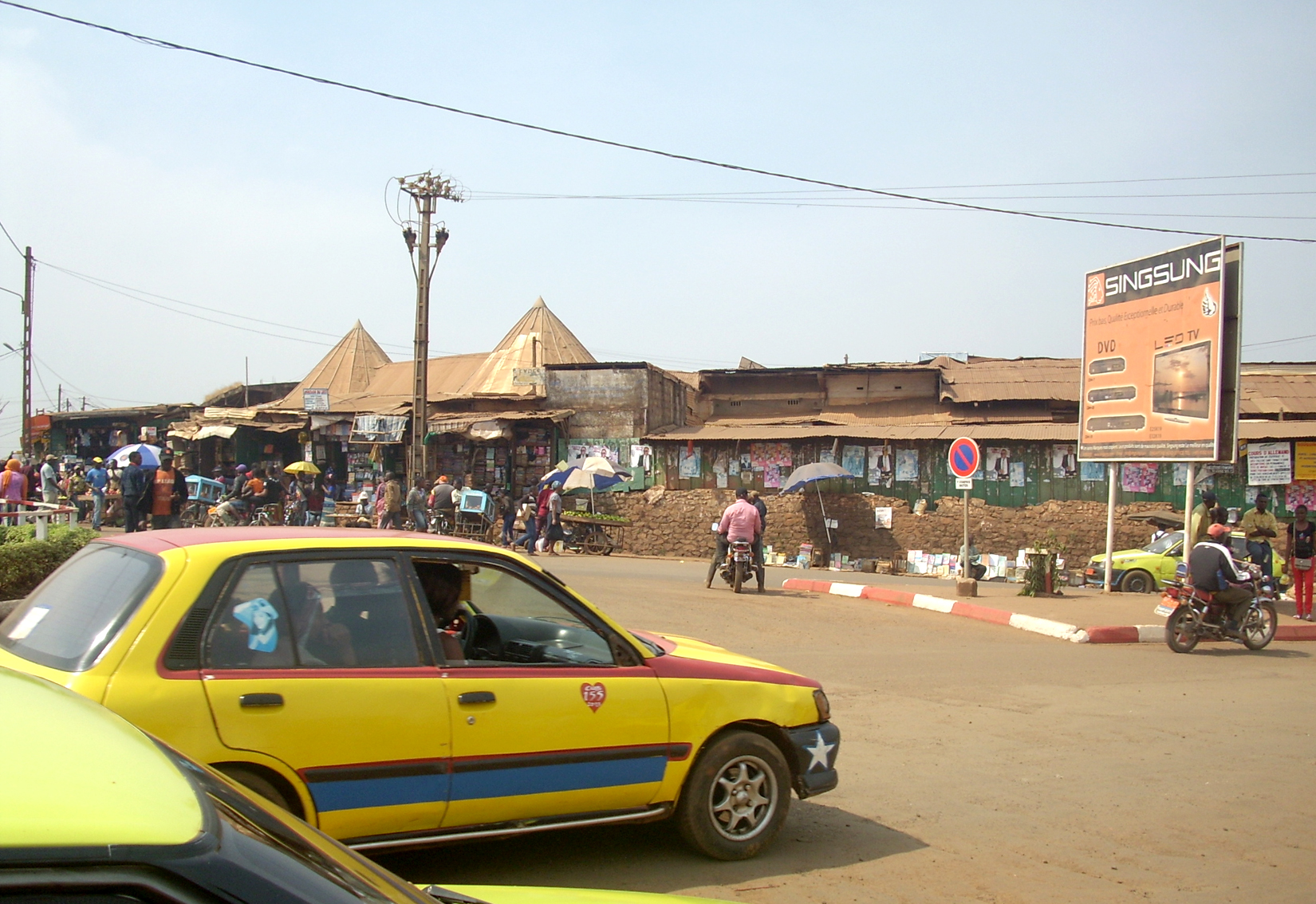
Bafoussam

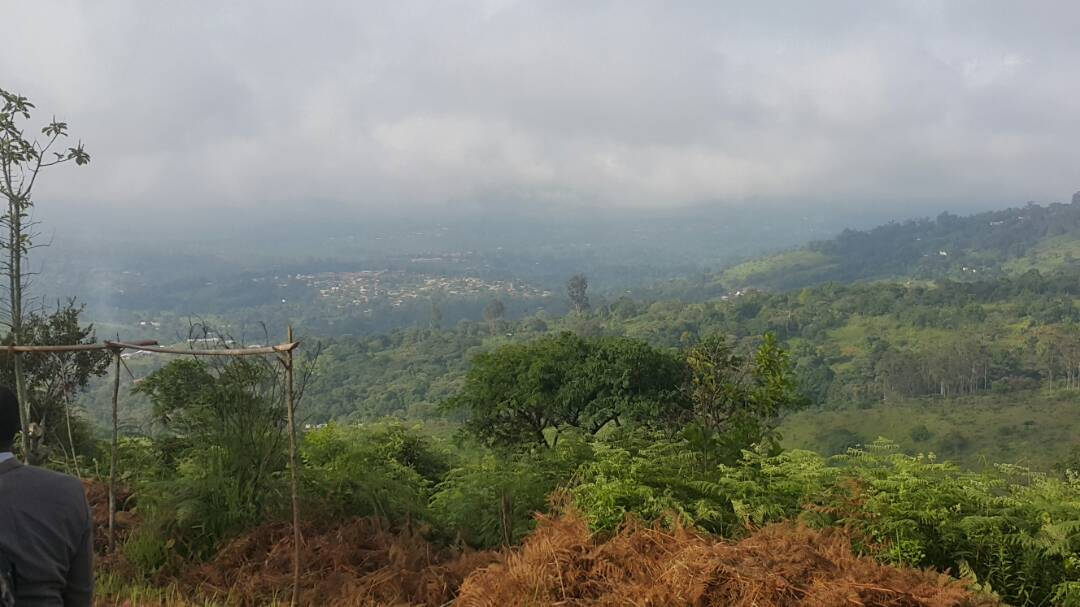
Bangangté

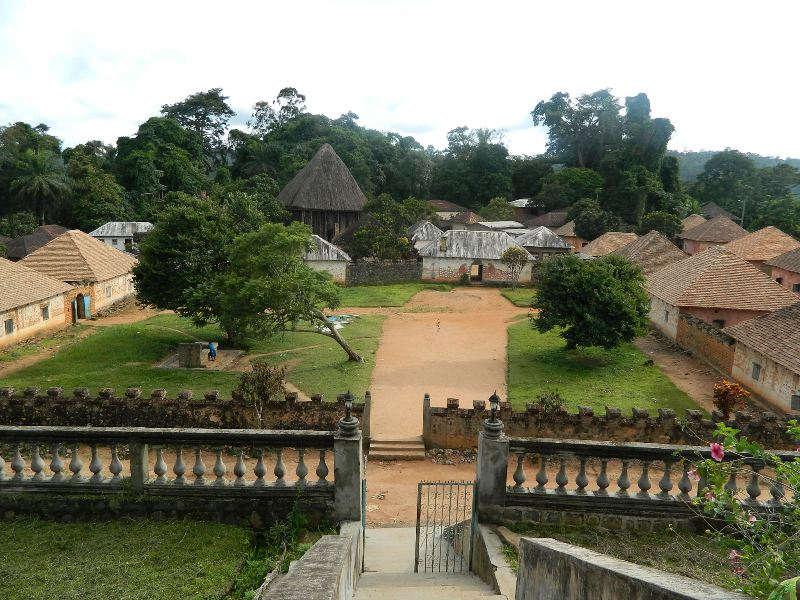
Bafut Palace

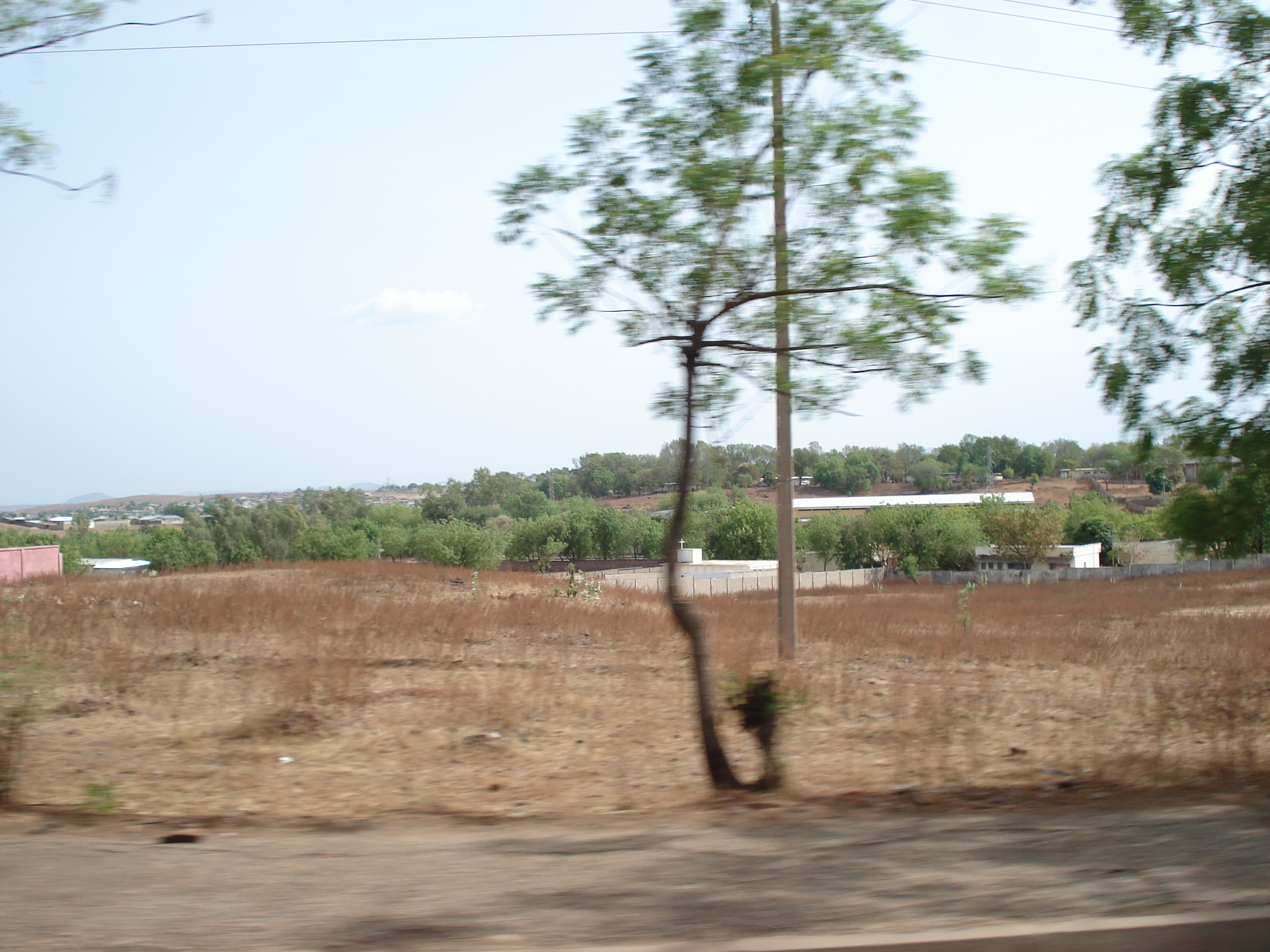
Garoua

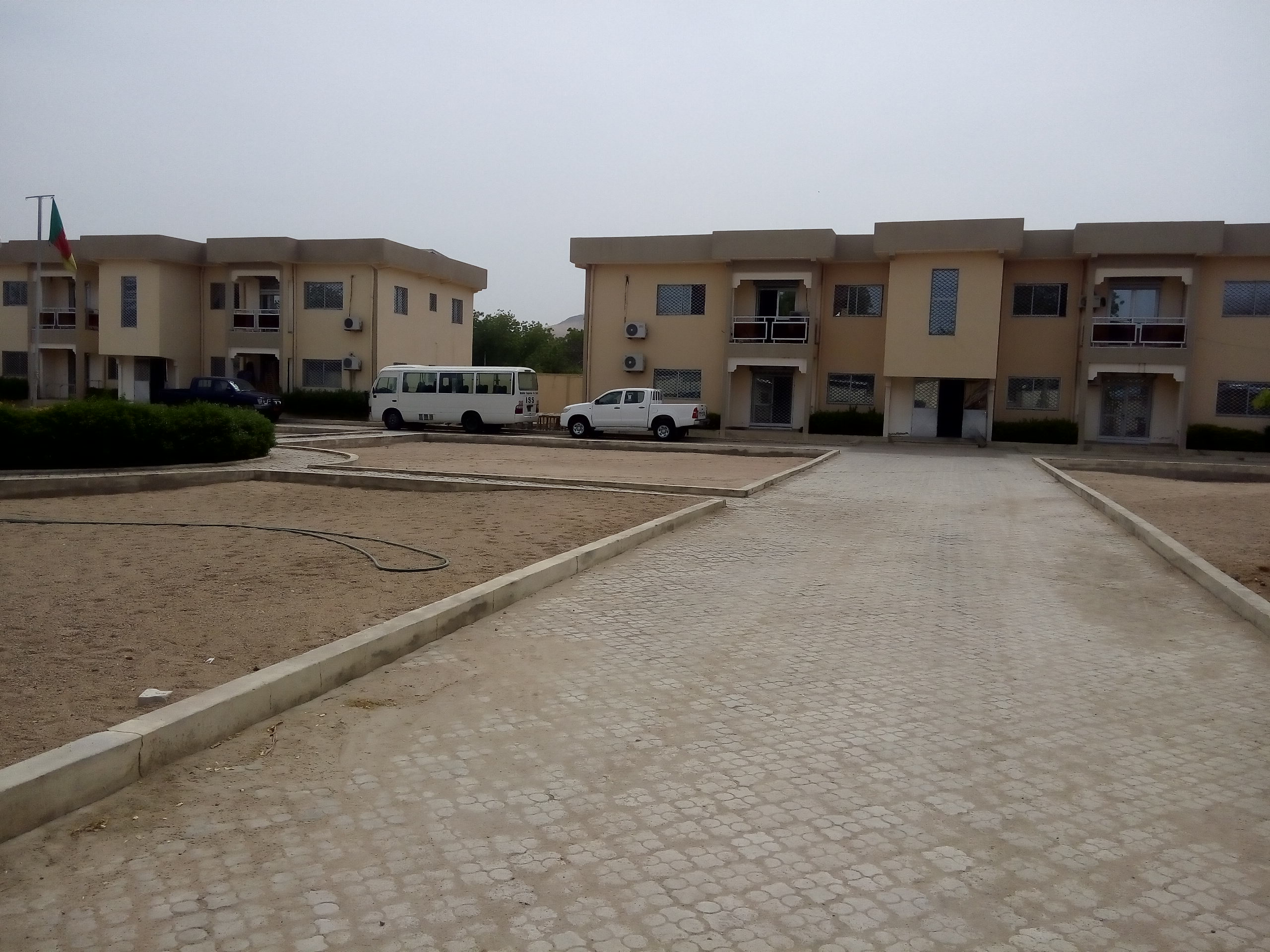
Maroua

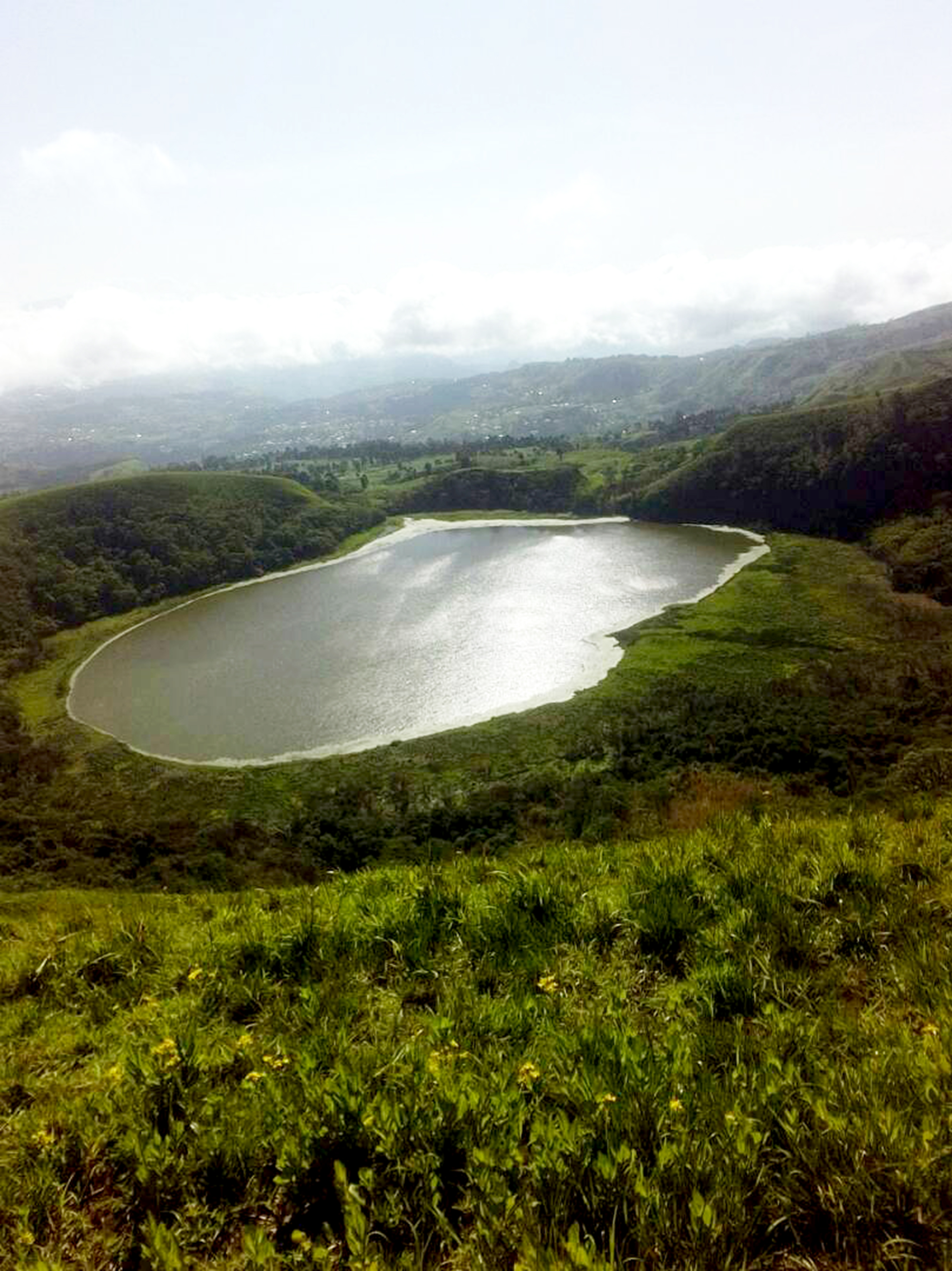
Babanki Tunguh The Lake Bambili

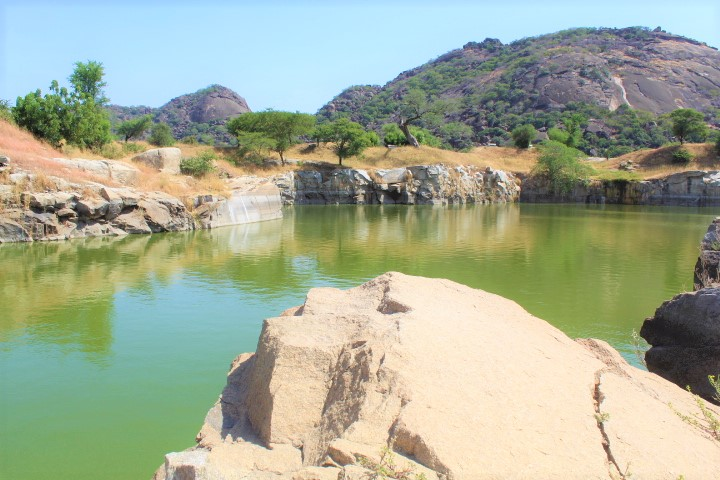
Kaélé, Boboyo Crocodile Lake

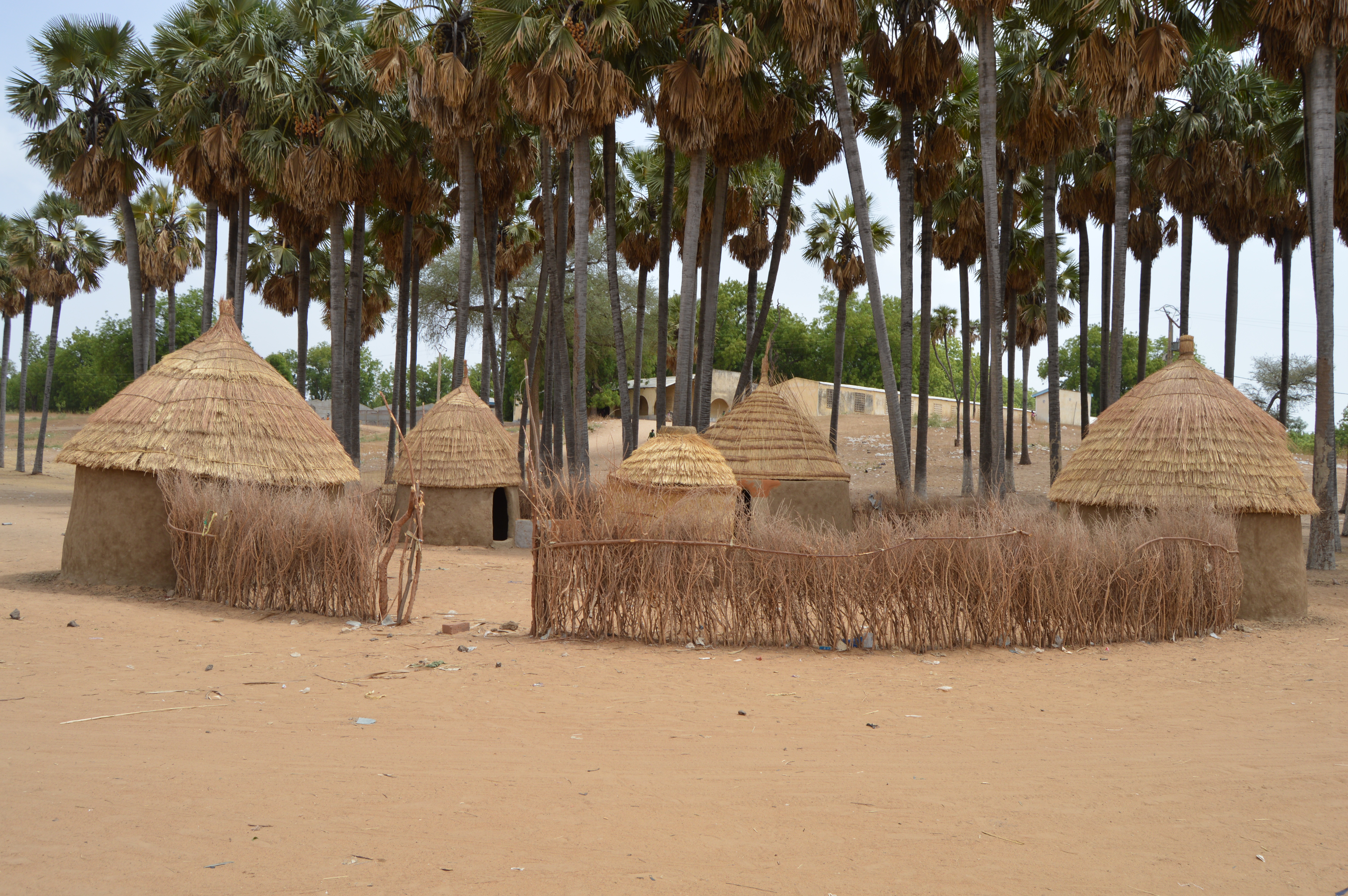
Yagoua

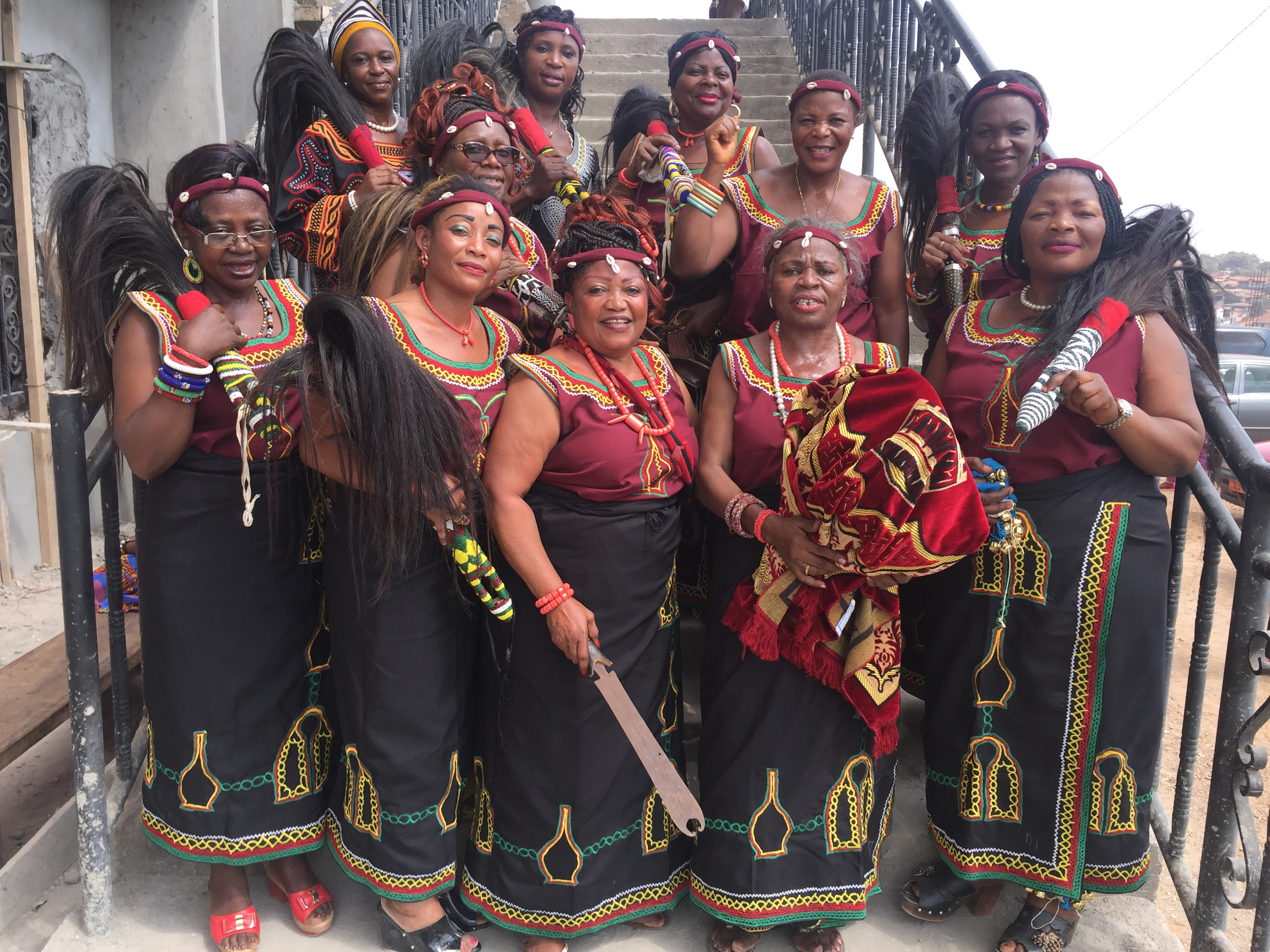
Wum culture

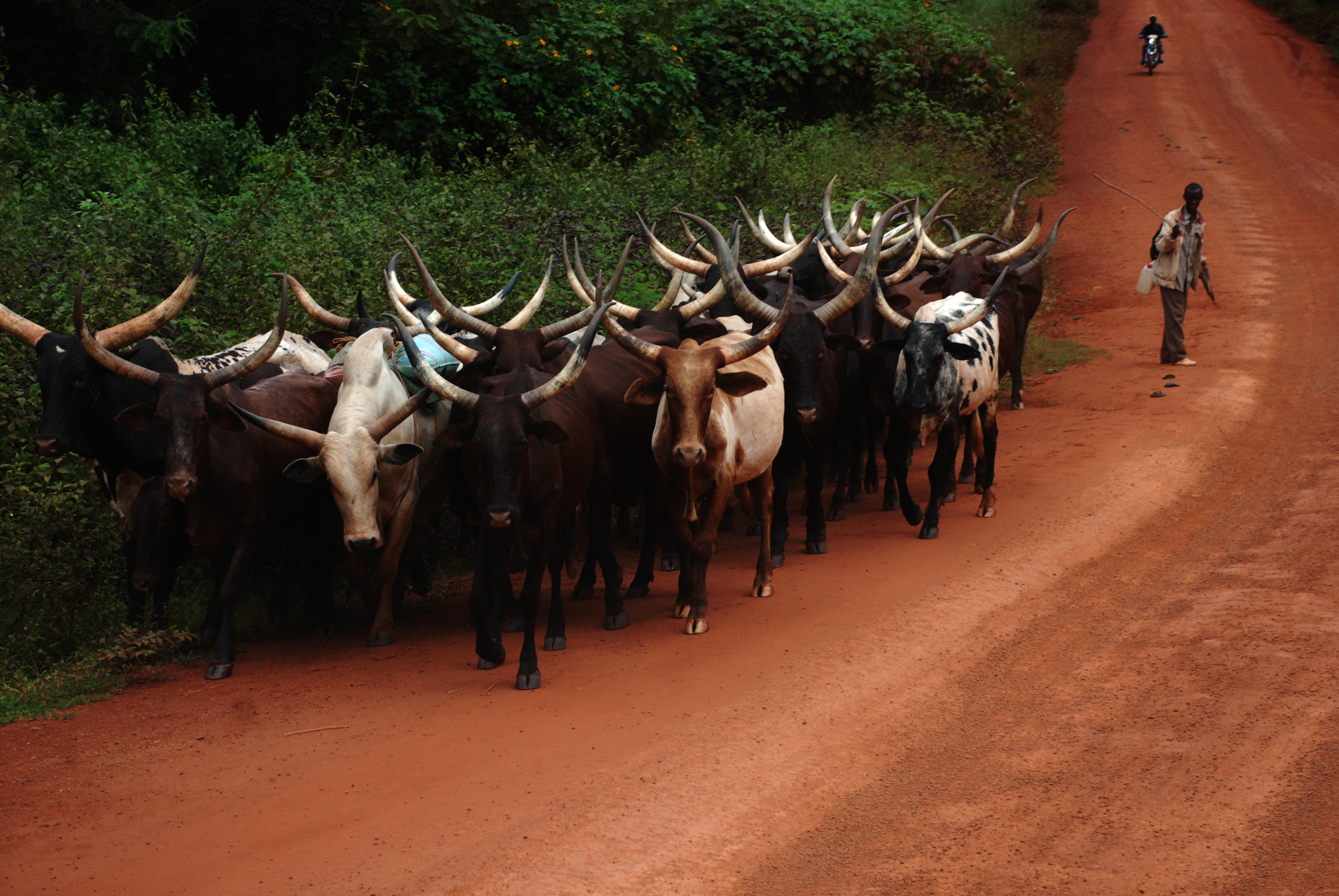
Yokadouma

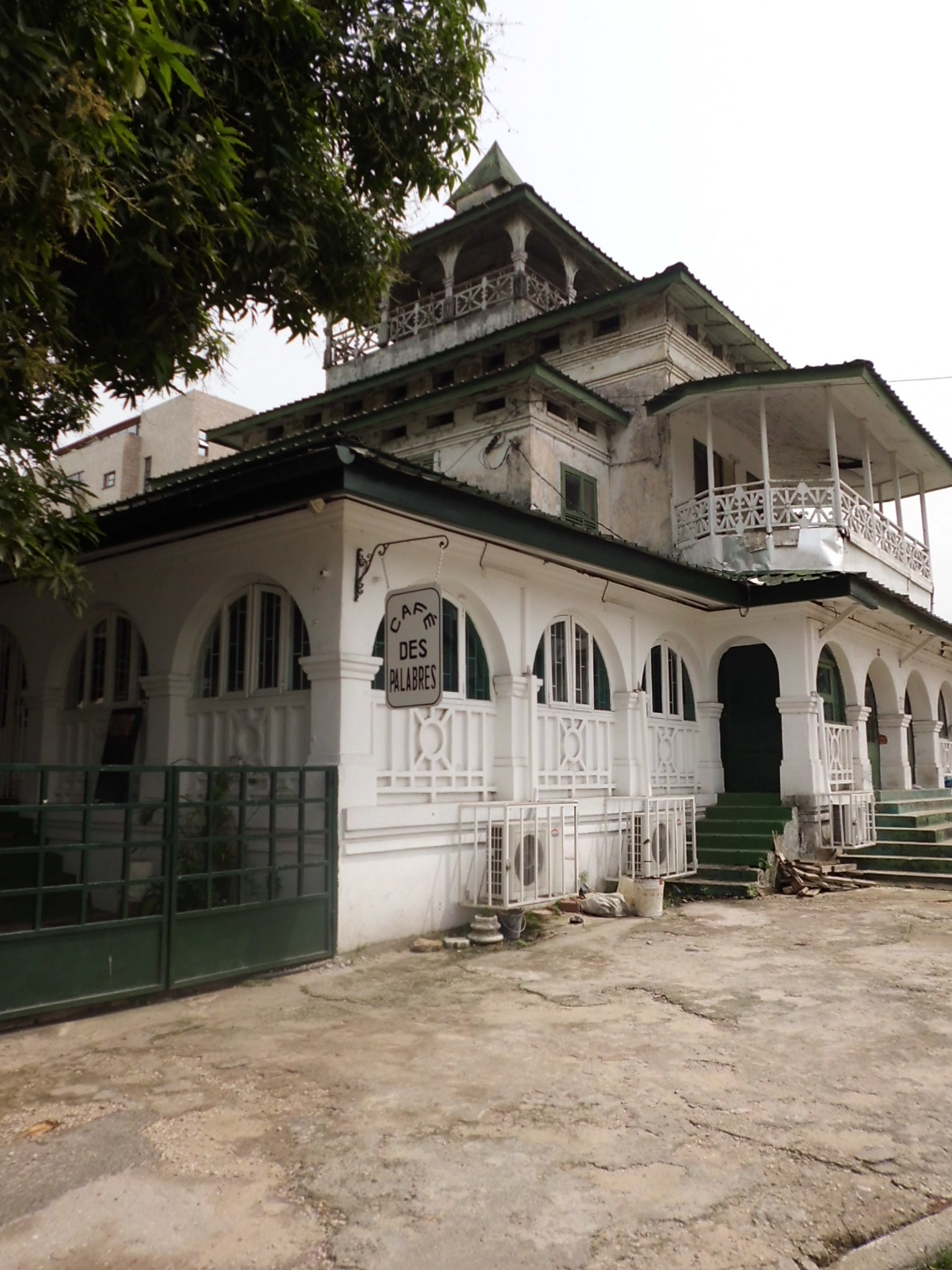
Douala, King Bell's Palace

Bold denotes a regional capital.

Municipalities in Cameroon
City	Region	Population (2005 Census)	Projected Population (2026)
Abong-Mbang	East	15,663	14,661
Akonolinga	Centre	19,282	17,181
Ambam	South	16,060	
Bafang	West	34,941	80,688
Bafia	Centre	47,471	69,270
**Bafoussam**	West	239,287	511,910
Bafut	Northwest	16,388	
Bali	Northwest	17,612	72,606
**Bamenda**	Northwest	269,530	657,875
Bamusso	Littoral		24,741
Bandjoun	West	20,354	
Bangangté	West	28,011	65,385
Banyo	Adamawa	30,730	40,798
Batouri	East	31,683	43,821
Bazou	West		13,058
Bélabo	East	15,616	22,553
**Bertoua**	East	88,462	218,111
Bétaré-Oya	East		11,866
Blangoua	Far North	17,442	
Bogo	Far North	21,046	16,952
**Buea**	Southwest	90,090	47,300
Dizangue	Littoral		19,243
**Douala**	Littoral	1,906,962	4,493,090
Dschang	West	63,838	96,112
**Ebolowa**	South	64,980	87,875
Edéa	Littoral	66,581	203,149
Ekondo-Titi	Southwest	15,370	
Eséka	Centre	17,904	22,221
Figuil	North	20,226	
Fontem	Southwest		42,689
Foumban	West	83,522	92,673
Foumbot	West	47,643	84,065
Fundong	Northwest		43,509
**Garoua**	North	235,996	402,371
Garoua-Boulaï	East	22,410	46,615
Guider	North	52,316	84,647
Kaélé	Far North	21,061	25,199
Kékem	West	17,333	
Kousséri	Far North	89,123	435,547
Kribi	South	59,928	55,224
Kumba	Southwest	144,268	144,413
Kumbo	Northwest	80,212	53,970
Lagdo	North	21,517	24,596
Limbé	Southwest	84,223	72,106
Lolodorf	South		22,252
Loum	Littoral	37,537	646,957
Maga	Far North	15,701	
Magba	West	19,829	
Mamfe	Southwest	13,046	19,472
Manjo	Littoral	26,758	37,661
**Maroua**	Far North	201,371	319,941
Mbalmayo	Centre	52,813	80,206
Mbandjock	Centre	18,771	26,947
Mbanga	Littoral	28,306	42,590
Mbouda	West	46,071	654,152
Meiganga	Adamawa	38,096	80,100
Melong	Littoral	49,180	37,086
Mindif	Far North		10,538
Mokolo	Far North	33,335	275,239
Mora	Far North	39,440	55,216
Mundemba	Southwest		11,912
Mutengene	Southwest		47,478
Muyuka	Southwest	28,046	31,384
Nkoteng	Centre	17,743	50,334
Nanga Eboko	Centre	18,282	29,909
Ndop	Northwest	25,740	
Ngaoundal	Adamawa	25,853	
**Ngaoundéré**	Adamawa	152,698	231,257
Njombé	Littoral	17,392	
Nkambé	Northwest	17,191	
Nkongsamba	Littoral	104,050	117,063
Obala	Centre	29,054	30,012
Oku	Northwest	28,491	
Penja	Littoral	13,698	28,406
Pitoa	North	21,546	11,454
Rey Bouba	North		11,454
Sangmélima	South	51,308	54,251
Soa	Centre	15,456	
Souza	Littoral	16,022	
Tcheboa	North	22,565	
Tcholliré	North		23,187
Tibati	Adamawa	22,869	35,589
Tiko	Southwest	60,796	55,914
Tombel	Southwest	15,632	
Tonga	West		16,036
Touboro	North	18,583	
Wum	Northwest	27,218	68,836
**Yaoundé**	Centre	1,817,524	5,027,120
Yagoua	Far North	37,867	80,235
Yokadouma	East	21,091	13,287

== Villages ==
- Bodo
- Goura, Centre Region
- Goura, Far North Region
- Ngoila
- Nkuv
- Mmuock Leteh
- Babungo
- Baba
- Babessi
- Bangolan
- Bamunka
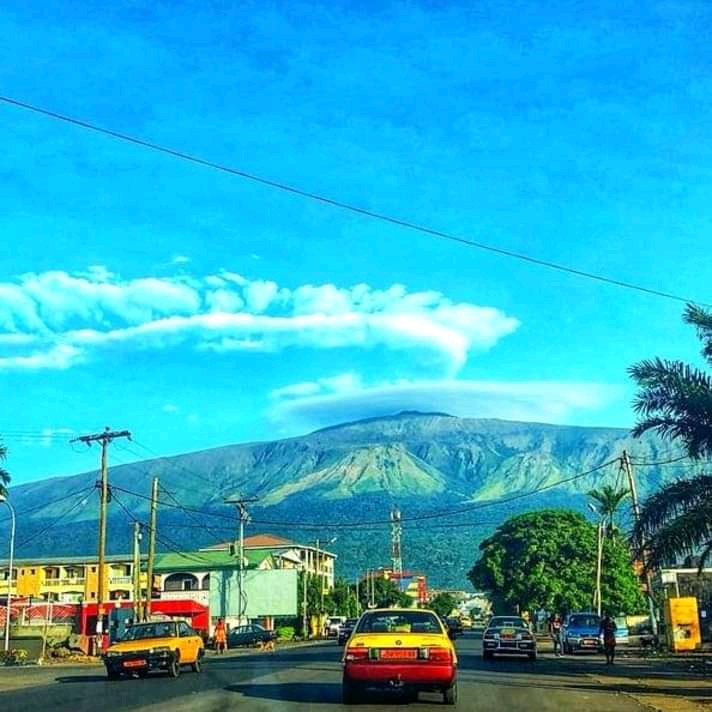
Buea

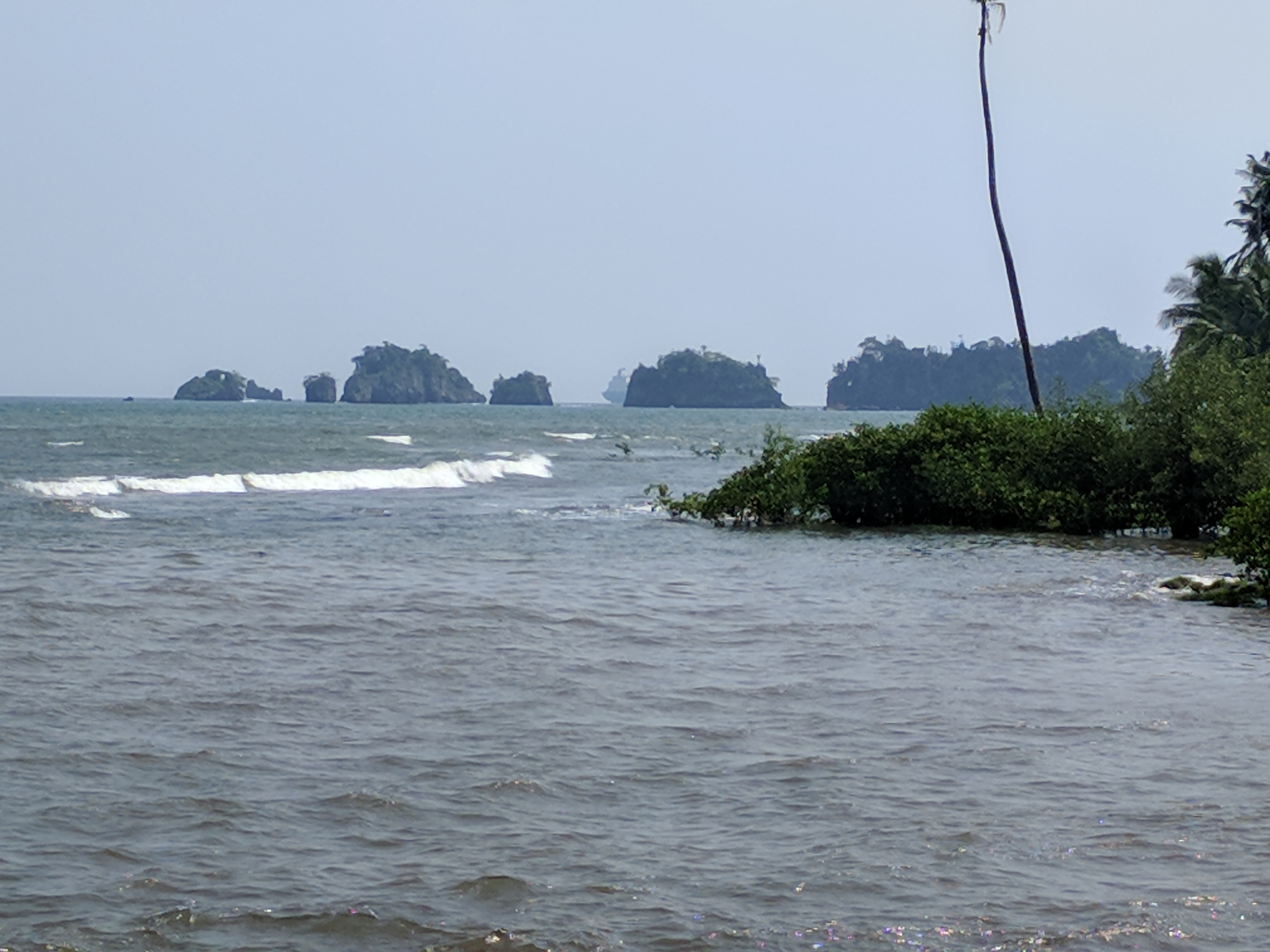
Atlantic Ocean, Limbe

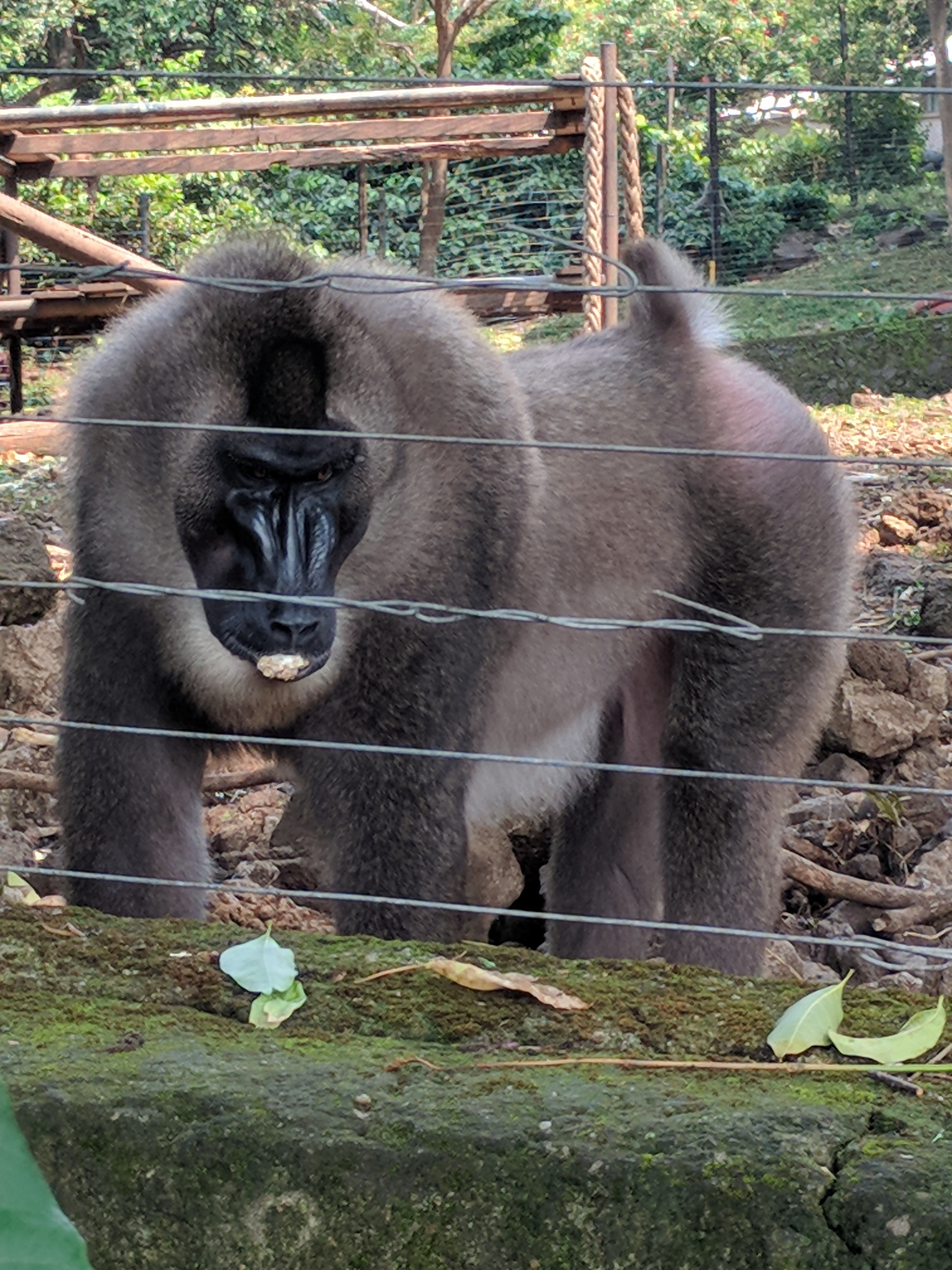
Drill, Limbe Wildlife Centre

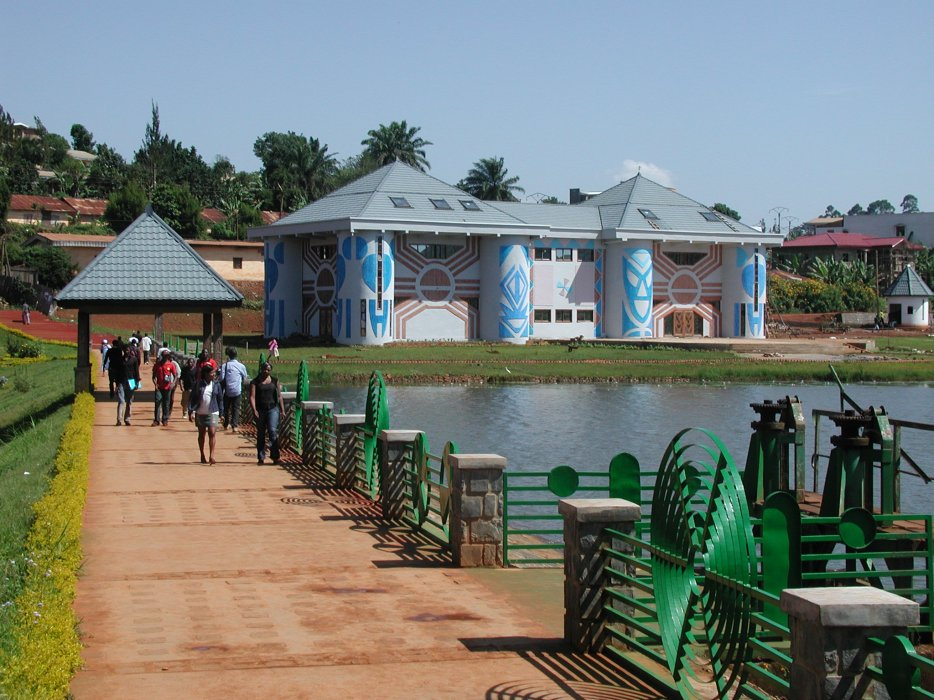
Dschang

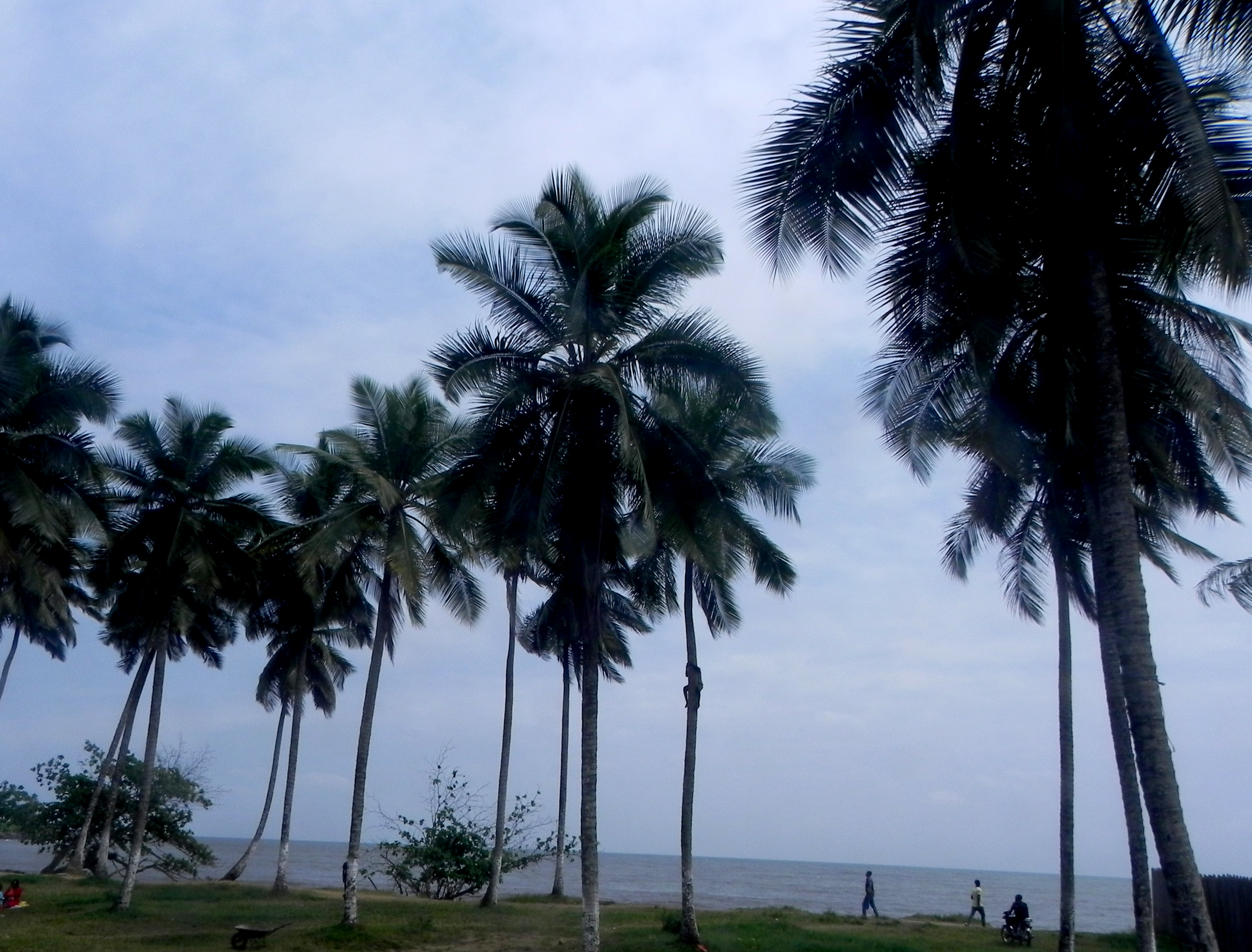
Kribi Beach

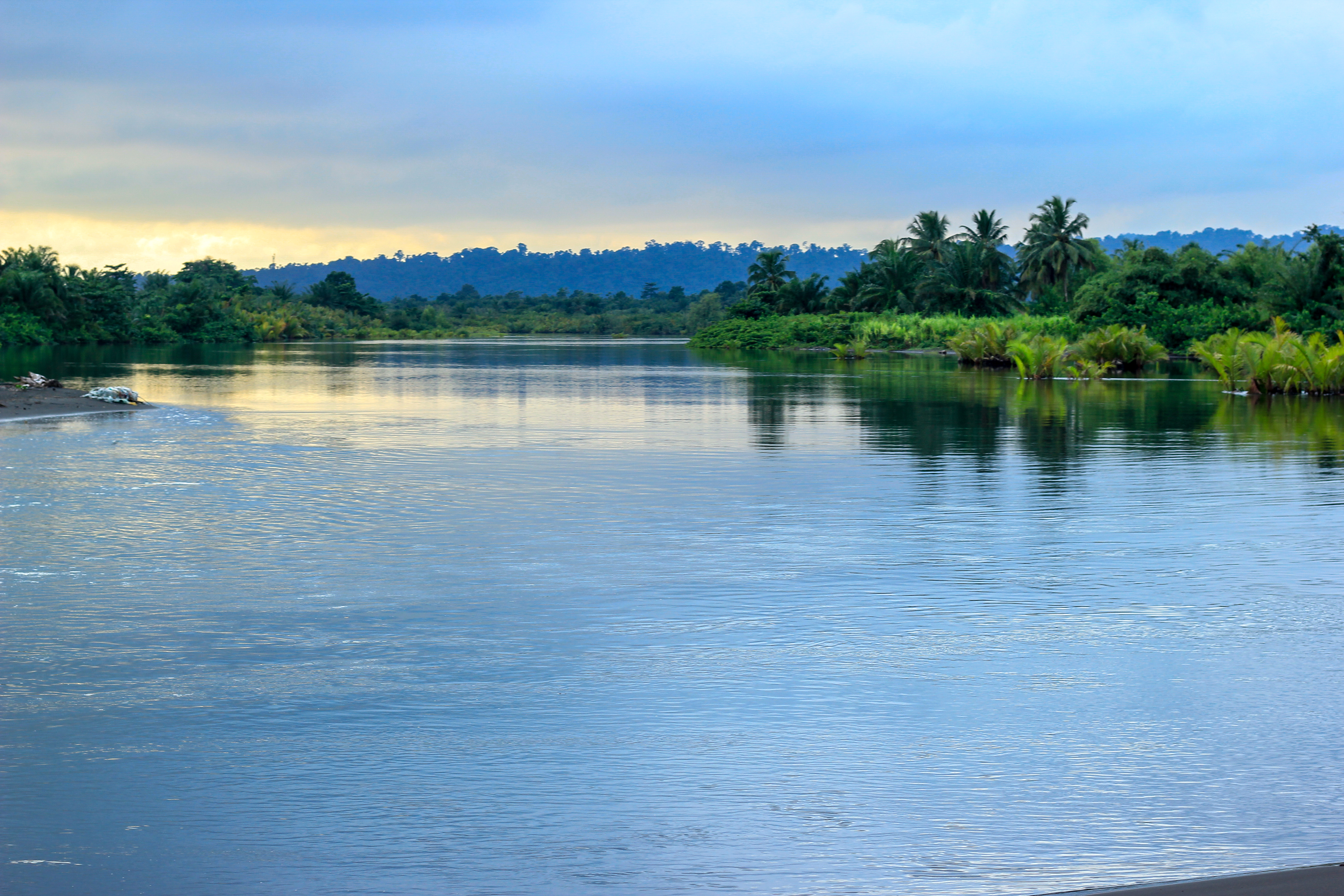
View of a creek in Idenau

== See also ==
- Communes of Cameroon
- Departments of Cameroon
- Regions of Cameroon
- Subdivisions of Cameroon
