= Mbong =

Coordinates: 4.6298°N 11.7068°E

- Human settlement
- Interactive map of Mbong
- Country: Cameroon
- Commune: Nsem
- Region: Centre
- Department: Haute-Sanaga

Population (2005)
  - Total: 337
- Time zone: UTC+1 (WAT)

Mbong is a settlement in the commune of Nsem, Haute-Sanaga department, Centre Region of Cameroon. As of 1963 census, Mbong had a population of 1963. But, as of 2005 census, the population is 337.

== See also ==
- Communes of Cameroon
