= Haute-Sanaga =

- Department
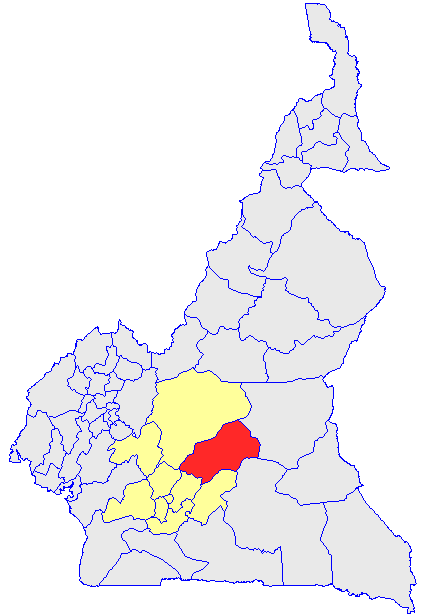
- Department location in Cameroon

- Location within Cameroon Location within Africa
- Country: Cameroon
- Province: Central Region
- Capital: Nanga-Eboko

Area
  - Total: 6,639 sq mi (17,196 km^{2})

Population (2001)
  - Total: 11,854
- Time zone: UTC+1 (WAT)

Haute-Sanaga is a department of Central Region in Cameroon. The department covers an area of 11,854 km^{2} and as of 2001 had a total population of 115,305. The capital of the department lies at Nanga-Eboko.

== Subdivisions ==
The department is divided administratively into seven communes and in turn into villages.

=== Communes ===
- Bibey
- Lembe-Yezoum
- Mbandjock
- Minta
- Nanga-Eboko
- Nkoteng
- Nsem
