= Blangoua =

- Commune and Town
- Location in Cameroon
- Coordinates: 12°46′03″N 14°34′33″E
- Country: Cameroon
- Region: Far North
- Department: Logone-et-Chari
- Elevation: 267 m (876 ft)

Population (2012)
  - Total: 22,242
- Time zone: UTC+01:00 (WAT)

Blangoua is a town and commune in Cameroon. It is located on the Chari River, which runs throughout some of Cameroon. It is the northernmost settlement of the country.

== See also ==
- Communes of Cameroon
