= Nkoteng =

- Commune and town
- Location in Cameroon
- Coordinates: 4°31′N 12°02′E
- Country: Cameroon
- Region: Centre
- Department: Haute-Sanaga
- Elevation: 536 m (1,759 ft)

Population (2012)
  - Total: 20,100
- Time zone: UTC+1 (WAT)

Nkoteng is a town and commune in Cameroon.

== See also ==
- Communes of Cameroon
