= Lake Ossa =

Lake in Littoral Province of Cameroon

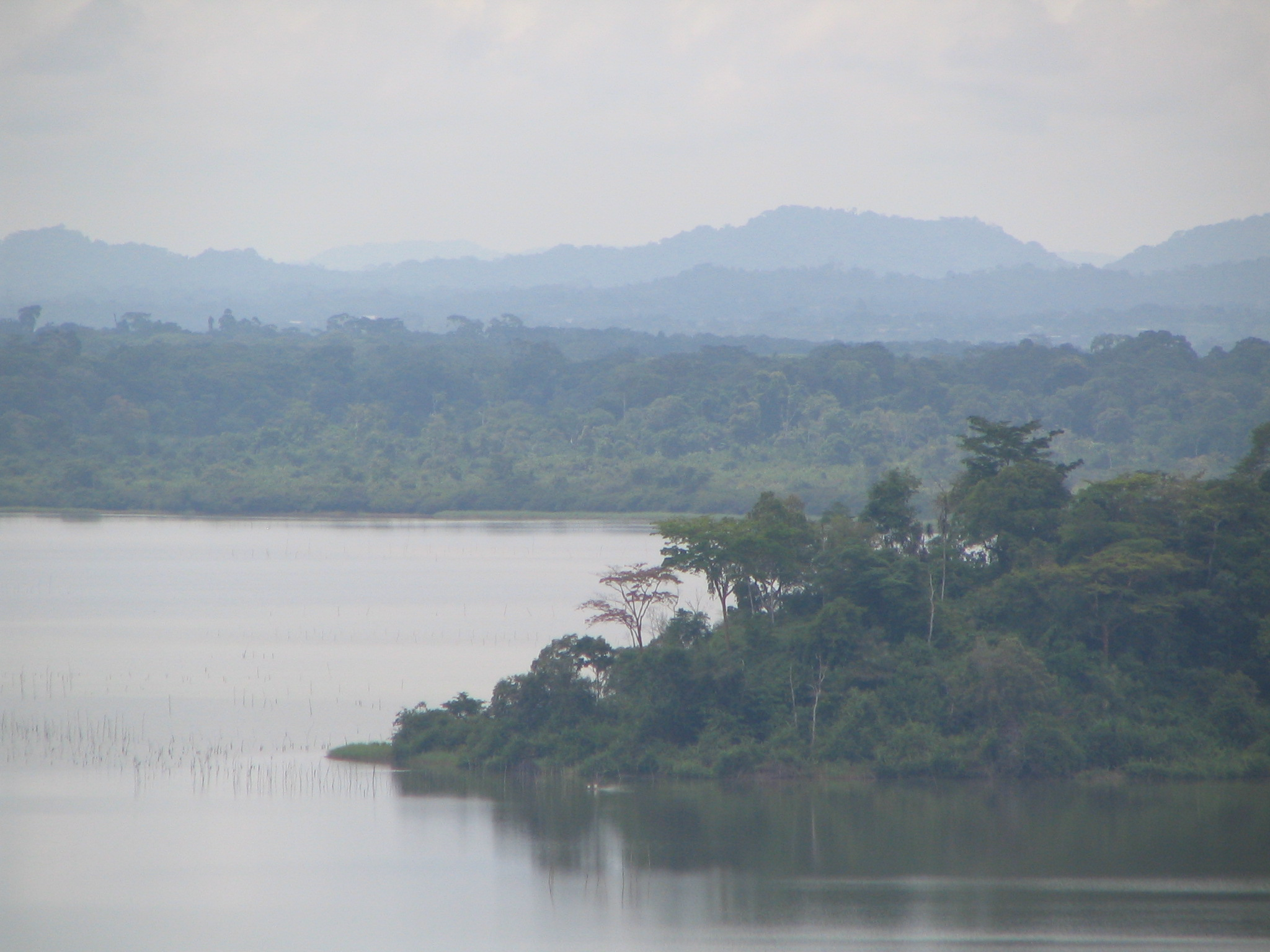

- Location within Cameroon Location within Africa
- Location: Littoral Province
- Coordinates: 3.796663°N 10.024779°E
- Catchment area: Sanaga River
- Basin countries: Cameroon
- Max. length: 7 km (4.3 mi)
- Surface area: 39.27 km^{2} (15.16 sq mi)

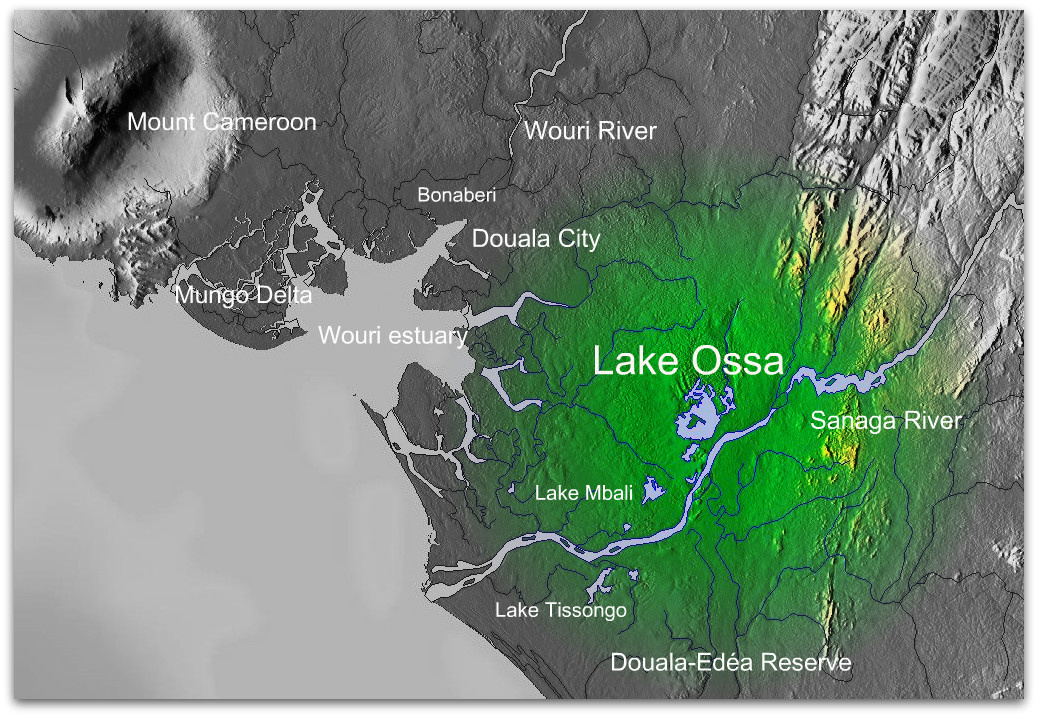
Lake Ossa

Lake Ossa is a lake that lies west of Edéa in the Littoral Province of Cameroon. Lake Ossa, together with the smaller lakes Mevia to the northeast and Mwembe to the southwest, form the Lake Ossa complex. The lake complex covers an area of 39.27 km^{2}, and is Cameroon's largest natural lake.

== Geography ==
The lakes have a dissected shape, with numerous inlets and islands. Lake Ossa is 7 km (4.3 mi) wide at its widest point. The lakes are in the lower basin of the Sanaga River, and are linked to the river by a narrow channel 3 km (1.9 mi) in length. The lake complex was created by tectonic movements of the Earth's crust. The lake shores are often steep, sloping 70 to 80 meters above the surface of the lake.

== Ecology ==
The lake complex is home to the African manatee (Trichechus senegalensis), dwarf crocodile (Osteolaemus tetraspis), African softshell turtle (Trionyx triunguis). The lakes have 36 species of fish, in 21 families – eight species of cichlids, six species of Mormyridae, three of Alestidae, and two of Claroteidae.

The invasive aquatic fern Salvinia molesta was first reported in Lake Ossa in 2016. By the summer of 2021, it covered approximately 49% of the lake's surface, forming dense floating mats that can restrict sunlight penetration and alter water quality. In 2021, a biological control programme was initiated through the release of the salvinia weevil (Cyrtobagous salviniae). Satellite monitoring and field surveys documented an approximately 80% reduction in salvinia coverage within three years of the weevil's release. By late 2023, the reduction in the infestation had helped restore fishing and transportation opportunities and coincided with the return of African manatees to the lake.

Lake Ossa's shores are forested with lowland rain forest, part of the Cross-Sanaga-Bioko coastal forests ecoregion. Common trees include azobe (Lophira alata), ndo’o (Irvingia gabonensis), African corkwood (Musanga cecropioides), afara (Terminalia superba) and iroko (Milicia excelsa). There is a freshwater swamp forest at the southeastern end of the lake around the outflow channel, with the trees Pandanus, Raphia, Mitragyna, and Uapaca.

== People and economy ==
The largest town is Beach, southeast of the lake. There are several small villages around the lake shore.

The lake is an important source of fish, and supports a community of small-scale fish catchers and fish sellers who supply fish to Dizanguè and Edéa. Lake Ossa is a popular site for recreational fishing, boating, and watersports.

== Lake Ossa Faunal Reserve ==
Lake Ossa Faunal Reserve (Réserve de Faune du Lac Ossa) covers an area of 45.39 km^{2}. The reserve was created on 2 December 1948 by Order No. 538 of the colonial government. The reserve's boundaries were clarified by Order No. 14-2 of 6 July 1974. The reserve is in IUCN category IV.
