= Nanga Eboko =

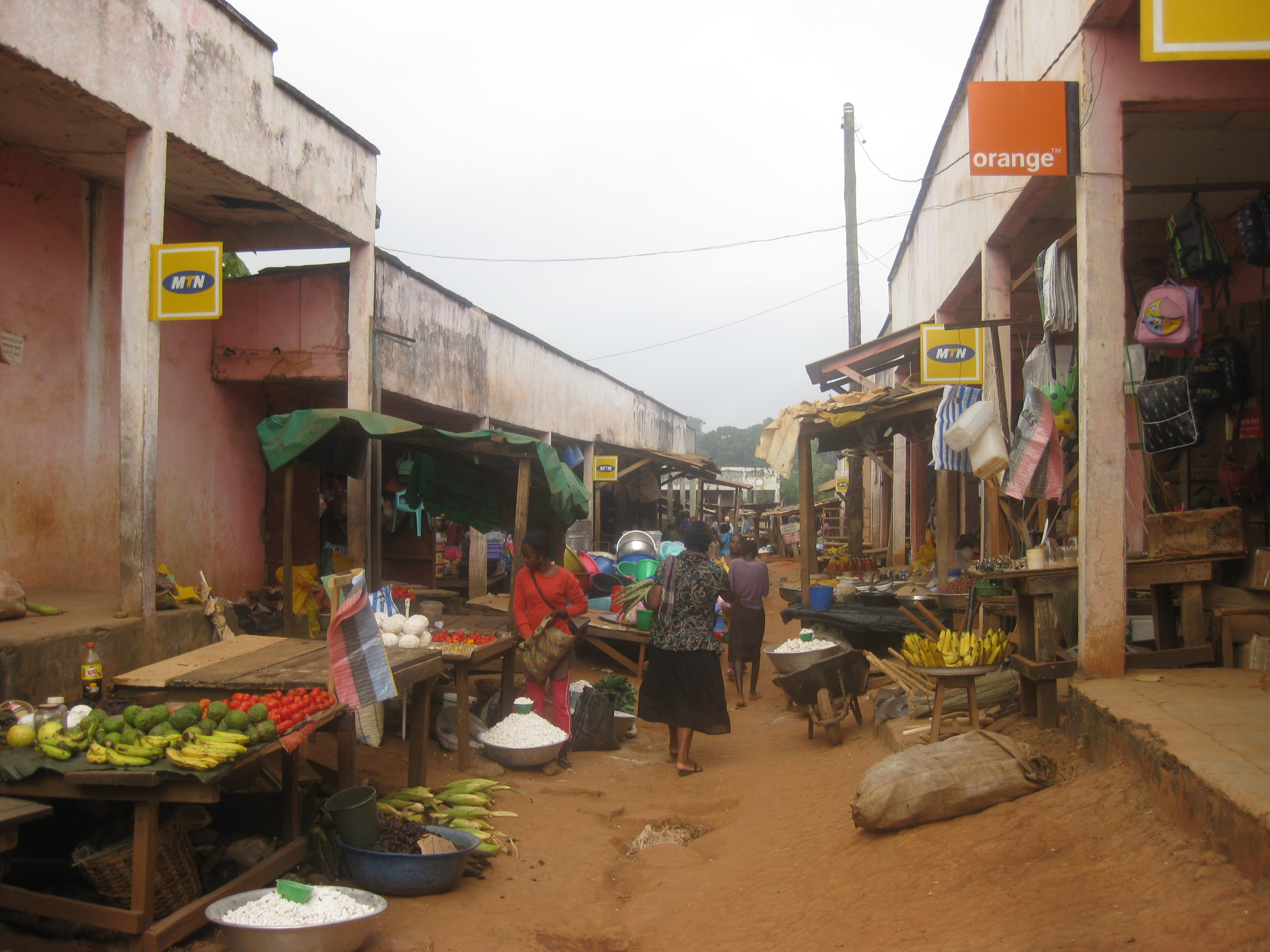
- The town's market

- Location in Cameroon
- Coordinates: 4°40′15″N 12°22′23″E
- Country: Cameroon
- Province: Centre
- Department: Haute-Sanaga

Area
  - Total: 7,000 km^{2} (2,700 sq mi)
- Elevation: 631 m (2,070 ft)

Population
  - Total: 29,814
  - Density: 4.3/km^{2} (11/sq mi)
- Climate: Aw

Nanga Eboko (Nanga-Eboko) is a town and municipality, the capital of the Haute-Sanaga (Upper Sanaga) department in the Centre Province of Cameroon. It lies on the Sanaga River and counts a population of 29,814, of which 18,282 are in the town.

== Geography ==
The town, located in the middle of Cameroon, lies between Yaoundé (172 km northeast), the national capital, and Bertoua (173 km east).

The municipality includes the town of Nanga Eboko itself and several villages:

- Abam
- Berkong
- Bibassa
- Biboa
- Bifoulé
- Bikaga
- Bikang
- Bissaga
- Bitam
- Biwong
- Bogba
- Boundjou
- Déa
- Dingbekoua
- Eboulé
- Efoulane II
- Ekanga
- Ekok
- Ekondong
- Emtsé
- Essamesso
- Etog-Nang
- Ka'a
- Kom
- Lembé Badja
- Mangaé
- Mbenda
- Mbiam
- Mbomendjock
- Mebolé
- Mekak
- Mekomo
- Memia
- Mendoumbé
- Menga'a
- Mengoa
- Mengondé
- Mengué
- Messa'a
- Messegué
- Messibigui
- Mevounga
- Mewomé
- Meyang
- Meyosso
- Mezassa
- Mfomalène
- Mgboum
- Mimbang
- Mimbelé
- Mpandang
- Mpomtené
- Mvomzock
- Nangmana
- Ndandouck
- Ndemba
- Nding
- Ndjassi
- Ndjimekong
- Ndjombé
- Ngamba
- Ngamba-Ndel
- Ngoakomba
- Ngoulmekong
- Nkoambang
- Nkolmveng
- Nkondom
- Nya Yessé
- Okassang
- Okolat
- Ouassa-Bamvelé
- Sandja
- Sanga
- Sassé
- Zengoaga

== Transport ==
Nanga Eboko has a railway station on the Camrail system, on the branch linking the national capital Yaoundé with Ngaoundéré. The station is located in the northern suburb of Nsimeyong. The town has also a local unpaved airfield, and is crossed by the national highway N1.

== Popular culture ==
Eddie Murphy's character in Trading Places dons a thinly veiled disguise as an exchange student from Cameroon named "Nanga Eboko".

== Notable people ==
- Asseng Protais, playwright
- Bio Paulin, footballer
- Loïc Mbe Soh, footballer
- Mohammadou Al Hadji, footballer

== Gallery ==
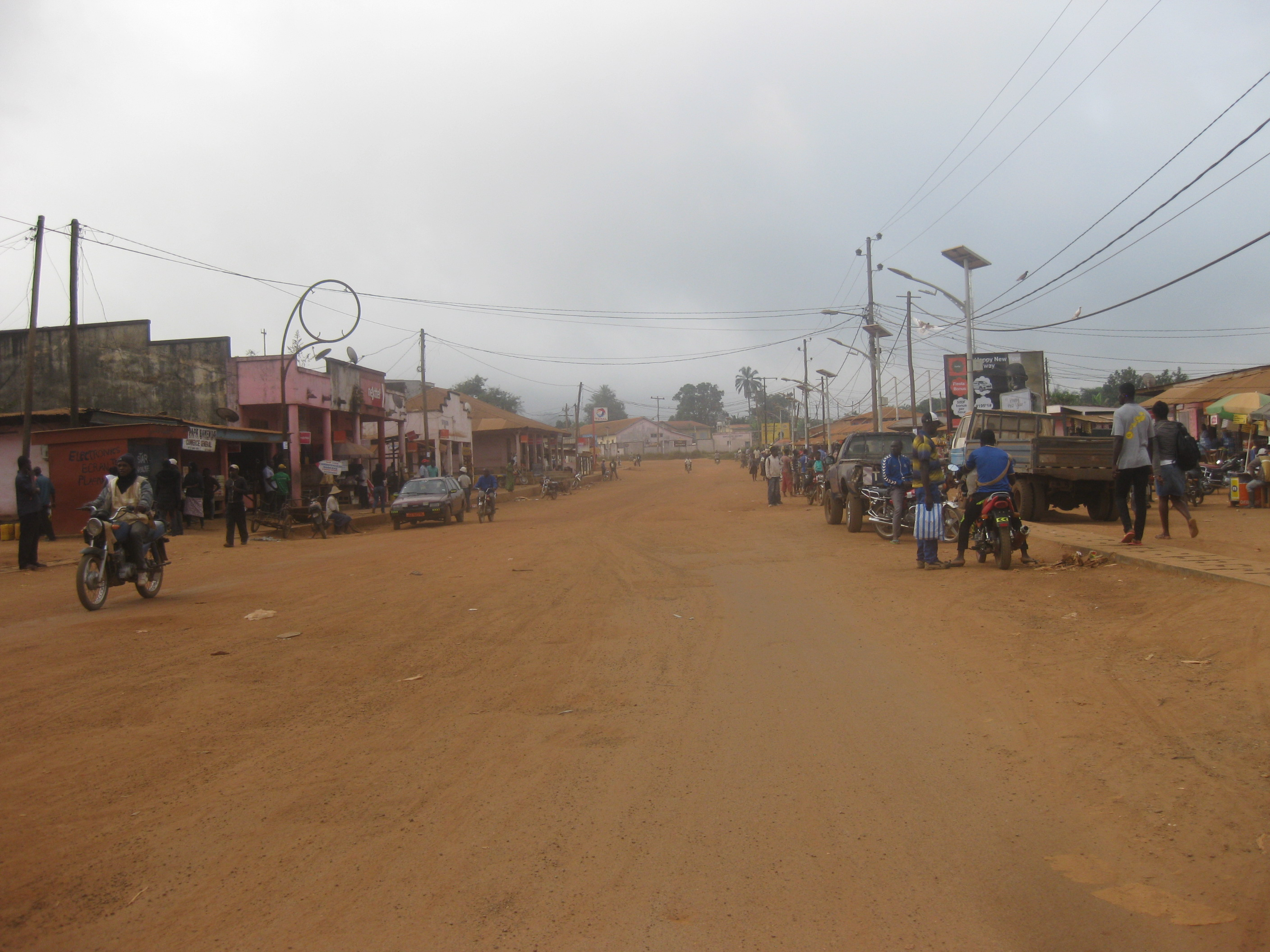
Town's centre

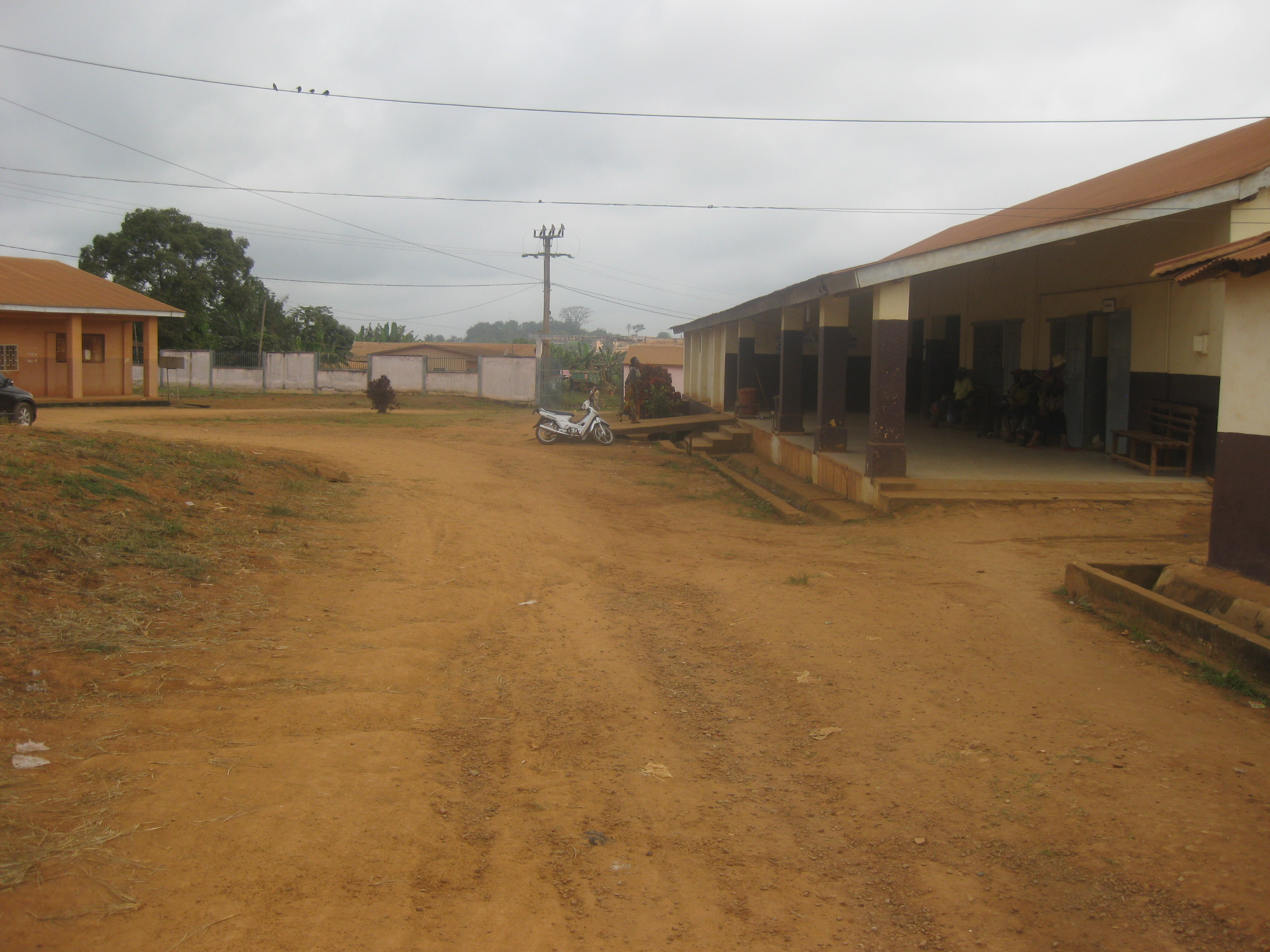
Town's hospital

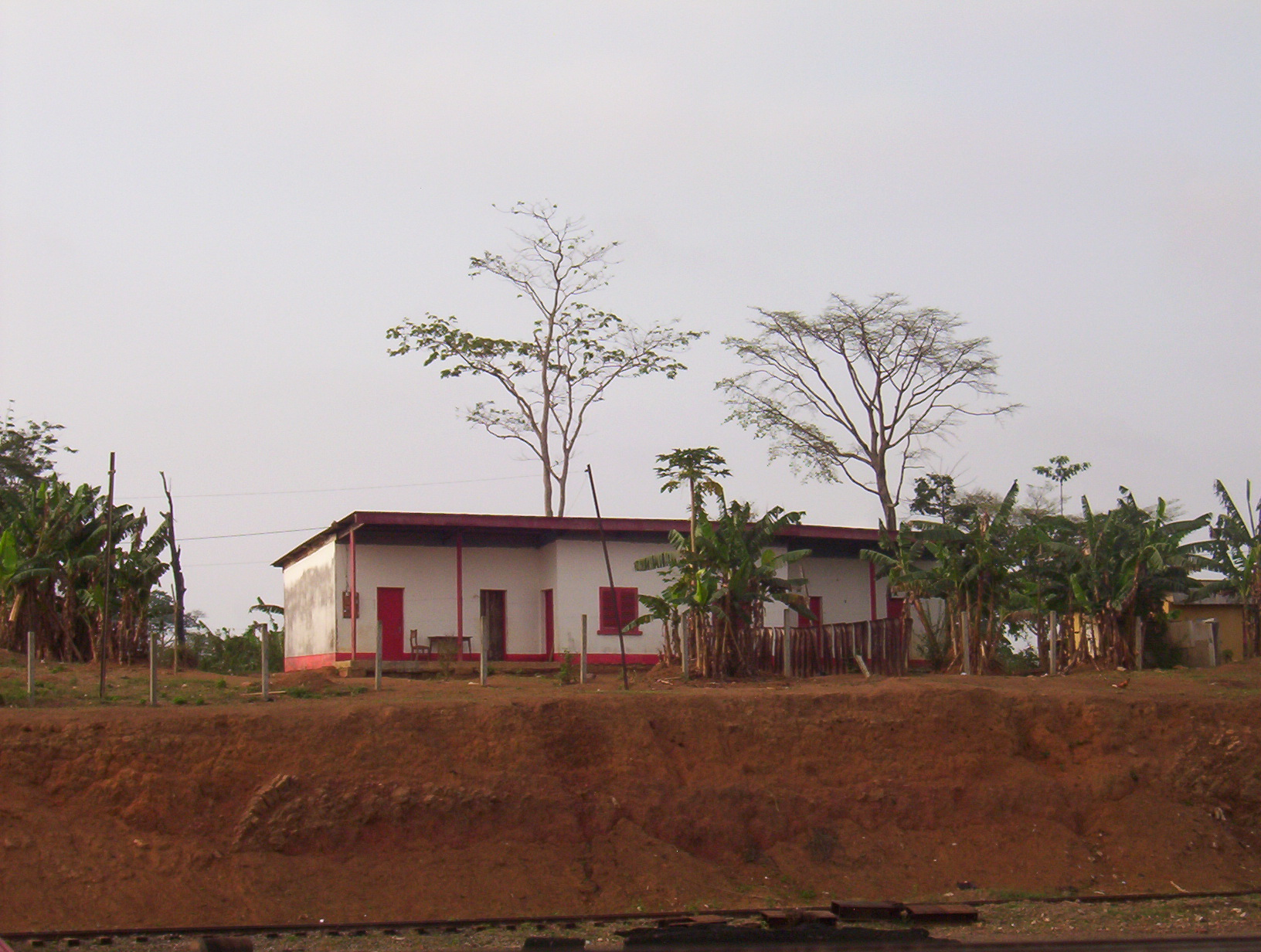
A building nearby the railway

== See also ==
- Communes of Cameroon
- Rail transport in Cameroon
