= Mbandjock =

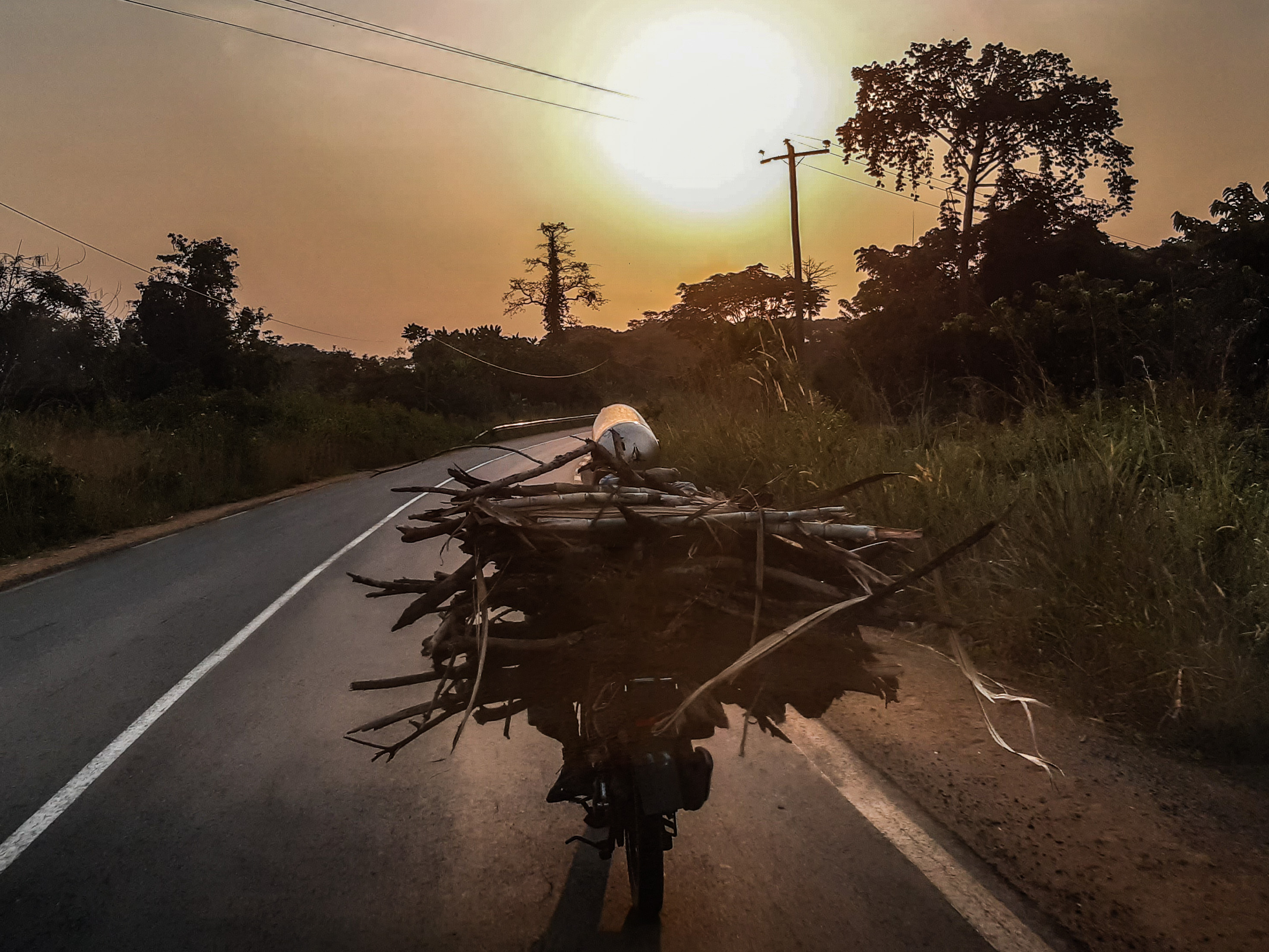
- Wood being transported through Mbandjock

- Location in Cameroon
- Coordinates: 4°27′N 11°54′E
- Country: Cameroon
- Province: Centre Province
- Division: Haute-Sanaga
- Elevation: 516 m (1,693 ft)

Population (2012)
  - Total: 21,841

Mbandjock is a city located in the Centre Province of Cameroon.

== See also ==
- Communes of Cameroon
