= Magba =

Magba Ng'afumuland
- Commune and town
- Nickname: Tikari-West
- Location in Cameroon
- Coordinates: 5°57′N 11°13′E
- Country: Cameroon
- Region: West
- Department: Noun
- District Capital: Magba
- Elevation: 735 m (2,411 ft)

Population (2012)
  - Total: auto
- 21040
- Time zone: UTC+1 (WAT)

Magba is a town and commune in Cameroon, home to the Bamoun people people.

== See also ==
- Communes of Cameroon
