= Asseng Protais =

Asseng Protais (1946 – 30 June 2006) was a Cameroonian playwright.

== Life ==
Protais was born in Nanga-Eboko, a small town in Cameroon located along the Sanaga River. He wrote over 10 plays from 1969 through to 1983, with five selections from his works receiving international awards. One of his pieces, Enough is Enough, which he wrote in 1978 while he was studying engineering in Paris, was the winner of the 1978 Prix des Auditeurs du Concours Interafricain. The play is a satirical work in which Protais blended the contemporary French comedy of the time with African-style storytelling in order to promote the concept of family planning. The inaugural production of Enough is Enough was performed in his home country of Cameroon in 1979, and it was translated into English by Alex Gross, for the Ubu Repertory Theater in 1985. In 1994, whilst serving as a professor at Indiana University, Protais made a public claim in relation to the film Junior. He believed that writer Kevin Wade and director Chris Conrad used Enough is Enough as inspiration without crediting the Cameroonian writer (the film depicts Arnold Schwarzenegger as a scientist who undergoes a male pregnancy as part of a scientific experiment).

Another well-received play by Protais, Homme Femme, was written in 1983 and won the "Prix du concours Theatral" (a concours sponsored by Radio France International (RFI)). Later, in 1991, the play Bokassa Ier earned Protais the award, "Grand prix des rencontres litteraire de yaounde".

== Death ==
Protais died on 30 June 2006 from paludism (also known as malaria or swamp virus).

== Essays and articles ==
His works often tackle gender roles, political satire, and family planning, making them distinct from other Cameroonian writers who focus more on historical narratives, folklore, or postcolonial themes. Mongo Beti is known for his political activism and novels critiquing colonialism, while Ferdinand Oyono explores themes of colonial oppression and African identity in works like Houseboy. In contrast, Protais uses humor and allegory to address contemporary social issues, making his plays more accessible to a wide audience. Some of his works include but are not limited to:

- "Enough is Enough" (1978) – A satirical play promoting family planning, which won the Prix des Auditeurs du Concours Interafricain.
- "Homme Femme" (1983) – A play that won the Prix du concours Theatral, sponsored by Radio France International.
- "Trop c'est trop" – Explores themes of gender dynamics and societal expectations
- "Demain la liberté" - 1991
