= Dizangue =

- Village
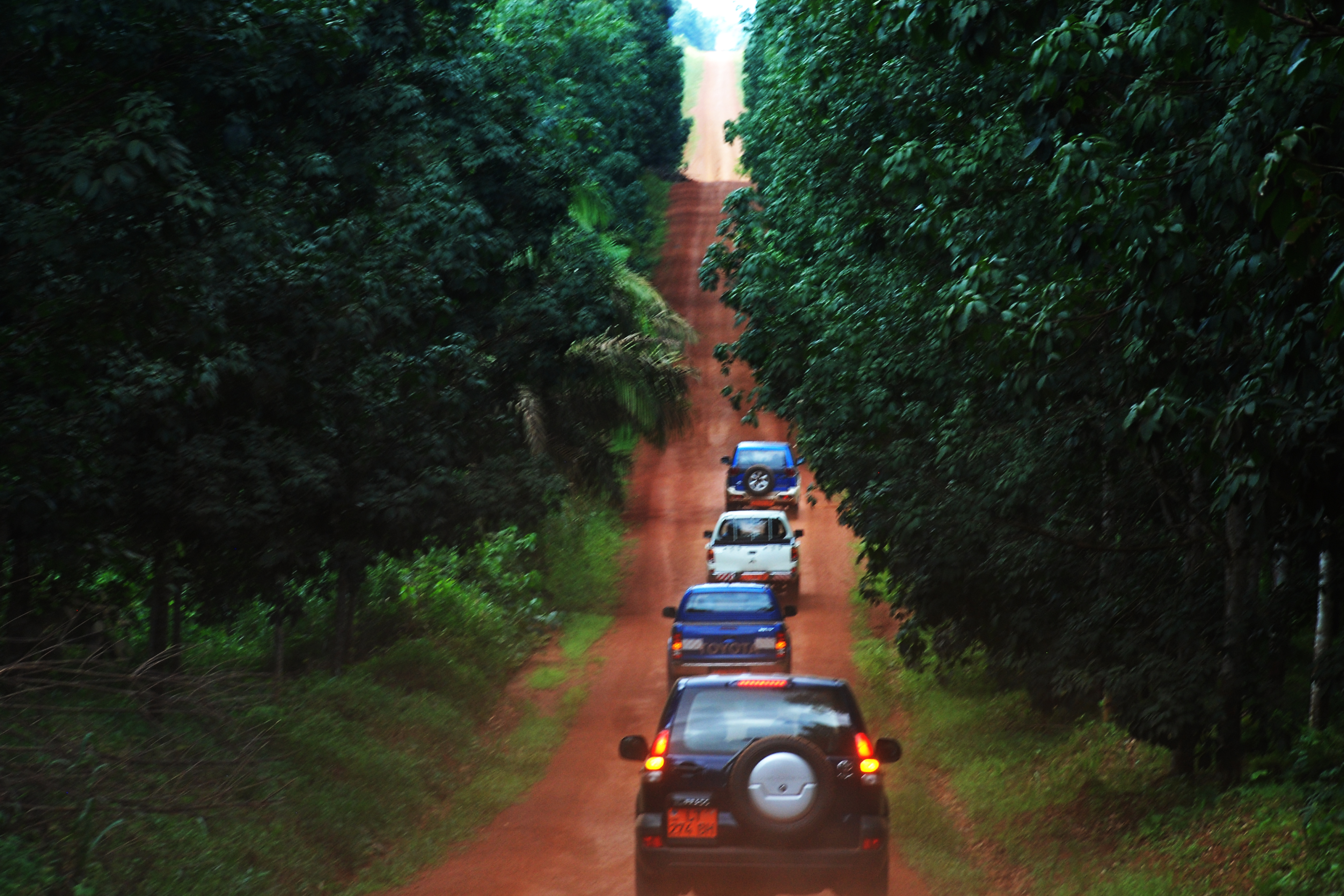
- Dizangue road

- Location in Cameroon Dizangue (Africa)
- Coordinates: 3°46′0″N 9°59′0″E
- Country: Cameroon
- Province: Littoral Province
- Division: Sanaga-Maritime Division

Area
  - Total: 367.8 sq mi (952.7 km^{2})
- Elevation: 200 ft (61 m)

Population (2005)
  - Total: 17,086
  - Density: 46.4/sq mi (17.93/km^{2})

Dizangue is a village in the Littoral Province of Cameroon. It is located at around 3°46′N 9°59′E in the Sanaga-Maritime Division.

== Personalities ==
- Thomas Nkono, former football goalkeeper (1955)

== See also ==
- Communes of Cameroon
