= Nkuv =

Village in North-West Region, Cameroon

Population
  - Total: 2,000

Nkuv is a farming village in the Bui Division of the North-West Region of Cameroon. It is about 20 kilometres (12 mi) from Kumbo, the second largest city in the province.

== Demographics ==
The home of many Nso people, the village has a population of about 2,000 inhabitants. The population of Nkuv has steadily increased due to the internally displaced people (IDPs) particularly from Kumbo, due to the socio-political crisis in Cameroon that started in 2016. Many have made Nkuv their home. The Kumbo Urban Council has a farm project called The Nkuv Palm Plantation project, however, this plantation hasn't fared well, since the socio-political crisis in Cameroon has left the Kumbo Urban Council in a moribund state.

== Economy ==
Many seasonal farmers who reside in Dzeng, Bamdzeng, Mbiame, Kingomen, Mbuluf, Shisong and Kumbo own and operate farms in Nkuv. Farming in Nkuv is principally subsistence farming, with the farmers cultivating corn, beans, cassava, bananas, plantains, yams, soybeans, groundnuts (or peanuts) and others. Like other grassland villages, Nkuv has two seasons: dry season and rainy season. Rainy season is an intense farming season and usually starts in March when the first rains trigger the commencement of planting, especially corn, beans, and groundnuts. In the recent past rainfall has fluctuated, affecting planting schedules. Moreover, yield since 2015 has not been very impressive, pushing inhabitants and new arrivals to move to Nte-ev towards the Bamoun-Nso boundary.
