= Lembe-Yezoum =

Coordinates: 4.6298°N 11.7068°E

- Commune and town
- Interactive map of Lembe-Yezoum
- Country: Cameroon
- Time zone: UTC+1 (WAT)

Lembe-Yezoum is a town and commune in Cameroon.

== See also ==
- Communes of Cameroon
