= Dzeng =

Coordinates: 3°45′41″N 11°53′11″E

- Commune and town
- Interactive map of Dzeng
- Country: Cameroon
- Time zone: UTC+1 (WAT)

Dzeng is a town and commune in Cameroon.

== See also ==
- Communes of Cameroon
