= Nsem =

Coordinates: 4°53′N 12°56′E

- Commune and town
- Interactive map of Nsem
- Country: Cameroon
- Time zone: UTC+1 (WAT)

Nsem is a town and commune in Cameroon.

== See also ==
- Communes of Cameroon
