= Subdivisions of Cameroon =

Sub-divided regions in Camerun

Cameroon is divided into 10 regions.

The constitution divides Cameroon into 10 semi-autonomous regions, each under the administration of an elected Regional Council. A presidential decree of 12 November 2008 officially instigated the change from provinces to regions. Each region is headed by a presidentially appointed governor. These leaders are charged with implementing the will of the president, reporting on the general mood and conditions of the regions, administering the civil service, keeping the peace, and overseeing the heads of the smaller administrative units. Governors have broad powers: they may order propaganda in their area and call in the army, gendarmes, and police. All local government officials are employees of the central government's Ministry of Territorial Administration, from which local governments also get most of their budgets.

The regions are subdivided into 58 divisions (French départements). These are headed by presidentially appointed divisional officers (préfets), who perform the governors' duties on a smaller scale. The divisions are further sub-divided into sub-divisions (360 arrondissements), headed by assistant divisional officers (sous-prefets). The districts, administered by district heads (chefs de district), are the smallest administrative units. These are found in large sub-divisions and in regions that are difficult to reach.

The three northernmost regions are the Far North (Extrême Nord), North (Nord), and Adamawa (Adamaoua). Directly south of them are the Centre (Centre) and East (Est). The South Province (Sud) lies on the Gulf of Guinea and the southern border. Cameroon's western region is split into four smaller regions: The Littoral (Littoral) and Southwest (Sud-Ouest) regions are on the coast, and the Northwest (Nord-Ouest) and West (Ouest) regions are in the western grassfields. The Northwest and Southwest were once part of British Cameroons; the other regions were in French Cameroun.
