= Departments of Cameroon =

Second-level administrative divisions

Ten regions of Cameroon

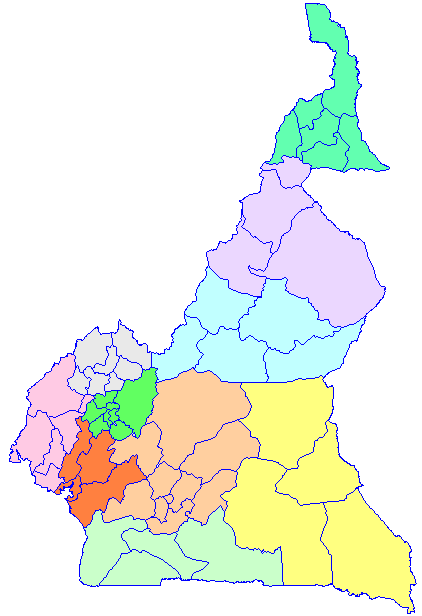
Departments of Cameroon

The regions of Cameroon are divided into 58 divisions or departments. The divisions are further subdivided into subdivisions (360 arrondissements) and districts. The divisions are listed below, by Macro-Region and region.

The constitution divides Cameroon into ten semi-autonomous regions, each under the administration of an elected Regional Council. A presidential decree of 12 November 2008 officially instigated the change from provinces to regions. Each region is headed by a presidentially appointed governor. These leaders are charged with implementing the will of the president, reporting on the general mood and conditions of the regions, administering the civil service, keeping the peace, and overseeing the heads of the smaller administrative units. Governors have broad powers: they may order propaganda in their area and call in the army, gendarmes, and police. All local government officials are employees of the central government's Ministry of Territorial Administration, from which local governments also get most of their budgets.

The regions are subdivided into 58 divisions (departments). These are headed by presidentially appointed divisional officers (préfets), who perform the governors' duties on a smaller scale. The divisions are further sub-divided into sub-divisions (arrondissements), headed by assistant divisional officers (sous-prefets). The districts, administered by district heads (chefs de district), are the smallest administrative units. These are found in large sub-divisions and in regions that are difficult to reach.

The three northernmost regions are the Far North (Extrême Nord), North (Nord), and Adamawa (Adamaoua). Directly south of them are the Centre (Centre) and East (Est). The South Province (Sud) lies on the Gulf of Guinea and the southern border. Cameroon's western region is split into four smaller regions: The Littoral (Littoral) and Southwest (Sud-Ouest) regions are on the coast, and the Northwest (Nord-Ouest) and West (Ouest) regions are in the western grassfields. The Northwest and Southwest were once part of British Cameroons; the other regions were in French Cameroun.

See summary of administrative history in Zeitlyn 2018.

== North Cameroon Macro-Region ==
=== Adamawa (Adamaoua) ===
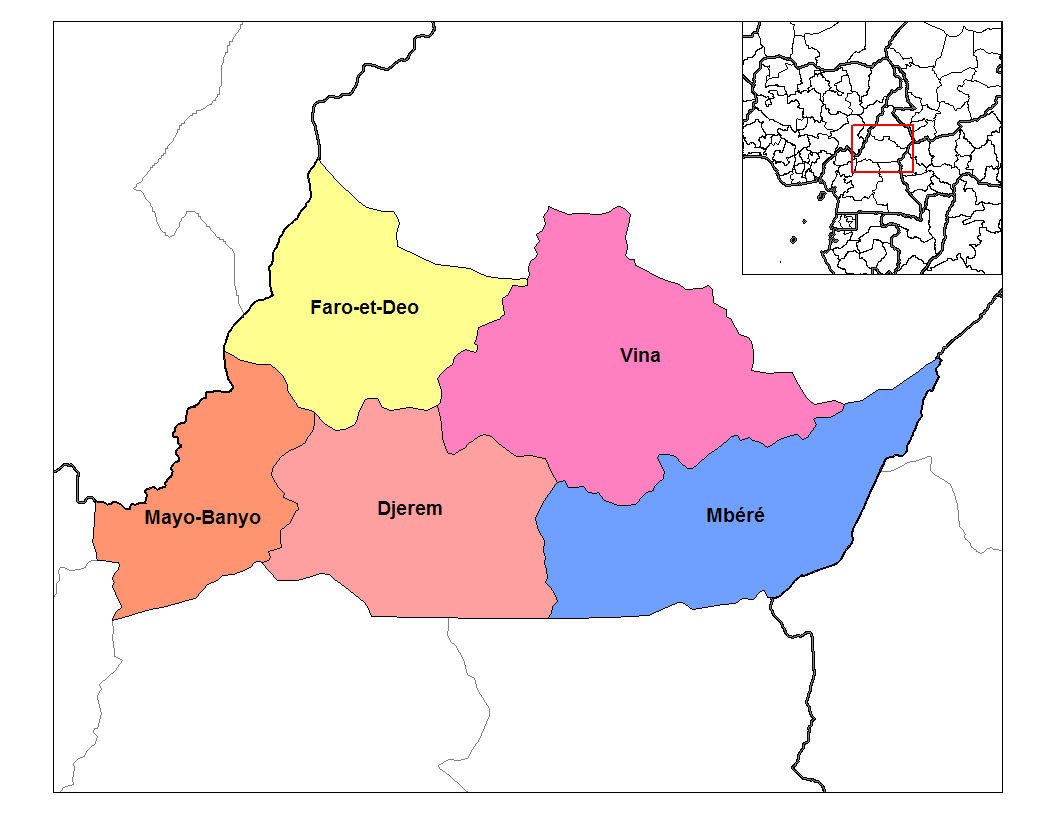
Divisions of Adamawa province

The Adamawa province of Cameroon contains the following five departments:

1. Djérem
2. Faro-et-Déo
3. Mayo-Banyo
4. Mbéré
5. Vina

=== Far North (Extrême-Nord) ===
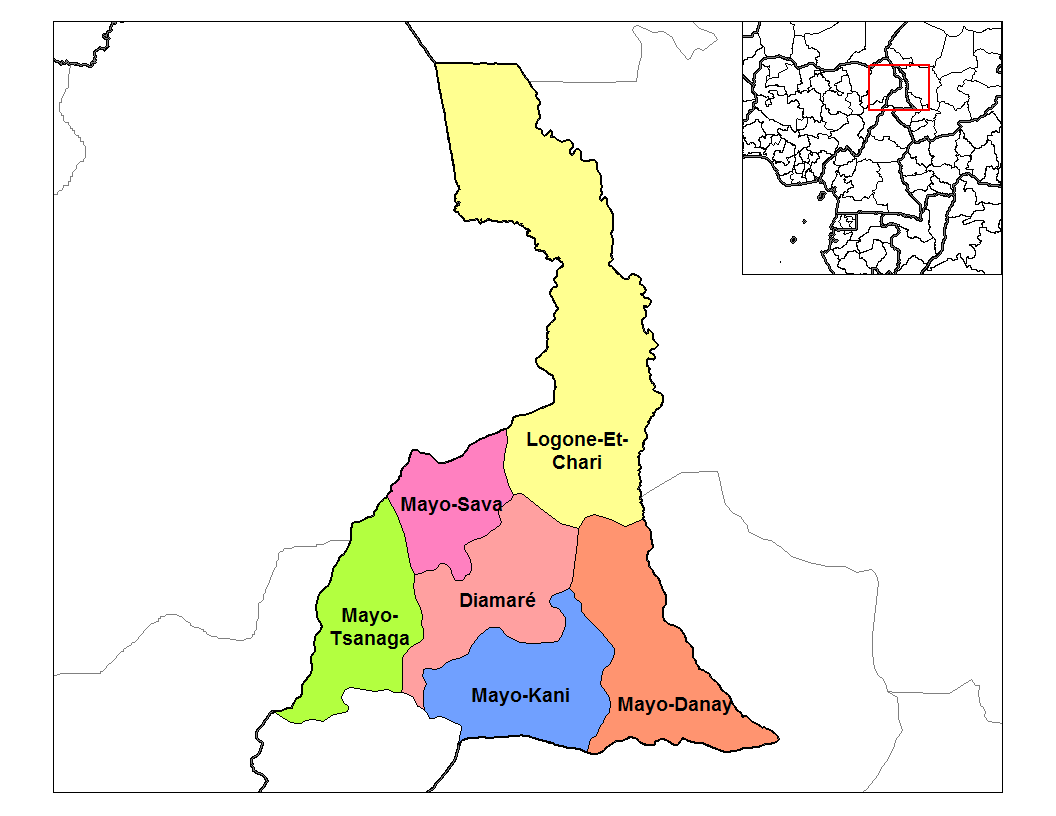
Divisions of Far North province

The Far North province of Cameroon contains the following six departments:

1. Diamaré
2. Logone-et-Chari
3. Mayo-Danay
4. Mayo-Kani
5. Mayo-Sava
6. Mayo-Tsanaga

=== North (Nord) ===
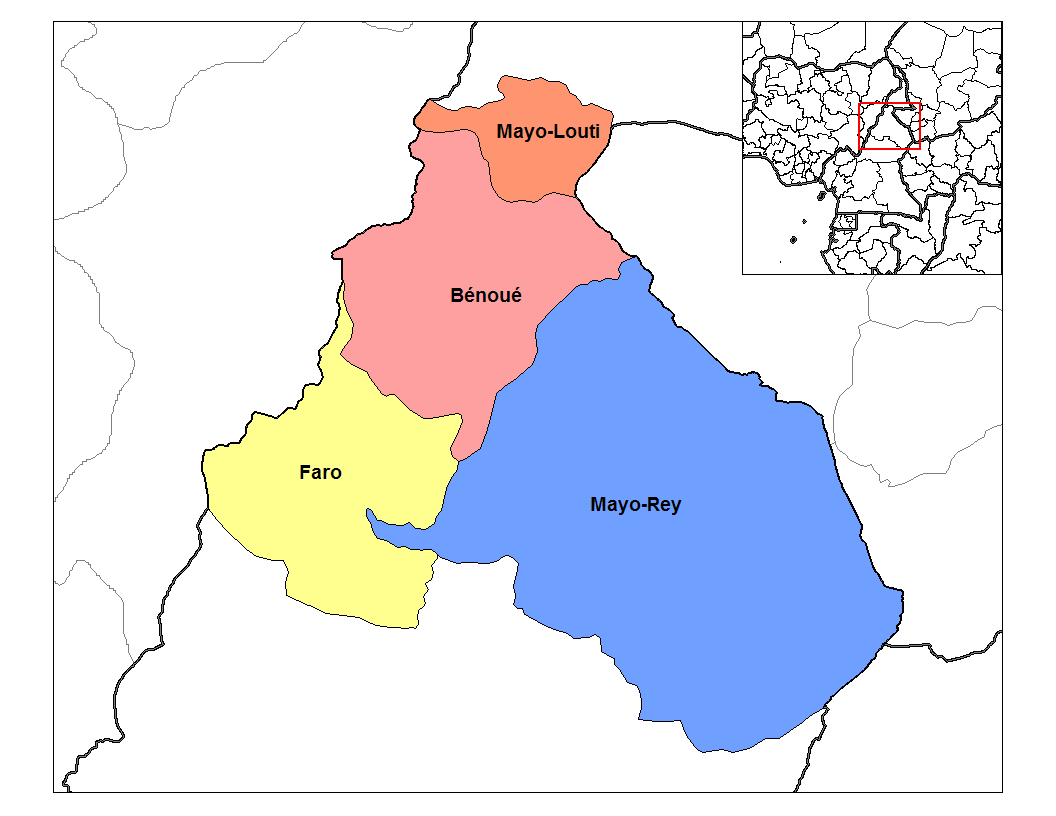
Divisions of North province

The North province of Cameroon contains the following four departments:

1. Bénoué
2. Faro
3. Mayo-Louti
4. Mayo-Rey

== South Cameroon Macro-Region ==
=== Centre ===
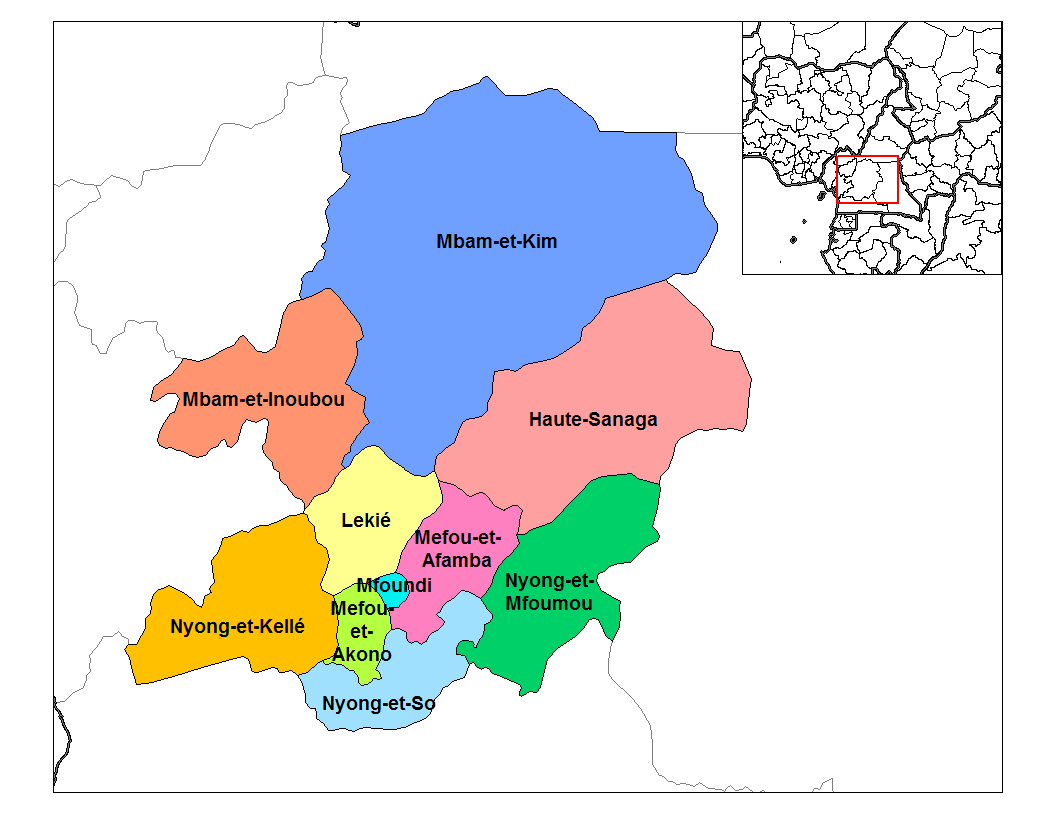
Divisions of Centre region

The Centre region of Cameroon contains the following ten departments:

1. Haute-Sanaga
2. Lekié
3. Mbam-et-Inoubou
4. Mbam-et-Kim
5. Méfou-et-Afamba
6. Méfou-et-Akono
7. Mfoundi
8. Nyong-et-Kéllé
9. Nyong-et-Mfoumou
10. Nyong-et-So'o

=== East (Est) ===
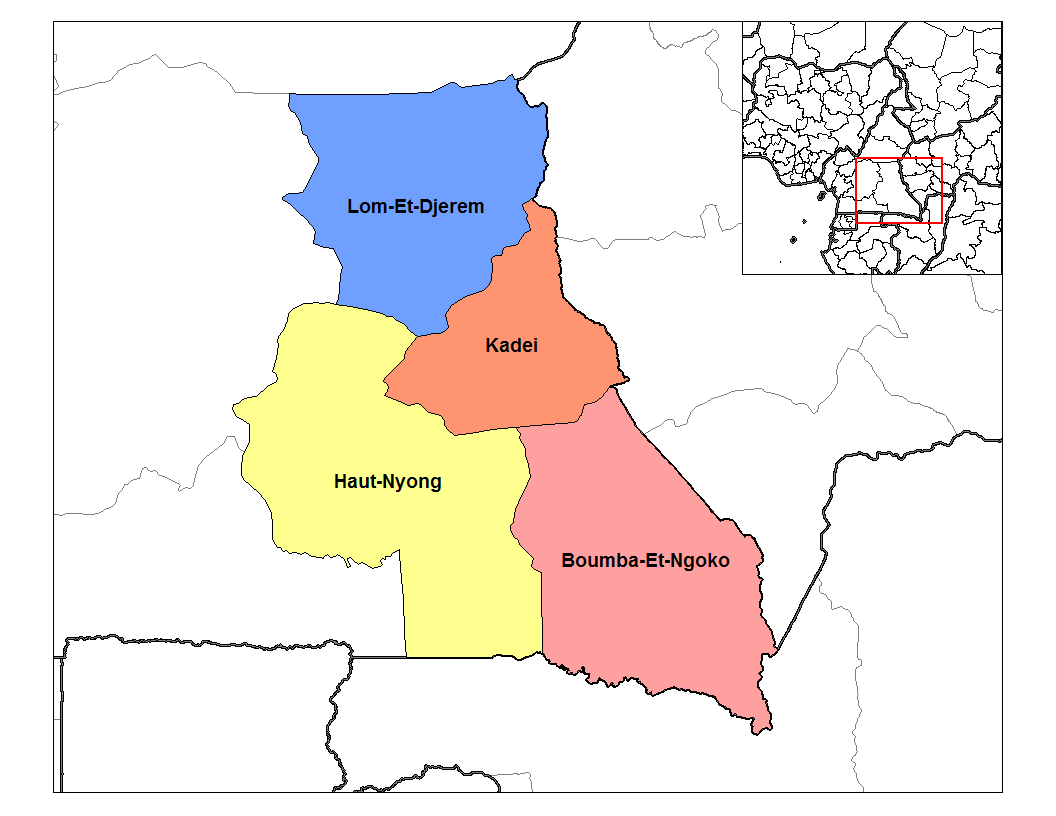
Divisions of East province

The East province of Cameroon contains the following four departments:

1. Boumba-et-Ngoko
2. Haut-Nyong
3. Kadey
4. Lom-et-Djerem

=== South (Sud) ===
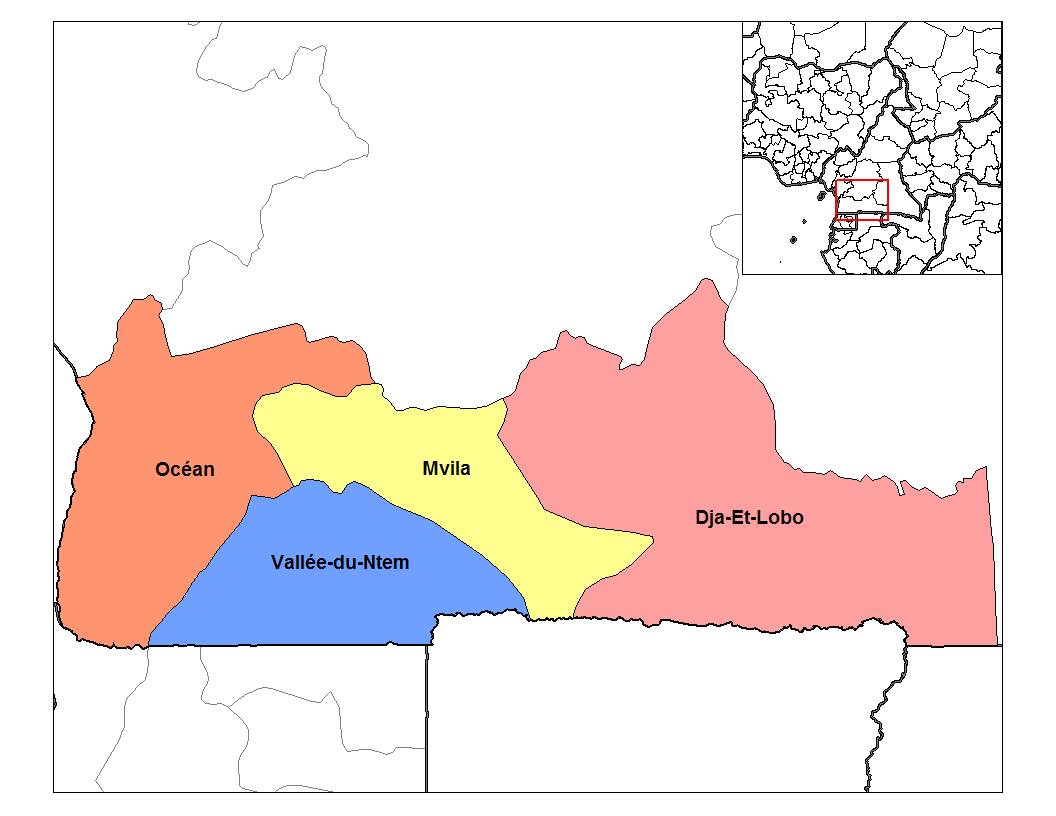
Divisions of South province

The South province of Cameroon contains the following four departments:

1. Dja-et-Lobo
2. Mvila
3. Océan
4. Vallée-du-Ntem

== West Cameroon Macro-Region ==
=== Littoral ===
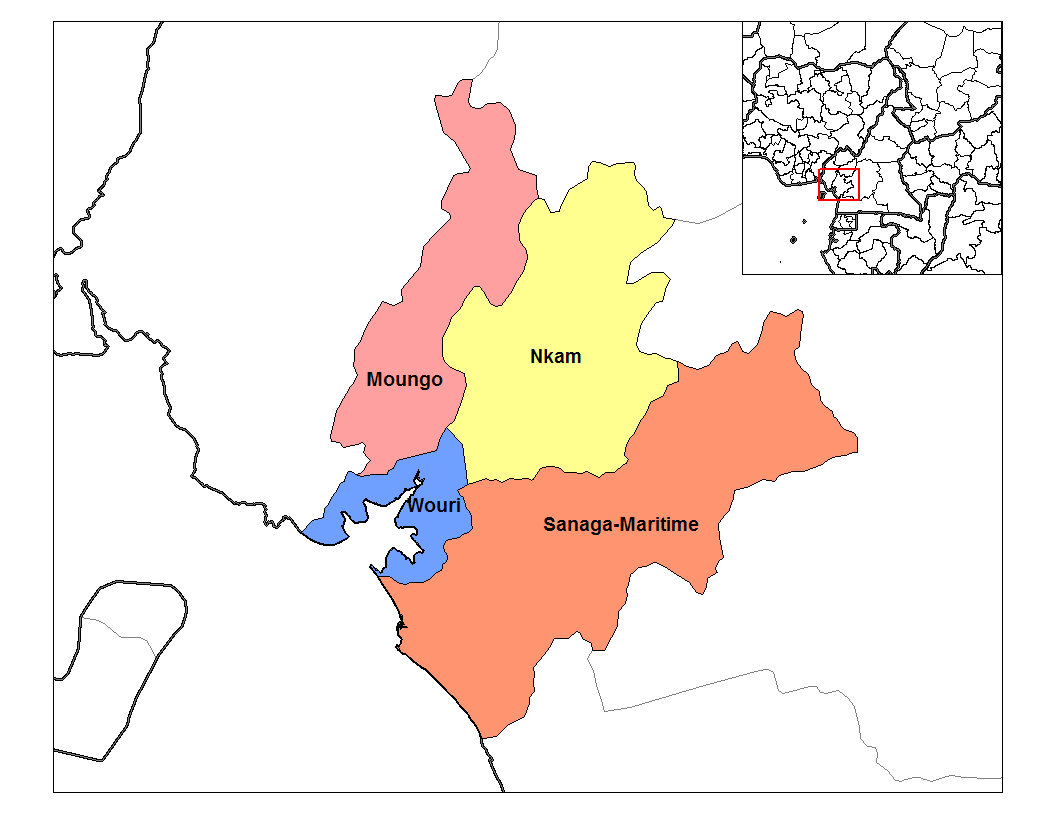
Divisions of Littoral province

The Littoral province of Cameroon contains the following four departments:

1. Moungo
2. Nkam
3. Sanaga-Maritime
4. Wouri

=== Northwest (Nord-Ouest) ===
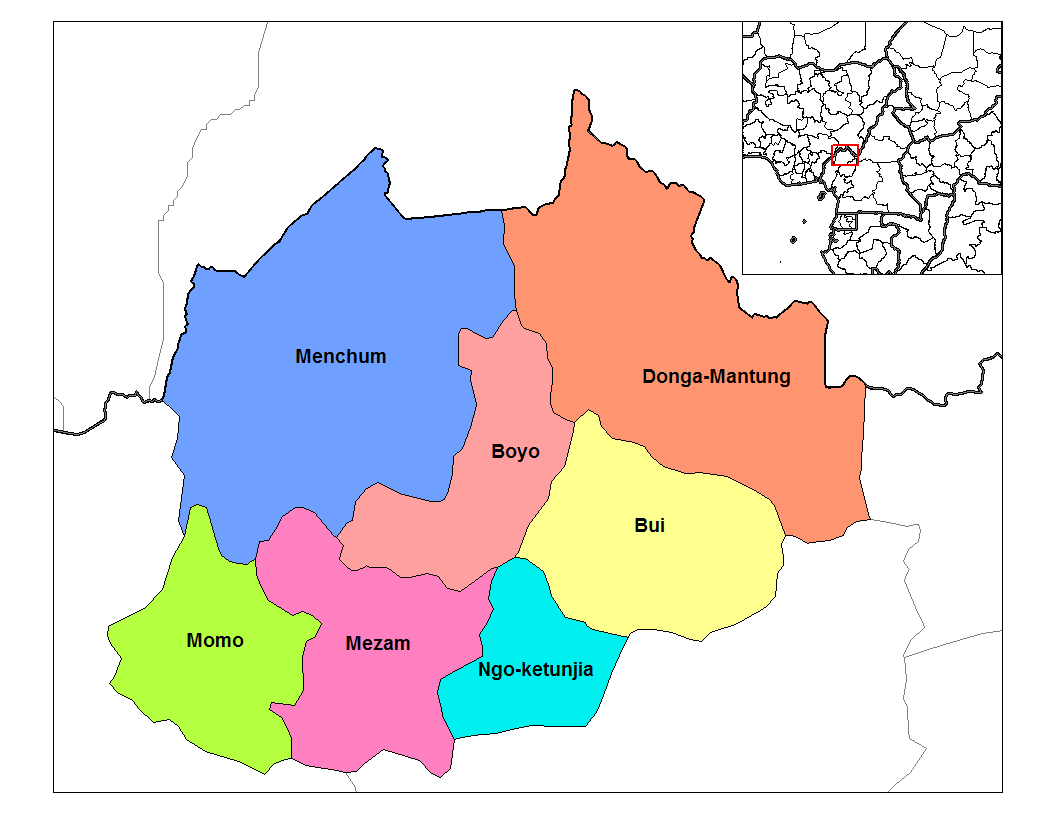
Divisions of Northwest province

The Northwest province of Cameroon contains the following seven departments:

1. Boyo
2. Bui
3. Donga-Mantung
4. Menchum
5. Mezam
6. Momo
7. Ngo-ketunjia

=== Southwest (Sud-Ouest) ===
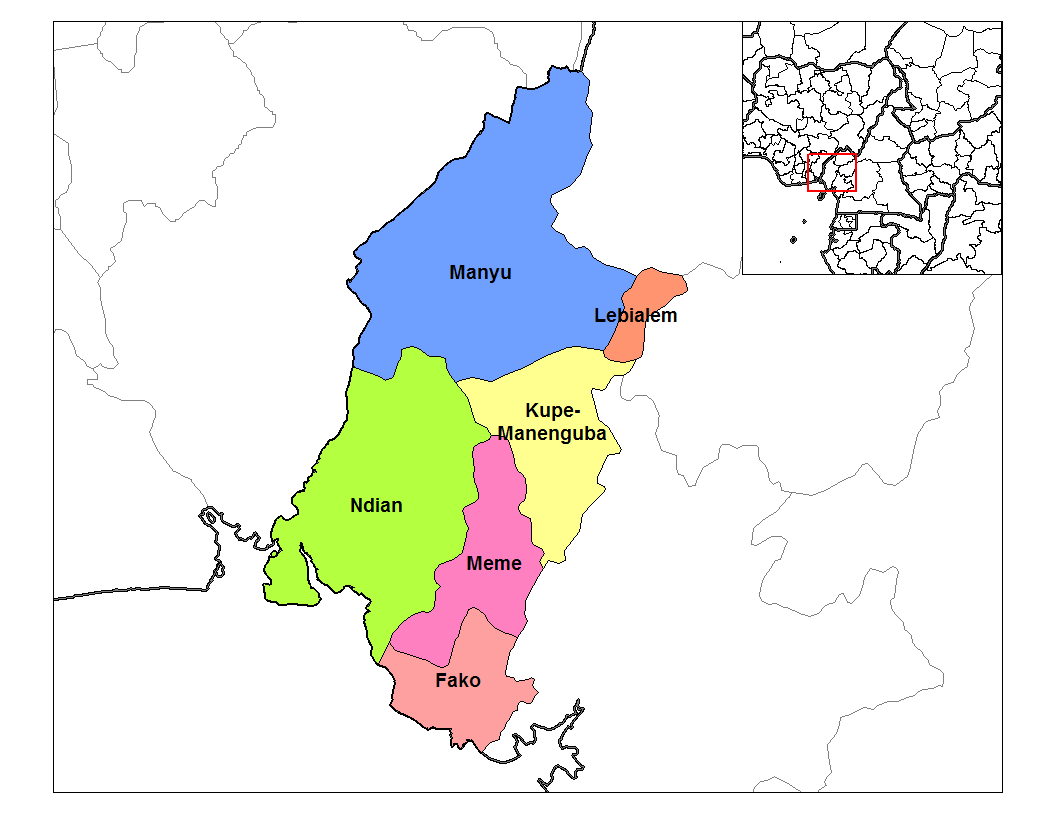
Divisions of Southwest province

The Southwest province of Cameroon contains the following six departments:

1. Fako
2. Koupé-Manengouba
3. Lebialem
4. Manyu
5. Meme
6. Ndian

=== West (Ouest) ===
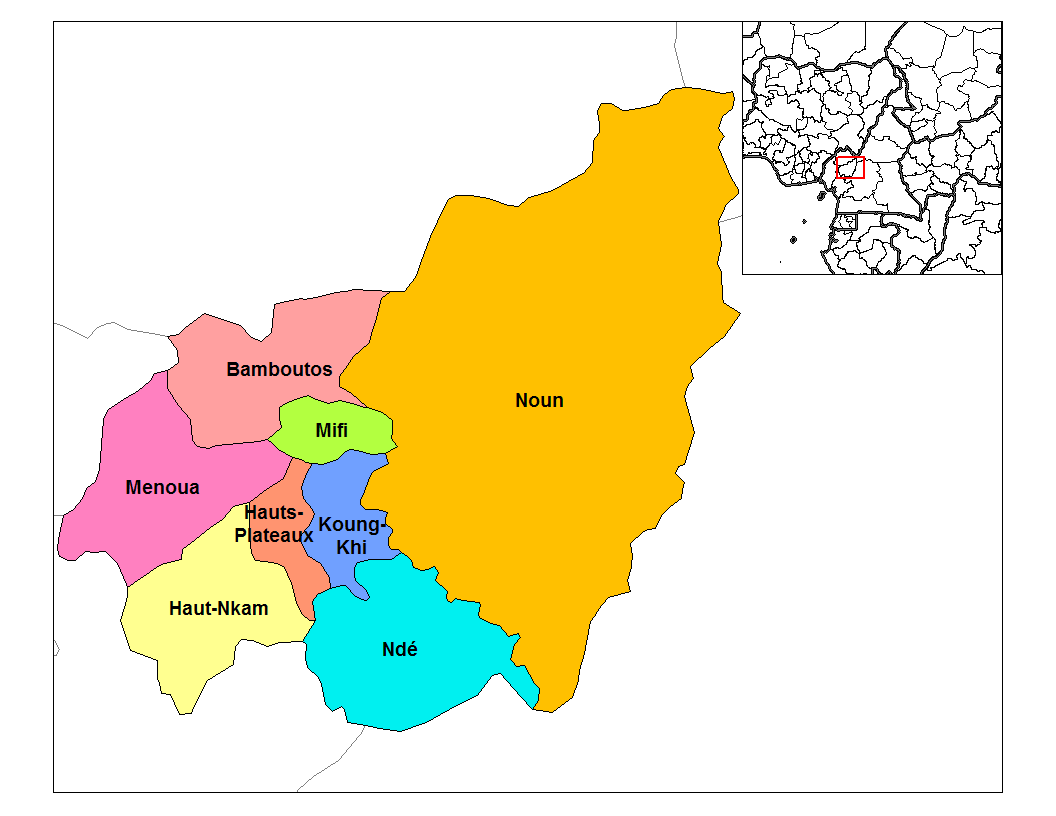
Divisions of West province

The West province of Cameroon contains the following eight departments:

1. Bamboutos
2. Haut-Nkam
3. Hauts-Plateaux
4. Koung-Khi
5. Menoua
6. Mifi
7. Ndé
8. Noun

== See also ==
- Communes of Cameroon
- Subdivisions of Cameroon
- List of municipalities of Cameroon
