= Regions of Cameroon =

First-level administrative divisions of Cameroon

Regions of Cameroon Régions du Cameroun (French)
- Category: Unitary state
- Location: Republic of Cameroon
- Number: 10
- Government: Semi-autonomous regional government
- Subdivisions: Department

The Republic of Cameroon is divided into ten regions.

== History ==
Between 1961 and 1972, Cameroon was a federal republic made up of two federated states, East Cameroon and West Cameroon.

A unitary system came into being in 1972. The country was then divided into provinces. In 1983, Centre-South Province was divided into Centre and South and at the same time, Adamawa and Far North Provinces were split from North Province. See summary of administrative history in Zeitlyn 2018.

In 2008, the President of the Republic of Cameroon, President Paul Biya signed decrees abolishing "provinces" and replacing them with "regions". Hence, all of the country's ten provinces are now known as regions.

The Northwest region and Southwest region were granted special status in December 2019, giving them additional powers.

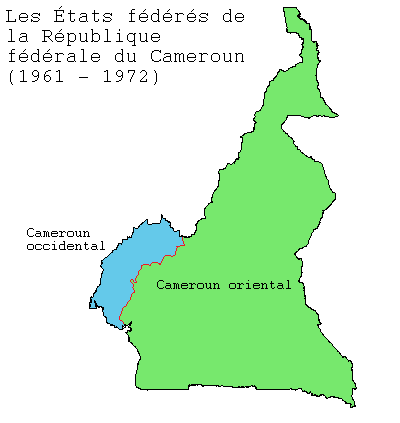
States of the Federal Republic of Cameroon (1961–1972)

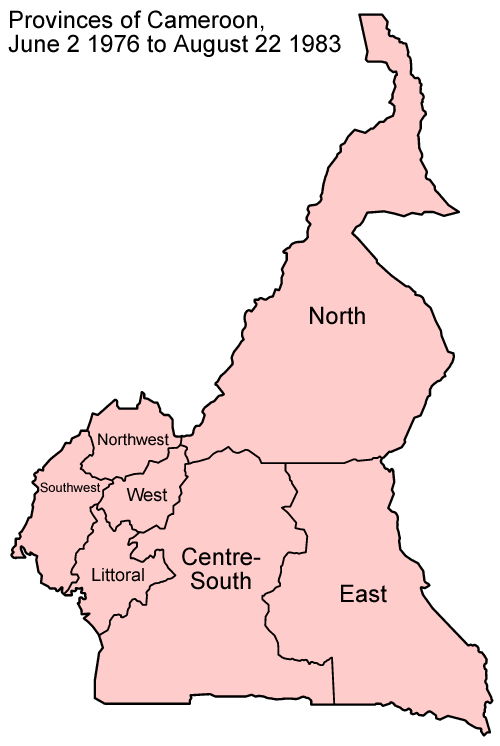
Provinces of Cameroon (1972–1983)

== List ==
No.	Region	French name	Capital	Population (2005 census)	Population (2022 est.)	Area (km^{2})	Population density (per km^{2})
1.	Adamawa	Adamaoua	Ngaoundéré	903,000	1,124,000	63,701	8
2.	Centre	Centre	Yaoundé	3,105,000	3,905,000	68,953	24
3.	East	Est	Bertoua	783,000	830,000	109,002	5
4.	Far North	Extrême-Nord	Maroua	3,119,000	3,796,000	34,263	54
5.	Littoral	Littoral	Douala	2,502,000	3,178,000	20,248	67
6.	North	Nord	Garoua	1,703,000	2,297,000	66,090	13
7.	Northwest	Nord-Ouest	Bamenda	1,735,000	1,906,000	17,300	69
8.	South	Sud	Ebolowa	641,000	773,000	47,191	8
9.	Southwest	Sud-Ouest	Buea	1,325,000	1,503,000	25,410	34
10.	West	Ouest	Bafoussam	1,712,000	1,875,000	13,892	97

== See also ==
- Communes of Cameroon
- Departments of Cameroon
- ISO 3166-2:CM
- List of municipalities of Cameroon by population
- List of regions of Cameroon by Human Development Index
- Subdivisions of Cameroon

== Citations ==
- Law, Gwillim (2005). "Provinces of Cameroon". statoids.com.
