= Marcien Towa =

Cameroonian philosopher (1931–2014)

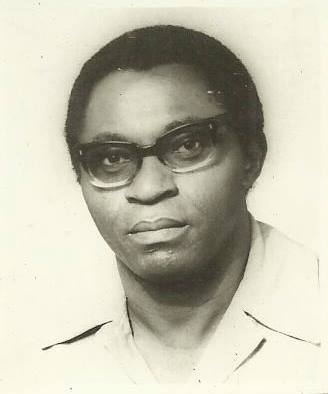
- Born: January 5, 1931; Endama, Cameroon
- Died: July 2, 2014 (aged 83); Yaoundé, Cameroon

Marcien Towa (January 5, 1931 – July 2, 2014) was a Cameroonian philosopher. He is considered one of the icons of African philosophy in the twentieth century.

In 1971, he gained fame by publishing two essays: one about Léopold Sédar Senghor, titled "Léopold Sédar Senghor: Négritude ou Servitude?" and the other," titled "Essai sur la problématique philosophique dans l'Afrique actuelle." He taught at the École Normale Supérieure of Yaoundé from 1962 to 2006. Marcien Towa also served as the Rector of the University of Yaoundé II from January 29, 1993 to October 21, 1993, and as the mayor of Elig-Mfomo (1996-2002).

== Biography ==
Towa was born on January 5, 1931, in Endama, a small village near Obala. From 1941 to 1946, he attended the public school in Endama. From 1947 until 1955, the year he obtained his baccalaureate, he attended successively the pre-seminary of Mva’a, the minor seminary of Akono, and the major seminary of Otélé. In February 1957, he began his higher education in his fourth year at the École Normale d’Instituteurs in Caen in the middle of the second trimester. He obtained the CFEN (Certificate of Completion of Normal Studies) in May of the same year. In April, he enrolled in the Faculty of Letters and Humanities at the University of Caen with special authorization from the Minister of National Education (due to the delay). This delay did not prevent him from obtaining his Philosophy degree in June 1959.

On June 2 of the following year, he obtained a DES (Diploma of Higher Studies) with a thesis on Hegel and Bergson. On October 20 of the same year, he obtained his Biology Certificate in Paris.

Between 1961 and 1962, Marcien Towa completed a teaching internship and taught in several Parisian high schools (Louis-le-Grand, Molière, among others). On September 9, 1962, he returned to Cameroon, where he was appointed Professor of Pedagogy, History of Pedagogy, and Philosophy at the École Normale Supérieure (ENS) of Yaoundé. In the same year, he also taught at the EMIA (Inter-Arms Military School) in Yaoundé.

From November 3, 1963, to 1965, a UNESCO scholarship took him to Paris, London, Birmingham, Moscow, Baku, and Leningrad. During this period, he obtained his Certificate of Higher Studies in Pedagogy at the Sorbonne in June 1964 and pursued studies in psychology and pedagogy at the Rousseau Institute in Geneva in 1965.

In January 1966, Marcien Towa returned to Cameroon and resumed teaching at the ENS. His courses included general pedagogy, history of pedagogy, philosophy, and African literature. Between 1966 and 1968, he was successively appointed Director of Studies and then Deputy Director of the ENS of Yaoundé, before joining the Department of Philosophy at the Federal University of Yaoundé as a Lecturer from October 1968 to 1970.

On February 4, 1969, Marcien Towa defended his Doctorate in Philosophy at the Sorbonne under the supervision of Lucien Goldmann with the dissertation "Qu’est-ce que la Négritude?" This thesis allowed him to be appointed Head of the Philosophy Department at the University of Yaoundé, a position he held until 1981.

In July 1977, Marcien Towa defended his State Doctorate in Philosophy under the direction of Paul Ricœur (after Lucien Goldmann died), with a dissertation titled "Identité et Transcendance."

Between 1978 and 1979, he was a visiting professor at the University of Sherbrooke in Quebec, Canada. From 1981 to 1991, Marcien Towa served as the Head of the Department of African Thought at the CREA (Center for Research in Anthropological Studies) of the ISH (Institute of Human Sciences) at the DGRST (General Delegation for Scientific and Technical Research) in Yaoundé. From January 29, 1993, to October 21, 1993, he was the Rector of the newly established University of Yaoundé II Soa.

After this period, he returned to the Department of Philosophy at the Faculty of Arts, Letters, and Humanities of the new University of Yaoundé I (formerly the University of Cameroon), where he taught until 1999, the year he officially retired at the age of 68. He became an adjunct professor there from 1999 to 2006.

In 1996, having reached the age of 65 and eligible for retirement from academic life, his acquaintances encouraged him to run for the mayoralty of Elig-Mfomo. He won the elections and became the first Mayor of this rural municipality, located in the Lékié Department, Central Region of Cameroon. He held this position from 1996 until 2002.

Marcien Towa died on July 2, 2014, in Yaoundé after a long illness.

== Philosophy ==
=== Definition of Philosophy ===
Marcien Towa's philosophy is fundamentally centered on the liberation of humanity. Specifically, it seeks to free individuals from the despotic authority of ideological or political systems that impede their freedom. Thus, Towa's philosophy is fundamentally an ode to freedom, defined both formally and practically.

In this exaltation of freedom, thought and reason play a crucial role, as they are, for Towa, the marks of a free spirit. The faculty at work in human-free activity is the reason, and its product is thought. Therefore, philosophy can only ever be an apology for freedom, that is, for reason and thought. Thought, in its essence, is critical as it encourages the use of reason, which operates primarily in a negative way. This is the "restrictive" sense that Towa assigns to the verb "think." He explains that to think means to "weigh," "discuss representations, beliefs, opinions," "confront them," "examine the pros and cons of each," "sort them out," and "retain as true only those that withstand this trial of criticism and sorting."

Through this "restrictive" vision of the term "think," Towa situates himself in the philosophical tradition initiated by Descartes and emphasizes the critical aspect of philosophy. Thus, he proposes to define this activity as the "thought of the Absolute."

The term Absolute here refers to anything that poses or presents itself to humanity as an obstacle to its fulfillment, that is, to thought. The Absolute is what does not want to be thought, what resists this movement, but which philosophy must necessarily think.

For Towa, the Absolute is expressed in two ways, each of which implies a positive and negative expression.

First, there is the ideological Absolute, which is expressed negatively as myth (the most elaborate of which is God) and positively as values. Theoretically, philosophy must therefore think about divinity and values, which appear as the guiding threads of human life. Essentially, philosophy rejects the authority of God, that is, in general, any idea of the "sacred insofar as it seeks to impose itself on humanity from the outside." In other words, the only authority, the supreme authority recognized by philosophy, that is, thought as it unfolds concretely, is reason itself: this is why "philosophy is essentially sacrilegious." In this essentially critical perspective, philosophy destroys the idea of God as the foundation of values.

Towa thus distances himself from a significant portion of philosophy and asserts that the desacralization of God does not lead to the destruction of values. On the contrary, eliminating God leaves more room for humanity to reflect on itself and the meaning of its life. Norms should no longer be imposed from the outside, but from within, by reason in a critical dialogue with itself.

Next, there is the practical Absolute that Towa identifies as a tradition. According to him, tradition uses the same "camouflage" as God, by presenting itself as sacred. Towa applies the same previous critique to tradition while noting that tradition should be understood in two ways. First negatively, to criticize it, but also and especially positively, to continue it. This is the meaning of Towa's distinction between "tradition" and "traditionalism."

He writes that "Traditionalism is the immobilization of tradition through sacralization or naturalization"; it "encloses and limits," whereas true tradition is a "creative praxis," the moment when our ancestors—those from whom we inherit tradition in the form of value systems, customs, morals, etc.—were creators.

For Towa, "The artisans of tradition were themselves creators," and we honor them not by faithfully reproducing what they left us but by honoring their memory, that is, by positioning ourselves as they were: creators. Practically, philosophy is the objectification of this double iconoclastic and revolutionary aim.

== Marcien Towa's Critical Philosophy ==
=== Critique of Senghor ===
A fundamental dimension of Marcien Towa's thought is criticism. He became famous in this field by criticizing the Senegalese President Léopold Sédar Senghor, whom he accused of distorting the revolutionary dimension of the Negritude movement to the point of aligning it with colonialism.

According to Marcien Towa, Senghorian Negritude opposes the very foundations of the movement because its goal is to neutralize the Black person, making them accept reality as it is. This critique is consistent in Towa's work, from his Third Cycle Doctorate thesis (Poetry of Negritude) to his State Doctorate (Identity and Transcendence). Towa concludes that Senghor's poetry presents an intolerable vision of the Black person, one that confuses the biological with the cultural: this is the "colonization of culture," which essentially amounts to racism.

== Critique of Ethno-philosophy ==
By the term "ethno-philosophy," Marcien Towa refers to a line of thought stemming from the desire of both Africans and non-Africans to bring forth a cultural expression from the past to oppose Western imperialism and racism. However, this term carries a pejorative connotation, implying that adherents of this discipline betray both ethnology and philosophy.

Ethno-philosophy betrays ethnology, according to Towa, because its depiction of culture is not objective, and it betrays philosophy because it lacks critical examination of this depiction.

Furthermore, it is important to distinguish Marcien Towa's critique of ethno-philosophy from those of Césaire, Eboussi Boulaga, and Paulin Hountondji.

Césaire, Eboussi Boulaga, and Paulin Hountondji primarily reference a Belgian missionary named Placide Tempels, who published a book in 1945 titled 'La philosophie Pantone', and to a lesser extent, for Eboussi Boulaga (in *La crise du Muntu*) and Hountondji, Alexis Kagame. Marcien Towa's critique, on the other hand, explicitly targets Basile-Juléat Fouda and Alassane Ndaw.

== Criticism of Marcien ==
=== Towa's Proximity to Hegel ===
A constant reproach against Marcien Towa concerns his proximity to Georg Wilhelm Friedrich Hegel. This criticism is expressed, for example, by Basile Fouda and Sindjoun-Pokam, Yai, and more recently by Nsame Mbongo.

Sindjoun-Pokam specifically criticizes Towa for using Hegel's figure to support the idea that the philosopher embodies both knowledge and power. Yai mainly criticizes Towa (and also Hountondji) for the idealistic aspect of their reflection, arguing that this is due to Towa's close affinity with Hegelian thought. This is a similar critique to that offered by Youssouph Mbargane Guissé, who describes Towa's definition of philosophy in Essai sur la problématique philosophique dans l'Afrique actuelle as a "delirium of idealism." Essentially, this critique suggests that Towa's closeness to Hegel prevents him from realizing the concrete, social aspects of philosophy.

According to Nsame Mbongo, Towa's Hegelianism led to a harsh critique of traditional reality. The author believes this attitude can be linked to Towa's 1971 essay, where he directs his reflection in such a way that it denies the possibility of philosophy within the traditional African world. Here too, it is the definition of philosophy conceived in a Hegelian manner (with its advantages but also and especially its flaws) that leads Towa away from a thorough analysis of traditional reality.

== Occidentalism ==
=== Excessive Conceptual Reference to the West ===
This critique primarily concerns the conceptual foundations of Marcien Towa's thought, especially the geo-ideological reference point from which he formulates his definition of philosophy. From his Essai sur la problématique philosophique dans l’Afrique actuelle, Towa has advocated finding the definition of philosophy in Europe, asserting that the concept is a Western property. Thus, for Marcien Towa, understanding philosophy means understanding what those who forged the concept have to say about it. This theoretical stance is maintained in another book that partially addresses the definition of philosophy: L’idée d’une philosophie négro-africaine. Towa's goal is to establish a concept upon which different participants in the debate—Western and non-Western—can agree, thereby avoiding the "ethnophilosophical pitfall."

However, according to Olabiyi Babalola Yai, this excessive closeness to the West leads Towa to misjudge history. For Towa, in Africa's historical situation, it is not only the West that is to blame but also the Africans themselves. Yai responds by saying that "Towa's propositions ultimately appear as the very prototype of the hymn to assimilation to which the philosophism-scientism of all speculative philosophy necessarily leads." When Marcien Towa recommends that Africans "negate themselves... and fundamentally Europeanize," Yai sees this as a mark of alienation.

Charles Romain Mbélé counters this critique in his article "Marcien Towa: l’idée de l’Europe et nous." According to him, the critique of "alienation" accompanying other criticisms of "Westernization" and "negation of black cultures" are merely the results of a clumsy reading of Towa's philosophy. In reality, Towa's philosophy contains a constant element: "The critique of imperialist Europe." Invoking the distinction Towa makes between industrial civilization and Western culture, Charles Romain Mbélé argues that the critique of pro-Western extroversion is a misreading. Towa's aim is not the servile imitation of the West but precisely the access to industrial civilization. This requires mastering science and technology.

=== A Problematic Concept of Science, The Critique of Towa's Use of the Concept of Science ===
The critique of Marcien Towa's use of the concept of science unfolds in two stages, first by Jean-Godefroy Bidima and then by Nsame Mbongo. Bidima criticizes Towa for a lack of critical analysis regarding science (he applies this same critique to Hountondji as well). Specifically, Bidima argues that Towa's discourse is critical but mysteriously never considers science in any way other than as a savior for Africa. In Essai sur la problématique philosophique dans l’Afrique actuelle and all his subsequent writings, Marcien Towa identifies science and technology as the "secret of the power and domination" of Europe over Africa, hence the need for Africans to adopt the same approach to resist this domination. According to Bidima, such a concept of "pure, innocent, immaculate, triumphant, and reassuring science for Blacks" is incompatible with the critical dimension of Towa's philosophy, which regresses to the 19th century by displaying a "reflex of 19th-century positivism." Bidima further states, "We find in them [Towa and Hountondji] a bizarre attitude characterized by the suspension of critical thinking. It seems as if their reflection stops at the threshold of science (like a believer at the edge of a sanctuary)."

Nsame Mbongo primarily criticizes Towa for making science the monopoly of the West, implying that Africa is a tabula rasa in this matter and that "African rationality" is nothing more than a result of contact with "Western" rationality. Mbongo thus posits the existence of an "essentialism in Towa" without drawing the same conclusion as Yai, which is that there is collusion between Towa and Senghor. Against Towa, Mbongo argues that "Science, technology, and philosophy are not the secret of Europe that we must seek out. They are universal human capacities that each civilization must develop responsibly, without having to plagiarize others or perish."

=== Controversy Surrounding the Existence of a Negro-African Philosophy ===
The origin of the issue regarding Marcien Towa's stance on the existence of a Negro-African philosophy is not to be found in the first chapter of Essai sur la problématique philosophique dans l’Afrique actuelle, even though this chapter explicitly poses the question, "Does an African philosophy exist?" This chapter contains only Towa's analysis of various Western thinkers' opinions against the idea of an African philosophy. In this context, Towa discusses Lévy-Bruhl, Émile Bréhier, Heidegger, and Hegel, among others, as well as Masson-Oursel, as a counterbalance to Bréhier. In essence, Towa situates the history of the African philosophical problem (of the 1970s) that he is going to analyze. Tempels and his Bantu Philosophy are part of this history. However, it is primarily two books that create the controversy regarding Towa's position. Each of these books is the product of a collaboration.

The first book, La philosophie camerounaise à l’ère du soupçon : le cas Towa, is the work of a collaboration between Basile-Juléat Fouda and Sindjoun-Pokam. Sindjoun-Pokam identifies a "contradiction" in Towa between Essai sur la problématique philosophique dans l’Afrique actuelle and L’idée d’une philosophie négro-africaine. Indeed, eight years separate the publication of the two books, and Sindjoun-Pokam believes that during this period, "Towa acted as if he had moved from one position to another." The first of these positions is that of Hegel and the denial of the existence of an African philosophy; the second is that of Cheikh Anta Diop and the promotion of such a philosophy. Sindjoun-Pokam concludes that this represents a "philosophical opportunism" by which Towa hopes to "recapture the work of those he labeled Ethno-Philosophers." In essence, in 1971 (in Essai sur la problématique philosophique dans l’Afrique actuelle), while Towa denied the existence of both traditional and modern African philosophy, he affirms and defends such a thesis in 1979 (in L’idée d’une philosophie négro-africaine). A year later, Précis de philosophie pour l’Afrique by Azombo-Menda and Pierre Meyongo contributed to the controversy.

The authors write that "In his book Essai sur la problématique philosophique dans l’Afrique actuelle, Towa sharply criticized the attempts to restore and reconstruct African philosophies," which explains why Towa's name appears (in a note, annexed to Hountondji's) in the section exposing negative answers to the question "Does an African philosophy exist?" and also in the section exposing positive answers to the same question, where the authors state that in Towa, there is "the final recognition of ... the existence of a deep philosophical tradition dating back to the highest antiquity."

=== Towa, Ideologue ===
The first trace of this critique is found at the end of L’idée d’une philosophie négro-africaine, during the debate with Jean Sablé. For Sablé, L’idée d’une philosophie négro-africaine raises a "question about the literary genre" to which it belongs. This text appears to him as "an ideological combat discourse rather than a philosophical reflection primarily concerned with truth."

In 1981, in an article published in the journal Présence Africaine titled "What Can Philosophy Do?", Hountondji attacks Towa's philosophy, reducing it to ideology. In fact, the Beninese philosopher applies to his Cameroonian counterpart the same critique he had deployed in 1973 against Osagyefo. According to Hountondji, by indissolubly linking philosophy to ideology, "Nkrumah explicitly professes an instrumental conception of philosophy. Its role is merely to translate the initial and unreflective theses of ideology into more refined language." In other words, Nkrumah impoverishes philosophy, and since Towa follows in the footsteps of the Ghanaian philosopher, he is subject to the same criticism.

In "Ideologies and Utopias," Towa accuses Hountondji of falling into "epistemologist," meaning the belief that philosophy is a neutral and ethereal occupation that has no impact on society since it is only concerned with the pursuit of truth, a concept understood as having no connection to concrete, determined reality. This is essentially what Towa responds in 1979 to Jean Sablé, but especially to Manga Bihina, who "regrets" the lack of "a distinction, which, in [his] opinion, is crucial, between philosophy and ideology," meaning "between a free and disinterested search for truth and the representation of a supposed reality." According to Manga Bihina, "there is a difference here that is not merely a detail," before noting that "one must truly be an acrobat to follow [Towa] in the identification you dare to establish between philosophy and ideology."

== Works ==
=== Books (in chronological order) ===
- Essai sur la problématique philosophique dans l'Afrique actuelle, Yaoundé, Clé, Points de vue series, 1971, 77 pages
- Léopold Sédar Senghor : Négritude ou Servitude ?, Yaoundé, Clé, Point de vue series, 1971, 115 pages
- The Idea of a Negro-African Philosophy, Yaoundé, Clé, 1979, Point de vue series, 118 pages
- Poetry of Negritude: A Structuralist Approach, Sherbrooke, Namaan, Theses or Research series, 1983, 314 pages
- Cultural Values and Development, followed by Proof Through Behavior, Yaoundé, AMA-CENC, 2001, 83 pages
- Identity and Transcendence, Paris, L'Harmattan, African Problematics series, 2011, 348 pages
- History of African Thought, Yaoundé, Clé, 2015, 228 pages (posthumous)
