= Lekié =

- Department
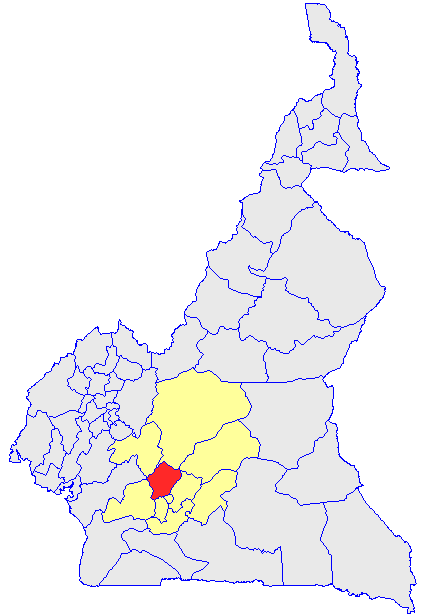
- Department location in Cameroon
- Country: Cameroon
- Province: Centre Province
- Capital: Monatele

Area
  - Total: 1,154 sq mi (2,989 km^{2})

Population (2001)
  - Total: 354,864
- Time zone: UTC+1 (WAT)

Lekié is a department of Centre Region in Cameroon. The department covers an area of 2,989 km^{2} and as of 2001 had a total population of 354,864. The capital of the department lies at Monatélé.

It is named after the Lekié River.

== Subdivisions ==
The department is divided administratively into nine communes and in turn into villages.

=== Communes ===
- Batchenga
- Ebebda
- Elig-Mfomo
- Evodoula
- Lobo
- Monatélé
- Obala
- Okola
- Sa'a
