= Renaissance FC de Ngoumou =

Association football club in Cameroon

Renaissance FC
- Full name: Renaissance Football Club de Ngoumou
- Nickname: RFC
- Founded: 2 January 2000; 26 years ago
- Ground: Stade Municipal de Ngoumou
- Capacity: 5,000
- Chairman: Michel Abena
- Manager: Ali Nikbakht
- League: Elite One
| Home colours | Away colours |

Renaissance FC de Ngoumou is a Cameroonian association football club based in the city of Ngoumou, 60 km from Yaoundé.

The club is chaired by Michel Abena.

The first team is coached by former Cameroon international Thomas Libiih, and currently plays in the MTN Elite One since 2002.

== History ==
Renaissance FC de Ngoumou was founded on 2 January 2000 by the Development Committee Nkong-Abok, in a village located 24 km from the city of Ngoumou and 60 km from Yaoundé, the capital of Cameroon. Since its inception, it has been affiliated with the Cameroonian Football Federation. It started playing in the county league championship in its region of origin, the Department of Méfou-et-Akono.

During the 2000 season, the team participated in the playoffs for the first time. After 6 wins in 6 games in the league of the department Méfou-et-Akono, they accessed the Inter-league tournament 2000, a competition involving the champions of the various leagues in the region. At the end of the tournament, Renaissance FC de Ngoumou ranked among the best teams in the Central Region with 2 wins, 1 draw and 1 defeat in 4 games. This opened the doors of the regional championship.

Having achieved the feat of reaching, respectively 1/16 and 1/8 finals of the Cameroonian Cup in 2001 and 2002 before being eliminated, Renaissance FC de Ngoumou won the right with satisfactory results after 2 years in the regional championship to represent the Central Region in the 2002 Tournoi Inter-poules. After which, Renaissance Football Club joined the elite of Cameroonian football through its rise in first division football to today's MTN Elite One status.
