= Kousse =

- Village
- Location in Cameroon
- Coordinates: 4.4500°N 11.5667°E
- Country: Cameroon
- Region: Centre Region
- Department: Mbam-et-Kim
- Commune: Ntui
- Elevation: 508 m (1,667 ft)

Population (2005)
  - Total: 1,321
- Time zone: UTC+1 (WAT)

Kousse (also spelled Koussé or Kouse) is a village in Cameroon located in the Centre Region and the Mbam-et-Kim Department. It is part of the commune of Ntui.

== Population ==
In 1965 the village had 958 inhabitants, mainly Batschenga.

The 2005 census recorded 1,321 residents.

The local language is Tuki (also called Batsenga), a southern Bantoid language.

== Sources ==
- Dictionnaire des villages du Mbam, ORSTOM, Yaoundé, May 1966, 62 pp. Read online
