= Lisette Claudia Tame =

Cameroonian businesswoman

- Born: Lisette Claudia Tame Njambe
- Occupation: Businesswoman
- Known for: Cocoa processing
- Title: Managing director of Africa Processing Company
- Father: Henri Tame Soumedjong

Lisette Claudia Tame Njambe is a Cameroonian businesswoman in the cocoa processing industry.

She is the founder and managing director of Africa Processing Company SA, which operates a cocoa grinding plant in Mbankomo, Centre Region.

== Biography ==
=== Early life and beginnings ===
Tame Njambe is from Cameroon. She is the daughter of the Cameroonian industrialist and politician Henri Tame Soumedjong (1936–2021). In 2017, she was director of a trading company, African Company of Trading Act.

=== Career ===
She founded Africa Processing Company in 2021.

On 15 January 2025, the company's cocoa processing plant in Mbankomo was inaugurated by the interim Minister of Mines, Industry and Technological Development, Fuh Calistus Gentry. The plant can process about 8,000 tonnes a year (around 4,000 tonnes of cocoa beans and as much in semi-finished products), and employs 61 people directly and 247 indirectly. According to Tame, it is the only plant of its kind in the Centre Region, which produces over half of Cameroon's cocoa; the company reports an annual turnover of more than 1.7 billion CFA francs. It competes with established processors such as SIC Cacaos (Barry Callebaut), Neo Industry and Atlantic Cocoa. A larger grinding unit with a capacity of 24,000 tonnes is planned for 2028–2029.
