= Blanche Bilongo =

Cameroonian actress

- Born: January 26, 1974 (age 52); Monatélé
- Education: University of Yaoundé II
- Occupations: Actress, screenwriter, presenter, film editor
- Years active: 2000-present

Blanche Bilongo (born 26 January 1974) is a Cameroonian actress, screenwriter, presenter, and film editor.

== Biography ==
Bilongo is from the Centre Region of Cameroon. She attended Johnson college in Yaoundé and performed ballet. In 1987, she began attending rehearsals for André Bang's Les Pagayeurs theater troupe and memorized lines for the main female role. One day, when the lead actress was not present, Bilongo took her place and her performance convinced everyone. Bilongo subsequently joined the troupe.

Bilongo made her film debut in 2000, in Tiga, L'Héritage. In 2005, Bilongo starred as Sabine on the soap opera N’taphil. In 2007, she played Pam in Hélène Patricia Ebah's film Les Blessures Inguérissables. Her character deals with the disappearance of her husband and realizes that her life has been a lie. She became an editor for the television channel CRTV in 2009.

Bilongo was named a Knight of the Order of Valor in May 2015, following the proposal of the Minister of Arts and Culture Narcisse Mouelle Kombi. In 2019, Bilongo released her first single, "Le temps de Dieu". It was sung in the Beti language and was dedicated to her late mother. In 2020, she starred as Marie Young in the romantic comedy Coup de Foudre à Yaoundé.

== Filmography ==
- 2000 : Tiga, L'Héritage
- 2006 : Mon Ayon : Eda
- 2006 : Enfant Peau Rouge : the Queen
- 2007 : Les Blessures Inguérissables : Pam
- 2010 : Les Bantous vont au Cinéma
- 2011 : Deuxième Bureau
- 2020 : Coup de Foudre à Yaoundé : Marie Young
