= Ngoro =

Coordinates: 4.9500°N 11.3833°E

- Commune and town
- Interactive map of Ngoro
- Country: Cameroon
- Time zone: UTC+1 (WAT)

Ngoro is a town and commune in the Mbam-et-Kim department of Centre Region in Cameroon.

== See also ==
- Communes of Cameroon
