= Yoko, Cameroon =

Coordinates: 5.592376°N 12.315755°E

Yoko
- Commune and town
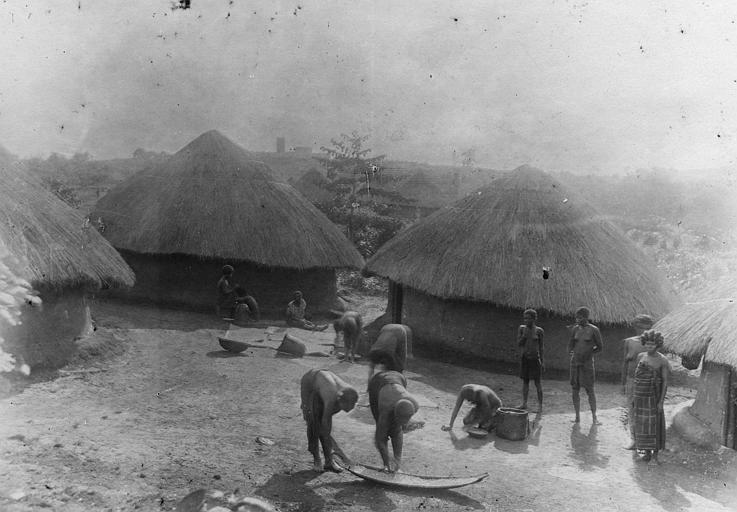
- Interactive map of Yoko
- Country: Cameroon

Population (2017)
  - Total: 12,332
- Time zone: UTC+1 (WAT)

Yoko is a town and commune in the Mbam-et-Kim department of Centre Region in Cameroon.

== Climate ==
Climate data for Yoko (1961–1990 normals)
Month	Jan	Feb	Mar	Apr	May	Jun	Jul	Aug	Sep	Oct	Nov	Dec	Year
Mean daily maximum °C (°F)	29.7 (85.5)	31.2 (88.2)	30.0 (86.0)	28.3 (82.9)	27.1 (80.8)	26.0 (78.8)	27.2 (81.0)	24.9 (76.8)	25.6 (78.1)	26.4 (79.5)	27.7 (81.9)	28.7 (83.7)	27.7 (81.9)
Daily mean °C (°F)	24.0 (75.2)	24.9 (76.8)	24.6 (76.3)	23.5 (74.3)	22.7 (72.9)	21.9 (71.4)	21.2 (70.2)	21.3 (70.3)	21.5 (70.7)	21.9 (71.4)	23.0 (73.4)	23.3 (73.9)	22.8 (73.1)
Mean daily minimum °C (°F)	18.2 (64.8)	19.2 (66.6)	19.1 (66.4)	18.8 (65.8)	18.3 (64.9)	17.7 (63.9)	17.6 (63.7)	17.6 (63.7)	17.3 (63.1)	17.5 (63.5)	18.3 (64.9)	18.0 (64.4)	18.1 (64.6)
Average precipitation mm (inches)	4.0 (0.16)	15.8 (0.62)	74.1 (2.92)	107.4 (4.23)	209.7 (8.26)	159.8 (6.29)	190.2 (7.49)	200.8 (7.91)	301.8 (11.88)	292.1 (11.50)	53.2 (2.09)	7.1 (0.28)	1,616 (63.63)
Average precipitation days (≥ 1.0 mm)	1	2	8	12	17	16	18	21	23	24	6	1	149
Mean monthly sunshine hours	256.6	179.0	209.0	202.0	215.7	181.0	125.7	117.4	142.4	189.3	247.9	260.1	2,326.1
Source: NOAA

== See also ==
- Communes of Cameroon
- List of municipalities of Cameroon
