= Bilongo =

Bilongo is a surname of Central African origin. Notable people with the surname include:

- Blanche Bilongo (born 1974), Cameroonian actress, screenwriter, presenter, and film editor
- Bryant Bilongo (born 2001), English footballer
