= Ebebda =

Coordinates: 4.3333°N 11.2667°E

- Commune and town
- Interactive map of Ebebda
- Country: Cameroon
- Region: Centre Region
- Time zone: UTC+1 (WAT)

Ebebda is a town and commune in Cameroon.

== See also ==
- Communes of Cameroon
