= Méfou-et-Akono =

Mefou-et-Akono
- Department
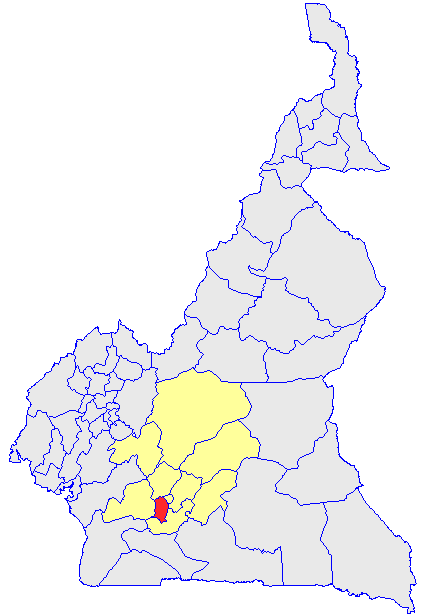
- Department location in Cameroon

- Location within Cameroon Location within Africa
- Coordinates: 3.5863°N 11.3705°E
- Country: Cameroon
- Province: Centre Province
- Capital: Ngoumou

Area
  - Total: 513 sq mi (1,329 km^{2})

Population (2001)
  - Total: 57,051
- Time zone: UTC+1 (WAT)

Mefou-et-Akono is a department of Centre Province in Cameroon. The department covers an area of 1,329 square kilometres (513 mi^{2}) and, as of 2001, had a total population of 57,051. The capital of the department lies at Ngoumou.

== Subdivisions ==
The department is divided administratively into four communes and in turn into villages.

=== Communes ===
- Akono
- Bikok
- Mbankomo
- Ngoumou
