= Mfoundi =

Mfoundi - Yaounde
- Department
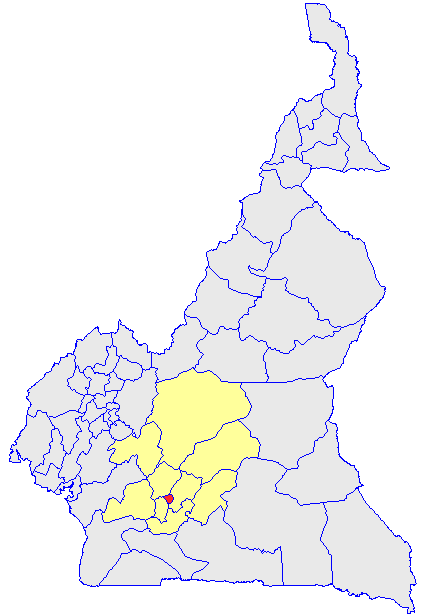
- Department location in Cameroon

- Location within Cameroon Location within Africa
- Country: Cameroon
- Region: Centre
- Capital: Yaoundé

Area
  - Total: 115 sq mi (297 km^{2})

Population (2005)
  - Total: 1,881,876; 2,091,171 (est. 2,010)
- Time zone: UTC+1 (WAT)

Mfoundi - Yaounde is a department of Centre Province in Cameroon.

The department covers an area of 297 km^{2} and as of 2005 had a total population of 1,881,876. The department forms the Yaoundé capital and greater area.

== See also ==
- Yaoundé (in French)
