= Ntui =

- Commune and town
- Location in Cameroon
- Coordinates: 4°27′N 11°38′E
- Country: Cameroon
- Region: Centre
- Department: Mbam-et-Kim

Area
  - Total: 170 sq mi (430 km^{2})

Population (2017)
  - Total: 2,800
- Time zone: UTC+1 (WAT)

Ntui is a commune and the capital town of Mbam-et-Kim division of Centre Region in Cameroon.

The commune is along the Sanaga River, and includes the villages of Kousse and Nachtigal.

== See also ==
- Subdivisions of Cameroon
