= Akono =

Coordinates: 3°29′59″N 11°19′36″E

- Commune and town
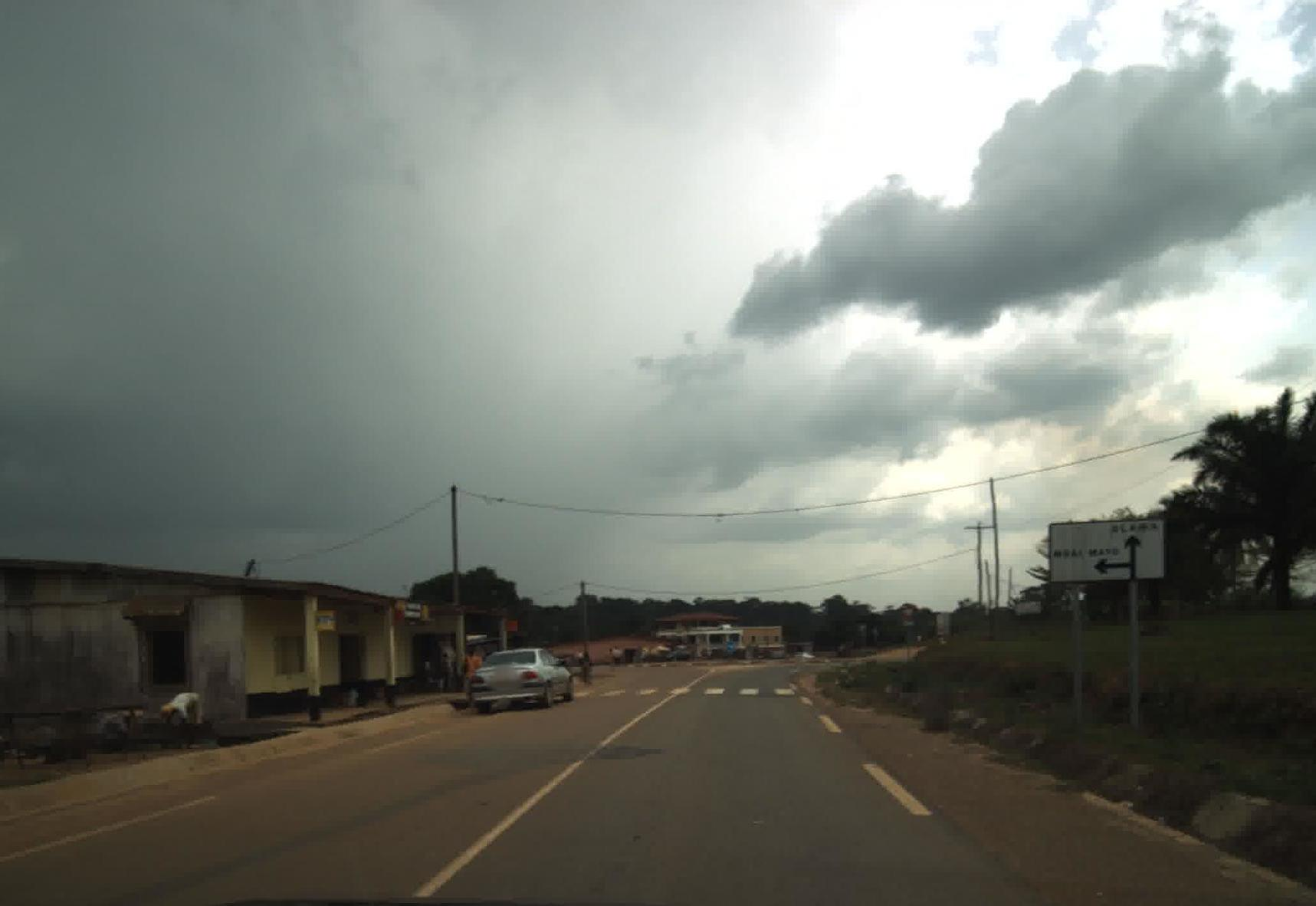
- View of P8 highway in Akono
- Interactive map of Akono
- Country: Cameroon
- Region: Centre
- Department: Méfou-et-Akono

Population (2005)
  - Total: 8,511
- Time zone: UTC+1 (WAT)

Akono is a town and commune in the Méfou-et-Afamba department, Centre Region of Cameroon. As of 2005 census, it had a population of 8,511.

== See also ==
- Communes of Cameroon
