= André Onana =

Cameroonian footballer (born 1996)

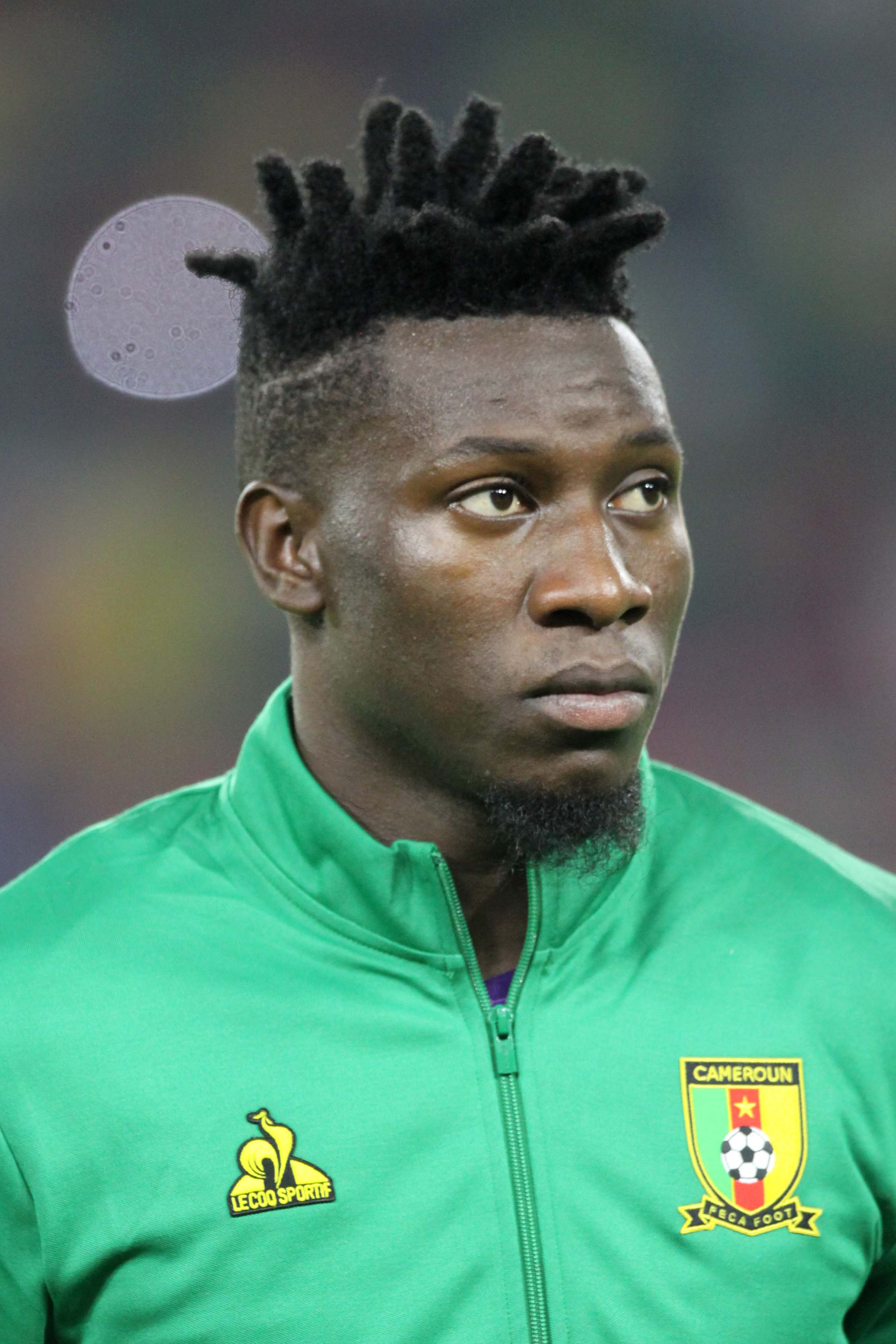
- Onana with Cameroon in 2022

Personal information
- Full name: André Onana Onana
- Date of birth: 2 April 1996 (age 30)
- Place of birth: Nkol Ngok, Cameroon
- Height: 1.90 m (6 ft 3 in)
- Position: Goalkeeper

Team information
- Current team: Trabzonspor (on loan from Manchester United)
- Number: 24

Youth career
- –2010: Samuel Eto'o Academy
- 2010–2015: Barcelona
- 2012–2013: → Cornellà (loan)
- 2013–2014: → Vista Alegre (loan)

Senior career*
Years	Team	Apps	(Gls)
2015–2016	Jong Ajax	39	(0)
2016–2022	Ajax	148	(0)
2022–2023	Inter Milan	24	(0)
2023–	Manchester United	72	(0)
2025–2026	→ Trabzonspor (loan)	29	(0)
2026–	→ Trabzonspor (loan)	6	(0)

International career^{‡}
2016–	Cameroon	53	(0)
Medal record
Men's football
Representing Cameroon
Africa Cup of Nations
Third place	2021 Cameroon
- * Club domestic league appearances and goals as of 19:13, 19 September 2026 (UTC) ‡ National team caps and goals as of 23:37, 13 November 2025 (UTC)

André Onana Onana (French pronunciation: [ɑ̃dʁe ɔnana]; born 2 April 1996) is a Cameroonian professional footballer who plays as a goalkeeper for Süper Lig club Trabzonspor, on loan from Premier League club Manchester United, and the Cameroon national team.

Onana joined Barcelona's youth system in 2010. He signed for Ajax in 2015, where he made 214 appearances and won three Eredivisie titles. Onana joined Inter Milan on a free transfer in July 2022, winning a Coppa Italia and Supercoppa Italiana title in his sole season at the club, also reaching the Champions League final. Manchester United then signed Onana for an initial £43.8 million in 2023.

At international level, Onana has made more than 50 appearances for the Cameroon national team since making his debut in September 2016.

== Club career ==
=== Youth career ===
Born in Nkol Ngok, Onana joined Barcelona from the Samuel Eto'o Academy at the age of 14 in 2010. Because he was under 18 and a non-EU citizen, Onana had to go on loan in the 2012–13 season to the youth team of Cornellà, before being loaned again the next season to the first-team of Vista Alegre.

=== Ajax ===
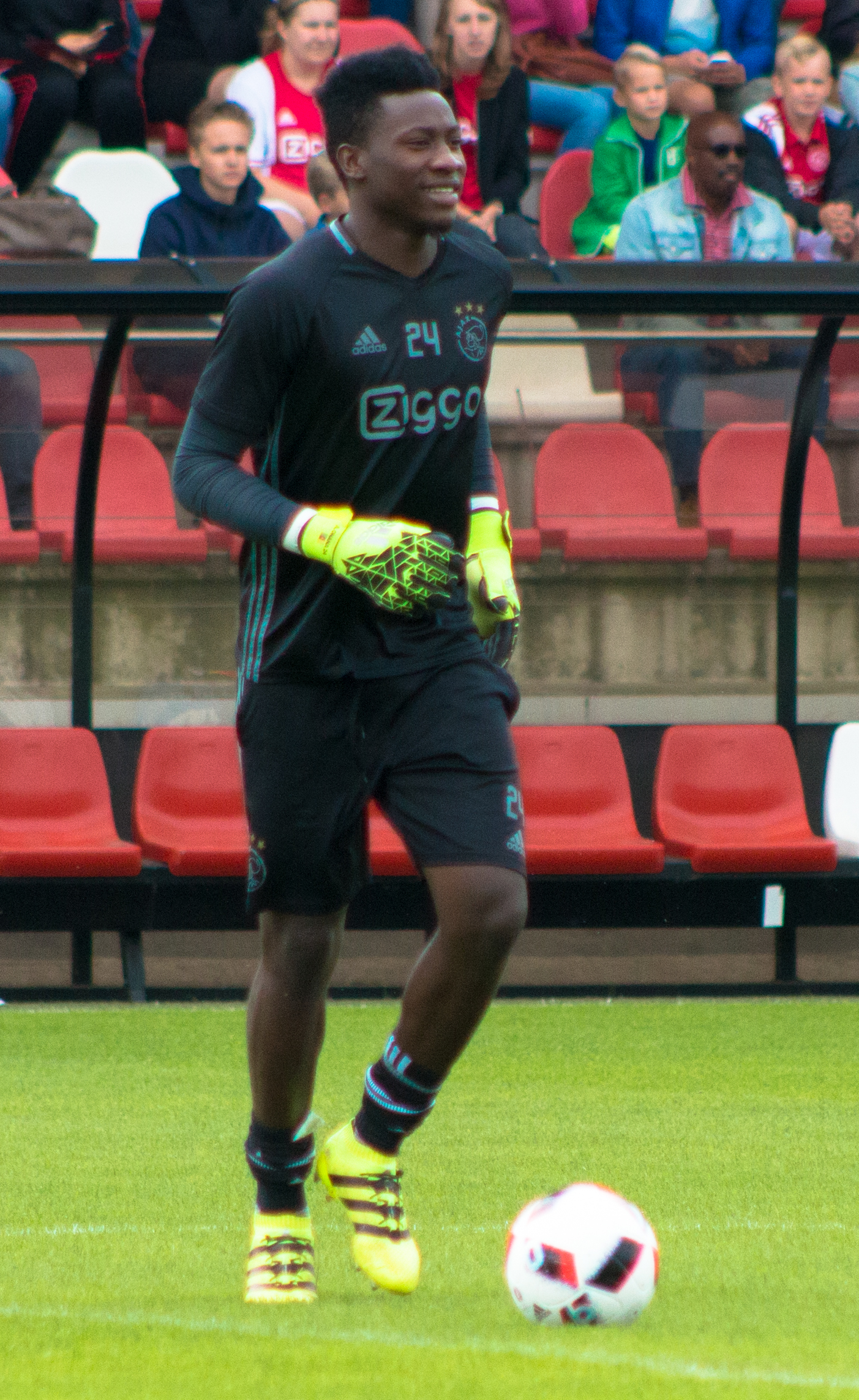
Onana with Ajax in 2016

In early January 2015, it was announced that he would join Dutch club Ajax in July 2015. The transfer was brought forward later that month. He made his debut for Jong Ajax in the Eerste Divisie in February 2015. He signed a new contract with Ajax in May 2017, running until 2021. In March 2019 he signed a further new contract, until June 2022. In November 2019, he said he was interested in playing in the Premier League in England.

In February 2021, Onana was banned from playing for 12 months by UEFA after testing positive for furosemide, a banned substance. Onana said he took his wife's medicine by mistake and Ajax joined him in appealing against the decision. The ban was reduced to nine months by the Court of Arbitration for Sport later in June.

In January 2022, he was linked with a transfer to Italian club Inter Milan. In May 2022, he announced that he was leaving Ajax. Onana spent seven and a half years with Ajax, making 214 appearances in all competitions during his stint.

=== Inter Milan ===
On 1 July 2022, Inter Milan officially confirmed Onana's signing on a free transfer on a five-year contract.

In January 2023, he won the Supercoppa Italiana against rivals AC Milan, and also went on to win the Coppa Italia, defeating Fiorentina in May 2023. He played an integral role in helping guide Inter to the 2023 Champions League Final.

=== Manchester United ===
After discussions with the club through the month, on 16 July 2023 it was reported that Onana had agreed personal terms with Premier League club Manchester United for a five-year contract. Manchester United confirmed the transfer on 20 July, for an initial £43.8 million fee with Inter for the transfer of Onana, with a potential £3.4 million in add-ons, which saw Onana rejoin his former Ajax coach, Erik ten Hag.

Onana made his competitive debut for the club in the Premier League opener against Wolverhampton Wanderers on 14 August. He kept a clean sheet as United won the game 1–0, but was at the centre of controversy after referee Simon Hooper and VAR Michael Salisbury opted not to award a late penalty for a foul by Onana on Saša Kalajdžić. On 20 September, following a 4–3 defeat against Bayern Munich in the Champions League opening fixture, Onana said he had "let the team down" following mistakes during the match. He was then described by journalist Guillem Balagué as "not the perfect goalkeeper but good enough for Manchester United". Ten Hag later said that Onana should be inspired by Manchester United's legendary goalkeepers Peter Schmeichel and David de Gea.

On 24 October 2023, he saved a penalty in the 97th minute in a Champions League match which ended in a 1–0 victory against Copenhagen, leading to his club's first win in the competition that season.

A month later, Onana was heavily criticised for his performance in a 3–3 Champions League draw against Galatasaray; he was directly blamed for Galatasaray's first two goals, which came from former Ajax teammate Hakim Ziyech free kicks. The BBC called it "a night of suffering for Onana", who "produced a horror show to undermine much of United's good work", while the Manchester Evening News declared he "carelessly conceded" the first Galatasaray goal, "catastrophically fumbled" the second and "too easily beaten" for the third. He was defended by manager Erik ten Hag, who opined that Onana's stats showed him to be the second-best goalkeeper in the Premier League.

At the end of his first season, he said it had taken six months for him to "feel good". The season finished with Onana winning his first trophy with United, the FA Cup, beating Manchester City in the final.

During his second season, by December 2024 Onana had kept more clean sheets than any other Premier League goalkeeper, but was criticised for making mistakes against Nottingham Forest and Viktoria Plzeň.

In April 2025, ahead of a game between Lyon and Manchester United, former Manchester United and current Lyon player Nemanja Matic described Onana as "one of the worst goalkeepers in the club's history". Onana was considered to be at fault for both of Lyon's goals in a 2–2 draw, but was defended by manager Ruben Amorim. However, Amorim then dropped Onana for the club's next match.

Ahead of the 2025–26 season, Onana missed United's pre-season tour of the United States due to injury. After Altay Bayındır started in goal for United's first two Premier League matches, Onana made his season debut in the EFL Cup against EFL League Two side Grimsby Town. United were surprisingly beaten on penalties by the lower-league team, and Onana's performance was again criticised, with Richard Jolly of The Independent declaring Onana "the face of Manchester United's worst era".

==== Loans to Trabzonspor ====
In September 2025, it was reported that Onana was considering a loan move to Turkish club Trabzonspor. The move was completed on 11 September. Three days later, Onana made his debut for Trabzonspor against Fenerbahçe, conceding a goal to Youssef En-Nesyri just before half-time following a 20th-minute red card for Okay Yokuşlu, as Trabzonspor lost 1–0. On 22 May 2026, he started in Trabzonspor's 2–1 win over Konyaspor in the 2026 Turkish Cup final.

In June 2026, it was reported that Onana would return to Trabzonspor on loan for the 2026–27 season. On 3 July 2026, Onana rejoined Trabzonspor on loan for a second year.

== International career ==
Onana is a former Cameroon youth international. He was named in Cameroon's squad for a friendly against France in May 2016.

Onana debuted for Cameroon in a 2–1 friendly win over Gabon in September 2016. He featured in the 2021 Africa Cup of Nations third-place game against Burkina Faso. On 9 November 2022, he was named in the final squad for the 2022 FIFA World Cup in Qatar. He played the first match against Switzerland, before being dropped in the second against Serbia, then he was eventually sent home from the tournament on 28 November by manager Rigobert Song due to a disciplinary issue related to arguments about the latter's coaching tactics. Onana announced his retirement from international football on 23 December 2022.

Just over eight months later, on 29 August 2023, Onana was recalled into the Cameroon squad by Song for an Africa Cup of Nations qualification match against Burundi. The goalkeeper formally confirmed his return to international football several days later, on 4 September, via a message posted on social media, stating that, "in the face of manipulation, lies and abuse of power", he had chosen to "stay loyal to my principle, representing with pride a country that deserves our sincere commitment." Former player Patrick Suffo said that Onana's return did not mean that there were no "problems" between Onana and the coaching staff.

In December 2025, Onana was dropped from the Cameroon squad for the 2025 AFCON.

== Style of play ==
Onana is a sweeper-keeper who has strong distribution skills. He regularly comes out of his box to help build-up play and is known for his confidence on the ball and range of passing. In Cameroon's opening 2022 World Cup game against Switzerland, Onana had more touches of the ball outside of the box (26) than any goalkeeper in a World Cup match since records began in 1966. He was described as resembling a "holding midfielder at times" in UEFA's Technical Observers' report on the 2022–23 Champions League.

In July 2023, he was described as "a modern keeper... with the technique of an outfield player". In his prime, he was also known for his reflexes and shot-stopping ability, despite his large stature.

Despite his success with Ajax and Inter, during his time at Manchester United, however, Onana suffered a significant decline in form and a loss of confidence, which was in part attributed by certain pundits to the team's change in tactics, and a focus on long rather than short passing out from the back, leading to a series of errors from the goalkeeper. In April 2025, Nemanja Matić described Onana as "one of the worst goalkeepers in Manchester United history" as a result of his perceived poor performances. On 28 August 2025, following a shock defeat in the EFL Cup to Grimsby Town where Onana had committed a blunder that led to Grimsby Town's second goal and Manchester United's exit on penalties, former Manchester United goalkeeper Ben Foster commented: "For the last year especially, everyone knew that Onana wasn't up to it. He's a fantastic shot-stopper but he makes way too many mistakes."

== Personal life ==
Onana's older brother, Nnana Onana, is a former footballer, and played as a defender for Indonesian club Persikad Depok. His cousin, Fabrice Ondoa, also plays as a goalkeeper.

In May 2019, Onana spoke out about being a black goalkeeper, saying he had to work harder than his white counterparts due to misconceptions about black goalkeepers being more prone to making mistakes.

Onana is married to Melanie Kamayou and they have a son together.

== Career statistics ==
=== Club ===
As of match played 19 September 2026

Appearances and goals by club, season and competition
Club	Season	League			National cup (Note: Includes KNVB Cup, Coppa Italia, FA Cup, Turkish Cup)		League cup (Note: Includes EFL Cup)		Europe		Other		Total	
Club	Season	Division	Apps	Goals	Apps	Goals	Apps	Goals	Apps	Goals	Apps	Goals	Apps	Goals
Jong Ajax	2014–15	Eerste Divisie	13	0	—		—		—		—		13	0
Jong Ajax	2015–16	Eerste Divisie	24	0	—		—		—		—		24	0
Jong Ajax	2016–17	Eerste Divisie	2	0	—		—		—		—		2	0
Jong Ajax	Total		39	0	—		—		—		—		39	0
Ajax	2016–17	Eredivisie	32	0	0	0	—		14 (Note: Appearances in UEFA Europa League)	0	—		46	0
Ajax	2017–18	Eredivisie	33	0	1	0	—		4 (Note: Two appearances in UEFA Champions League, two appearances in UEFA Europa League)	0	—		38	0
Ajax	2018–19	Eredivisie	33	0	4	0	—		18 (Note: Appearances in UEFA Champions League)	0	—		55	0
Ajax	2019–20	Eredivisie	24	0	3	0	—		11 (Note: Ten appearances in UEFA Champions League, one appearance in UEFA Europa League)	0	1 (Note: Appearance in Johan Cruyff Shield)	0	39	0
Ajax	2020–21	Eredivisie	20	0	0	0	—		6	0	—		26	0
Ajax	2021–22	Eredivisie	6	0	2	0	—		2	0	0	0	10	0
Ajax	Total		148	0	10	0	0	0	55	0	1	0	214	0
Inter Milan	2022–23	Serie A	24	0	3	0	—		13	0	1 (Note: Appearance in Supercoppa Italiana)	0	41	0
Manchester United	2023–24	Premier League	38	0	5	0	2	0	6	0	—		51	0
Manchester United	2024–25	Premier League	34	0	2	0	0	0	13	0	1 (Note: Appearance in FA Community Shield)	0	50	0
Manchester United	2025–26	Premier League	0	0	0	0	1	0	—		—		1	0
Manchester United	2026–27	Premier League	0	0	0	0	0	0	—		—		0	0
Manchester United	Total		72	0	7	0	3	0	19	0	1	0	102	0
Trabzonspor (loan)	2025–26	Süper Lig	29	0	3	0	—		—		1 (Note: Appearance in Turkish Super Cup)	0	33	0
Trabzonspor (loan)	2026–27	Süper Lig	6	0	0	0	—		2	0	0	0	8	0
Career total			318	0	23	0	3	0	89	0	4	0	437	0

=== International ===
As of match played 13 November 2025

Appearances and goals by national team and year
National team	Year	Apps	Goals
Cameroon	2016	1	0
Cameroon	2017	1	0
Cameroon	2018	6	0
Cameroon	2019	8	0
Cameroon	2020	2	0
Cameroon	2021	2	0
Cameroon	2022	14	0
Cameroon	2023	3	0
Cameroon	2024	9	0
Cameroon	2025	7	0
Total		53	0

== Honours ==
Ajax

- Eredivisie: 2018–19, 2020–21, 2021–22
- KNVB Cup: 2018–19, 2020–21
- Johan Cruyff Shield: 2019
- UEFA Europa League runner-up: 2016–17

Inter Milan

- Coppa Italia: 2022–23
- Supercoppa Italiana: 2022
- UEFA Champions League runner-up: 2022–23

Manchester United

- FA Cup: 2023–24
- UEFA Europa League runner-up: 2024–25

Trabzonspor

- Turkish Cup: 2025–26

Cameroon

- Africa Cup of Nations third place: 2021

Individual

- Indomitable Lion of the Year (Cameroonian footballer of the year): 2018
- Best African Goalkeeper: 2018
- Eredivisie Team of the Year: 2018–19
- CAF Team of the Year: 2019, 2023, 2024
- IFFHS CAF Men Team of The Year: 2020
- Premier League Save of the Month: April 2024, September 2024, November 2024
