= Evodoula =

Coordinates: 4°05′N 11°12′E

- Commune and town
- Interactive map of Evodoula
- Country: Cameroon
- Region: Centre Region
- Time zone: UTC+1 (WAT)

Evodoula is a town and commune in Cameroon.

== See also ==
- Communes of Cameroon
