= Mbankomo =

- Commune and town
- Interactive map of Mbankomo
- Coordinates: 3.790085°N 11.399369°E
- Country: Cameroon
- Region: Centre Region
- Department: Méfou-et-Akono
- Time zone: UTC+1 (WAT)

Mbankomo is a municipality, located in the Centre Region (Cameroon) and about 25km southwest of Yaoundé. It is also a district of the department of Méfou-et-Akono. Mbankomo is home to the Mbankomo Academic Sports Center. Mbankomo is the birthplace of professional football goalkeeper André Onana of Trabzonspor, who is currently on loan from Manchester United.

== See also ==
- Communes of Cameroon
