= Elig-Mfomo =

Coordinates: 4.6298°N 11.7068°E

- Commune and town
- Interactive map of Elig-Mfomo
- Country: Cameroon
- Region: Centre Region
- Time zone: UTC+1 (WAT)

Elig-Mfomo is a town and commune in Cameroon.

== See also ==
- Communes of Cameroon
