= Monatélé =

- Commune and town
- Location in Cameroon
- Coordinates: 4°16′N 11°12′E
- Country: Cameroon
- Region: Centre
- Department: Lekié
- Elevation: 1,080 ft (330 m)

Population (2005)
  - Total: 36,933
- Time zone: UTC+1 (WAT)

Monatélé is a town and commune in Cameroon and capital of the Lekié Department of the Centre Region. It is composed of many villages.

According to the 2005 census, the commune had a population of 36,933, including 10,324 in the town of Monatélé.

The sprinter Irene Bell Bonong is from Monatélé.

== See also ==
- Communes of Cameroon
