= Jean-Godefroy Bidima =

Cameroonian philosopher

Jean-Godefroy Bidima (born 1958 in Mfoumassi) is a Cameroonian philosopher, currently living in the United States. Bidima is the former director of the program at the International College of Philosophy in Paris and as of 2015 is a professor in French and Italian and Yvonne Arnoult Chair in Francophone Studies at Tulane University in New Orleans. His fields of interest are cited as " Continental philosophy, literatures and arts of the Francophone world, African philosophies, juridical anthropology and medical ethics". He is the author of numerous books and articles on African philosophy, including Histoire et traversée : philosophie, politique et l’imaginaire en Afrique, Philosophie negro-africaine (1995) and La palabre: une juridiction de la parole (1997).
