= Obala =

Town in Centre Province, Cameroon

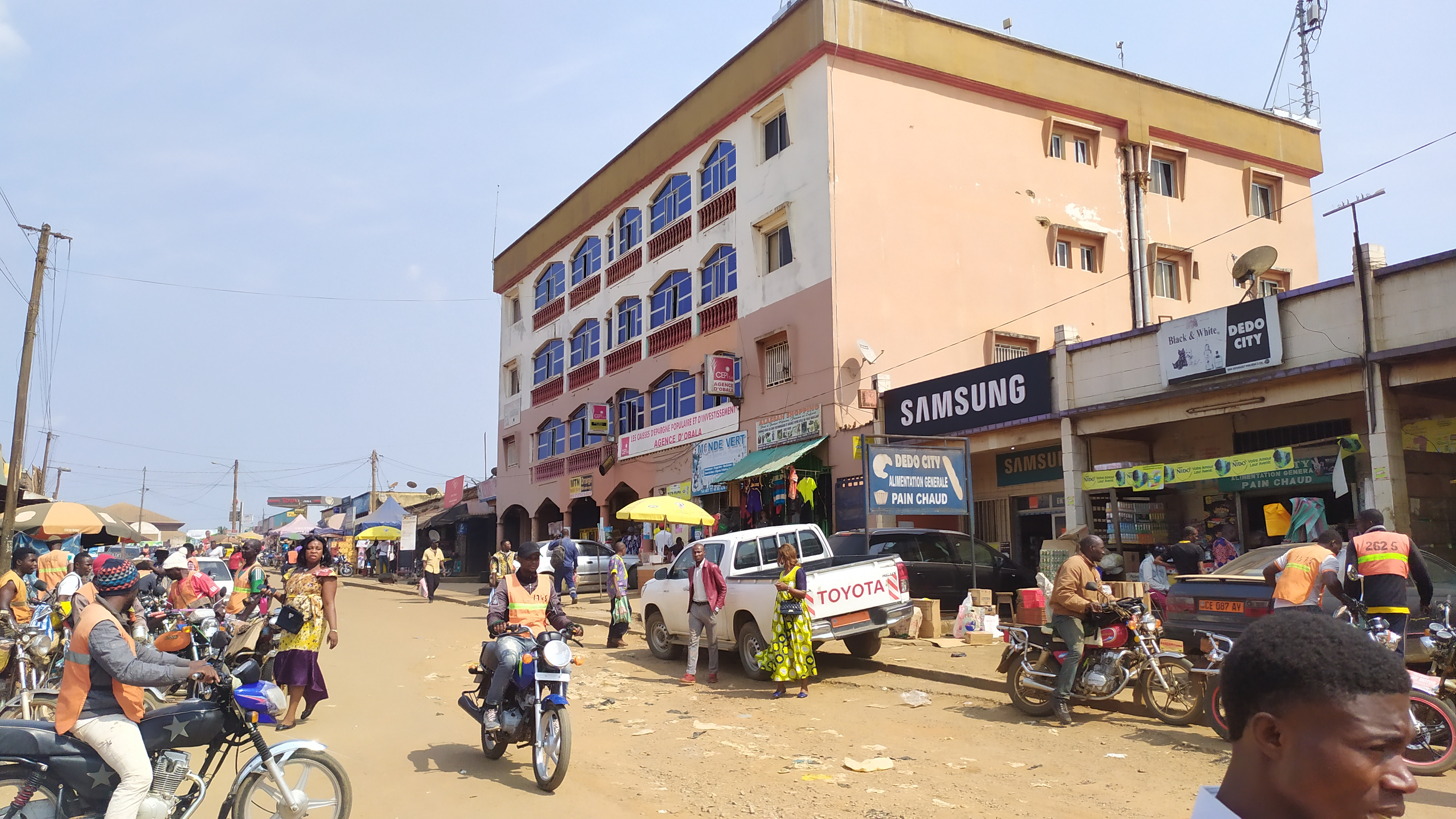
- Downtown Obala

- Location in Cameroon
- Coordinates: 4°10′N 11°32′E
- Country: Cameroon
- Province: Centre Province
- Division: Lekié
- Elevation: 539 m (1,768 ft)

Population (2012)
  - Total: 37,888

Obala is a town in Cameroon's Centre Province, ca 45 km north of Yaoundé, the capital of Cameroon.

== Overview ==
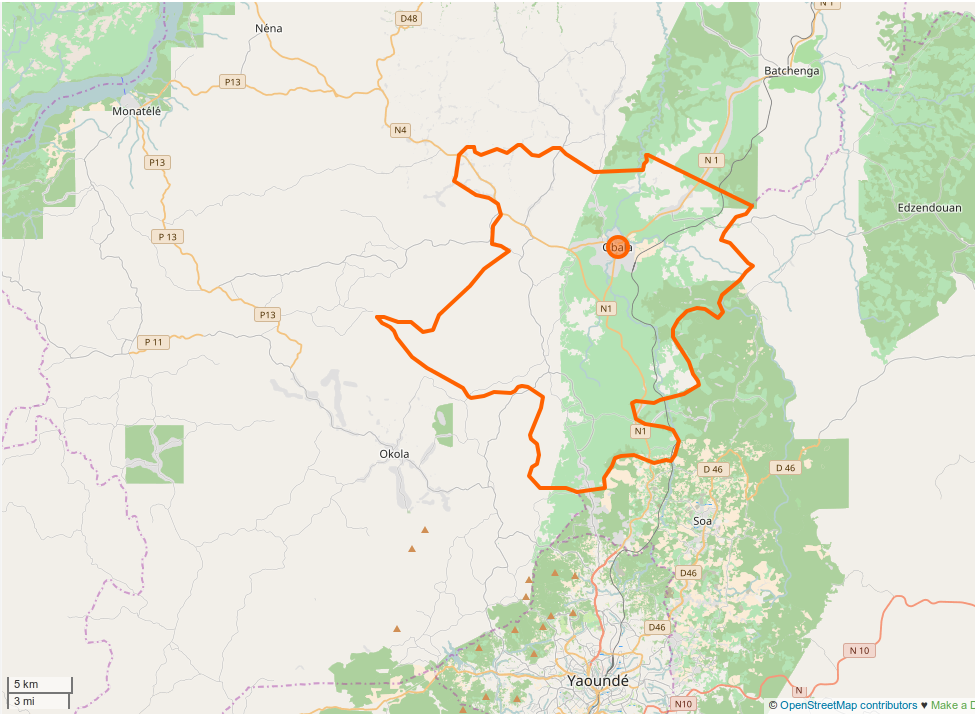
Obala in Cameroon ː city boundaries with OSM.

The town is the seat of a Roman Catholic diocese and hosts a military academy. Tourists in Obala may visit the somewhat derelict Luna Park whose main attraction is a swimming pool. Not far from Obala are the Nachtigal Falls, actually a series of rapids in the Sanaga River. It has one fairly nice hotel and a large open-air market. The town's football club is called 'Tarzan'. The language spoken is Eton, a Beti language.

Obala is a center for cocoa farming. The town is home to several internationally owned cocoa processing plants. In 2024, a chocolate factory began construction.

== See also ==
- Communes of Cameroon
