= Mbam-et-Kim =

- Department
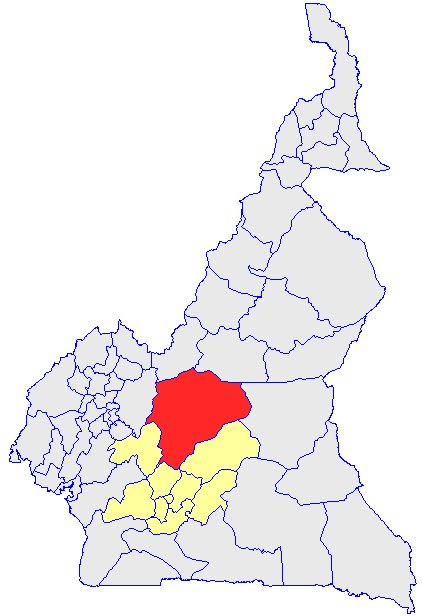
- Department location in Cameroon (yellow are other departments in Centre province)

- Location within Cameroon Location within Africa
- Coordinates: 5.4164°N 12.0964°E
- Country: Cameroon
- Province: Centre Province
- Capital: Ntui

Area
  - Total: 10,002 sq mi (25,906 km^{2})

Population (2001)
  - Total: 64,540
- Time zone: UTC+1 (WAT)

Mbam-et-Kim is a department of Centre Region in Cameroon. The department covers an area of 25,906 km^{2} and as of 2001 had a total population of 64,540. The capital of the department is Ntui.

== Subdivisions ==
The department is divided administratively into five communes and in turn into villages.

=== Communes ===
- Mbangassina
- Ngambè-Tikar
- Ngoro
- Ntui
- Yoko
