= Okola =

Coordinates: 4.0167°N 11.3667°E

- Commune and town
- Interactive map of Okola
- Country: Cameroon
- Time zone: UTC+1 (WAT)

Okola is a town and commune in Cameroon with a population of around 5,390. It is located 40 kilometres (25 mi) from the capital Yaoundé, sitting at an elevation of 689 metres (2,260 ft). The Mount Mbam minkom is 2,084 km (1,295 mi) west-northwest of Okola. The nearest river is the Lekie.

== See also ==
- Communes of Cameroon
