= Batchenga =

Coordinates: 4°17′N 11°39′E

- Commune and town
- Interactive map of Batchenga
- Country: Cameroon
- Time zone: UTC+1 (WAT)

Batchenga is a town and commune in Cameroon.

== See also ==
- Communes of Cameroon
