= Ngoumou =

Town in Centre Region, Cameroon

Coordinates: 4°12′N 12°55′E

- Commune and town
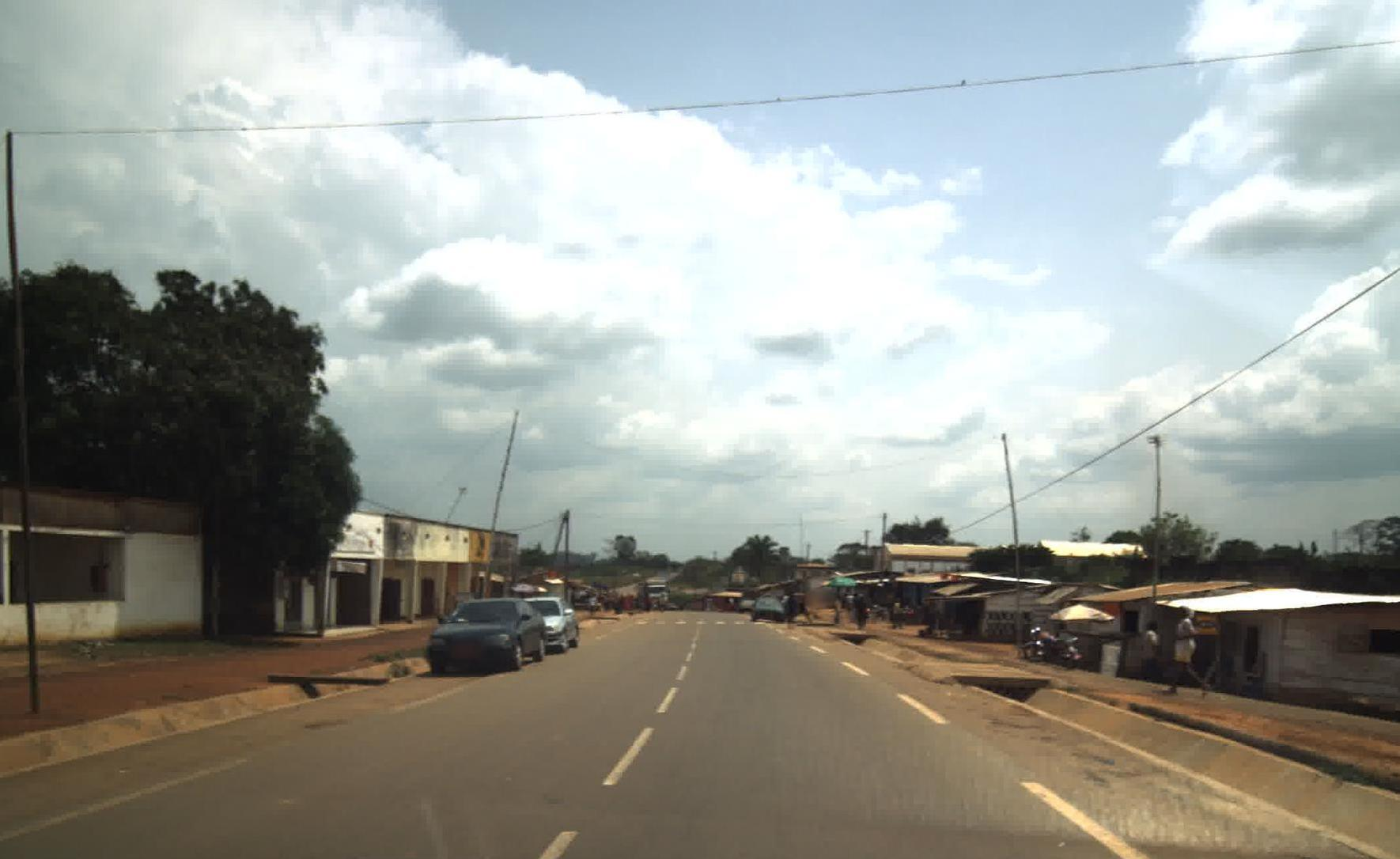
- View of P8 highway in Ngoumou
- Interactive map of Ngoumou
- Country: Cameroon
- Region: Centre Region
- Time zone: UTC+1 (WAT)

Ngoumou is a town and commune in Cameroon. It is known for being the death place of Jean-Claude Roger Mbede.

== See also ==
- Communes of Cameroon
