= Centre Region (Cameroon) =

Region of Cameroon

Centre Region Région du Centre
- Region of Cameroon
- Location of Centre Province within Cameroon
- Coordinates: 4°45′N 12°00′E
- Country: Cameroon
- Capital: Yaoundé
- Divisions: Haute-Sanaga, Lekié, Mbam-et-Inoubou, Mbam-et-Kim, Méfou-et-Afamba, Méfou-et-Akono, Mfoundi, Nyong-et-Kéllé, Nyong-et-Mfoumou, Nyong-et-So'o

Government
  - Governor: Eyene Roger Nlom

Area
  - Total: 68,953 km^{2} (26,623 sq mi)

Population (2015 Projection)
  - Total: 4,159,500
  - Density: 60.324/km^{2} (156.24/sq mi)
- Time zone: UTC+01:00 (WAT)
- HDI (2022): 0.668 medium · 3rd of 10

The Centre Region (French: région du Centre) occupies 69,000 km^{2} of the central plains of the Republic of Cameroon. It is bordered to the north by the Adamawa Region, to the south by the South Region, to the east by the East Region, and to the West by the Littoral and West Regions. It is the second largest (after East Region) of Cameroon's regions in land area. Major ethnic groups include the Bassa, Ewondo, and Vute.

Yaoundé, capital of Cameroon, is at the heart of the Centre, drawing people from the rest of the country to live and work there. The Centre's towns are also important industrial centres, especially for timber. Agriculture is another important economic factor, especially with regard to the province's most important cash crop, cocoa. Outside of the capital and the plantation zones, most inhabitants are sustenance farmers.

== 2008 presidential decree abolishes provinces ==
In 2008, the President of the Republic of Cameroon, President Paul Biya signed decrees abolishing "Provinces" and replacing them with "Regions". Hence, all of the country's ten provinces are now known as Regions.

== Geography ==
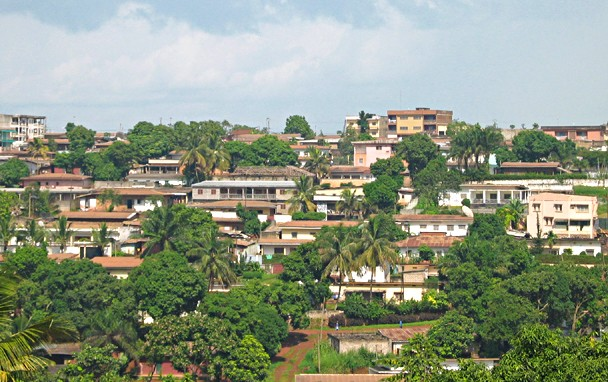
View of Yaoundé, the capital city of Cameroon

=== Land ===
The Centre's soil is primarily composed of Precambrian deposits of metamorphic rocks, such as gneiss, mica, migmatites, and schists. Granite dominates from about 4˚ N and to the Adamawa border. Faults along the border with the South Province have deposited metamorphic schists and quartzites, with some granite. Laterites are also common, caused by the decomposition of the crystalline rock.

Red ferrallitic soil dominates most of the province, including the forested zone and much of the savanna area. Though as deep as ten metres, this soil is leached by silica and percolating water, making it only marginally productive for agriculture. However, it is usable as a building material, and traditional houses in the province are made from red, sun-dried bricks of mud. Toward the northern border, this soil becomes lightly evolved with large deposits of raw minerals, and at the confluence of the Sanaga and Mbam rivers, it is a mixture of several soil types.

=== Drainage ===
The Sanaga is the most important river in the province, as its many falls and rapids make it an important source of hydroelectric power. It also supports varied agriculture, as it is prone to flooding during the rainy season. It is navigable from Nachtigal Falls to Edéa in the Littoral Province.

Several smaller tributaries that drain the Centre's Mbam division form the Sanaga. The Djérem flows in from the Adamawa and then through the far northeast of the area before entering the East Province to join the Lom (the upper Sanaga). The Djérem, like the Sanaga, is also subject to seasonal flooding. The Kim flows in from the Adamawa and through the northwestern portion of the Mbam division before merging with the Mbam River at the border with the West Province. The Mbam then empties into the Noun. The Noun, which flows in from the West Province, passes through the town of Bafia, and receives the flow of the Ndjim River north of Goura. The Noun then joins the Sanaga northeast of Monatélé. The Nyong is the only major river in the province that does not flow into the Sanaga. It rises in the East Province, passes through Mbalmayo, continues west, then forms the border between the Littoral and South provinces.

Because the Nyong flows completely through an equatorial climate, it has one period of high water during the rainy season (March to October), during which it is navigable from Mbalmayo to Abong-Mbang in the East Province. Other Centre Province rivers flow through both equatorial and tropical climate zones where rainy seasons occur at different times, and so they never experience great fluctuations in water level. All Centre Province rivers empty into the Atlantic Ocean via the Littoral and South.

Most of the Centre's great demand for electricity is supplied from hydroelectric centres in neighbouring provinces. However, plans are in place for a dam on the Nyong at Njock-Mpoume and on the Sanaga at Nachtigal to better supply the region's power needs.

Most lakes in the Centre are manmade and located in the Yaoundé area. The majority of these were created during the colonial period for the pursuit of water sports.

=== Relief ===
The Centre Province is entirely situated on the South Cameroon Plateau. The land varies from 500 to 1000 metres above sea level except for the valleys of the Sanaga and its tributaries, which dip as low as 200 metres. The land rises gently in escarpments from the southwestern coastal plain before joining the Adamawa Plateau via depressions and granite massifs. The terrain is characterised by rolling, forested hills, the tallest of which have bare, rocky tops. Deep valleys separate these. The province's highest point is Mbam Minkom, northwest of Yaoundé, at 1,295 metres.

=== Climate ===
The Centre falls completely within a Type A or Guinea-type climate. This gives the region high humidity and precipitation, with rainfall averaging 1,000–2,000 mm each year. Precipitation is highest in the southernmost portions and diminishes toward the north. Temperatures are fairly steady, averaging 24˚ for the entire region except for the northwestern portions of Mbam division, where they fall to 23˚.

The Centre also experiences equatorial seasons, alternating between rainy and dry periods. The long dry season begins the year, running from December to May. After this comes the short rainy season, which lasts from May to June. The short dry season comes next, from July to October. The year ends in the long rainy season from October to November. North of 5˚, the dry periods last up to four months.

=== Plant and animal life ===
The Centre is forested except for the valleys of the Djérem, Mbam, and Noun rivers (most of the Mbam division) and the northern border region. These areas are woodland savanna and Sudano-Guinea savanna, respectively. The woodland savanna is characterised by large expanses of grass punctuated by small copses of trees from the forested zones farther south. The Sudano-Guinea portion is similar, only the grass grows more thinly, and trees are both evergreen and deciduous.

The region was once much more heavily forested, but exploitation of species such as ebony and iroko has thinned out the woodlands and allowed dense undergrowth to appear. This has also pushed the savanna farther south over time. Today there remains very little virgin land in the province. The Mfou Reserve (Réserve du Mfou) is one such area, recently created by the WWF and the GTZ to protect various bird, monkey, and snake species. Cameroonian wildlife also lives in the Mvog Betsi Zoo in Yaoundé.

In April 2019, 2 lions were discovered in Mpem and Djim National Park.

== Demographics ==
Historical population
Year	Pop.	±% p.a.
1976	1,176,743	—
1987	1,651,600	+3.13%
2005	3,098,044	+3.56%
2015	4,159,500	+2.99%

=== Settlement patterns ===
With a population of more than 4 million, the Centre is one of the more densely populated of Cameroon's provinces. The area has been an important population center for the Beti-Pahuin people for over a century, but it has since experienced a great amount of immigration due to the placement of Cameroon's seat of government there in colonial times. Yaoundé's presence has prompted the construction of a large and well-maintained road system, and this has contributed to the area's boom. Another factor in the area's growth is its multiple plantations, particularly in the cocoa-growing centre between the Sanaga and Nyong rivers and the sugar-cane area of Mbandjock, which draw thousands of migrant workers, mostly from the highly populated West and Littoral Provinces. As an important educational and government centre, Yaoundé also draws many more highly educated migrants.

The majority of the Centre's residents live in the city of Yaoundé (population 1.1 million) or along the roads and in the major towns. The population density thins out away from the major thoroughfares, especially in the Mbam and Upper Sanaga divisions. A few isolated settlements, such as Nanga Eboko, also support a larger population.

Settlements in the Centre are traditionally placed along roads, resulting in large numbers of houses near the road with forest beginning directly behind them. The traditional house is a rectangular structure made of mud bricks and thin posts. Roofs are sometimes made of thatched raffia palm, but they are more often of corrugated aluminium, iron, or tin today.

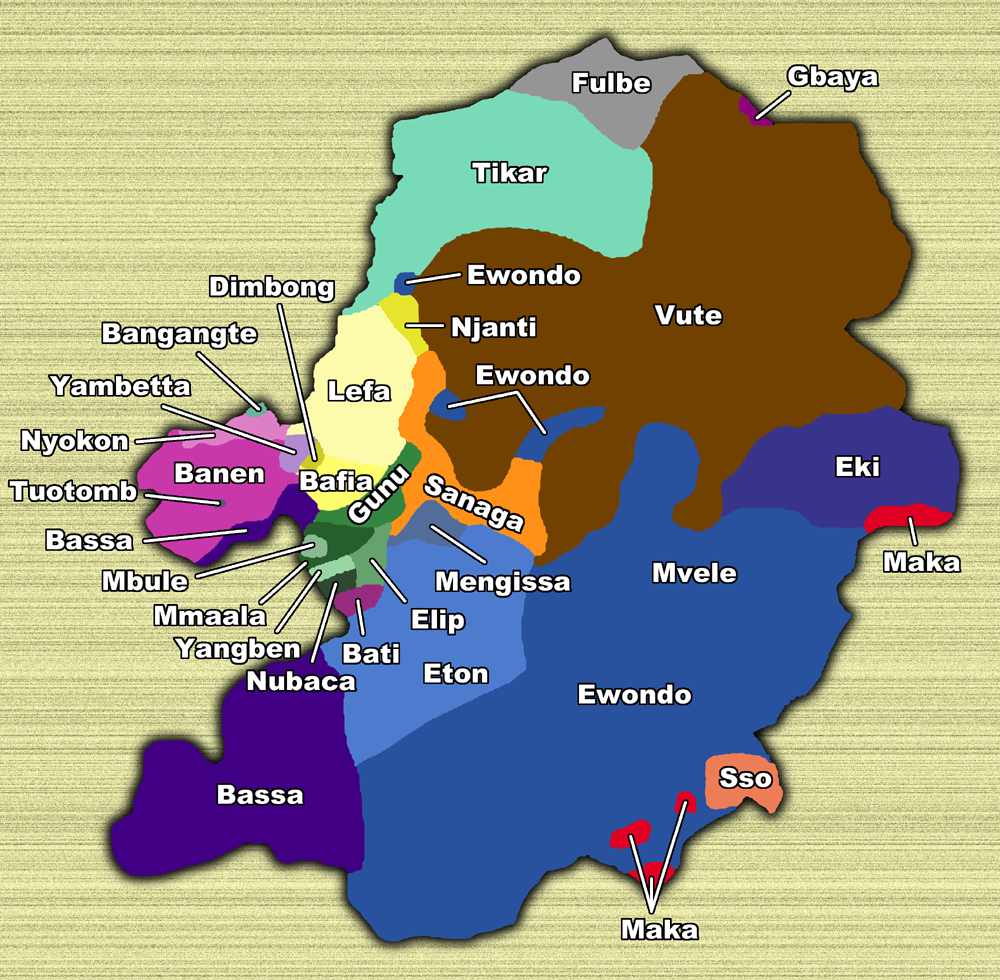
Territories of ethnic groups in the Centre Province

=== People ===
The Centre is one of the most important centres for the Bantu group known as the Beti-Pahuin (Béti-Pahouin), the "Fang-Beti," or simply the "Fang". These peoples share a common language and have similar customs. The Beti-Pahuin are further broken down into the Beti, most of whom live in the Centre Province, and the Bulu and Fang, who primarily inhabit the South.

==== Beti ====
The Beti consist of several smaller groups. The Ewondo (or Yaoundé) occupy the Centre's most populated region, including Yaoundé, Mbalmayo, and the Nyong and So division. The Yezum and Yebekolo are Ewondo sub-groups. The Bane are more numerous in the South Province, but they have some members in the Nyong and So division. The Mbida-Mbane and Mvog-Nyenge live east of Yaoundé. The Eton-Beti, Eton-Beloua, and Beloua-Eton are headquartered in the Lekie division northeast of Yaoundé, including the towns of Saa and Obala. The territory of the Mvelle stretches east from Yaoundé along the Nyong valley to the northern portions of the Nyong and Mfoumou division, including the border town of Ayos and the plantation centre of Mbandjock. The Eki live throughout the Upper Sanaga division with settlements at Nanga Eboko and Minta.

In addition, some peoples in the Centre are not truly Beti-Pahuin but are currently in the process of being assimilated by that group. Among these are the Manguissa, who live in a small territory in the Lekie division between the Sanaga River and the town of Sa'a, the Bamvele, Batchanga (Tsinga), Evuzok, Omvang, Yekaba, and Yetudi.

==== Other tribes ====
The area around the town of Bafia and the west-jutting finger of land on the border of the Littoral Province is the home of several related peoples, collectively referred to as the Banen or Bafia. Tribes in this group include the Ndiki, Ntundu, Lemande, and Yambetta. The Bape and Bekke are also a part, though they were assimilated only fairly recently.

Though more numerous in the West and Northwest Provinces, several Tikar groups live in the Centre at northwestern border with the West Province and stretching north and east to the Njim River. Their main settlement in the province is Ngambe Tikar on the Kim River. The Centre's Tikar speak a language known as Tumu and its dialects. The Centre Province Tikar are further divided into the Bang-Heng, Bankim, Ditan, Ina, Ngambe, Ngume, Ue, and Yakong.

Large numbers of Bassa live in the Nyong and Kelle division near the border with the Littoral Province. They are primarily situated in small villages of isolated huts.

The Vute (Babuti) are a Bantu people who inhabit large swathes of the Mbam division to the east of Tikar and Bafia. Their domains are almost equal of those of the Beti in area.

Tribes present in smaller numbers in the province include the Bajem, Baki, Bamun, Bulu, Fa' (Balong), Gbete (Kepere), Gunu, Lafa, Maka, Njauti, Nyokon, and Pori. Several heterogeneous groups collectively known as the Yambassa live in and around Bafia-Banen territory.

Though most of these tribal groups have their own distinct languages, most people in the Centre also speak French.

=== Religion ===
European missionaries penetrated the territory under German and French colonial rule. Since, most of the region's inhabitants have converted to Christianity. The most prevalent denominations are Presbyterianism and Roman Catholicism, though traditional animist beliefs are commonly practiced alongside Christianity, especially in more rural areas.

== Economy ==
The Centre is one of Cameroon's strongest economic zones due in great part to the presence of the capital city. In fact, the area is second only to the coastal regions of the Littoral, South, and Southwest Provinces. Many international organisations are headquartered at Yaoundé, among them the Bank of Central African States and the African Organisation of Industrial Property.

=== Agriculture ===
==== Sustenance farming ====
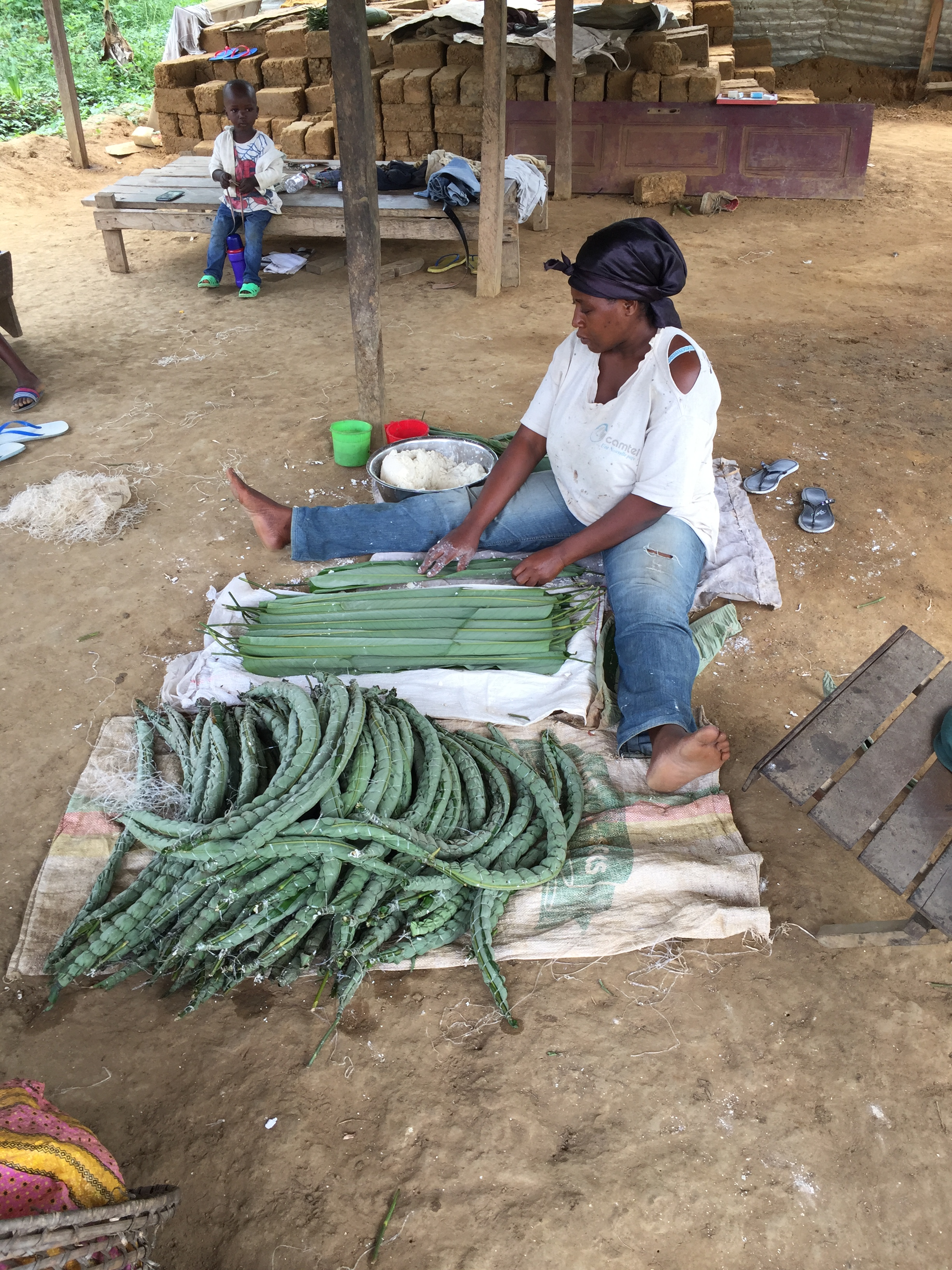
Woman selling bobolo (manioc) near Mbalmayo.

Most farmers in the Centre are largely concerned with the raising of crops such as plantains (common south of Yaoundé) and cocoyams and yams (common west and northwest of the capital). Rice and yam cultivation are practiced along the banks of the Sanaga in the Upper Sanaga division. Groundnuts, maize and other cereals are common in the province's less humid north, and manioc grows throughout.

Sustenance farmers first clear small patches of forest. They remove trees with traditional tools such as axes or machetes during the dry season and burn the resulting brush. Farmers take care to protect trees bearing edible fruit, such as mangoes, plums, and pears, though fires sometimes grow out of control and prevent this. Farmers then plant seeds after the first rains: spices and vegetables closer to the house, plantains and tubers in larger plots farther into the bush. Villagers traditionally group their farms together as protection against animals and harvest their crops at the beginning of the dry season.

Such slash-and-burn agriculture is adequate for the needs of small villages away from larger urban centres. Soil is exhausted quickly, necessitating the change of fields every two or three years. The soil can remain infertile for as much as ten years. However, when settlements are sparse, this presents little problem. As one of Cameroon's most populous areas, however, soil exhaustion has become an increasingly troublesome problem for the Centre in recent years. To combat this, MIDEVIV, the Food Development Authority, sets up growing zones around major towns, especially Yaoundé, for the growing of bananas, cocoyams, plantains, and other necessities.

==== Plantation agriculture ====
This region is one of Cameroon's most important cash-crop zones due to its hot, humid climate and well-developed infrastructure. Cocoa is king, and it grows in all areas but the Mbam division. The largest plantations are those outside of Yaoundé and to a greater extent to the northwest between the Nyong and Sanaga Rivers. Other major cocoa centres include the Sanaga River valley near Nanga Eboko and the regions around the towns of Akonolinga, Obala, and Saa. Some of these plantations are owned by peasant populations of Bassa and Ewondo, and SODECAO (Cocoa Development Company) is a major owner.

The Centre is also home to Cameroon's only sugar-cane plantations, located at Mbandjock. SOSUCAM (Société Sucrerie du Cameroun) is the largest company in the region with 40 km^{2}. Peasant sugar plantations also operate in the area.

A variety of other crops make up the rest of the plantation economy. Rice cultivation occurs along the Sanaga River valley in fields owned by SARIOECOO. Coffee is another important crop, grown in the eastern forests. Tobacco plantations owned by the Cameroon Tobacco Company (CTC) lie north of the Sanaga River at Batchenga. Palm plantations for palm oil and kernels, are located in the lower Sanaga and Nyong valleys, in the Nyong and Kelle division. Most of these are owned by SOCAPALM, headquartered in Eséka. Pineapples are grown commercially at Mbandjock by the Cameroon Pineapple Company.

==== Livestock ====
Livestock raising is another important economic sector, and Yaoundé is a major market for cattle from other regions of the country. Cattle are raised on ranches owned by the Livestock Development Authority at Mbandjock, and poultry are raised in farms at Makak, Obala, and Yaoundé to supply the province's vast demand for eggs and chicken. Sheep, goats, pigs, and poultry are also raised more informally throughout the area.

Hunting is practiced to some extent in more rural areas, but this has become increasingly rare as forest exploitation and firearms have depleted game species and their habitats. Bushmeat from the East and South Provinces is today a lucrative trade in Yaoundé and the large towns.

=== Industry ===
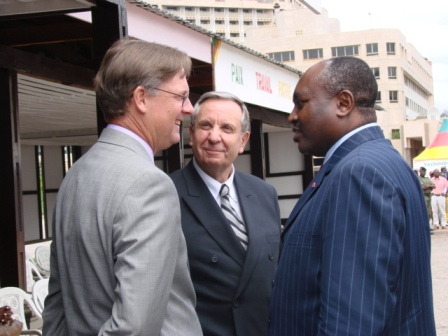
U.S. Ambassador R. Niels Marquardt, Parker Transnational Industries Cameroon Chairman Dr. Ralph Thomson, and Governor Fai Yengo Francis in Yaoundé at the launch of Le Bus, a new public transportation system, on 25 September 2006

Because of its immense territory devoted to cultivation, the Centre also has a substantial food processing industry. For example, CAMSUCO (Cameroon Sugar Company) has a large processing plant in Nkoetang that supplies eighty percent of Cameroon's sugar. SOCACAO (the Cameroon Cocoa Company) makes cocoa butter in Yaoundé. The Brasséries du Cameroun also operates in Yaoundé producing beers and soft drinks. Other food-processing plants are located in Nanga Eboko (rice hulling) and Eséka.

As it is the crossroads for logging vehicles travelling from the South and East Provinces, the Centre also has a sizeable timber processing industry. Major sawmills are located in Eséka, Mbalmayo, and Yaoundé. Other specialised plants do joinery work, veneer, furniture and construction.

The booming immigration to Yaoundé city has nourished a strong building industry there. Brick making and construction of homes and offices have ballooned in recent years. Rocks from around the capital are quarried for building material.

Artisans also form a significant slice of the economy. Those of Yaoundé have a co-op to help meet the needs of the tourist trade, while those of Nanga Eboko are renowned for their highly decorated pottery.

Diverse industries round out the Centre's repertoire. One example is the Bastos Company, which produces cigarettes in Yaoundé. Textiles are another major industry, and cotton gins operate in Yaoundé. The capital is also a major fabric production centre. Rutile is mined at Akonolinga.

=== Transportation ===
The Centre is the crossroads of Cameroon, and as such, it is well equipped to handle the large amount of traffic that passes through. Most roads between towns and to neighbouring provinces are paved, and most of these lead to Yaoundé. The capital also serves as the transportation and shipping heart of the area, and to a smaller extent, Cameroon as a whole.

National Road 1 heads from Yaoundé all the way to Kousséri and Fotoko in the Far North Province. National Road 2 heads south from the capital to Ambam before continuing into Gabon and Equatorial Guinea. National Road 3, Cameroon's most heavily trafficked and thus most dangerous, covers the stretch between Yaoundé and Douala. National Road 4 travels northwest to Bafoussam in the West Province. National Road 9, one of the few that do not travel through the capital, begins at Mbalmayo and leads to the South Province towns of Sangmélima, Djoum, and Mintom. Finally, National Road 10 travels east from Yaoundé to Ayos and ultimately Bonis in the East Province.

The Centre also forms an important hub of transportation by rail, air, and river. Train lines travel from Yaoundé to Douala and to Ngaoundéré in the north. An international airport is located just outside Yaoundé at Nsimalen, and airstrips are at Akonolinga, Bafia, Eséka, Mbandjock, and Nanga Eboko. The Nyong River is navigable from Mbalmayo northeast to Abong-Mbang in the East during the wet season.

=== Tourism ===
Many international visitors to Cameroon see at least the city of Yaoundé, if nowhere else. The majority of these travellers visit on company or government business, so the Centre sees little tourism per se. Yaoundé does offer many hotels, however, to handle the business and diplomatic traffic through the city. It is also the location of several manmade lakes used for sport and bathing. Most of Cameroon's monuments and museums are located in the capital.

Several of the province's traditional chief's compounds are accessible to visitors. Among these is the compound of Matip Ma Ndombol of the Ndjogjel district of Eséka.

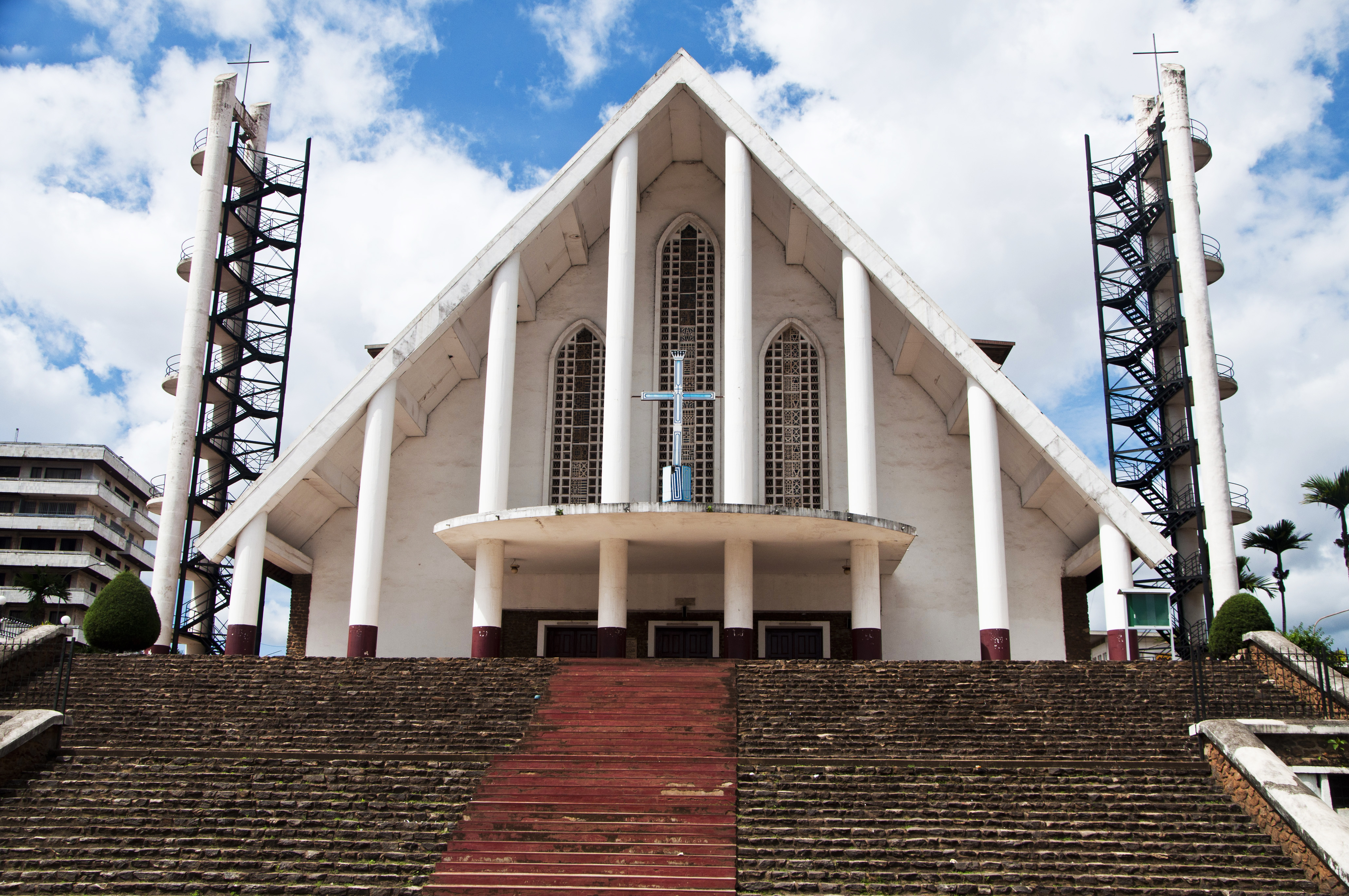
Notre Dame Cathedral, Yaounde

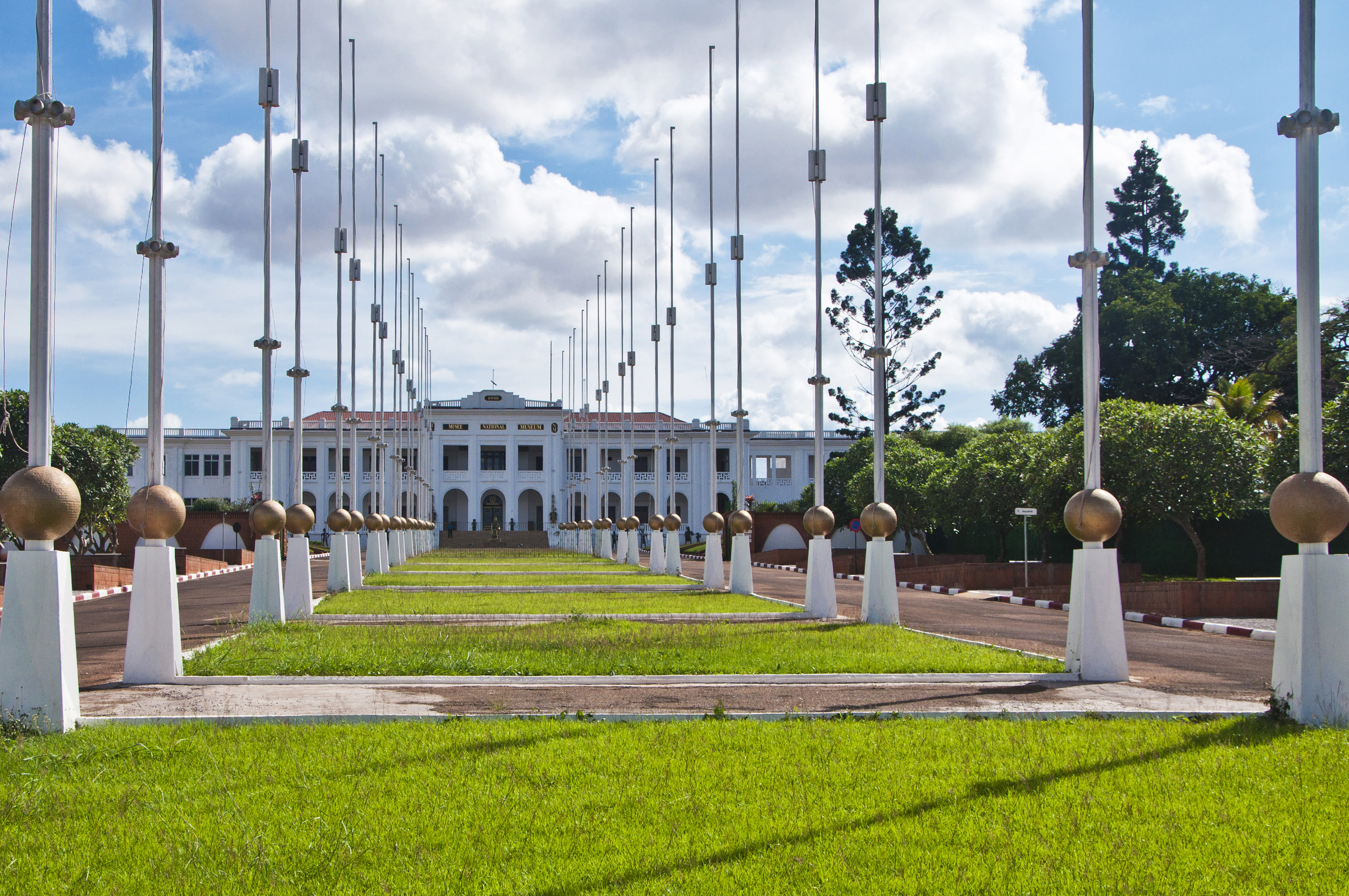
National Museum, Yaounde

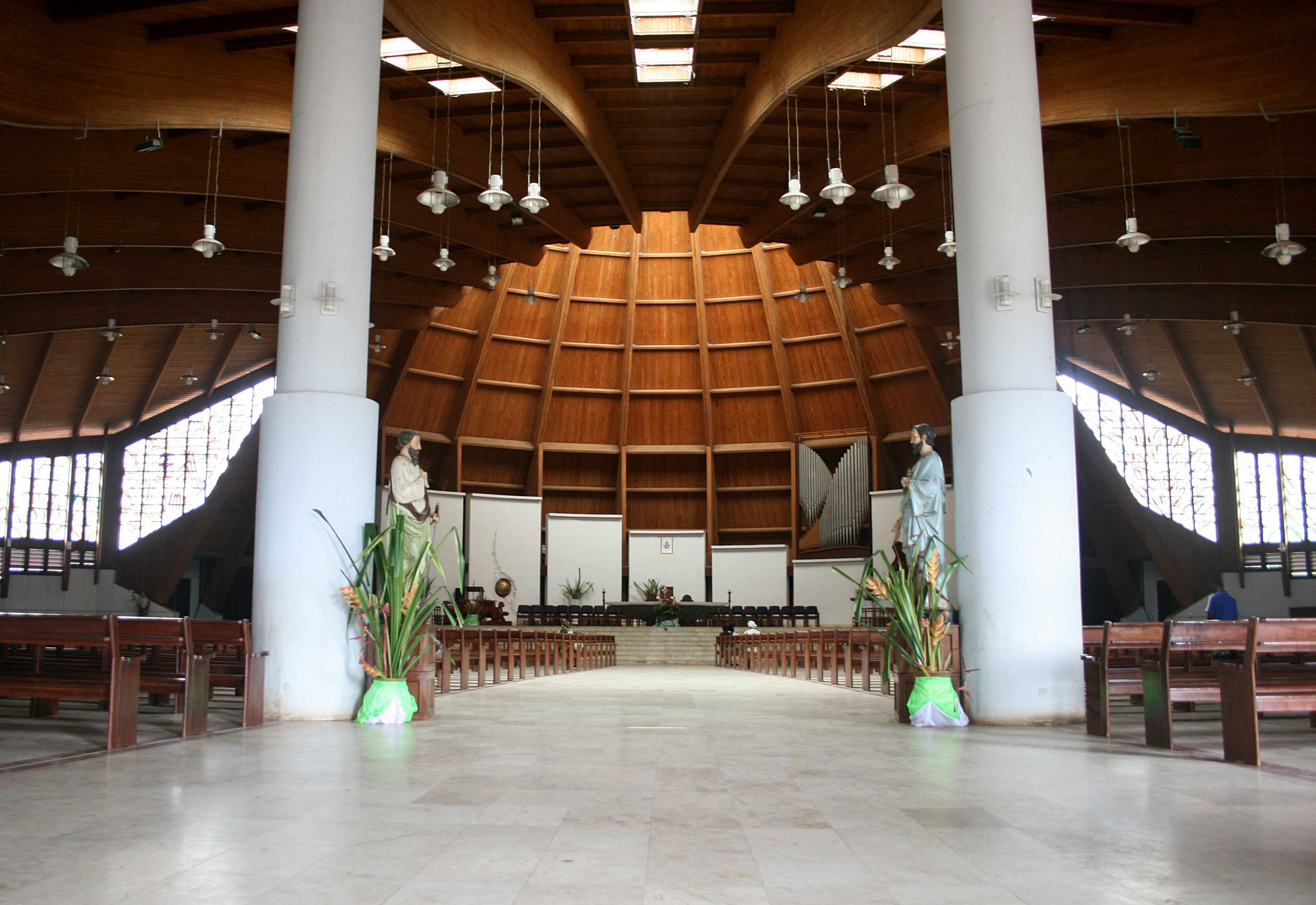
Basilica of Mary Queen of Apostle, Yaounde

== Administration and social conditions ==
Cameroon's president, Paul Biya, has his official residence in Yaoundé, though he spends much of his time abroad. Biya enjoys a great deal of political support from the Centre's Beti majority, thanks in part to his policy of staffing the government and government-owned businesses with plenty of representatives of this ethnic group.

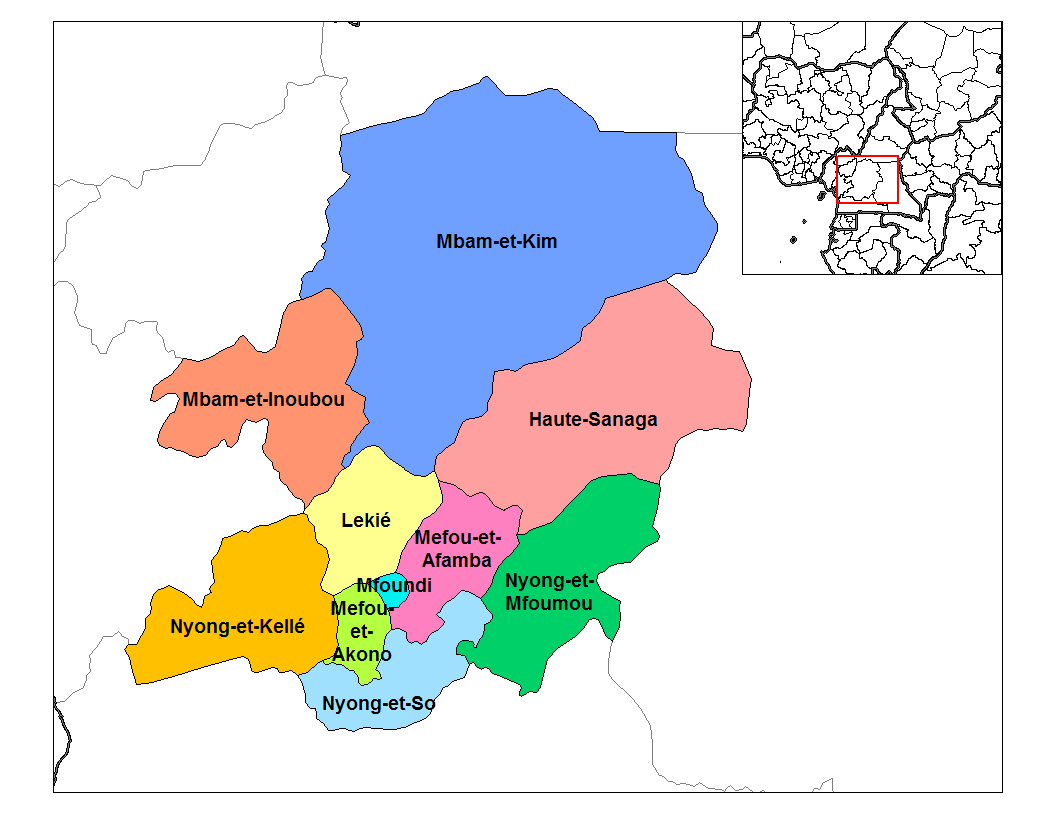
Departments of the Centre Region.

=== Government ===
The province is divided into ten departments (departements):

1. Lekié, with its capital at Monatélé, is northwest of Yaoundé
2. Haute-Sanaga (Upper Sanaga), with its capital Nanga Eboko, in the west and centre of the province
3. Mbam-et-Inoubou (Mbam and Inoubou), with its capital at Bafia,
4. Mbam-et-Kim (Mbam and Kim), with its capital at Ntui, is the largest, occupying almost the entire northern half of the province
5. Méfou-et-Afamba (Méfou and Afamba), with its capital at Mfou, is the area east and south of Yaoundé.
6. Méfou-et-Akono (Méfou and Akono), with its capital at Ngoumou.
7. Mfoundi consists entirely of the Yaoundé capital and greater area.
8. Nyong-et-Kéllé (Nyong and Kéllé), with its capital at Eséka, occupies the southwest corner of the province.
9. Nyong-et-Mfoumou (Nyong and Mfoumou) is opposite this at the southeast, governed from Akonolinga.
10. Nyong-et-So'o (Nyong and So'o), with Mbalmayo as its capital, is on the central border with the South Province.

Each of these departments is headed by a presidentially appointed prefect (prefet), also called a senior divisional officer. The governor, also a presidential appointee, has his offices in Yaoundé.

==== Traditional political organisation ====
Several of the Centre's native peoples have at least some form of political organisation predating the colonial period. However, the province's majority, the various Beti peoples, has no strong traditions in this sector. Instead, a patriarch traditionally heads a clan of related families. These individuals can still be found today, though their positions are largely honorary.

The Tikar, on the other hand, have strong political traditions. Each Tikar group is headed by a fon (foyn), who serves as the head of administration, religion, and ritualistic affairs. Below him are various nobles and lords who handle administrative tasks in smaller divisions of territory.

Among the Banen, some sub-tribal groups are headed by a chief. Such individuals are rare, but they rule with absolute authority where they occur. Most Banen are merely loose connections of family groups, however. The Bafia and Yambassa have a similar structure with clans of family groups. The heads of the joint-families are the most important individuals in this traditional hierarchy.

=== Education ===
The Centre is the intellectual capital of Cameroon. The University of Yaoundé is the biggest and most important institution in the country, though smaller universities exist in the capital city and other towns. Yaoundé also tends to draw more educated migrants, as the jobs available there are often in government or for the various international organisations that have their headquarters there.

Primary and secondary schools are also fairly widespread and easily accessible to most of the Centre's population. Primary schools are more widely distributed, even in many smaller villages. Secondary schools are less common, but due to the region's well-developed transportation network, students are able to travel to the larger towns where such schools are located relatively easily. This still requires them to stay with relatives or to lease rooms, however, high rent and school fees keep many students from pursuing higher levels of education. Due to the region's high population, many of these schools are critically understaffed and overcrowded.

=== Health ===
The Centre is serviced by a large number of hospitals and clinics, particularly in Yaoundé and in the larger towns. Traditional medicine is still common throughout, especially in the more rural areas.

As with the rest of Cameroon, sanitation is the greatest health problem faced in the province. In rural areas, running water is not available, necessitating the drinking of water from contaminated rivers, streams, and swamps. The urban areas, particularly Yaoundé, present their own problems, as rates of population growth far outpace improvements in sanitation. As a result, outbreaks of illnesses such as amoebic dysentery, bacterial dysentery, and hepatitis A occur frequently. Large rainfall and inadequate drainage improvements also provide an ideal breeding ground for malaria-carrying mosquitoes in the capital.

=== Cultural life ===
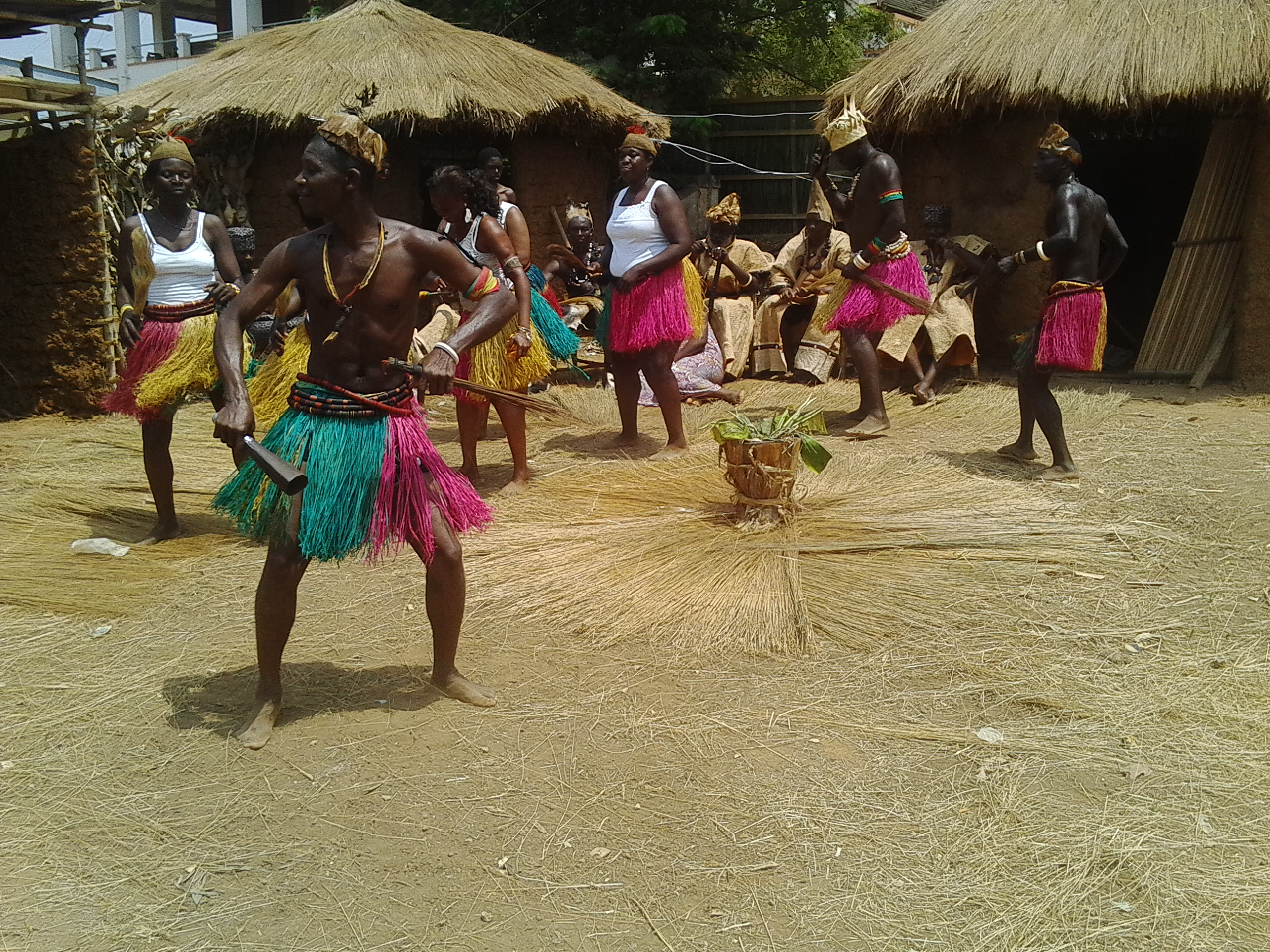
Bafia dance

The majority of Cameroon's museums are located in Yaoundé. The largest of these is the Cameroonian Art Museum (Musée d'Art Camerounais), with its large collection of bas reliefs, bronze statuary, and traditional masks. This is also the only museum set up to handle both English- and French-speaking patrons. The Afhemi Museum is located in a private residence and showcases the owners own collection of Cameroonian art. The National Museum, located in the mansion once occupied by the French governor, offers cultural as well as artistic exhibits.

The Centre is also the birthplace of bikutsi, a popular form of dance and music. The Ewondo people created the style, which today rivals makossa as Cameroon's most famous.

==== Traditional dances ====
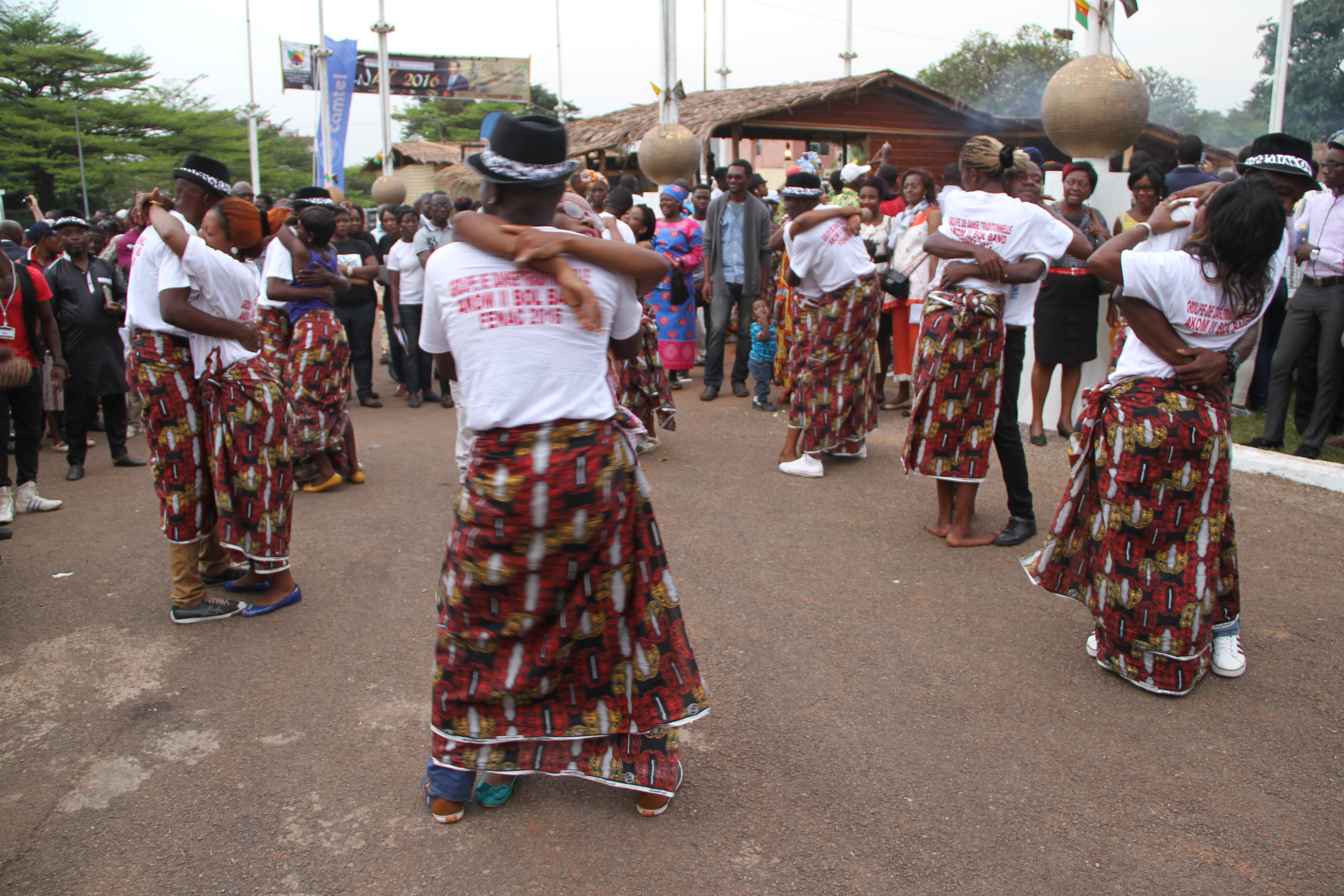
Beti people

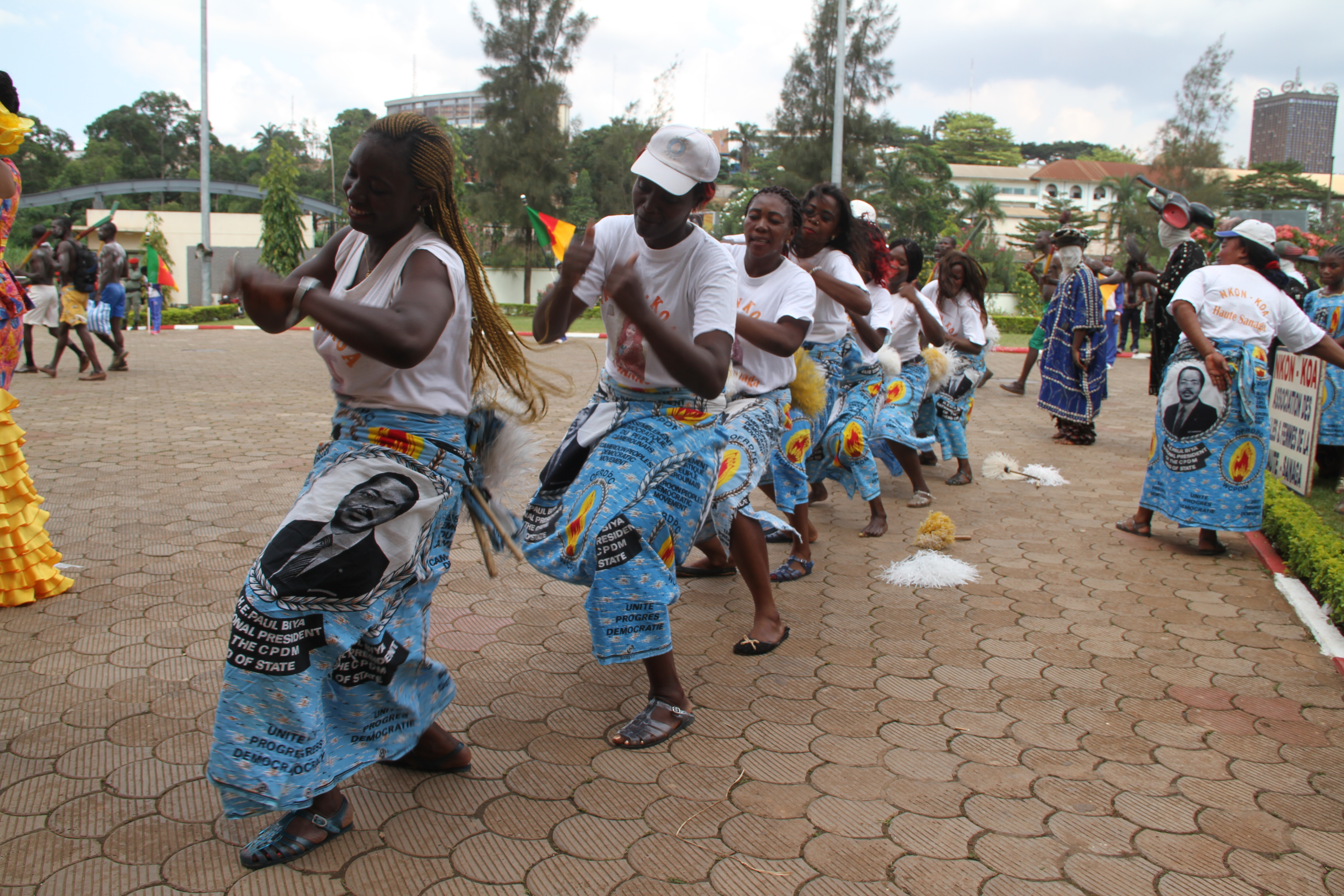
Bafia

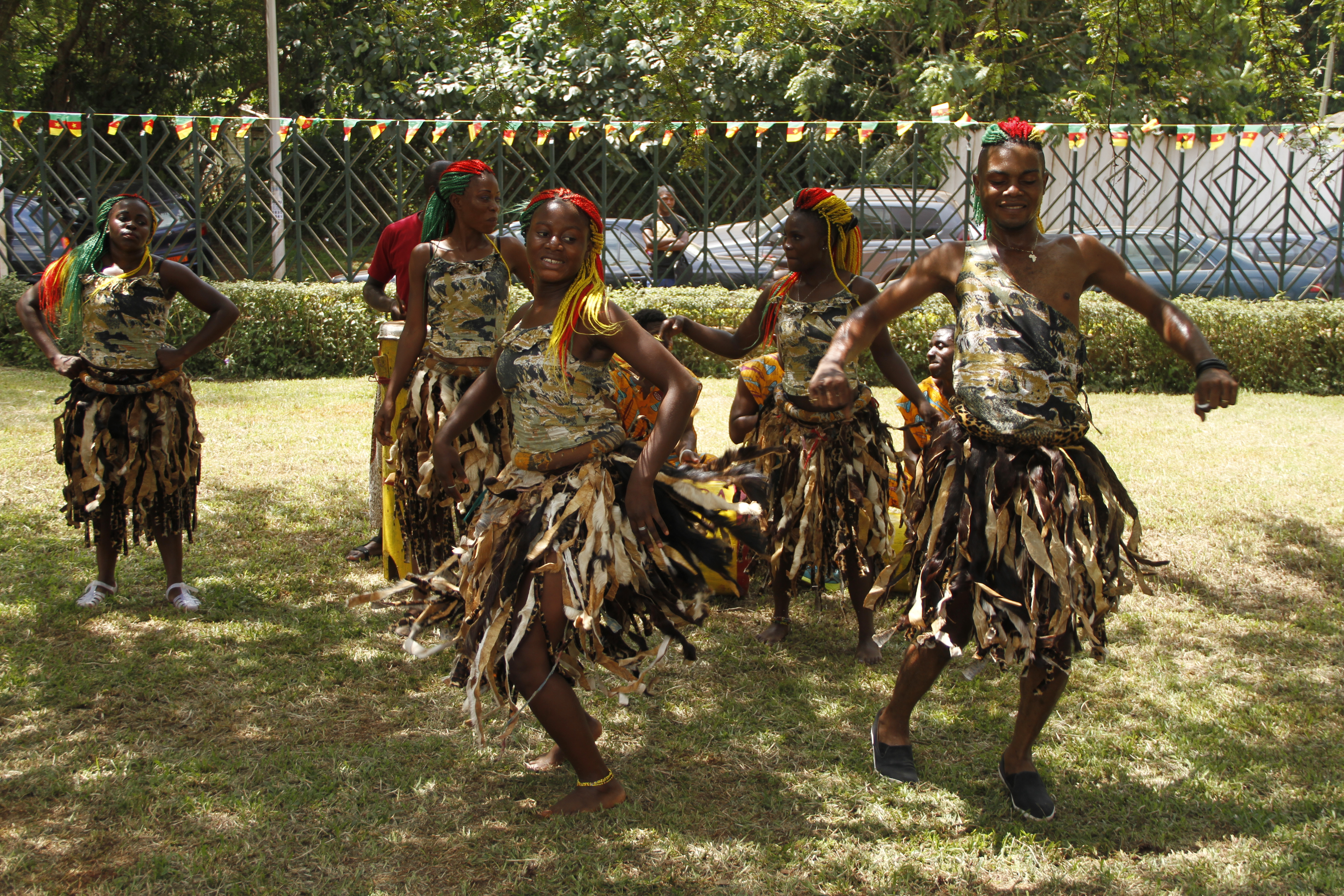
Bikutsi

Common Food

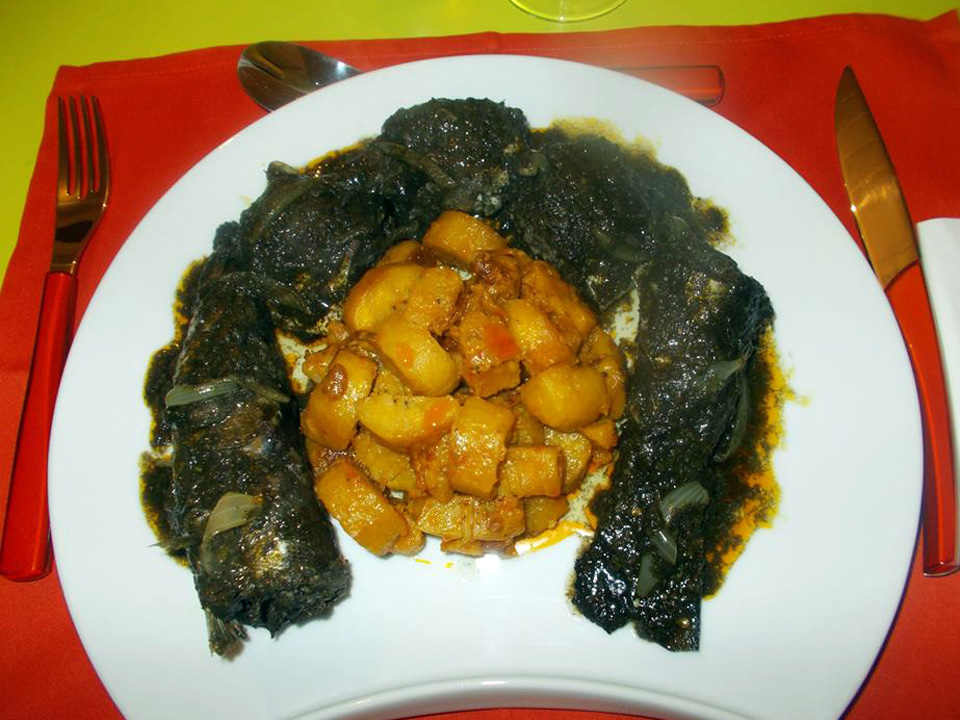
Mbongo Tchobi (Bassa)

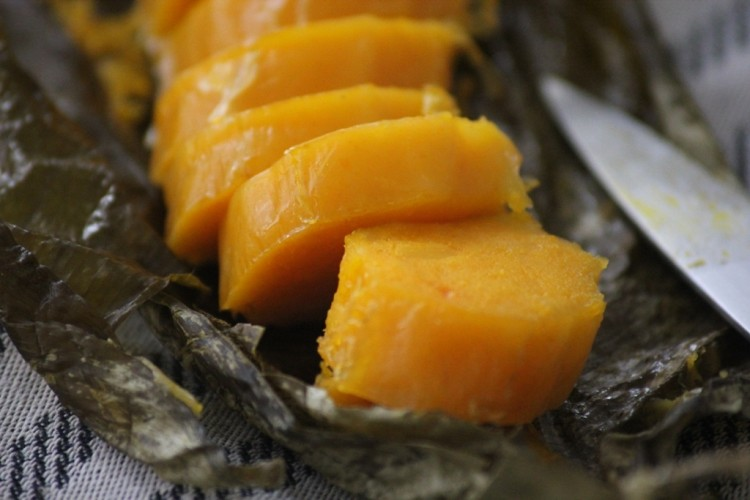
Mintumba

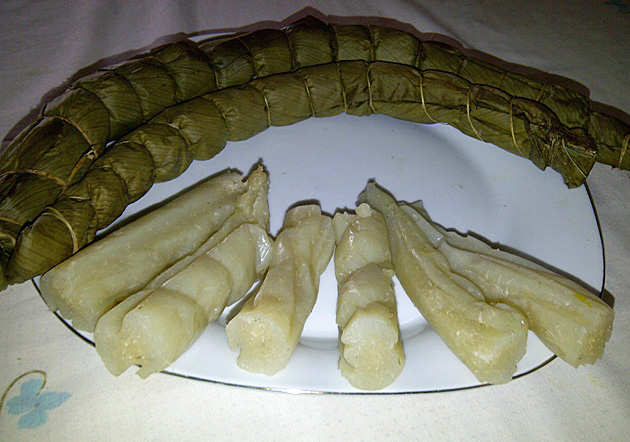
Bobolo

== History ==
=== Early population movements ===
Ancient tools found at Bafia, Efok, Okola, and Yaoundé attest to human presence in today's Centre Province since before recorded history. Of Cameroon's current inhabitants, the Baka pygmies probably roamed the area when it was more heavily wooded. In comparison, the modern inhabitants of the area are relative newcomers.

According to one theory, much of the current Centre Province was once Bassa territory. The Bassa moved into the region from northeast of the Sanaga River before the 17th or 18th century. Another explanation of the Bassa's presence in the Centre says that they once lived further west, but they moved into the territory in the 18th century after ceding their coastal possessions to the Duala people. The Banen, Bafia, and Yambassa in the Babimbi region also moved to their present territories at this time, stopping their expansion upon reaching Bassaland to the southwest.

The next wave of migration was in the 19th century and consisted of those peoples fleeing Fulbe (Fula) raids to the north, or else fleeing other tribes who were themselves being raided. It is possible that the Tikar of the province's northwest moved in at this time. The Vute entered the area from the southern Adamawa Plateau, having once inhabited the present territories of Banyo and Tibati. Vute tradition states that they moved south in three major groups, each under a different prince. The Vute were still in the process of migrating when the Germans finally stopped their progress.

The Beti-Pahuin moved into the region at this time as well, travelling through in three separate waves from northeast, south of the Sanaga River. They were being pressured by the Gbaya, Mbum, and Vute farther north. As these people moved south, the Beti-Pahuin were forced to move further south, as well. The Beti-Pahuin conquered the peoples they encountered on this southward march, "Pahuinising" them in the process or pushing them away in their turn. A reputation for cannibalism may have aided them in their conquests. If the Bassa did indeed once inhabit territories further to the east, it was at this time that they were pressed toward the coast. These Beti-Pahuin groups moved southward to their present territories in small groups of families of clans. These first few waves, consisting of the Bulu and the Fang, continued into the present South Province and beyond, but the Beti, who moved south in the final wave, settled north of these relatives.

The Bati-Tsinga were the original inhabitants of the current Banen-Bafia-Yambassa areas, but they were pushed away or assimilated when the Yambassa entered the region. The Yambassa came in search of farmland, moving in three major groups: the Behele, then the Elip, and finally the Kouono-Yambassa. They were pushed south in turn when the Banen-Bafia entered from the confluence of the Mbam and Noun rivers. They were then troubled by the Bamun to the northwest, and the Banen fought two wars with them beginning around 1840; they eventually pushed the Bamun across the Noun, though some Banen groups paid tribute to the Bamun until 1901. One tradition says that the Bafia also fought off the Fulbe. The other small tribes of the Bafia region came at later times.

=== European contacts ===
The movement of the Beti-Pahuin through the region coincided with the height of the European slave trade on Cameroon's coast. The Ewondo took the opportunity to establish themselves as middlemen in this trade, forming a link between the tribes further on the interior and those toward the sea. Their slaves were sent out via the Sanaga River in exchange for European goods. After Great Britain outlawed the slave trade in 1827, trade continued in other goods, though slaves still left the area clandestinely. The Bassa also enjoyed similar go-between status.

This period also saw the introduction of Christianity to the region when the Basel Mission set up a station at Eséka.

=== German administration ===
Three years after the German annexation of the Cameroons in 1884, the first white men moved in, under orders of governor Julius Baron Von Soden, to explore the territories of the Beti. A later governor, Jesko Von Puttkamer, began extensive plantation farming in the south of Cameroon, particularly of cocoa, which he introduced in 1905. Native peoples were used as forced labour. In response to this and to their loss of lucrative trade to the Germans, the Ewondo revolted in 1895 but were suppressed the next year. Other rebellions occurred under the Bane and Mbidambani. A second Ewondo resistance occurred in 1907 when the Germans tried to prop up their collaborator, Charles Atangana, as the over-chief of all Ewondo.

Germany made various improvements to the territory, including the building of roads from Cameroon's coast to the inland areas, beginning in 1900. The first long-distance automobile journey took place in 1913, from Kribi to Yaoundé, a distance of 280 km, in eleven hours. The Germans also brought the railroad to the area, beginning a line from Douala to Yaoundé in 1909. Work was stopped at the outbreak of World War I, however. Germany moved the capital of the colony from Buea to Yaoundé at this time. Some of the Centre's largest towns and cities were originally German outposts, including Yaoundé (founded in 1889) and Mbalmayo.

A Catholic mission and school were established in Yaoundé in 1901 by the German Pallotin Fathers. This was followed by similar setups in other settlements until 1907. The Presbyterians were quick to follow, establishing a presence in 1909.

=== French administration ===
The French gained control of the Centre Province territory in 1916 after World War I. They divided Cameroon into several zones, and the current Centre Province's area fell into the Yaoundé, Edéa-Eséka, and Ebolowa-Akoafim zones.

Much of France's administration of the territory was simply a continuation of policies set up by the Germans. The French continued Germany's plantations, for example, and expanded them aggressively. The French Company for the Development of Tobacco (SFDT) set up in Batchenga near Yaoundé in 1947, and the sugar plantation at Mbandjock was planted in 1964. In fact, the town of Mbandjock did not exist then but grew up around the French sugar cane. The French also maintained the German policy of propping up puppet chiefs when existing traditional rulers were uncooperative or where such native rulers were absent. They also opened a school in Yaoundé on 27 December 1933 to educate and indoctrinate the sons of chiefs.

France made many more improvements to the territory, as well. To begin with, though Germany had moved the Cameroonian capital to Yaoundé, the French made it look the part. They built large, opulent government buildings there, including a governor's mansion. The railroad between Douala and Yaoundé was finished in 1927, and this was modernised in 1933. The main road from Douala and on to Bertoua was widened and improved in 1939. Yaoundé also became the location of an international airport. In the realm of education, an Advanced Primary School was placed in Yaoundé in 1939, and Ayos became the site of a nursing school in 1925.

The French expansion into the region also allowed better access for missionary groups. The Seventh-day Adventists set up centres in Nanga Eboko and Yaoundé, and this religion continues to claim large numbers of followers in the province. A major Catholic seminary opened in Yaoundé in 1927.

==== Political developments ====
By making Yaoundé the centre of government, France also made it the centre of the colony's politics. After France made all its West African colonies self-governing in 1956, many of Cameroon's earliest political parties were located there. The biggest of these were the Union Camerounaise, with large constituencies in the Centre and North (led by Ahmido Ahidjo), and the Democrats Camerounais (DC), with support from the Yaoundé region and headed by André-Marie Mbida. Most of these parties offered a pro-independence platform.

The capital was also the natural site of early political protests. When the colony's most vocal political party, Union des Populations du Cameroun (UPC), rioted there over raised prices at Yaoundé market stalls, for example, the government outlawed the group. This led to multiple clashes between pro- and anti-UPC factions in Yaoundé, which continued even after independence in 1960.

=== Post-independence ===
Under Cameroon's first president, Amadou Ahidjo, Cameroon was split into seven provinces. The present-day Centre and South Provinces were at this time combined into one Centre-South Province. It would remain this way until Cameroon's second president, Paul Biya, split the Centre-South into the present Centre and South Provinces on 22 August 1983. Under Ahidjo, the railway was pushed northeast, reaching Bélabo in the East Province in 1974. In an effort to better unify the north and south portions of the country, Ahidjo also ordered a road built north from Yaoundé to Ngaoundéré (National Road 1). Ahidjo also paved major roads, including the stretches between Douala and Yaoundé and Bafoussam and Yaoundé, beginning in 1966.

Education also experienced improvement. The University of Yaoundé was founded in 1962 for a student body of 7,500. After large student protests in 1973 and 1980 against overcrowding of the facilities, that institution was decentralised, and other universities were opened in other regions of the country.
