= List of rivers of Cameroon =

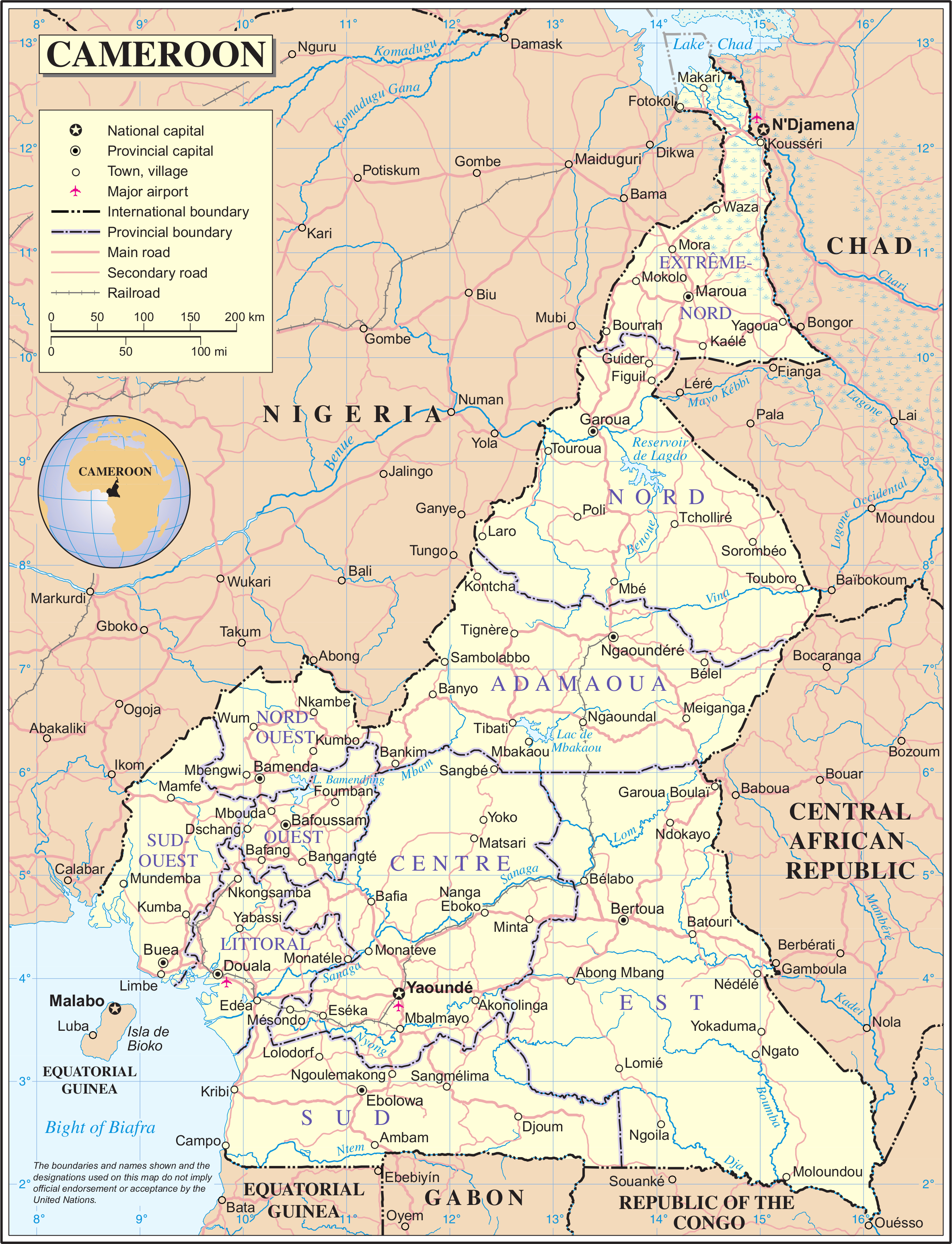
Map of Cameroon showing the main rivers and tributaries.

This is a list of rivers in Cameroon. This list is arranged by drainage basin, with respective tributaries indented under each larger stream's name.

== Gulf of Guinea ==
- Niger River (Nigeria)
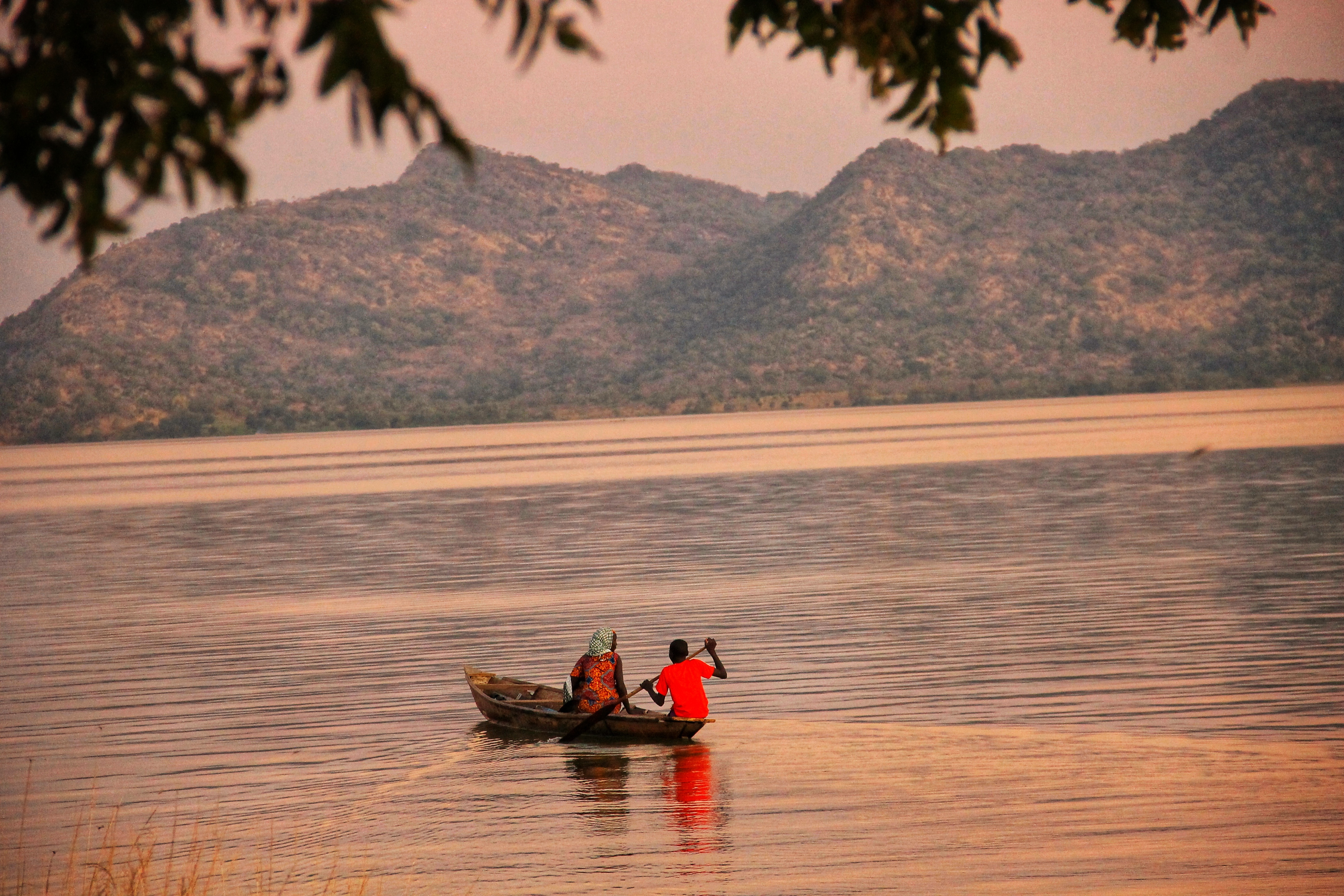
  - A man and woman crossing the Benue River with a canoe
    Benue River
    - Katsina Ala River
      - Menchum River
    - Donga River
    - Faro River
      - Déo River
    - Mayo Kébbi
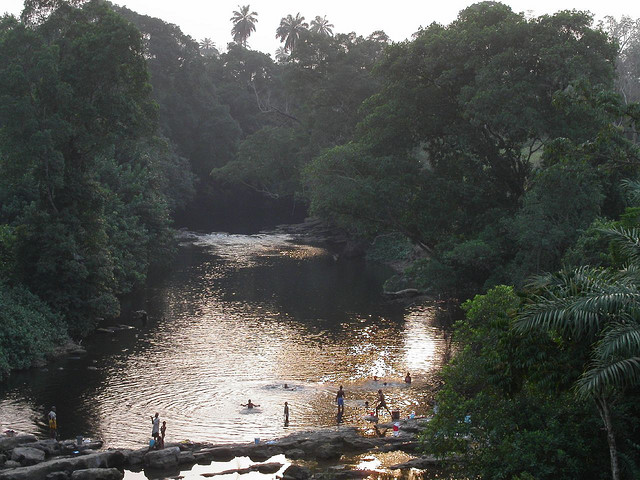
- Cross River (Manyu River), Cameroon
  Cross River (Manyu River)
  - Akwayafe River
- Rio del Ray
- Meme River
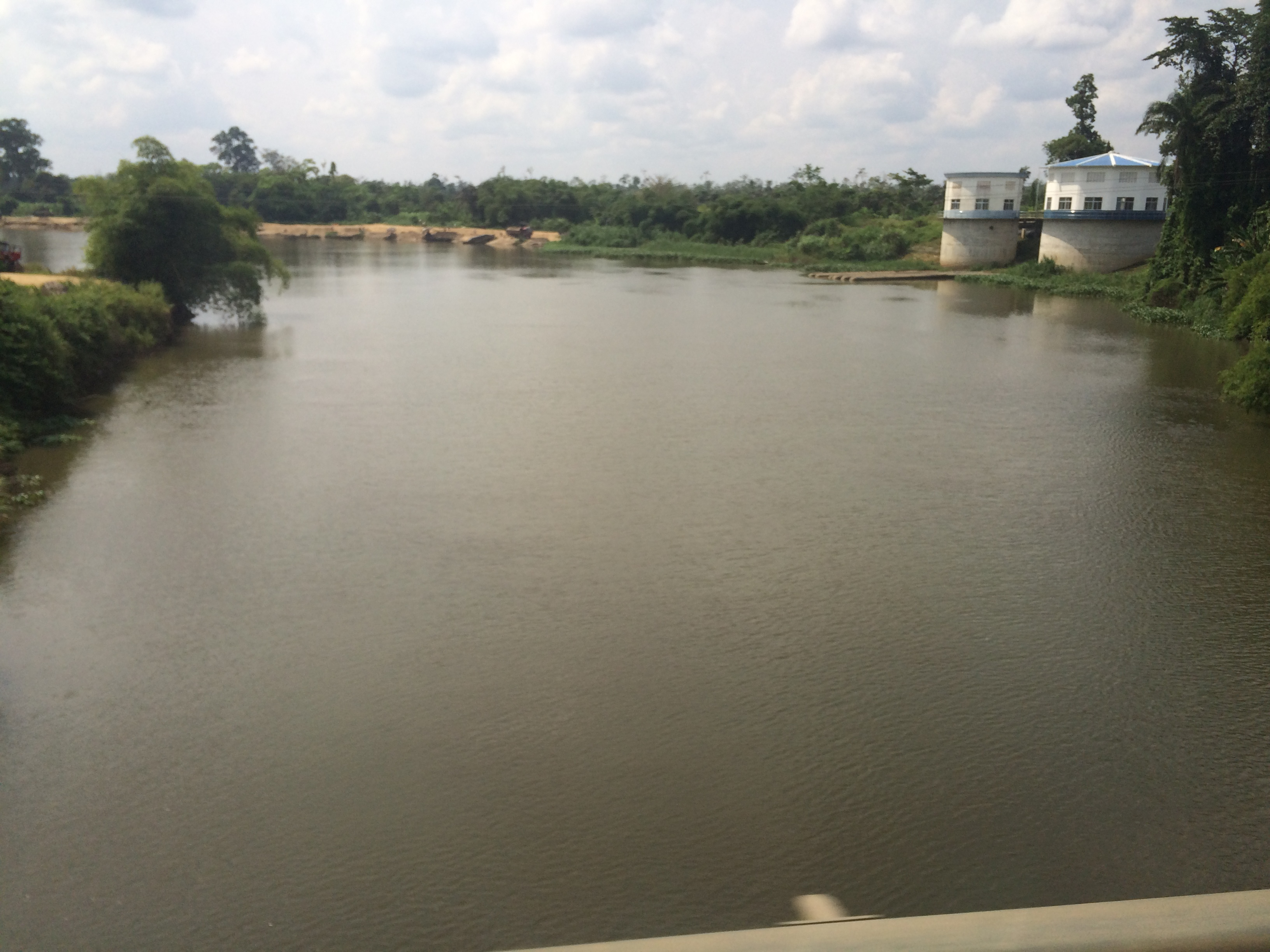
- Mungo River, Cameroon
  Mungo River
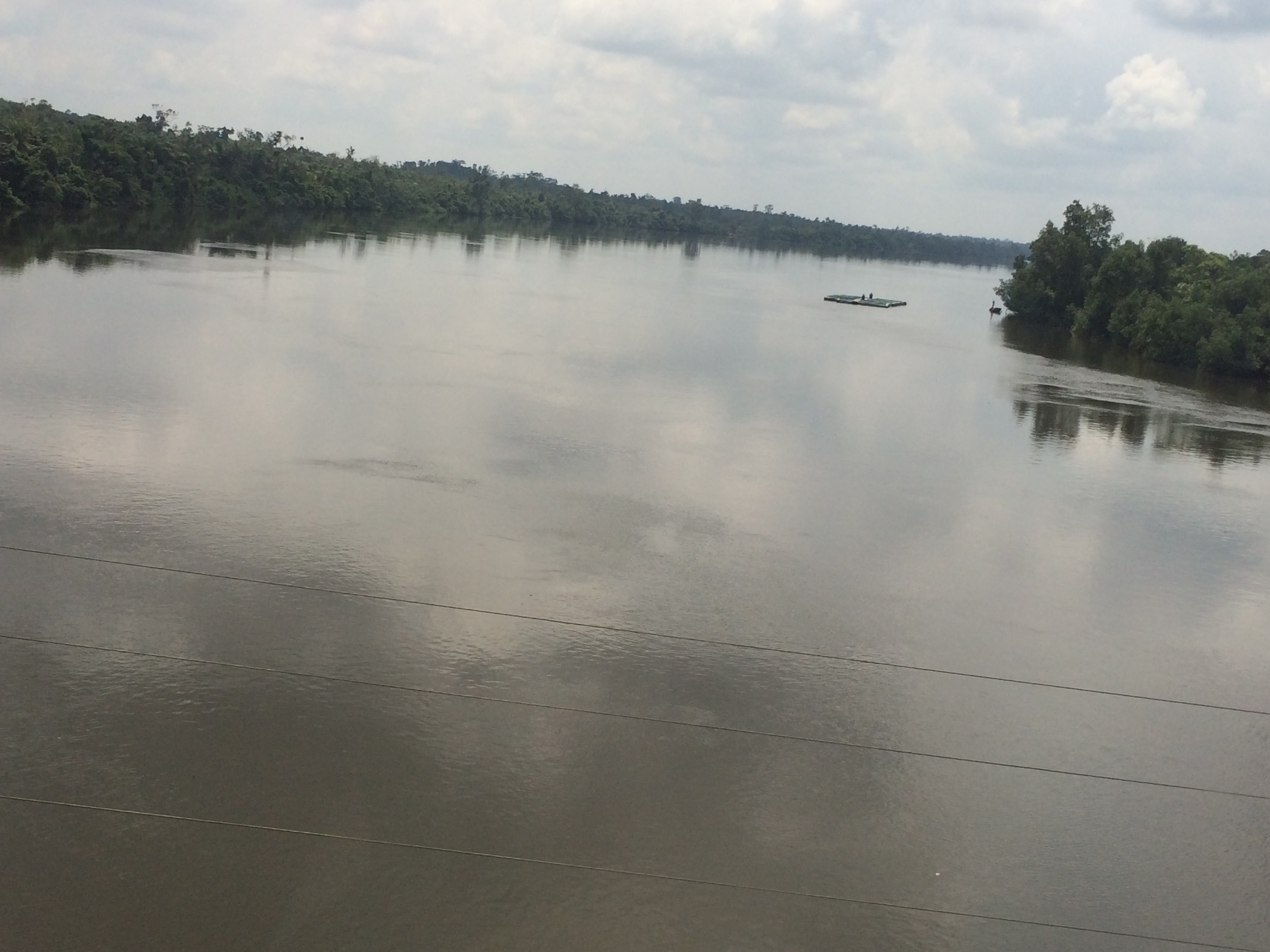
- Wouri River, Littoral Cameroon
  Wouri River
  - Makombé River
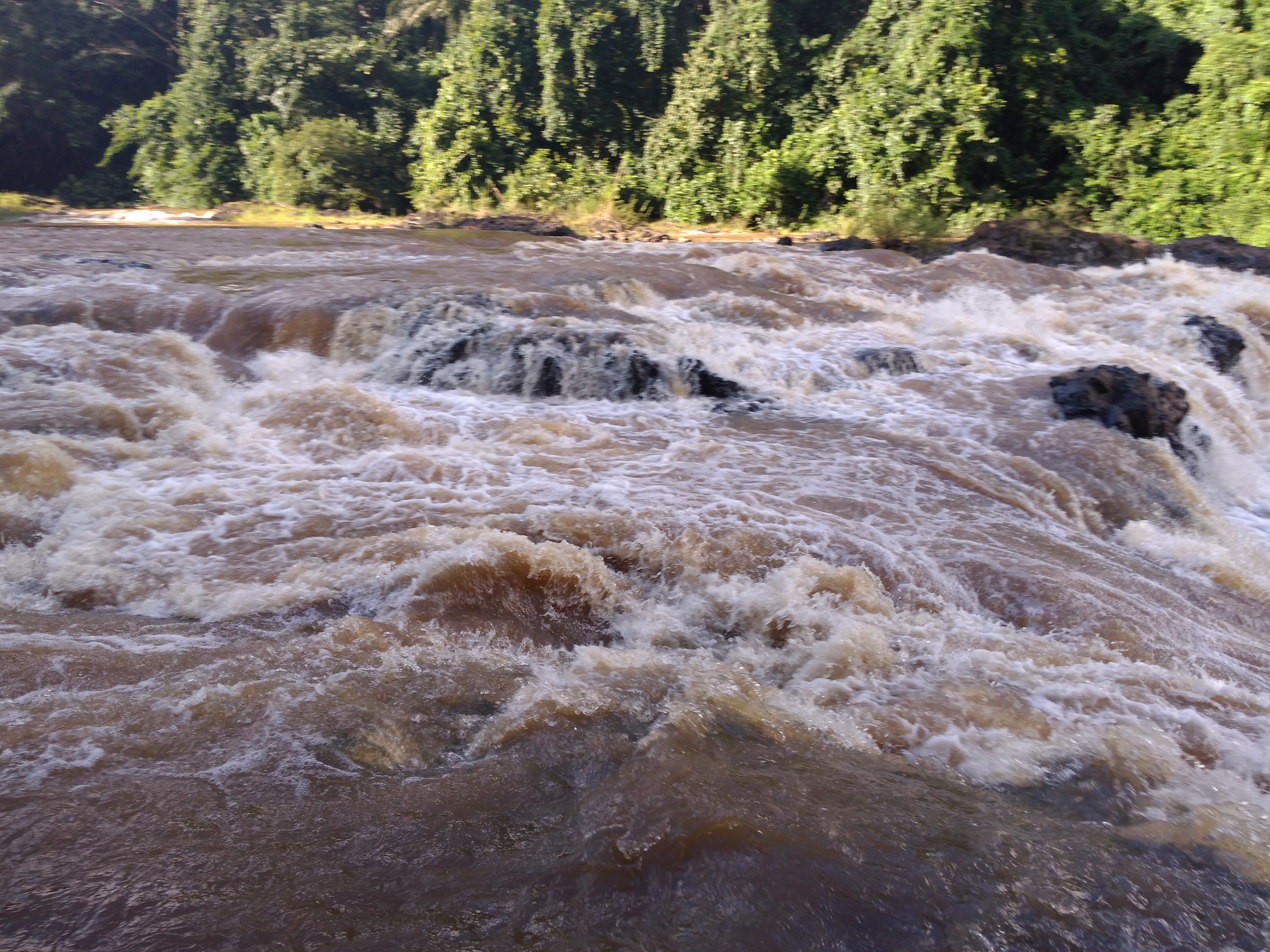
  - Nkam River
    Nkam River
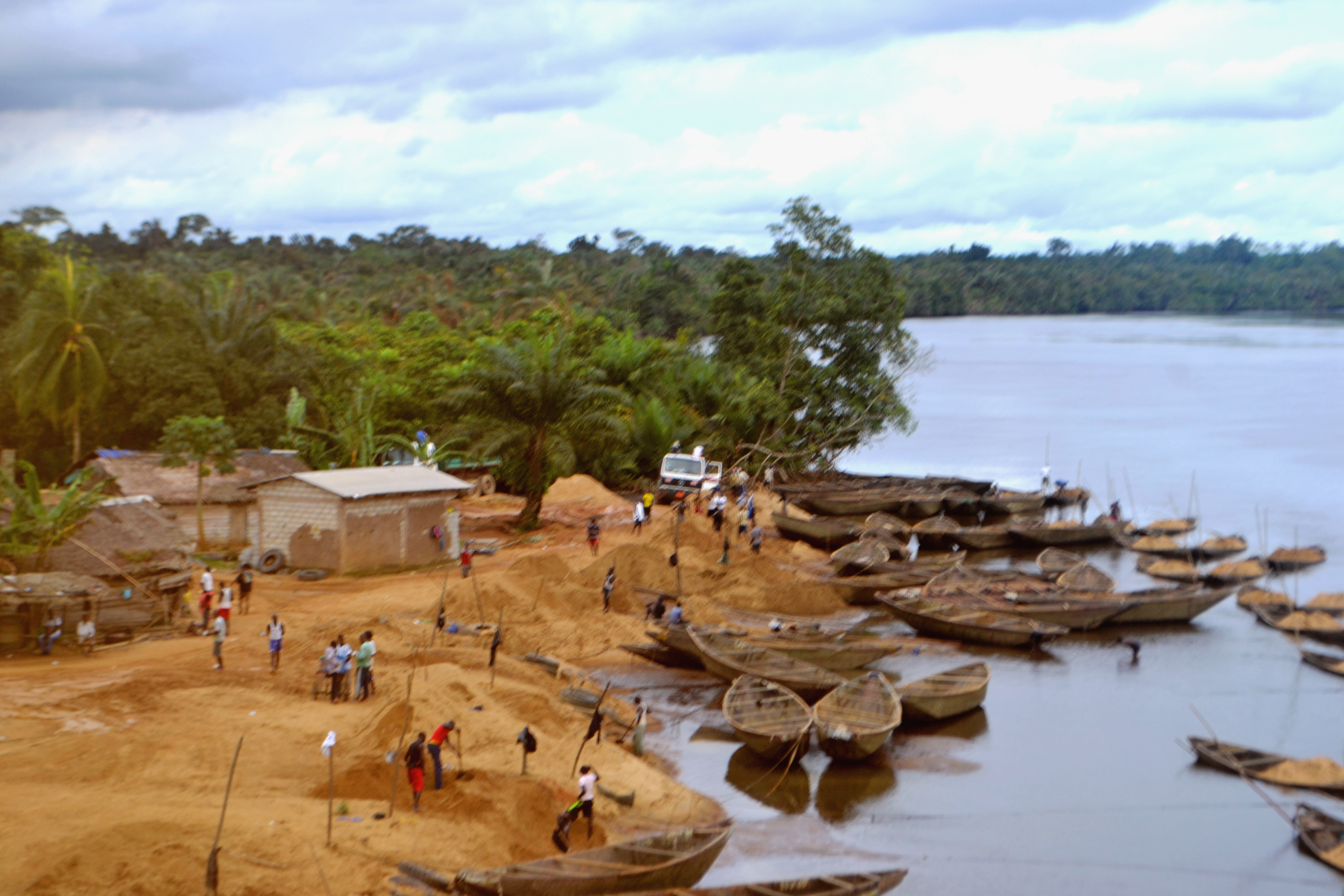
- Dibamba River
  Dibamba River
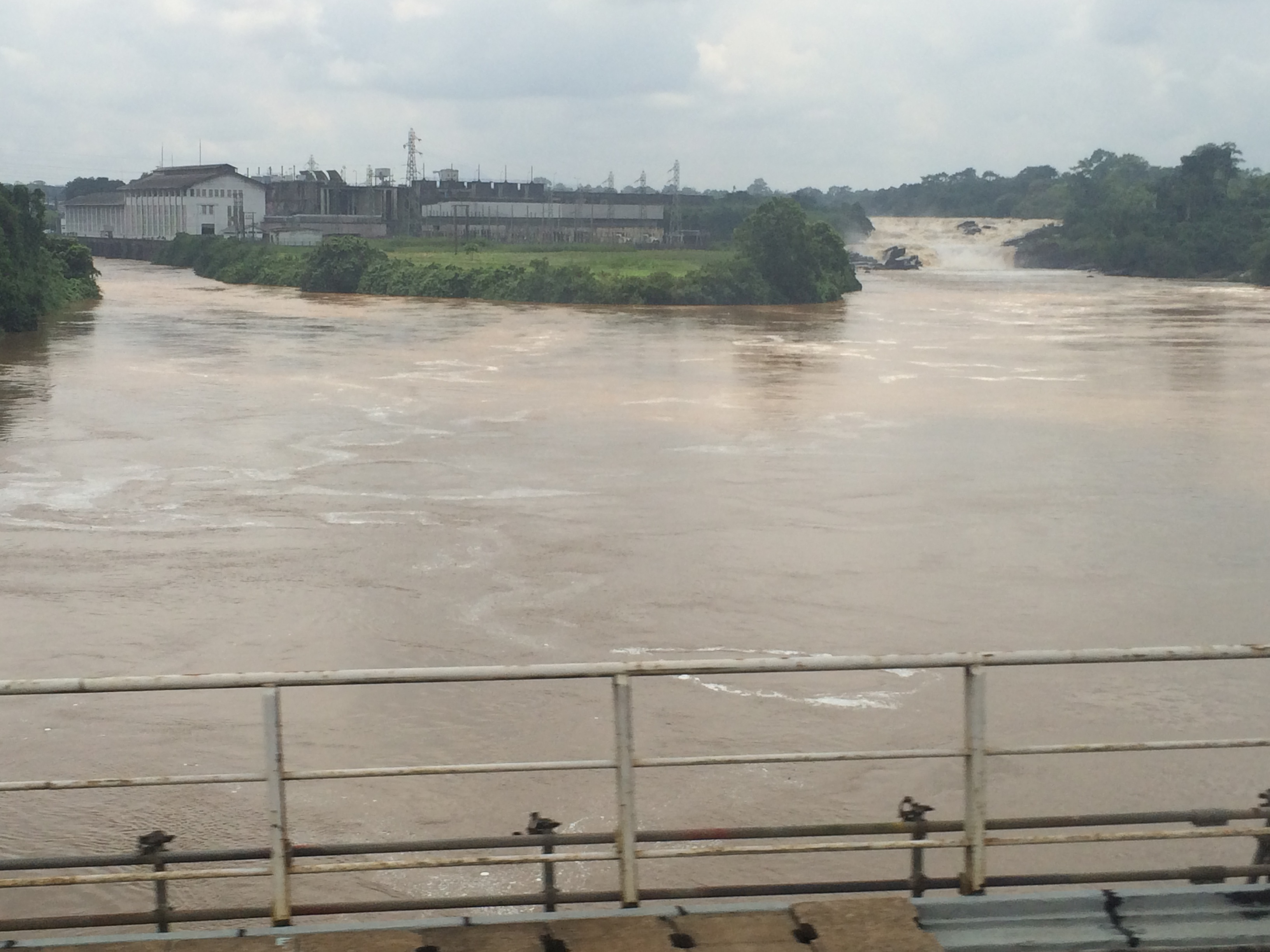
- Sanaga River
  Sanaga River
  - Mbam River
    - Ndjim River
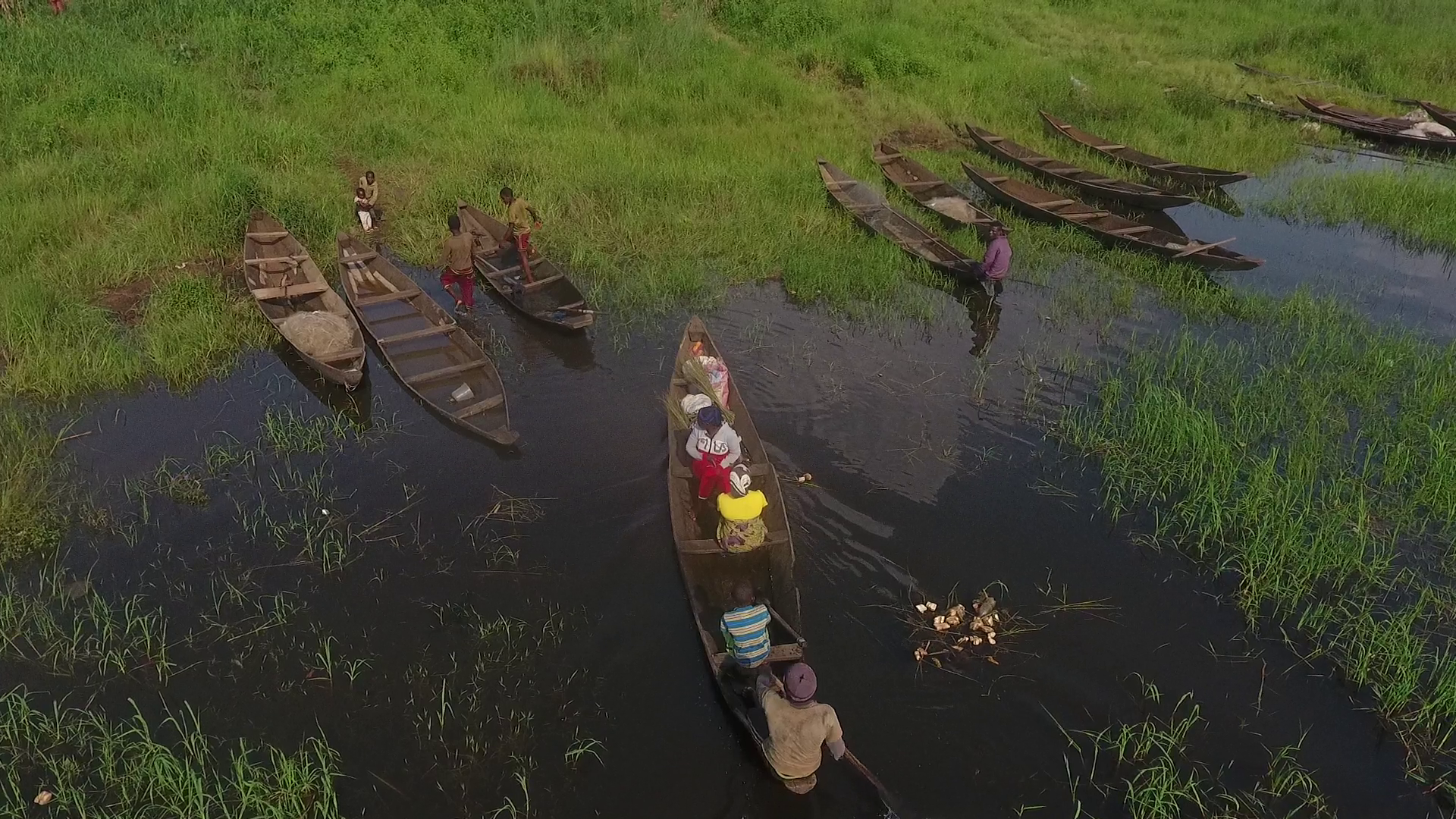
    - Banks of Noun River
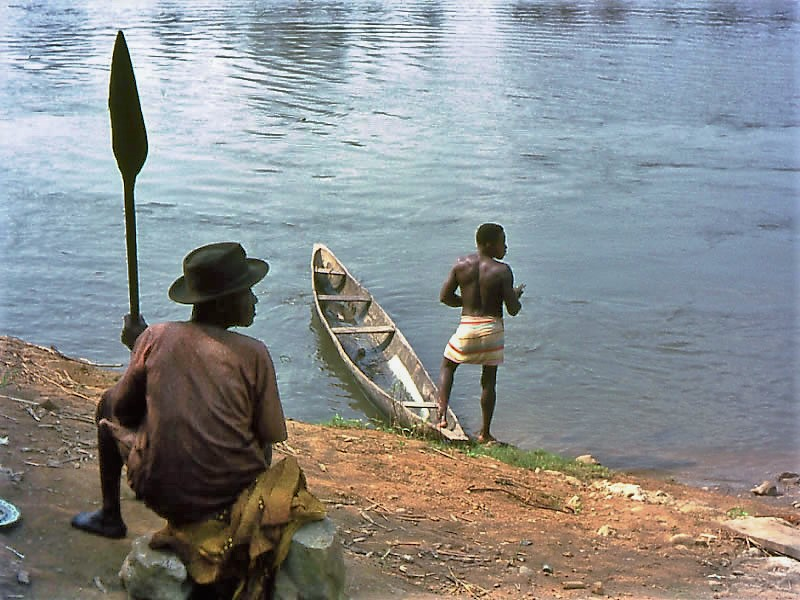
      Pirogue on Noun River.
      Noun River
    - Kim River
  - Lom River
    - Pangar River
  - Djeréme River
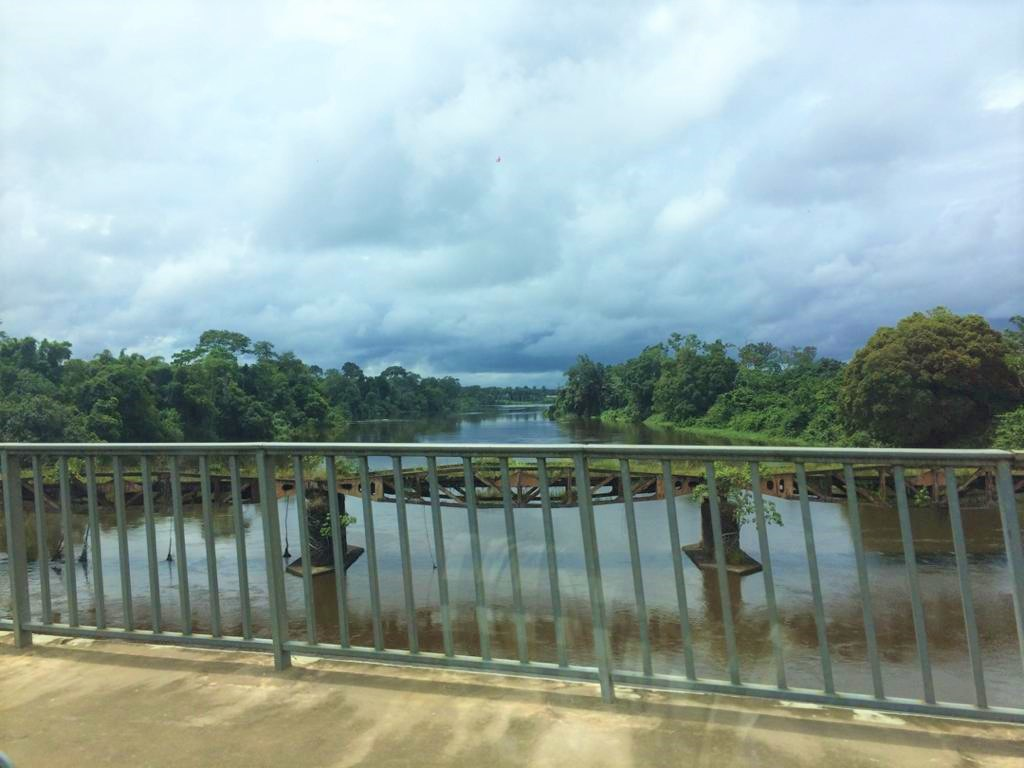
- Nyong River, South Cameroon
  Nyong River
- Lokundje River
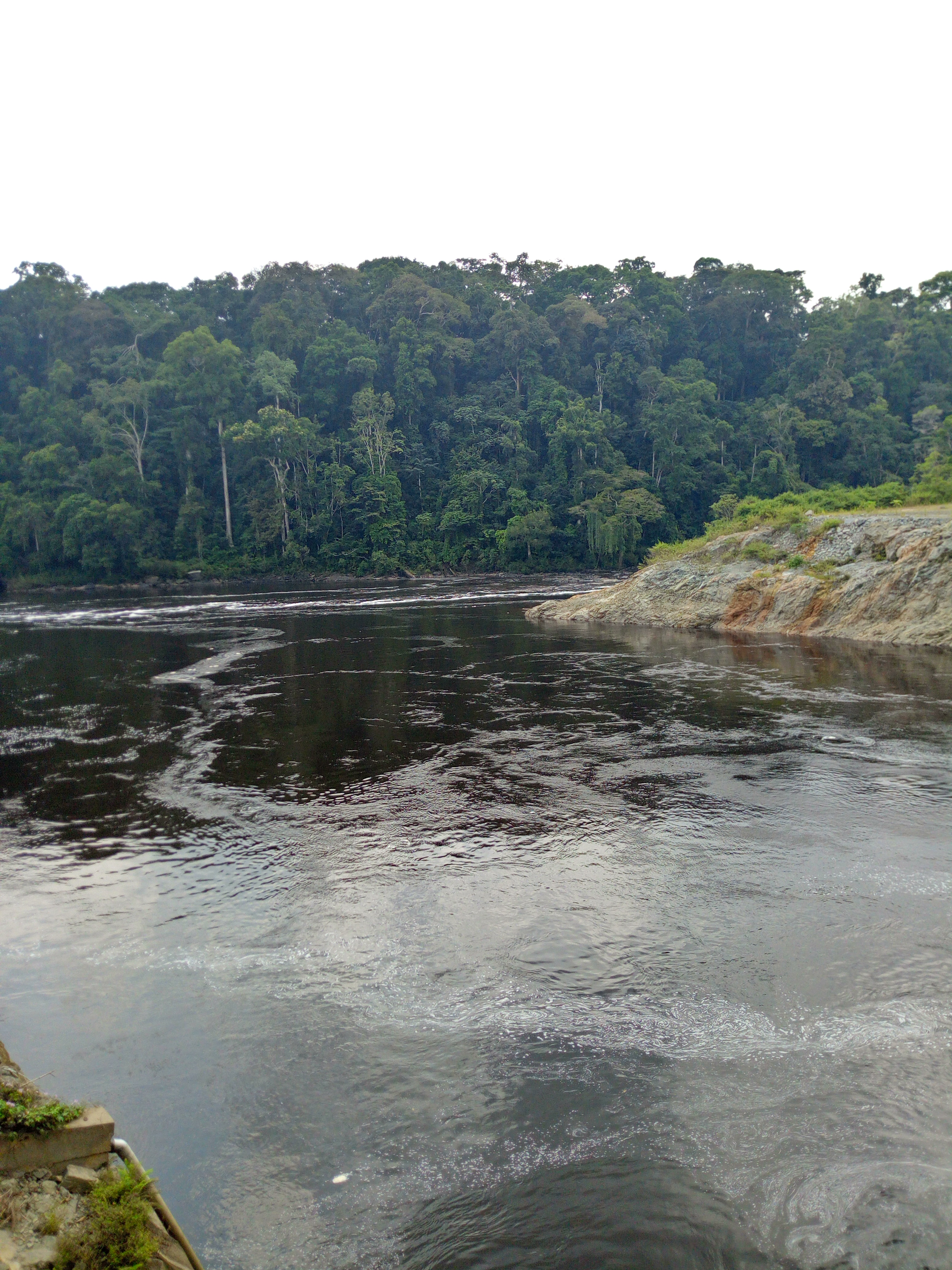
- Ntem River, Cameroon
  Campo River (Ntem River)

== Atlantic Ocean ==
- Ogooué River (Gabon)
  - Ivindo River (Gabon)
    - Aïna River (Ayina River)
      - Lélé River
- Congo River (Republic of the Congo)
  - Sangha River
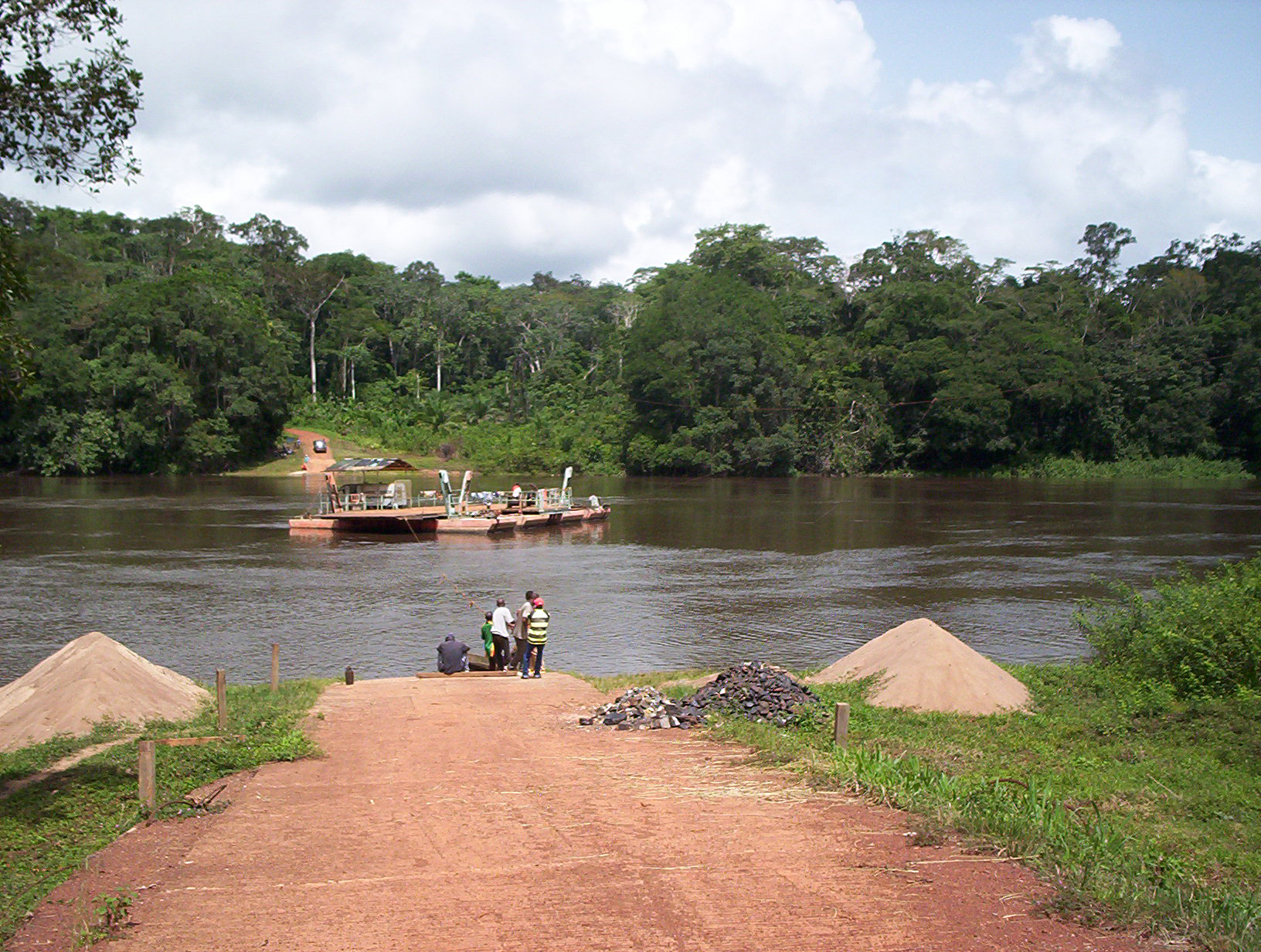
    - Dja River
      Dja River (Ngoko River)
      - Boumba River
      - Sangha River
      - Ngoko River
    - Kadéï River
      - Boumbé II River
      - Doumé River

== Lake Chad ==
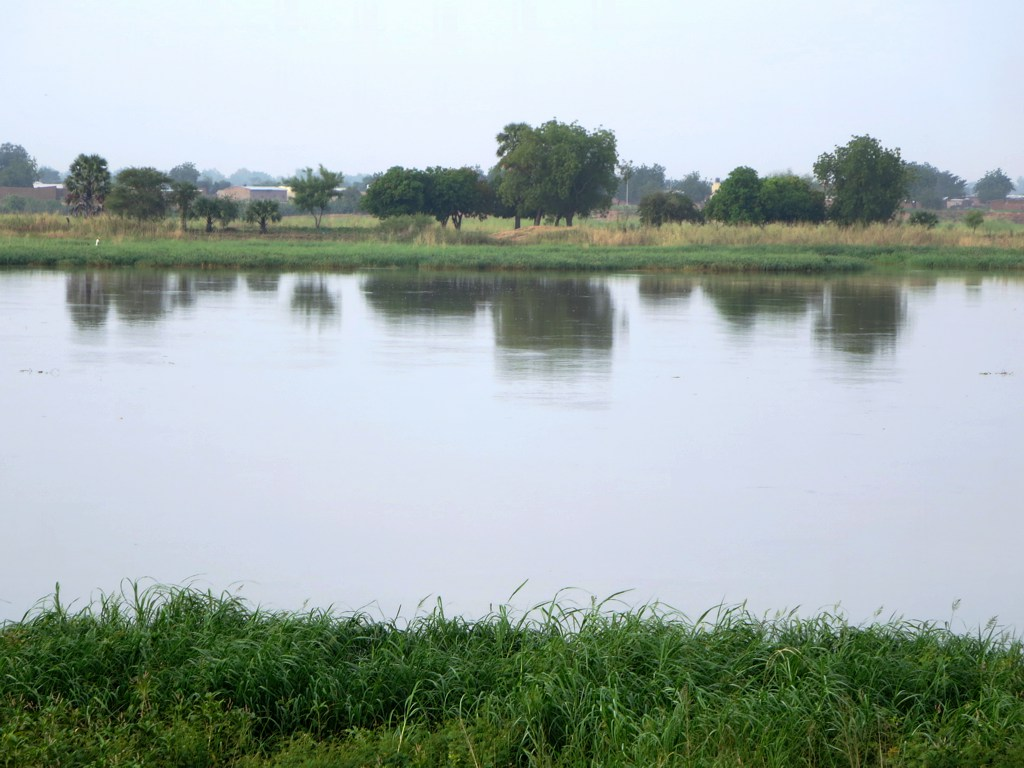
- Chari River
  Chari River
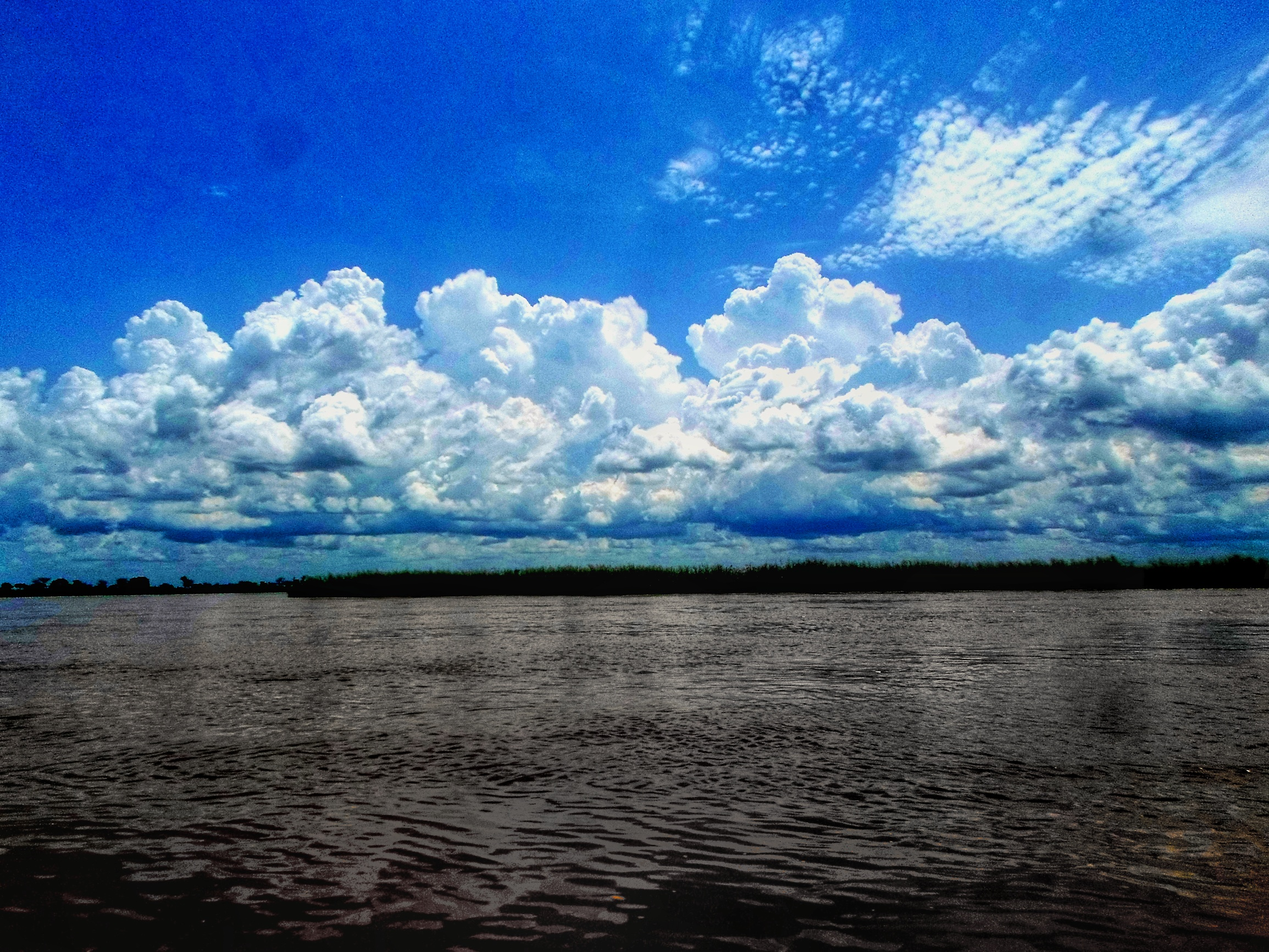
  - River Logone, Cameroon
    Logone River
    - Mbéré River
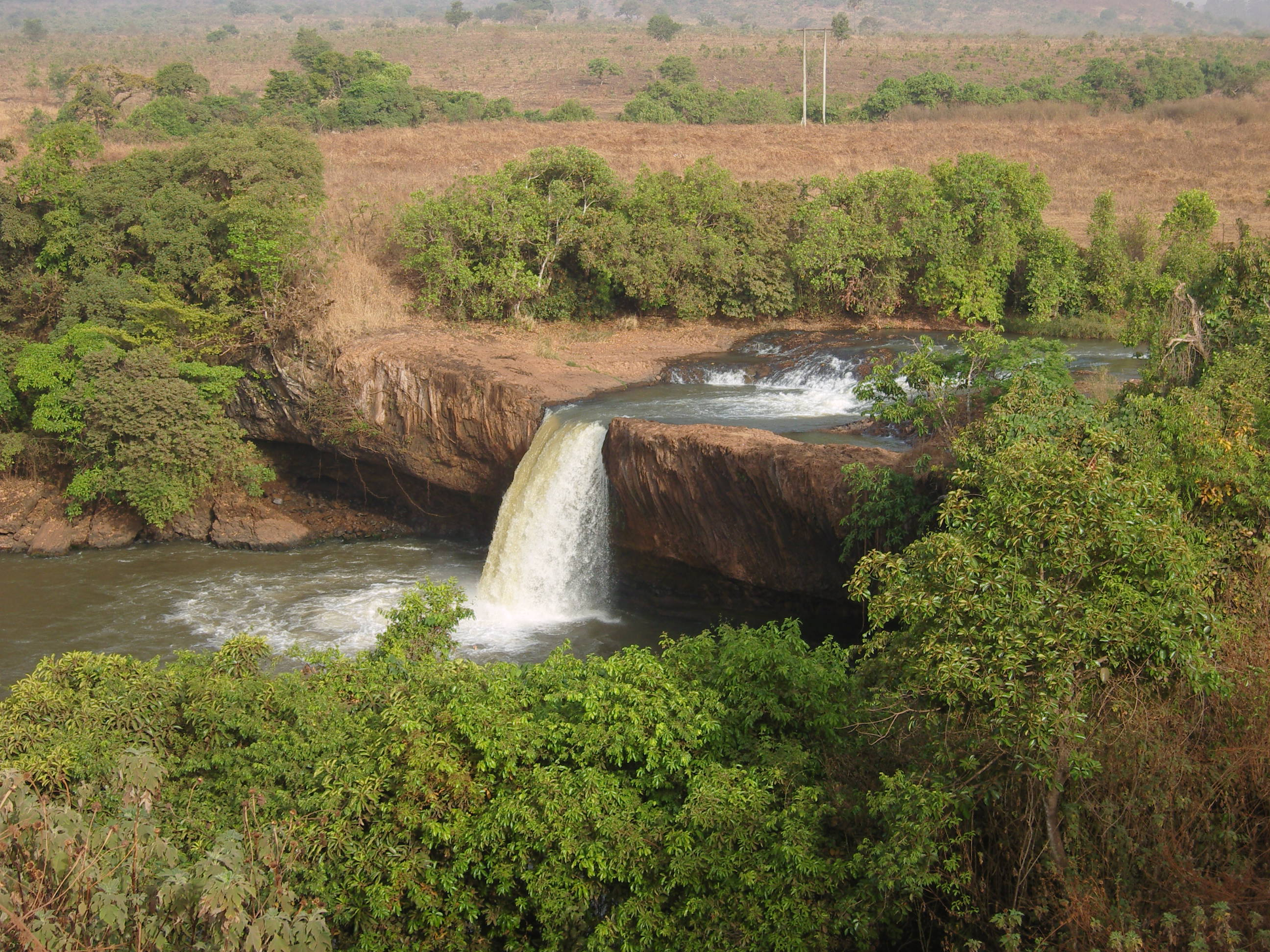
    - Vina River
      Vina River
