= Noun River =

Noun River may refer to:

- Noun River (Cameroon)
- Noun River (Morocco)
