= Mbam Djerem National Park =

National park in Cameroon

Coordinates: 5°50′N 12°45′E

Mbam et Djerem National Park
- IUCN category II (national park)
- Interactive map of Mbam et Djerem National Park

The Mbam Djerem National Park is found in Cameroon. It was established in 2000 and covers 4234.78 km^{2}.

== Overview ==
A protected area was created in January 2000 in this ecosystem in the centre of Cameroon, and named the Mbam Djerem National Park. It covers 4200 square kilometres, of which about half is lowland tropical forest, and half is Sudano-Guinean tree and woodland savannah, with a wide ecotone belt between the two. This straddling of two major vegetation zones gives Mbam Djerem probably the highest habitat diversity of all the protected areas in Cameroon. The new National Park boasts gallery forests, transitional forests and rainforests, different types of savannahs ranging from almost completely closed woodland through bush savannah, to open, seasonally flooded grasslands next to the major rivers one of which has a spectacular waterfall. Standing on any hilltop in the Park affords a view of ridge after ridge vanishing into the distance, some of them forested, some savannah, and all valleys clothed in a strip of gallery forest along the water's edge. The Park is watered by the upper Sanaga basin: the main river of the park is the Djerem, which becomes the Sanaga itself further south. This river is navigable throughout its length in the Park and allows access from the savannahs of the north into the heart of the forest.

Surveys have covered much of the Park and the major vegetation zones have been explored. The first survey took place in March 2000, and covered the eastern half of the Park. The survey team were navigating using the maps available from the Centre Geographique National, which, although printed in 1976, were produced from aerial photographs taken in the 1950s and 1960s. The maps show most of the south of the Park to be savannah. However, when the team approached the centre of the Park, although the map showed that the habitat should be bush savannah, they found themselves walking through shady woodland. On closer inspection, all the trees were not only mostly the same species (Xylopia aethiopica), they were all about the same age. Mixed in among this forest were dying individuals of typical savannah trees and bushes (such as Hymenocardia acida, Piliostigma thonningii, Bridelia ferruginea). There was little grass on the forest floor. Older local people interviewed from the villages to the west of the Park remember the area from forty years ago as grassland and bush with gallery forests along the rivers. Closed-canopy lowland forest was found much further to the east, near River Djerem. The forests of Central Africa go through long cycles of expansion and reduction, linked with long-term climatic cycles.

== The ecotone ==
Across Cameroon, and its neighbours to east and west, lies a zone known as the ecotone, or more specifically the Northern Congolian forest–savanna mosaic. This is the northern fringe of the Central African forests (Congolian rainforests), where gallery forest tendrils reach out into the great savannas of the north. The band of ecotone has, as a consequence, representatives of the flora and fauna of both forest and savanna. It has been highlighted as an area where differences within species may be the precursor to speciation.

== Rural depopulation, human activities and current threats ==
A dirt road runs along the western border of the Park, which was once the main road from the Cameroon border to Chad, over a thousand kilometres away. In the colonial era, people who used to live in what is now the Park were relocated to this road. In the last few decades, the railway line (CamRail) that connects Garoua to Yaoundé, which runs along the eastern side of the Park, has taken most of the freight and passengers away from this axis, and the young people who come from the villages that are along the old road are drifting to the cities.

There are no villages inside the Park, but it was known that there is some hunting, including larger animals such as African buffalo, waterbuck, and kob, often destined for the bushmeat markets of the distant cities. Cattle herders also seasonally use the area, especially in the more open grasslands of the northern part of the Park. The railway line is much more frequented and is a major conduit for the bushmeat trade, funnelling wild animal meat from the centre of Cameroon down to the populous centres of Yaounde and Bertoua.

== Wildlife ==
As a precursor to management, the conservation potential of Mbam Djerem was assessed for large and small mammals, birds, habitats, and the degree of use by humans. Of particular interest was the status of the elephant population in the area, including any evidence of seasonal movements. The large mammal and bird surveys were carried out by WCS, helped by Deborah Pires who surveyed the bats and small mammals. The Birdlife Important Bird Area team also surveyed the northern part of the Park in 2000. Four major surveys were carried out, covering all four quarters of the Park.

The fauna is very diverse. As in many Central African sites, large mammal abundance increases with increased distance from the road and the villages. True savannah species such as olive baboon Papio anubis and common warthog Phacochoerus africanus occur literally within metres of species of true forest animals, including crested mona monkey Cercopithecus pogonias and red river hog Potamochoerus porcus, which here are found right up to the edges of the savannah. All three species of pig occur in the Park (red river hog, warthog, and giant forest hog Hylochoerus meinertzhageni), and there are hippo Hippopotamus amphibius at several sites along the Djerem river. In addition, there are species of forest-savannah mosaic habitats such as bushbuck Tragelaphus scriptus and yellow-backed duiker Cephalophus sylvicultor. Within a few hundred metres it is possible to see signs of kob Kobus kob, waterbuck Kobus ellipsiprymnus, and forest buffalo Syncerus caffer nanus, and to hear putty-nosed monkeys Cercopithecus nictitans -a strange mixture of forest and savannah wildlife all at one site. Ungulate diversity is high: apart from those mentioned above there are bongo and sitatunga (Tragelaphus euryceros and T. scriptus), several species of duiker (confirmed are blue, red-flanked, common, black-fronted). The presence of at least ten species of primate, including chimpanzees Pan troglodytes has been confirmed by the study teams either by direct observation of animals or their signs or by hearing their vocalisations, and local hunters suggested there could be still more.

One of the most vulnerable animals in the Park is elephant. They occur in the south-centre of the Park but seem to be completely absent in the north (both east and west sides of the Park). Gorillas occur outside the Park, to the southeast, in the Lom-Pangar area (Fotso et al. 2002) but are not found in the Park. The area where they occur is now Deng Deng National Park.

The first bird list for Mbam Djerem, a synthesis of the Fotso and Bobo/ Languy surveys, numbered 360 species, and, as for the mammal fauna, included both true savannah species such as the brown-rumped bunting Emberiza affinis, black-bellied firefinch Lagonosticta rara, lesser blue-eared starling Lamprotornis chloropterus, white-collared starling Grafisia torquata, brubru Nilaus afer and yellow penduline tit Anthoscopus parvulus and true forest species such as some of the hornbills: black and white casqued hornbill Bycanistes subcylindricus, black casqued hornbill Ceratogymna atrata, red-billed dwarf hornbill Lophoceros camurus, and passerines such as the red-tailed bristlebill Bleda syndactyla, green-tailed bristlebill Bleda eximia, white-tailed alethe Alethe diademata, orange-breasted forest robin Stiphrornis erythrothorax, red-tailed greenbul Criniger calurus, spotted honeyguide Indicator maculatus (Fotso 2000). The Bamenda Apalis Apalis bamendae was discovered to be relatively widespread throughout the area (Bobo & Languy 2000 a,b; Fotso 2000) - this bird had previously thought to have been restricted to a small area in the Bamenda Highlands of Northwest Cameroon, two hundred kilometres to the west of Mbam Djerem.

The Park has not only a wide diversity of habitats, flora and fauna, but also of seasonal extremes of temperature. In the dry season, bushfires reduce the grasses to ash. Rivers and swampy valleys dry up completely. This seasonality has important implications for the animals that require frequent water: they are obliged to remain near the larger rivers for several months at a time. Normally water is not a limiting factor for humid forest species, but the forest animals here may be on the edge of their physical limits. This information is well known by hunters, who use the grassy plains near the major rivers during the wet season; kob, buffalo and waterbuck are found here during this season, and hunters travel in from the railway line to transport meat out to the east.

== Conservation issues ==
It is clear that the Mbam Djerem National Park contains a representative bloc of the habitat diversity that comprises the ecotone area of Cameroon and its neighbours. The large mammal fauna, now almost gone in West Africa, is still present, although threatened by commercial bushmeat (and some ivory) hunting. Local people in the area have few other activities that bring in money: profits on the small-scale agricultural products grown in the area are much lower than those gained by selling meat. The main methods of commercial hunting are thick wire snares aimed at the larger ungulates, and gun hunting, although small game hunting is carried out using thin wire snares near the villages (often outside the Park border).

== Bibliography ==
- Bobo, K. S. and Languy, M. (2000) Inventaire ornithologique dans le Parc National du Mbam-Djerem. Unpublished report to Cameroon Ornithological Club and BirdLife International. 34pp.
- Bobo, K. S., Njabo, Y. K., Anye, N. D. and Languy, M. ((in prep)) Status and distribution of Bamenda Apalis in Cameroon, Central Africa.
- Fotso, R.C. (2000) Mbam Djerem National Park. Bird survey, March 2000. WCS-Cameroon
- Fotso, R.C., Eno Nku, M., & Groves, J. (2002) Distribution and conservation status of gorilla population in the forests around Belabo, eastern province, Cameroon. Report to: Cameroon Oil Transportation Company (COTCO)
- Maisels, F. (2003). Mbam Djerem National Park. Conservation status, October 2003. Large mammals and human impact. Final report. WCS-Cameroon.
- Maisels, F., Fotso, R.C. & Hoyle, D. (2000) Mbam Djerem National Park. Conservation status, March 2000. Large mammals and human impact. Final report. WCS-Cameroon.
