= Mpem and Djim National Park =

National park in Cameroon

- Mpem et Djim National Park; Parc national de Mpem et Djim
- IUCN category II (national park)
- Location within Cameroon
- Location: Centre Region, Cameroon
- Coordinates: 5°09′47″N 11°42′34″E
- Area: 974.8 km^{2} (376.4 sq mi)
- Designation: National park
- Designated: 2004

Mpem and Djim National Park is a protected area in Cameroon. The park was designated by the government of Cameroon in 2004, and covers an area of 974.8 km^{2}.

== Geography ==
The park is located in Cameroon's Centre Region. The park is bounded by the Mpem and Djim rivers, which are tributaries of the Sanaga River.

== Climate ==
The park has a tropical savanna climate. Temperature ranges from 22º and 29º C. There are four seasons – a long dry season from mid-November to mid-March, a short rainy season from mid-March to the end of June, a short dry season from July to August, and a long rainy season from September to mid-November. Average annual rainfall ranges from 1800 and 2000 mm, concentrated in the two rainy seasons.

== Flora and fauna ==
The park is in the Northern Congolian forest–savanna mosaic ecoregion. The forest–savanna mosaic is a transitional zone between the equatorial Congolian forests to the south and the Sudanian savanna to the north. The park includes areas of forest, generally along rivers, with savanna and woodland in the upland areas. The savannas have an understory of grasses, commonly Bokassa grass (Chromolaena odorata) and Imperata cylindrica. Savanna trees include species of Albizzia and Lophira. Dominant forest trees include Piptadeniastrum africanum, Milicia excelsa, Pterocarpus soyauxii, Nauclea diderrichii, Alstonia boonei, Mansonia altissima, Garcinia kola, Entandrophragma utile, Entandrophragma candollei, and Lovoa trichilioides.

79 native species of mammals have been recorded in the park. Threatened large mammals include leopards (Panthera pardus), chimpanzees (Pan troglodytes), hippopotamus (Hippopotamus amphibius), and African bush elephants (Loxodonta africana). There are 14 species of bats, including both forest and savanna species.
