= Fifinda =

- Town
- Location in Cameroon
- Coordinates: 3°15′N 10°03′E
- Country: Cameroon
- Region: South Region

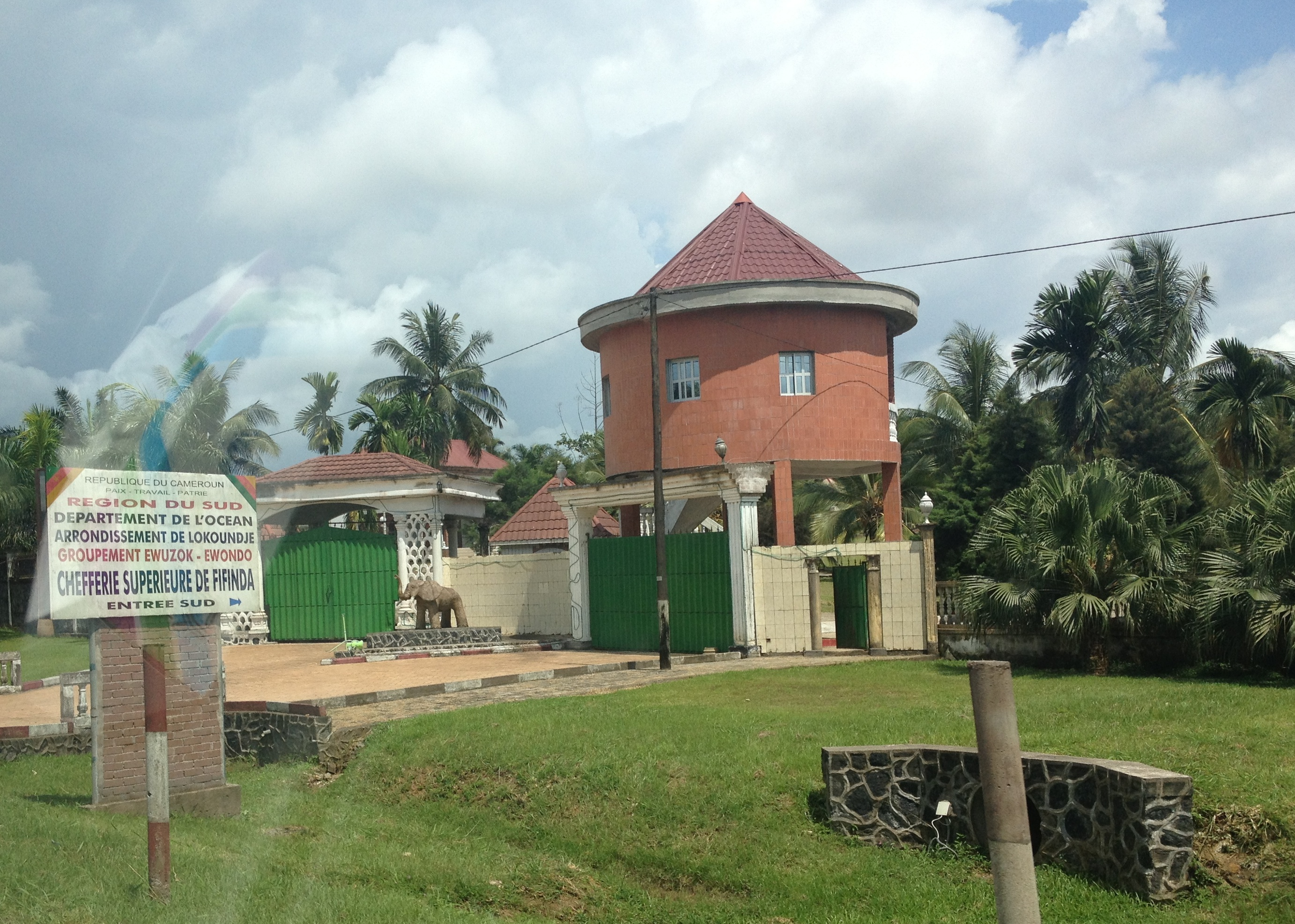
Fifinda south gate

Fifinda is a small town in the South Region of south-western Cameroon. It is located along the Edéa-Kribi road (National Route 7), northeast of Kribi and Bipindi and southwest of Elogbatindi. The area is surrounded by marshland, and the Lokundje River flows nearby. It hosts also the Chefferie Superieure of the Evouzok Ewondo Tribe ruled by the paramount chief Innocent Ondoa Nkou. Other personalities linked to the town are the latter's younger brother Ambassador Anatole Marie Nkou and his cousin Gabriel Bengono CEO of the Société immobiliere du Cameroun.

== See also ==
- Communes of Cameroon
