= Elogbatindi =

- Village
- Location in Cameroon
- Coordinates: 3.45°N 10.133°E
- Country: Cameroon
- Region: South Region

Elogbatindi is a village in South Region of Cameroon, located to the south-western end of the Douala Edéa Wildlife Reserve, on the Edéa-Kribi road (National Route 7), and is connected to Bipindi and Fifinda to the southwest. It lies to the east of the Sanaga River. It is inhabited by Lala Pygmies, and has a number of Baka camps.

== See also ==
- Communes of Cameroon
