= Ndjim River =

Watercourse in Cameroon

Coordinates: 4.638226°N 11.402680°E

The Ndjim River is a river in Cameroon. It is a tributary of the Mbam River, and it is a part of the Sanaga River system. The river runs through Goura.

== See also ==
- List of rivers of Cameroon
