= Vina River =

Tributary of Logone river

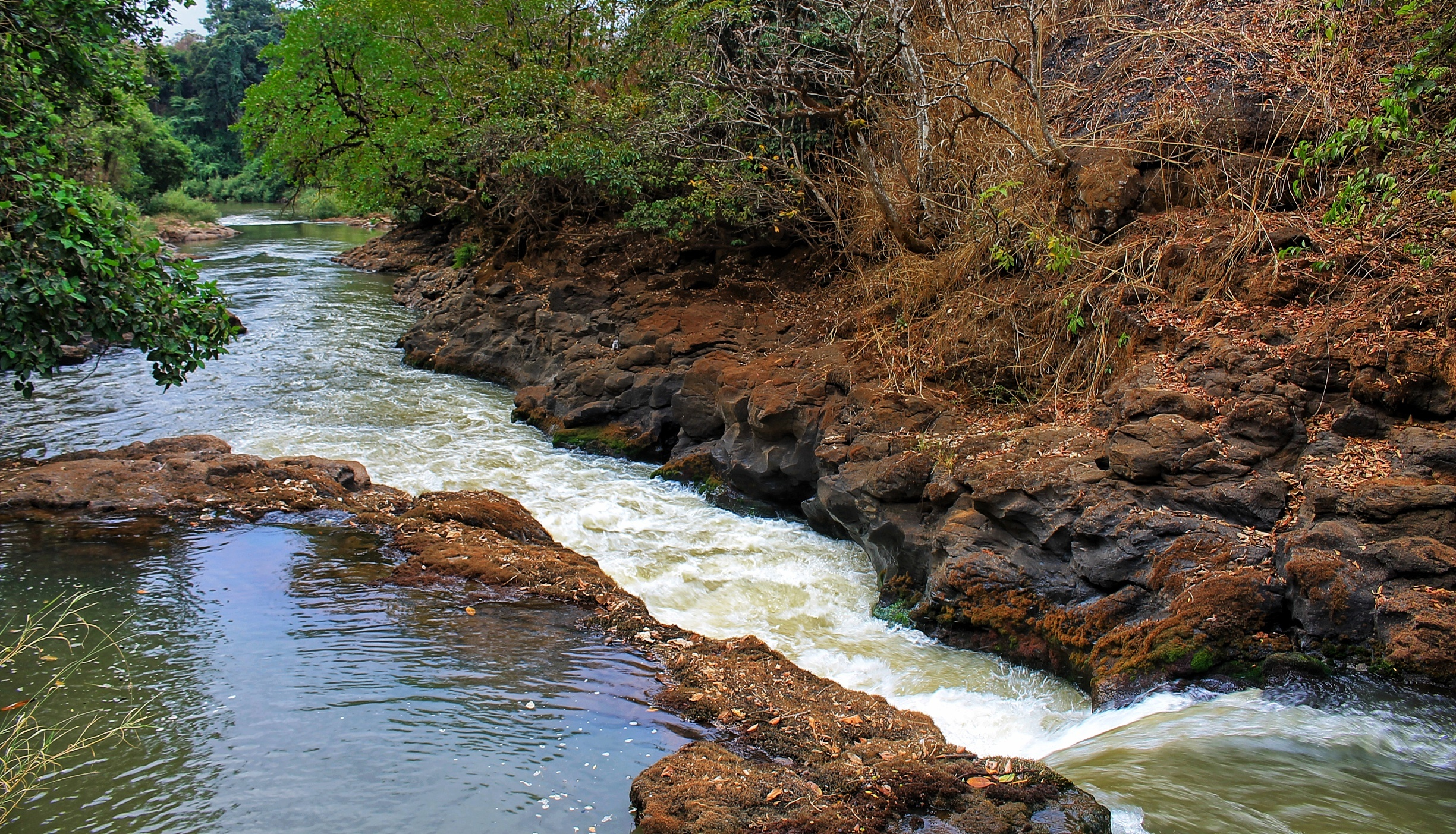
The waterfalls of the Vina in the city of N'Gaoundéré. Region: Adamaoua

The Vina River is a river in Cameroon. It is a tributary of the Logone River.

== See also ==
- List of rivers of Cameroon
