= Goura, Centre Region =

Coordinates: 12.3328°N 14.5264°E

Goura
- Village
- Interactive map of Goura
- Country: Cameroon
- Region: Centre
- Time zone: UTC+1 (WAT)

Goura is a village in Centre Province, Cameroon. Cocoa production is a source of income for residents in Goura. The Ndjim River runs through Goura.

== See also ==
- List of municipalities of Cameroon
