= Rio del Rey =

Estuary in Cameroon

Coordinates: 4°30′59″N 8°44′59″E

Designations

Ramsar Wetland
- Official name: Estuaire du Rio Del Rey
- Designated: 20 May 2010
- Reference no.: 1908

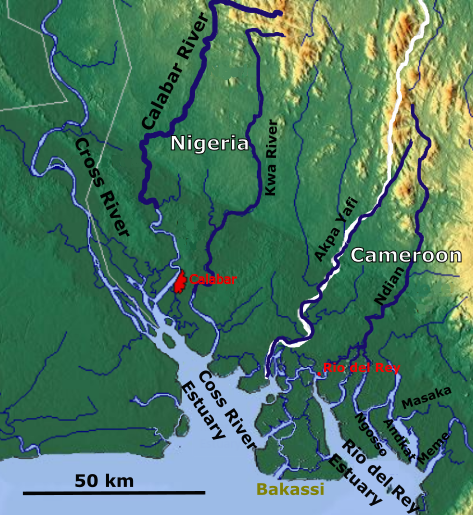
Rio Del Rey estuary (right)

The Rio del Rey (also called Rio del Ray) is an estuary of a drainage basin in West Africa in Cameroon. It is located in the eastern area of the Niger River system. The Cameroon volcanic line separates Rio Del Rey from the Douala basin. Rio del Rey has been described as an estuary in which "the two rivers N'dian and Massake flow out". The mouth is close to the border with Nigeria and has connections to the Cross River estuary from which it is separated by the Bakassi peninsula. The Rio del Rey estuary has been designated as a Ramsar site since 2010.

== See also ==
- List of rivers of Cameroon
