= Anatole Marie Nkou =

Cameroonian diplomat

Anatole Fabien Marie Nkou (born 21 June 1948) is a Cameroonian diplomat and currently Cameroon's Ambassador to the United Nations Office at Geneva.

Anatole Nkou, who was born in Brazzaville, is the son of the late Prosper Marcel Ondoa Nkou (1905-1978), a Franco-Cameroonian landowner and Marine Officer of the Evouzok-Ewondo tribe. Ambassador Nkou's father, the grandson of a powerful Paramount Chief on friendly terms with the then French Prefect of kribi, enjoyed the extremely rare privilege to be sent with a handful of other young Cameroonian princes (his cousin) to a Boarding School in France (Normandy) in 1920. He is also the younger brother of His Majesty Innocent Ondoa Nkou, Paramount Chief of the Evouzok-Ewondo tribe (Fifinda) and Vice General Manager of the BICEC Cameroun groupe BPCE. Ambassador Nkou graduated with a Doctorate of the International Relations Institute of Cameroon in 1972. He also graduated from the ENAM of Cameroon in the same year. He has a doctorate in History and International Relations.

After working in several diplomatic missions in Beijing, Moscow, Madrid, Addis Ababa, among other countries, Nkou became Cameroon's Ambassador to the United Nations Office at Geneva in 2007.

Father of 4, he is married to Therese Marie Nkou daughter of the first Cameroonian Head of State André-Marie Mbida.
