= Lokundje River =

River in Cameroon

Coordinates: 3.19556°N 9.93583°E

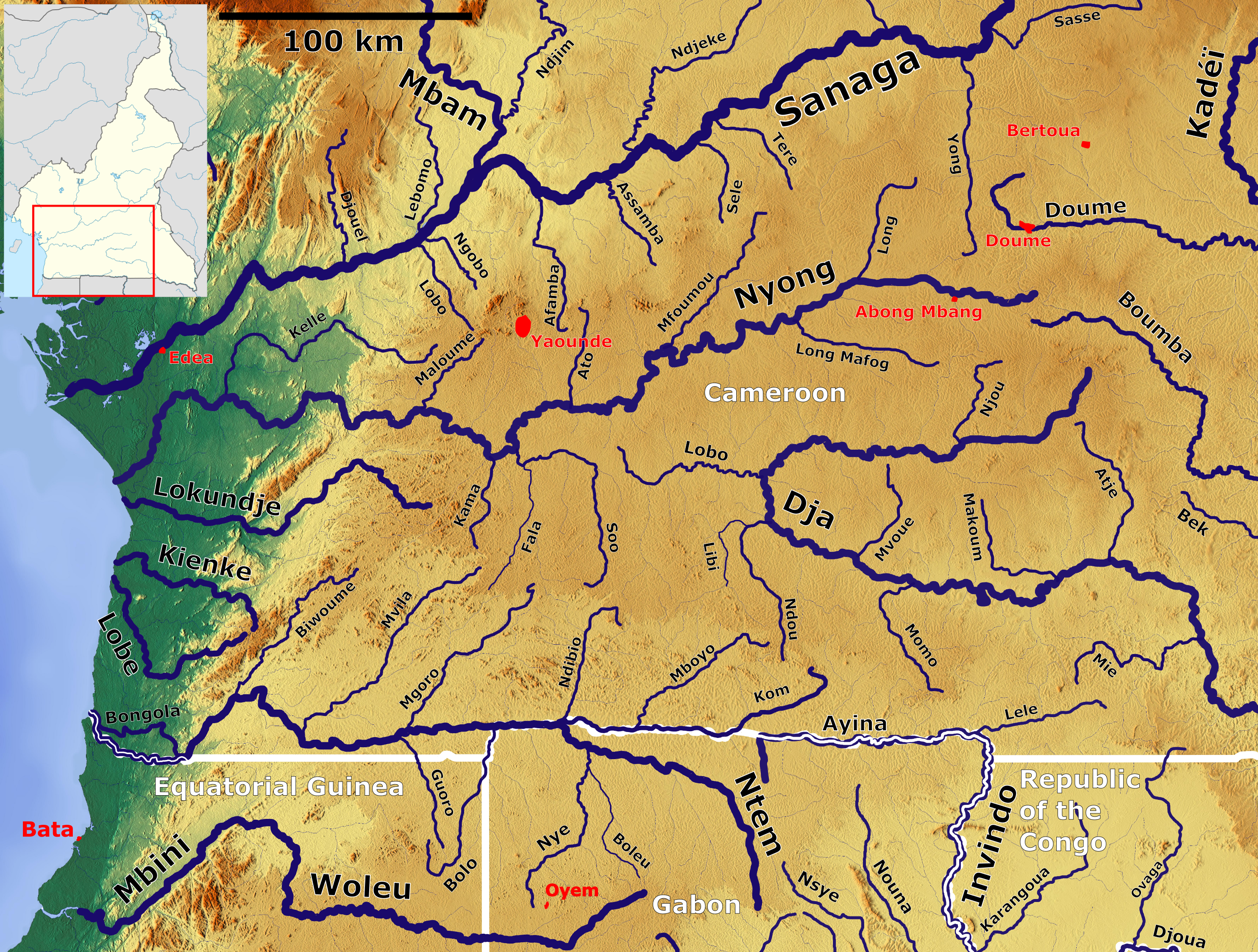
The Lokundje in southern Cameroon (left)

The Lokundje is a river of southwestern Cameroon. It flows near Bipindi and Fifinda and the Ebea Falls. The river played a military role in the French battle against Germany during World War I.
