= Deng Deng National Park =

National park in Cameroon

- IUCN category II (national park)
- Location within Cameroon
- Location: East Region, Cameroon
- Coordinates: 5°21′2″N 13°26′30″E
- Area: 682.64 km^{2} (263.57 sq mi)
- Designation: National Park
- Designated: 2010

Deng Deng National Park is a national park in Cameroon. Established in 2010, it covers an area of 682.64 km^{2} (263.57 sq mi).

== Geography ==
Deng Deng National Park is located on the Sanaga River. Lom Pangar Reservoir lies east of the park.

Deng Deng National Park is located 50 km (31 mi) southeast of Mbam Djerem National Park.

== Flora and fauna ==
Deng Deng National Park is in the Northern Congolian forest-savanna mosaic ecoregion.

Deng Deng National Park is home to the northernmost known population of the Critically Endangered western lowland gorilla (Gorilla gorilla gorilla). The park is also home to chimpanzees (Pan troglodytes), African forest elephants (Loxodonta cyclotis), hippopotamus (Hippopotamus amphibius), giant pangolin (Smutsia gigantea), and yellow-backed duiker (Cephalophus silvicultor).
