= Noun River (Cameroon) =

River in Cameroon

Noun
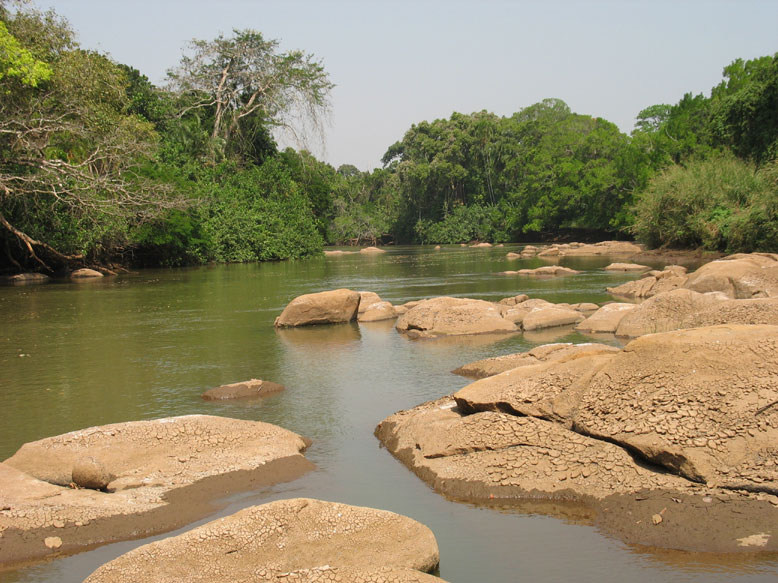
- The Noun River, during the dry season, a few kilometers after Bandjoun

The Noun River is a river in the West Province of Cameroon. It arises at Lake Oku (6°11′34″N 10°27′14″E) and flows south, it is joined by the Monoun River and flows south in the valley between the mountains Ngotsetzezan and Mount Yahou. It turns east at about 5° N latitude. Its mouth is at the Mbam River (4°54′42″N 11°06′02″E), which itself is a tributary of the Sanaga River.

It forms the boundary between the Bamiléké area and the Bamun area, and played a key role in the history of the Bamiléké people.

The Noun River was dammed at Bamendjing in 1975 (5°41′55″N 10°30′03″E) creating a reservoir with the same name. At its maximum the reservoir is 32 km (20 mi) long and 27 km (17 mi) wide. Its surface area varies between 150 km^{2} (57.9 mi^{2}) and 300 km^{2} (116 mi^{2}).

The Noun River hosts hippopotamus that can be seen all year long, in the wild parts of the river, along with many birds, such as the palm nut vulture, the bee-eater, the hammerkop, and the kingfisher.

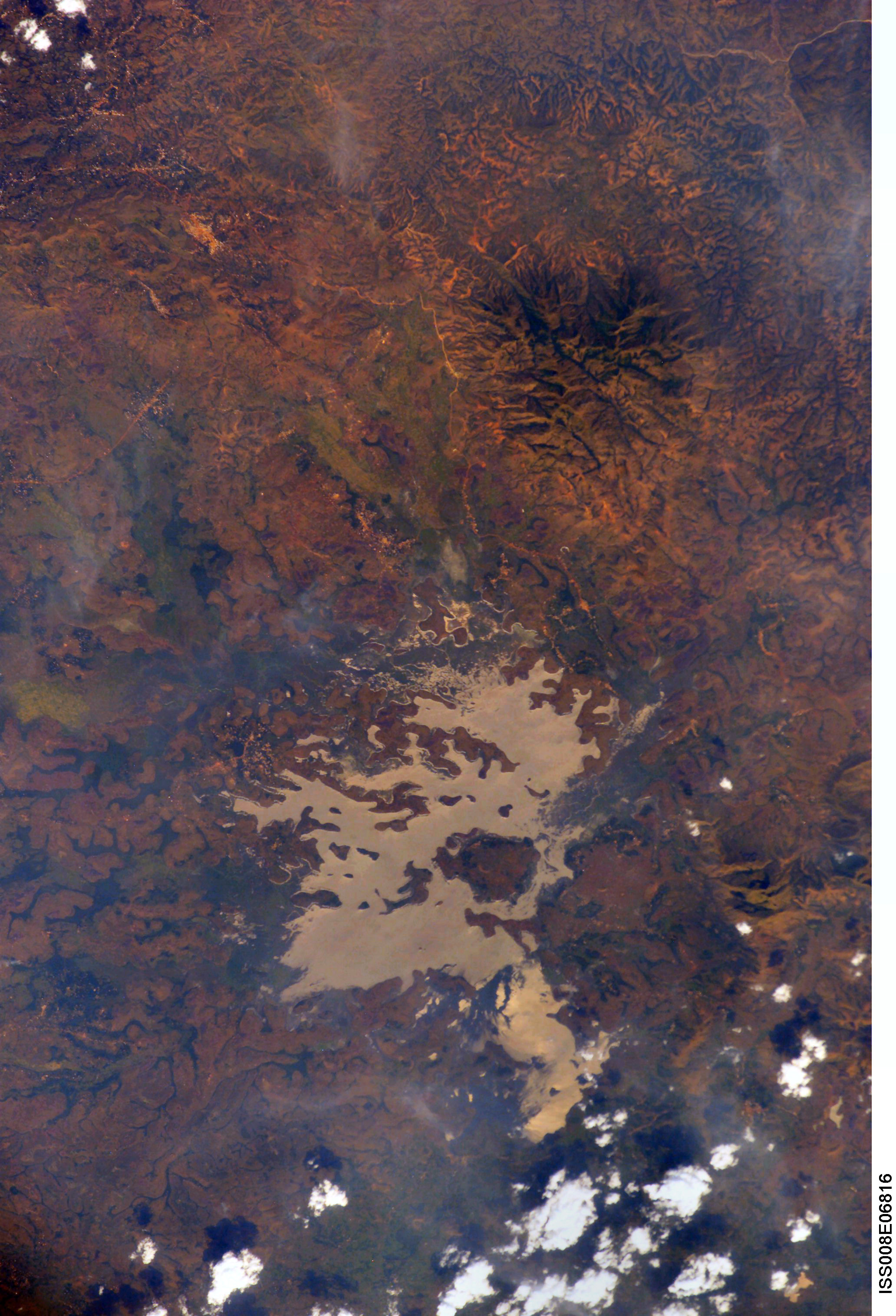
Bamendjing Reservoir with Mount Yahou in upper right, NASA 2003

== Gallery ==
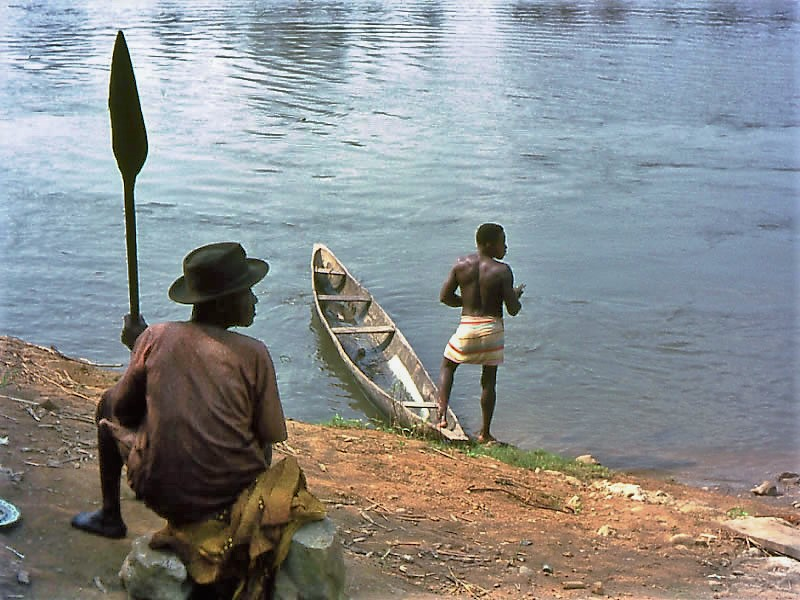
Canoe on Noun River.

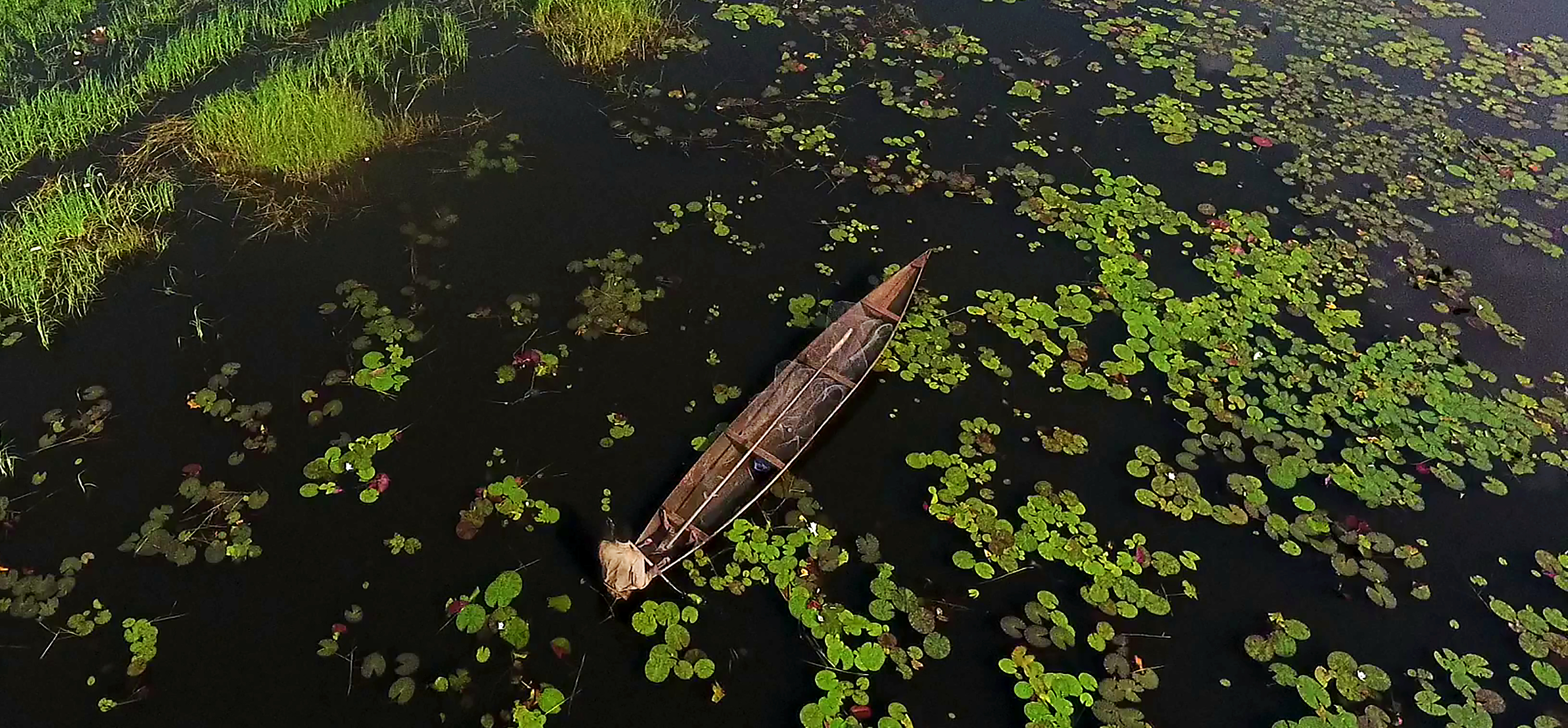
Canoe

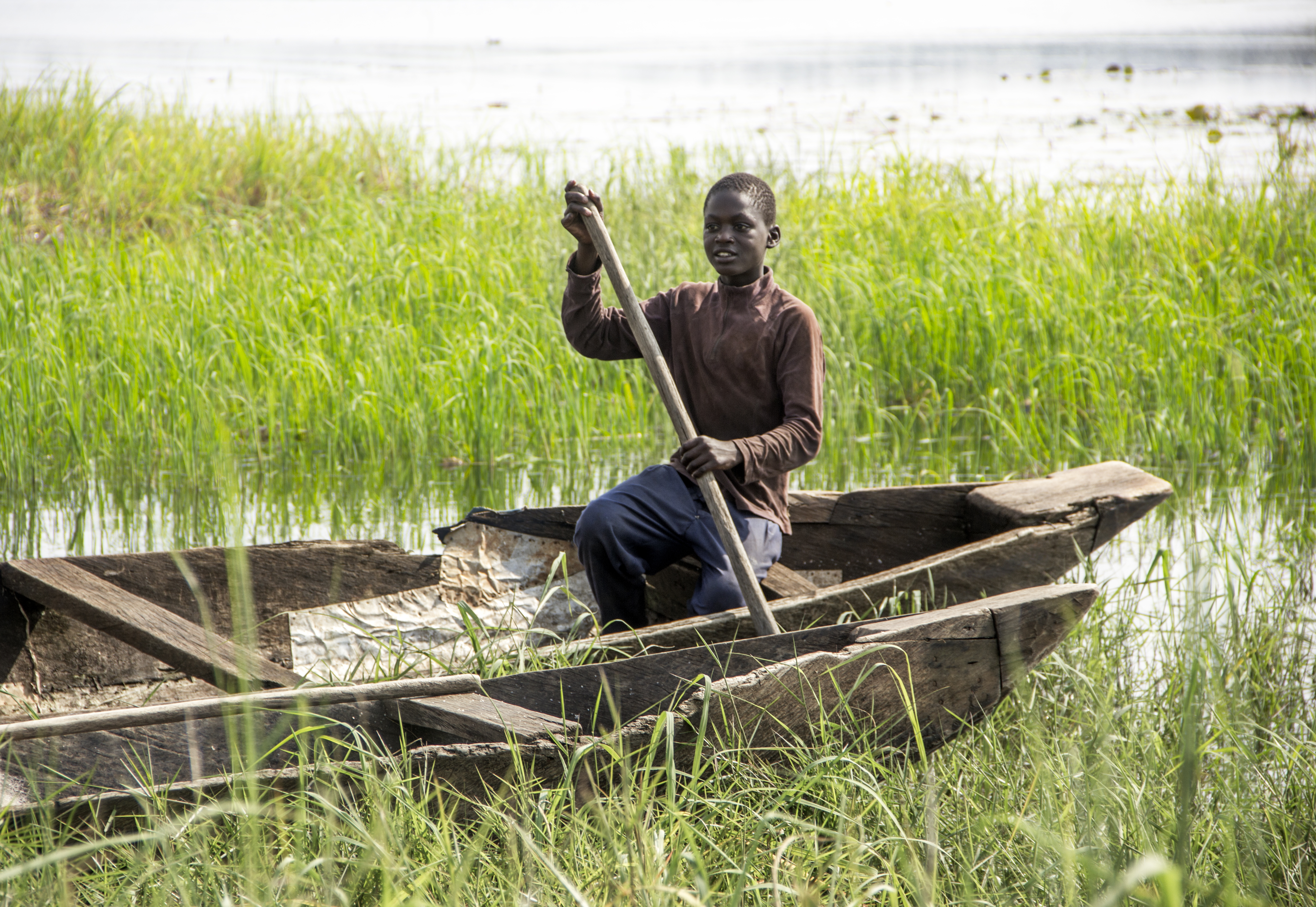
Young boy on Noun River in Bamendjing.

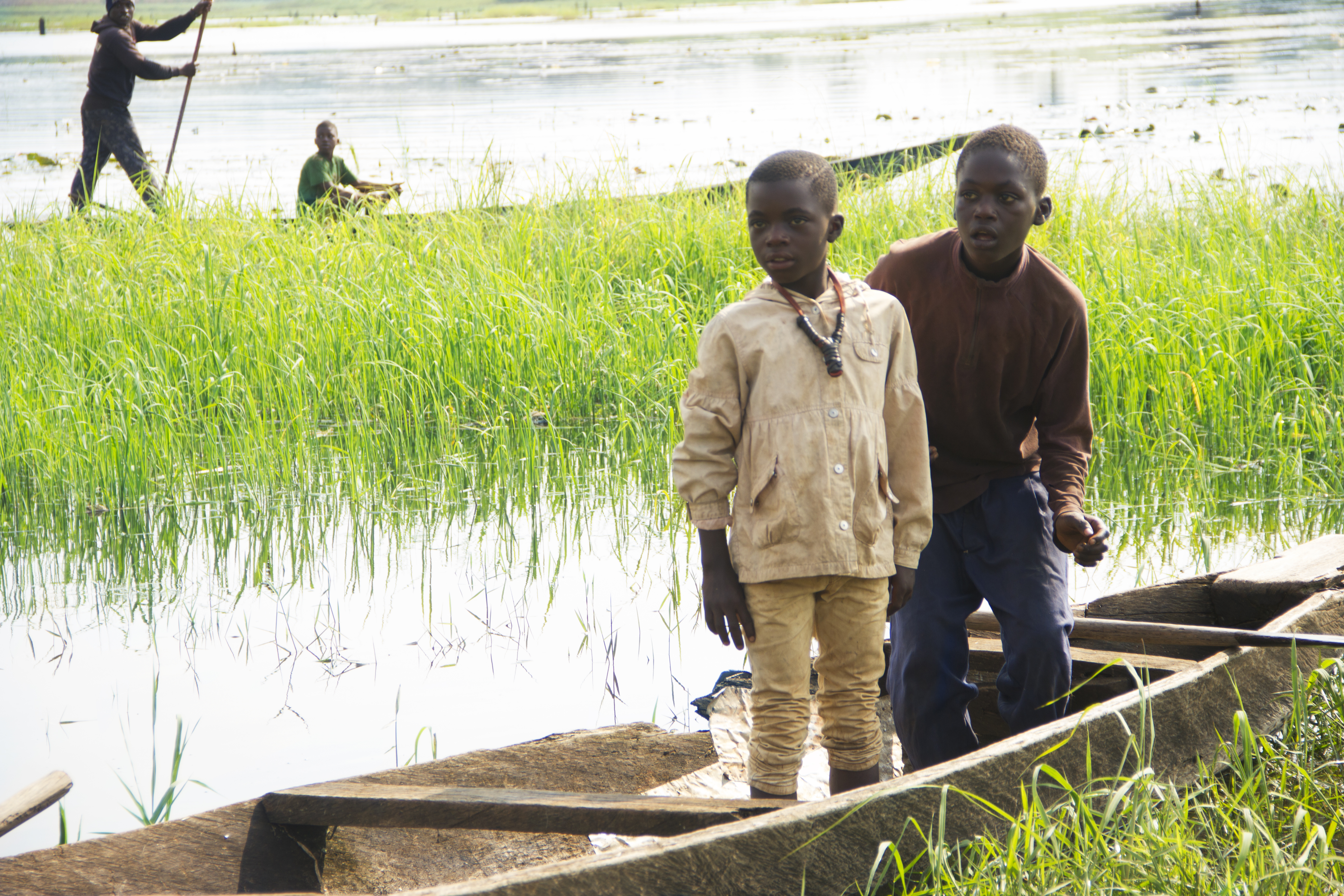
Children in locally made Canoes
