= Mbam River =

River in Cameroon

Coordinates: 4°22′44″N 11°15′50″E

The Mbam River is the largest tributary of the Sanaga River in Cameroon. It has a total length of 548 km (341 mi) and has a total drainage basin of 38,000 km^{2} (15,000 sq mi).

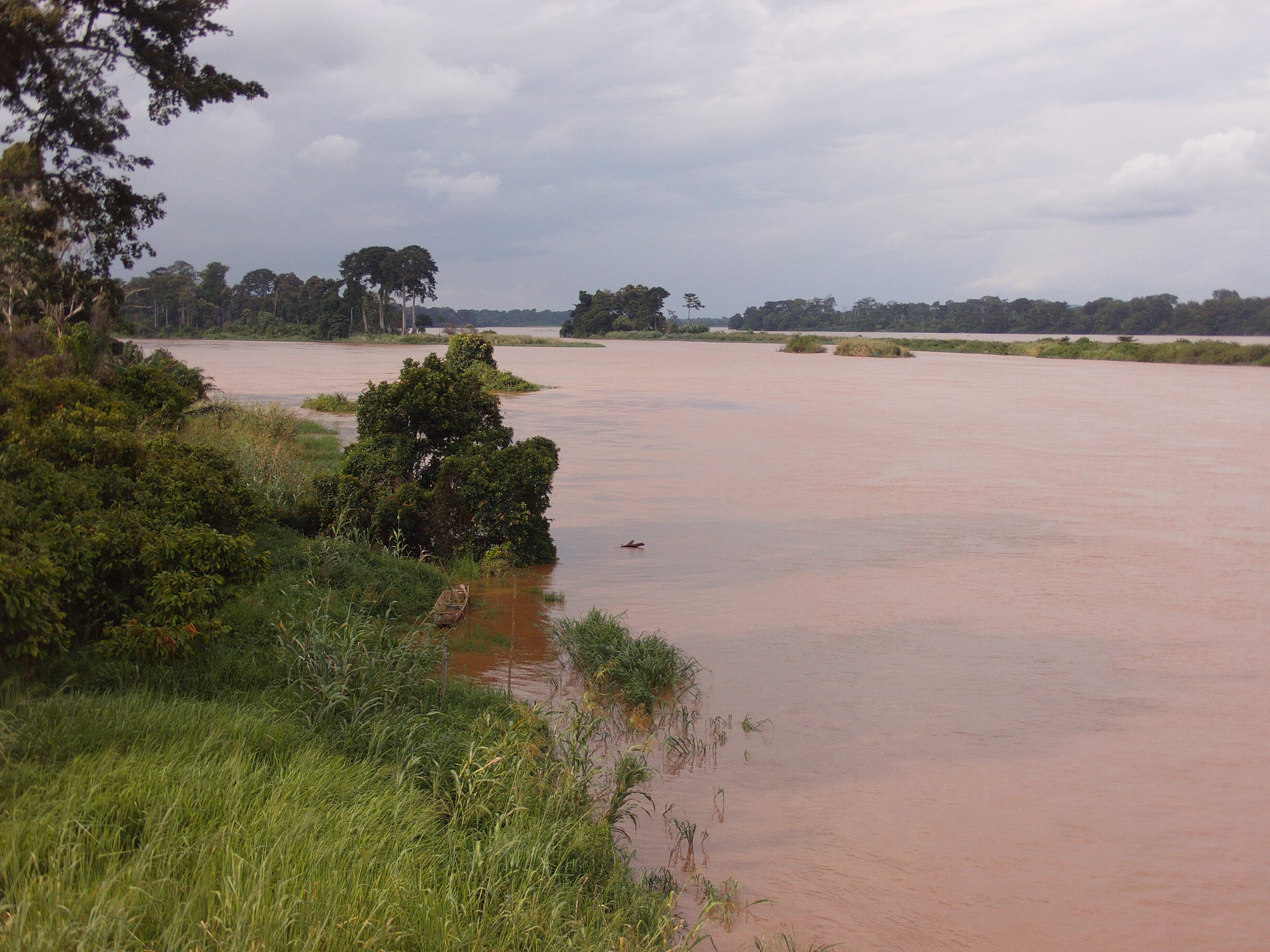
Water mouth of the Mbam river (left) into the Sanaga river near Ebebda

It flows from the Adamawa Plateau and receives the Kim and Ndjim rivers on its left bank and later the Noun River at its right bank before its confluence with the Sanaga River.

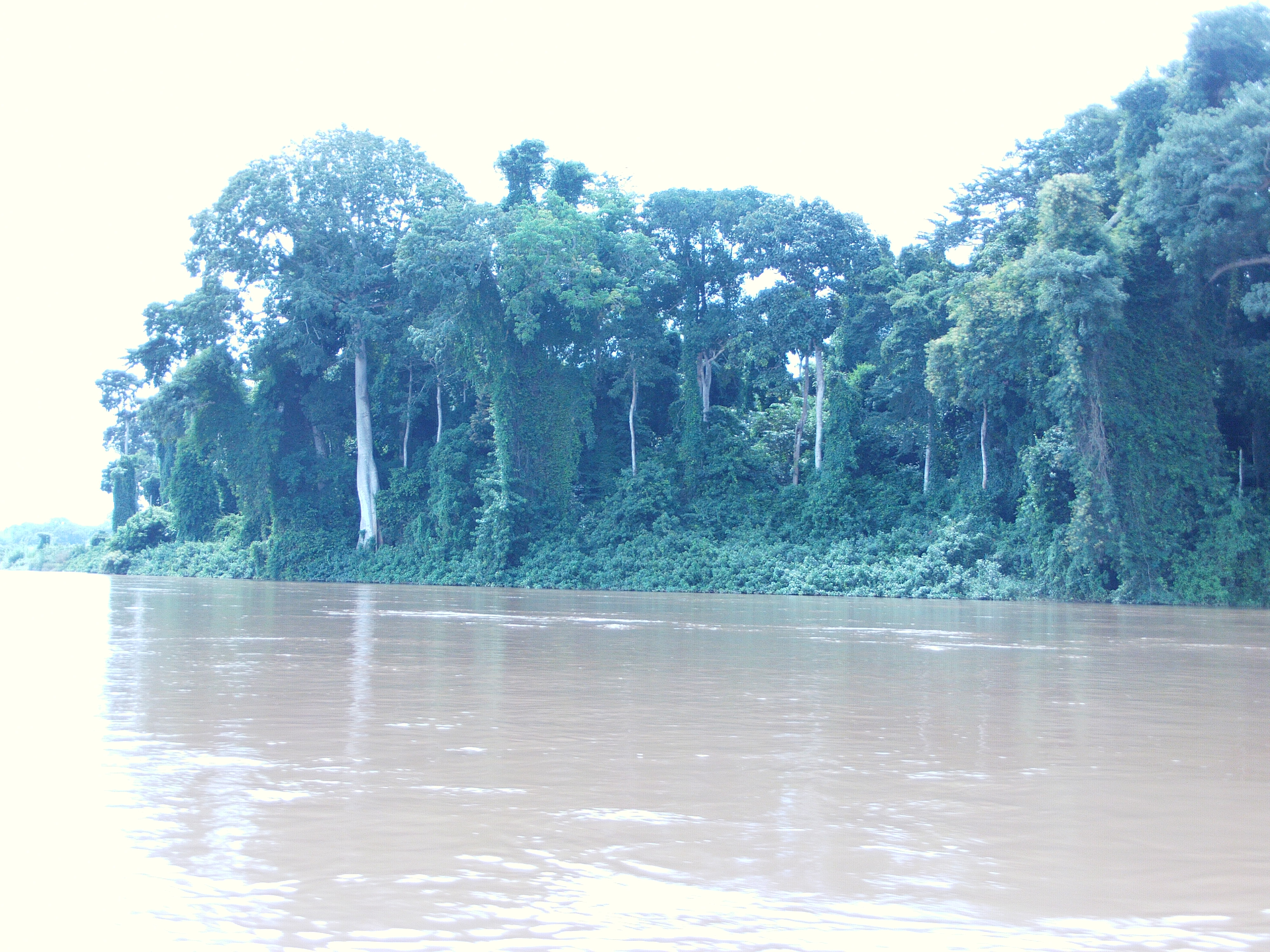
Gallery forest on an island of the Mbam river near Bafia (Cameroon)

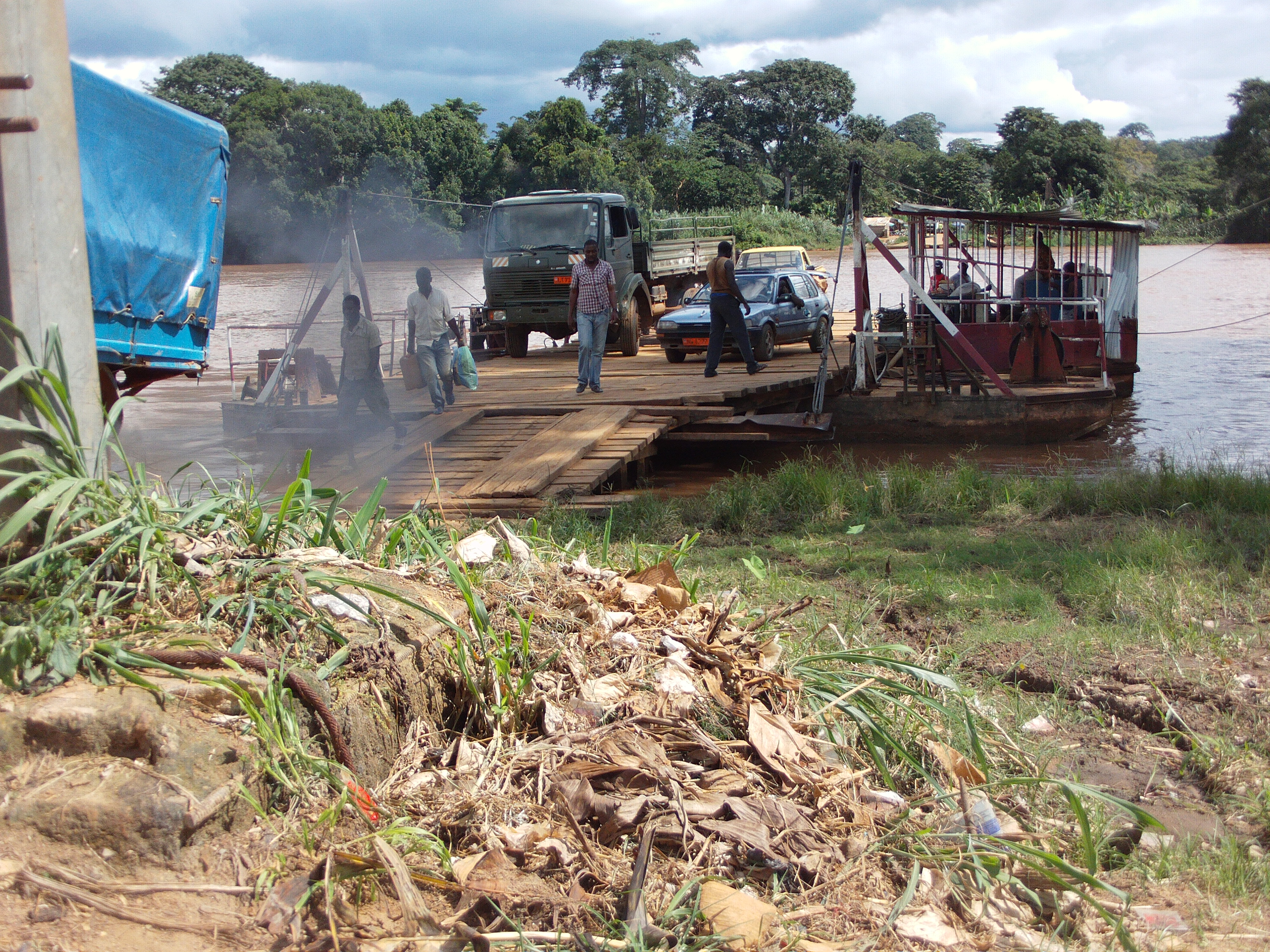
Guerima ferry across the Mbam river near Bafia (Cameroon)

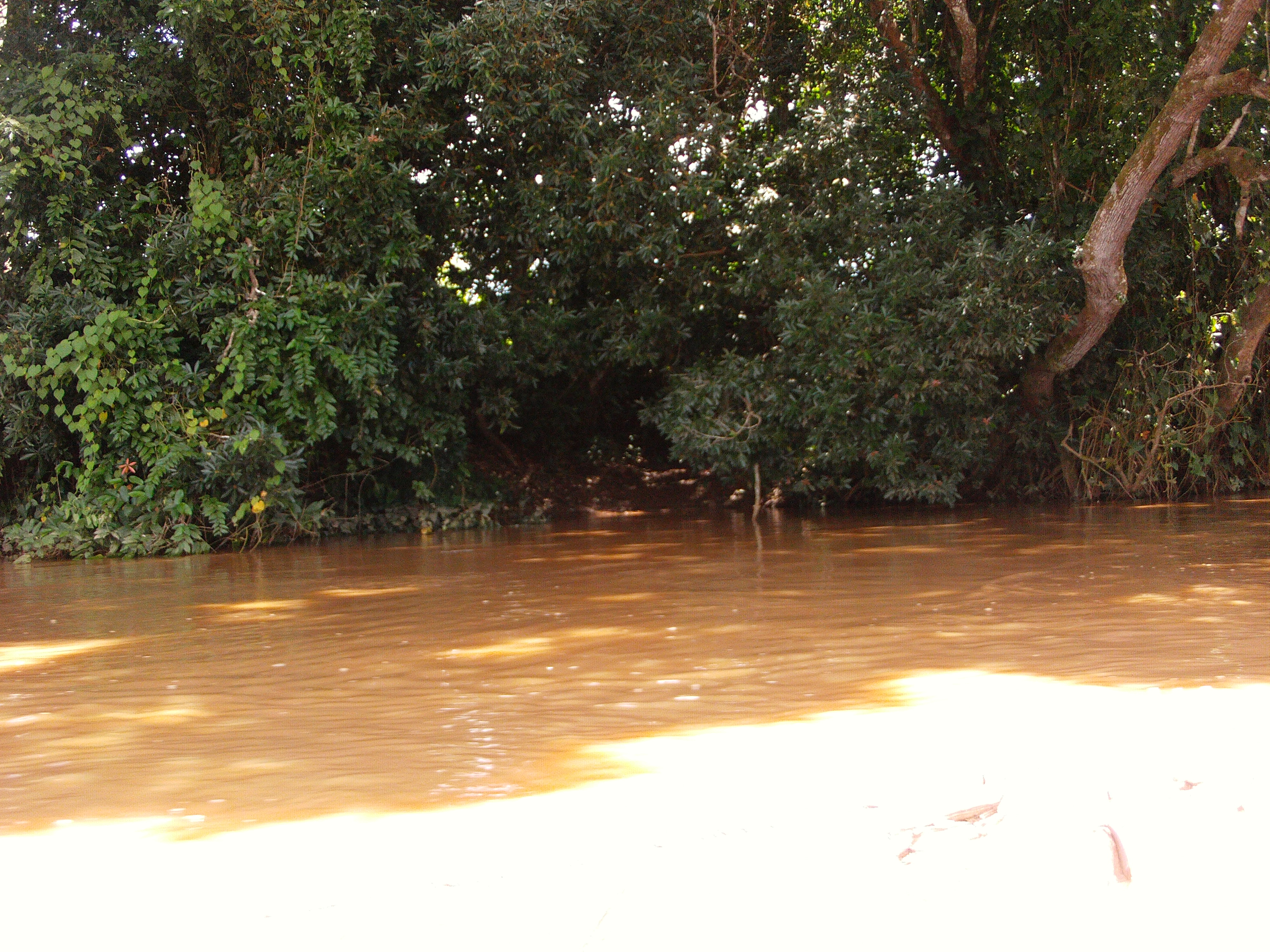
'Hippo Trail' on the Mbam river

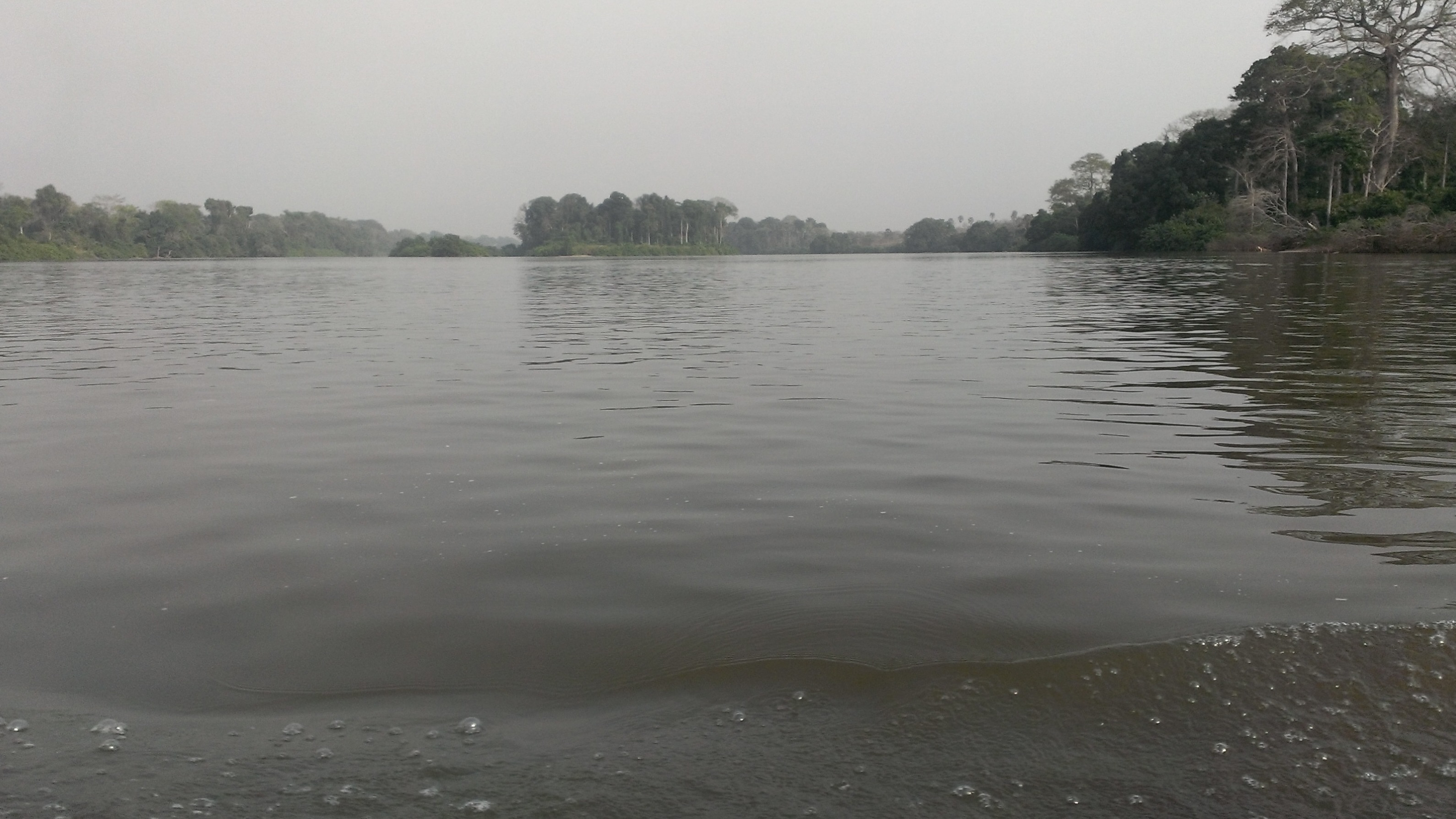
Mbam river seen from a pirogue
