= Bipindi =

Coordinates: 3°05′N 10°25′E

Bipindi Bipindé
- Commune and town
- Interactive map of Bipindi
- Country: Cameroon
- Time zone: UTC+1 (WAT)

Bipindi is a town and commune in Cameroon.

== Gallery ==
Market, Bipindi, 1997

Pupils from Bagyeli boarding school, following the principles of ORA (Observer, Réfléchir, Agir) of the Foyer Notre Dame de la Forêt (Bagyeli pygmies), Bipindi, 1997

The kitchen of the Notre Dame de la Forêt boarding school, Bipindi, 1997

The eating-house of Angele, a Bantu woman, Bipindi, 1997

The dining room of the Notre Dame de la Forêt boarding school, Bipindi, 1997

Bagyeli children by the window of their classroom. Notre Dame de la Forêt, Bipindi, 1997

== See also ==
- Communes of Cameroon
