= Yaoundé Hospital =

Yaoundé Hospital may refer to:

- Central Hospital of Yaoundé
- Yaoundé General Hospital
- Yaoundé Gynaecology, Obstetrics and Pediatrics Hospital
- University Teaching Hospital of Yaounde
