= South Cameroon Plateau =

Region of Cameroon

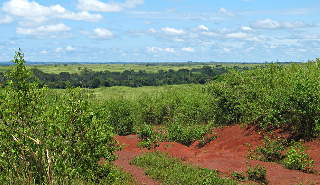
Guinean savanna in Cameroon's East Province

The South Cameroon Plateau or Southern Cameroon Plateau (French: Plateau Sud-Camerounais) is the dominant geographical feature of Cameroon. The plateau lies south of the Adamawa Plateau and southeast of the Cameroon Range. It slopes south and west until giving way to the Cameroon coastal plain in the southwest and the Congo River basin in the southeast. The plateau is characterised by hills and valleys in the southwest and a more gentle peneplain in the southwest. Isolated massifs occur, especially in the southwest. Metamorphic rocks make up the plain's basement. The soils are ferrallitic and lateritic, with colouration ranging from red or brown in the interior to yellow on the coast. The soils are subjected to silica leeching, so they are not productive without fertiliser.

The plateau experiences four major seasons, two rainy, and two dry. Rainfall is high, especially along the coast. The average temperature changes little from 25°C. Rivers in the region drain into the Atlantic Ocean and the Congo River basin. South of the Sanaga, those rivers flow steadily year-round, but the Sanaga and rivers north have a complex regime characterised by high- and low-water periods upstream and constant flow downstream. The predominant vegetation is rainforest, especially to the plateau's south. To the north, forests give way to savanna.

== Topography ==
The South Cameroon Plateau lies between 2 and 6° N and 10 and 16° E. It covers about 225,100 km², more than half of Cameroon's total area. The plateau is characterised by sloping terrain and gently rolling hills. The altitude varies from 250 to 800 m and averages 600 or 650 m. The Western High Plateau lies northwest of the plateau and separates it from the interior African plain. The Adamawa Plateau lies to the plateau's north. From an altitude between 800 and 900 m. there, the plateau slowly slopes south and west from the region of Bedzare and Meiganga.

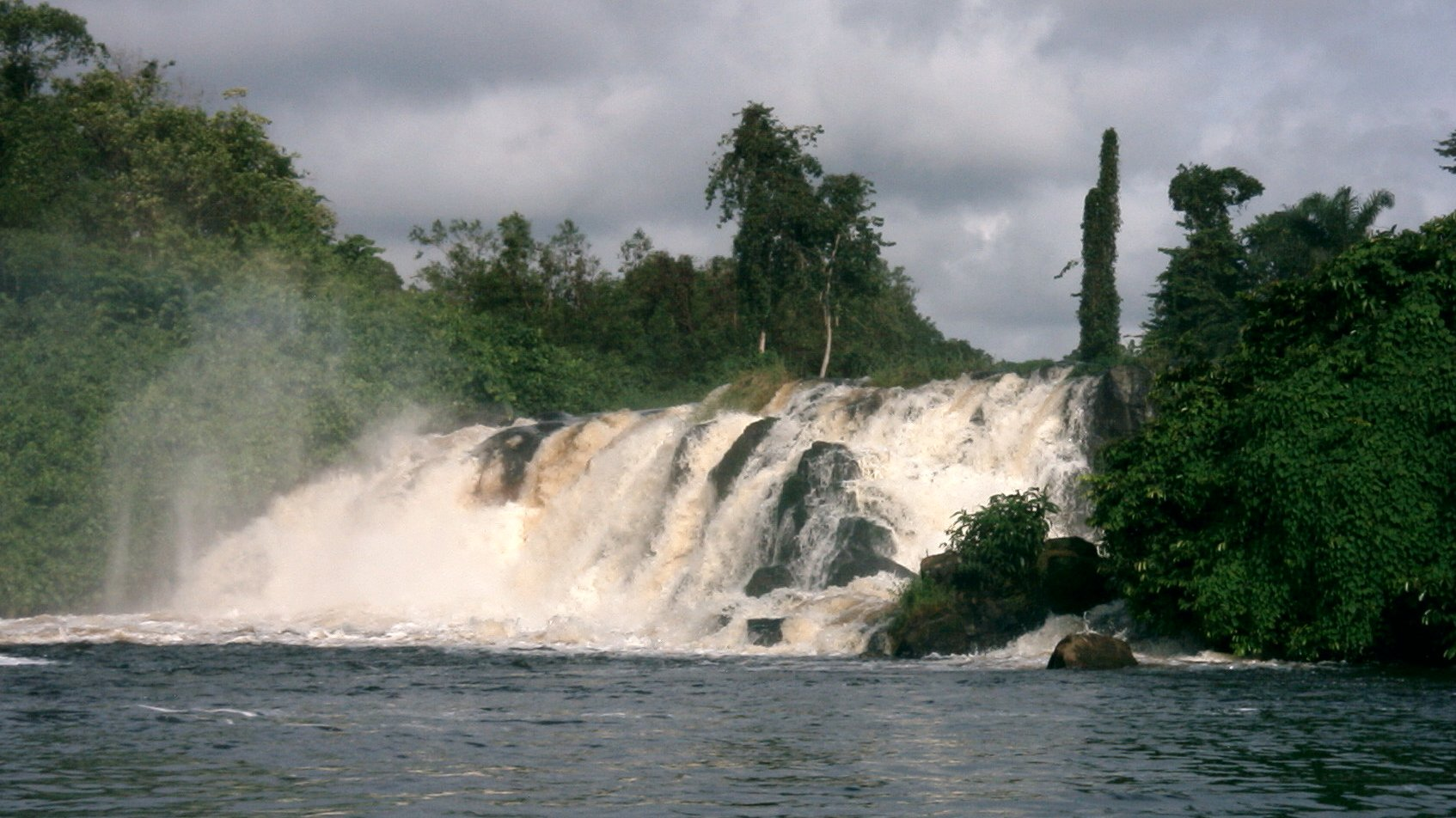
Lobé Falls

To the southwest, large inselbergs and tall hills separated by deep gullies predominate. The plateau gives way to the Cameroon coastal plain in escarpments. This topography has resulted in the creation of the Lobé Falls near Kribi, where the Lobé River meets the sea in a series of rapids. Some of the plateau's highest points are in this region, such as Mbam Minkom near Yaoundé (1,295 m), and Ntem massif near Ebolowa (1,400 m).

To the southeast, the transition to the Congo Basin takes place on a gently sloping peneplain. The hills of the eastern portion are gentler than those of the west. These hills are known as half-oranges and can easily be seen in the area of Batouri and Bélabo. The lowest point of the plateau is the Sangha River valley in the southeast.

== Geology ==
Metamorphic rocks such as gneiss, mica, migmatites, and schists make up the South Cameroon Plateau's basement. Deposits of these rocks appear along fault lines south of Yaoundé, where schists and quartzites are found; near the Dja River, where limestone and schists occur; and along the Ntem River, where gneiss, granite, mica, migmatite, and schists occur. The plateau's western portions are made up primarily of gneiss. These rocks are millions of years old.

The plateau's soils are predominantly ferrallitic and lateritic, the result of decomposing crystalline and sedimentary stone. The soil colour varies from red or reddish brown in the interior to yellow along the coast, where greater humidity causes a colour change. The soil is made up of decomposing crystalline rocks (granite, gneiss, schists, and michachists), or sedimentary rocks in the coastal area. Soils are deep, averaging 10 m., although they are thinner in the north, where rainy seasons are shorter. Ferrous deposits in the soil are quite hard and are used to make bricks. Constant leaching of silica by percolating water prevents the soils from being very productive without fertilisation.

== Climate ==
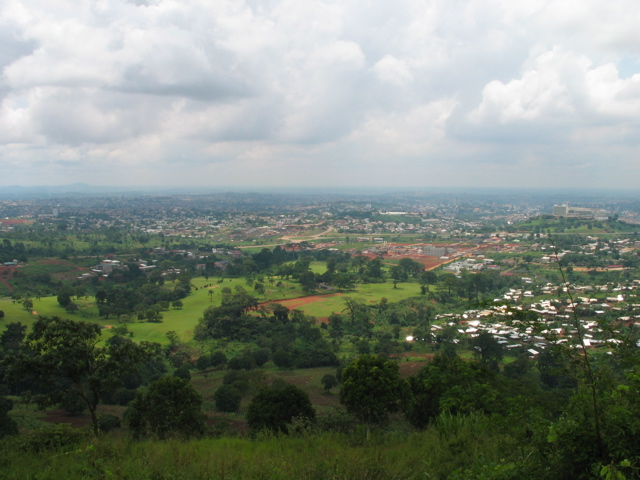
Yaoundé from Mount Febe

The South Cameroon Plateau experiences an equatorial climate of the Guinea subtype. The area experiences four seasons each year: two rainy, and two dry. The long dry season is from December to March (or slightly longer in the northern reaches of the plateau), the short rainy season from March to June, the short dry season in August, and the long rainy season from September to December.

Rainfall averages 1,500–2,000 mm per year, and precipitation is common even during the dry seasons. However, rainfall is higher near the coast and in the south and diminishes toward the northeast. The coastal city Kribi, for example, receives 2,970 mm of rain each year, Moloundou in the southeast gets 1,502 mm, and Yoko gets 1,638 mm.

The temperature remains fairly steady year round, averaging 25°C. This fluctuates slightly with the seasons. The long, rainy season is the coldest time of year, and the long dry season is the warmest. Humidity is high year round.

== Drainage ==
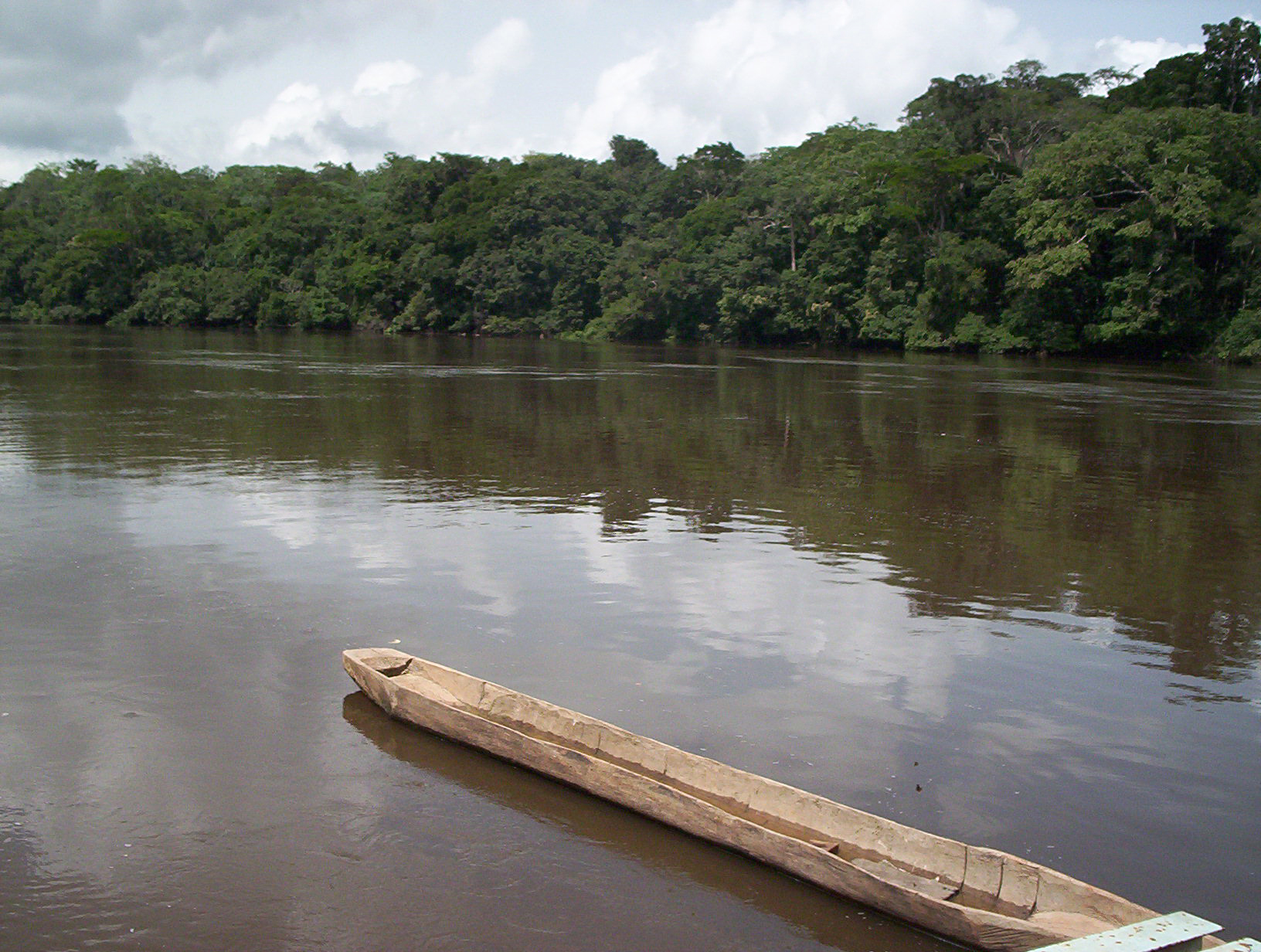
The Dja River

Numerous rivers run through the South Cameroon Plateau, particularly in the southeast. These bodies of water drain into both the Atlantic Ocean and the Congo River basin. The rivers south of the Sanaga follow an equatorial regime; that is, they reach a high water point during the rainy seasons and a low point during the dry seasons. There, rivers such as the Dja, Boumba, and Sangha have carved out valleys. The rivers flow slowly and experience seasonal flooding during the rainy season.

The Sanaga and rivers north of it follow a complex, or mixed, Sudano-Guinea regime because the territory they drain lies in both tropical and equatorial climate zones. This means that upstream, they follow a tropical regime, with high water during the long rainy season and low water during the long dry season. However, further south, they receive constant rainfall and flow steadily.

== Flora and fauna ==
Dense vegetation covers the plateau, especially in the south. This includes vast tracts of rainforest, which grows in three or four strata. The tallest trees are straight with buttress roots and stand about 40 m tall. Below these stand thinner, shorter trees with large concentrations of leaves at their tops. The bottom layer is made up of undergrowth of saplings and grasses, although this layer is thin when the larger trees grow close together and block the sunlight. Tree species include azobé, bubinga, ebony, iroko, mahogany, and obeche. This primary rainforest exists in the plateau's south and east. Where human activities have affected the forest, for farming, timber, pasture, and urban growth, secondary growth has taken over as the forest has recovered. This is evident around Yaoundé.

Forest gradually gives way to Guinean savanna to the north. This consists of vast grasslands punctuated by trees. The savanna has increased as human activities have cut back the forest through activities such as burning.

The plateau's rainforests house large numbers of animal species. These include birds, monkeys, and snakes. Others are elephants, chimpanzees, and many rodents.
