= Boumba Bek National Park =

National park in southeast Cameroon

- IUCN category II (national park)
- Location within Cameroon
- Location: Cameroon
- Nearest city: Salapoumbé
- Coordinates: 02°13′0″N 15°42′0″E
- Area: 2,382 km^{2} (920 sq mi)
- Established: 17 October 2005
- Governing body: World Wildlife Fund

Boumba Bek National Park is a national park in extreme southeastern Cameroon, located in its East Province.

== History ==
The park was never logged; according to the World Wildlife Fund's scientific advisor in the region, Paul Robinson Ngnegueu, "poaching is the biggest threat to Boumba Bek." This is a result of the late 1980s economic depression in Cameroon. The indigenous people followed the poachers, attracted by the financial opportunities. They would sell their product through "intermediaries" for money and more hunting supplies.

In 1995, the park was named an Essential Protection Zone, its first official status. It was not formally established as a national park, however, until the Cameroonian government decreed the creation of Boumba Bek and Nki National Parks on 17 October 2005. Its establishment is a result of a summit held by seven central African leaders in Brazzaville, Republic of Congo, in February 2005.

Cameroon and Gabon are currently working on the TRIDOM project, a conservation initiative leading to a land management plan which will oversee access to and use of forests. It will create a tri-national "interzone" bordered by the Minkebe, Boumba-Bek, Nki, and Odzala National Parks and the Dja Wildlife Reserve. This project is part of a conservation movement toward the zoning and designation of new protected areas.

== Geography and climate ==
Boumba Bek is located between the Boumba and Bek Rivers in southeast Cameroon, from which it derives its name. The site is accessible only by pirogue and several hunting trails. It is sandwiched between the towns of Yokadouma and Moloundou in the Boumba et Ngoko department in Cameroon's East Province. The park is situated from latitude 2˚09 to 2˚20 N and longitude 15˚35 to 15˚50 E.

Sixteen bais, or forest clearings, have been discovered in Boumba Bek National Park. Of these, four are currently being monitored for large mammalian activities.

The park has a tropical climate with temperature ranging from 23.1 to 25˚C with an average annual temperature of 24˚C. Its relative humidity varies between 60 and 90% while annual rainfall is 1500 mm per year. According to the Cameroon Ministry of Agriculture, Moloundou has a rainy season from September to November, a dry season from November to March, a rainy season from March to June, and a dry season from July to August.

== Demographics ==
The area around the park, as defined by the World Wildlife Fund, has a population of 33,169 people, mostly comprising ethnic Bantus and, despite being named a minority in Cameroon's constitution of 18 January 1996, Baka Pygmies. These include the Kounabembe, Bangando, Bakwele, Mbomam, Essel, Mbimo, and Mpong-Mpong tribes. Non-indigenous employees of logging companies and Muslim merchants from northern Cameroon make up a sizeable amount of the total population.

== Biodiversity ==
=== Flora ===
A majority of the park is semi-evergreen lowland rainforest, along with several patches of closed-canopy evergreen forest. Small areas of seasonally flooded forest, swamp-forest, and grassy savannas also exist within its boundaries.

=== Fauna ===
Boumba Bek, according to the Environmental News Service, "encompass[es] a biodiverse group of plants and animals". Chimpanzees, forest antelope, crocodiles and bongos are all found in Boumba Bek National Park. In addition, roughly 300 fish species, three of which are not named, swim in the park's rivers.

The forests of Cameroon contain some of the highest population density of African forest elephants of any nation, and Boumba Bek is no different, with an elephant density of roughly 2.5 for Boumba Bek and Nki combined.

Boumba Bek was designated an Important Bird Area by BirdLife International.
