= Salapoumbé =

Coordinates: 2.6163°N 15.3775°E

- Commune and town
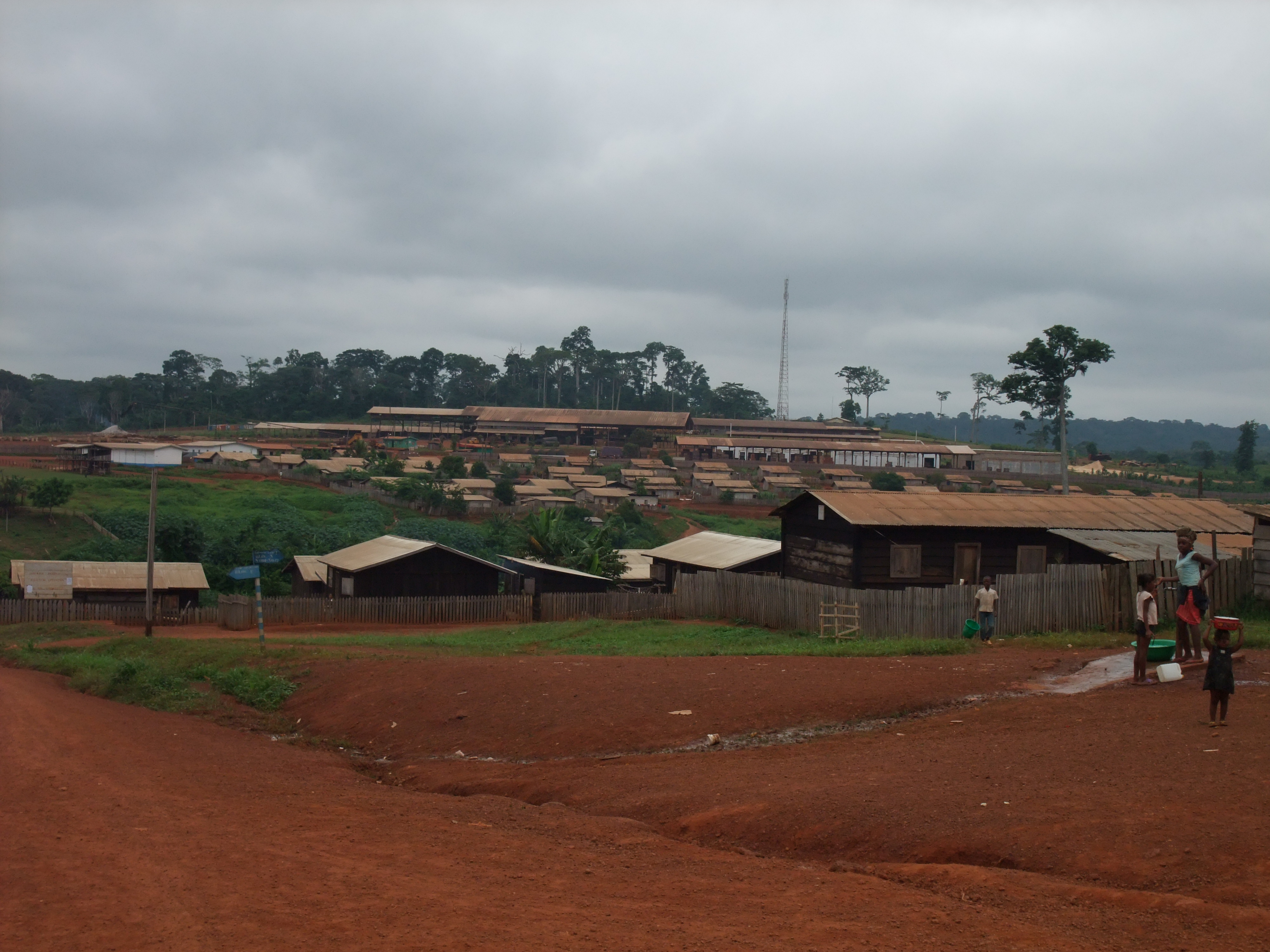
- the saw mill of Lokomo
- Interactive map of Salapoumbé
- Country: Cameroon
- Department: Boumba-et-Ngoko
- Region: East region

Area
  - Total: 3,600 sq mi (9,400 km^{2})

Population (2012)
  - Total: 18.335
- Time zone: UTC+1 (WAT)

Salapoumbé is a town and commune in Cameroon, Africa.

It is situated at about 150 km from Yokadouma, 468 km from Bertoua, and 788 km from the capital Yaoundé, bordering the Central African Republic and the Republic of the Congo to the east. Salapoumbé consists of 10 villages and 11 campements Bakas. The Bantu populations came in the 1950th from South Sudan following the forrest companies.

The Sangha river forms the frontier with the Central African Republic and the Republic of the Congo.

Next to the town of Salapoumbé the commune also covers the villages of :

- Bela
- Koumela
- Libongo
- Lokomo
- Mikel
- Momboué
- Ngolla 120
- Tembe-Piste

== National parks ==
- Lobéké National Park
- Boumba Bek National Park

== See also ==
- Communes of Cameroon
