= Ngoko =

Ngoko may refer to

- Ngoko River, stream in west-central Africa
- Ngoko, informal speech style of Javanese. See Javanese language § Registers
