= Moloundou =

Mouloundou
- Location in Cameroon
- Coordinates: 2°3′N 15°10′E
- Country: Cameroon
- Province: East
- Division: Boumba-et-Ngoko

Moloundou is a town and arrondissement (district) in the Boumba-et-Ngoko Division of southeastern Cameroon's East Province. Moloundou sits on the north bank of the Dja River, also known as the Ngoko River, which forms the Cameroon–Republic of Congo border here. It is close to Boumba Bek and Nki National Parks on the Dja River. It has a mayor and several decentralised administrative services.

== History ==
In the 1890s, Moloundou was "one of the richest rubber areas of Africa" and Germans established a rubber-making plant here.

Scientists have pointed to the area around Moloundou as the most likely place where the simian immunodeficiency virus (specifically, SIVcpz) crossed over from the blood of a central chimpanzee to humans — becoming HIV, the virus that causes AIDS. The genetic structure of SIV in the area's chimpanzees is the closest known to HIV-1 group M, the subtype of HIV responsible for more than 90% of HIV/AIDS cases worldwide.

"There is now no doubt that the original cross-species transmission occurred somewhere in this area, close to the town of Moloundou on the Cameroonian side, or perhaps near Ouesso in Congo-Brazzaville about 90 km to the east," wrote scientist Jacques Pépin in The Origins of AIDS. "This is where our story began and where patient zero got infected, whoever he or she was."

== Geography and climate ==
Mouloundou is situated roughly 280 km from the Cameroonian Republic of Congo border town of Yokadouma. It is close to Boumba Bek and Nki National Parks on the Dja River. The town has a tropical climate with temperature ranging from 23.1–25 °C (73.6–77.0 °F) with an average annual temperature of 24 °C (75 °F). Its relative humidity varies between 60 and 90% while annual rainfall is 1,500 mm (59 in) per year. According to the Cameroon Ministry of Agriculture, Moloundou has a rainy season from September to November, a dry season from November to March, a rainy season from March to June, and a dry season from July to August.

== Demographics ==
The area around Mouloundou, as defined by the World Wildlife Fund, has a population of 22,882 people, mostly ethnic Bantus and, despite being named a minority in Cameroon's constitution of 18 January 1996, Baka Pygmies. These include the Djem, Bangando, Bakwele and Zime tribes. Non-indigenous employees of logging companies and traders make up a sizeable amount of the population. The population density of the region is about five people per km^{2}, concentrated along the main Yokadouma-Moloundou road. The villages near Mouloundou are mostly homogeneous as there are few non-natives, mostly working as civil servants or traders.
