= Nki National Park =

Natural park in Cameroon

- IUCN category II (national park)
- Location within Cameroon
- Location: Cameroon
- Coordinates: 2°25′0″N 14°25′0″E
- Area: 3,093 km^{2} (1,194 sq mi)
- Established: 17 October 2005
- Governing body: World Wildlife Fund

Nki National Park (Parc national de Nki, also Réserve de Nki) is a national park in southeastern Cameroon, located in its East Province. The closest towns to Nki are Yokadouma, Moloundou and Lomie, beyond which are rural lands. Due to its remoteness, Nki has been described as "the last true wilderness". It has a large and varied ecosystem, and it is home to over 265 species of birds, and the forests of Cameroon contain some of the highest population density of forest elephants of any nation with an elephant density of roughly 2.5 per square kilometer for Nki and neighboring Boumba Bek National Park combined. These animals are victims of poaching, which has been a major problem since an economic depression in the 1980s. The indigenous people follow in the footsteps of the poachers, attracted by the financial opportunities. The removal of logging industries from the park, on the other hand, has been a success; it is no longer considered a major threat to Nki's wilderness.

== History ==
The World Wildlife Fund has been in the process of conserving the park since the 1980s, including ridding the area of the logging business. This movement, however, has been met with some criticism, especially by members of the remote village of Ndongo, Cameroon. Before WWF arrived, Ndongo was a bustling logging town of 300 residents with fairly good roads and plentiful working opportunities. Once the organization established itself, it pressured the logging companies to operate in a more environmentally friendly manner. The logging companies pulled out of the town in 1988, leaving broken machinery and severely damaging Ndongo's economy. According to Leonard Usongo, manager of WWF projects in southeast Cameroon, "we cannot convince a community of the need to protect forests if we don’t acknowledge their problems or their poverty."

Today, logging is no longer a major problem, as "it would require a lot of investment to develop necessary infrastructure, such as roads, for [its] operations, especially in the southern portion of Nki." According to the WWF's scientific advisor in the region, Paul Robinson Ngnegueu, "poaching is the biggest threat to ... Nki." It is a result of the late 1980s economic depression in Cameroon. The indigenous people followed the poachers, attracted by the financial opportunities. They would sell their product through "intermediaries" for money and more hunting supplies.

Cameroonian authorities fought poaching in Nki by applying repressive measures to the indigenous population. An example of this was in January 1997, when Bakas were forced from their homes near Mambele. These actions turned the Bakas against the WWF, which they considered "an organization of whites who want to protect animals". Every year, poachers travel up the Dja for central Nki, where elephant ivory is abundant. Strong currents on the river are a deterrent for half the year, but after that, according to freelance journalist Jemini Pandya, the fauna is easy to prey upon.

Nonetheless, when Pandya of the WWF visited Nki National Park in the early 1990s, she described it as "the last true wilderness". In 1995, the park was named an Essential Protection Zone, its first official status. It was not formally established as a national park until the Cameroonian government decreed the creation of Boumba Bek and Nki National Parks on 17 October 2005. This establishment was not without opposition; the Bakas have continually asked to reduce the park's boundaries and ask for higher usage rights, which invaded upon "their" land.

Cameroon and Gabon are currently working on the TRIDOM project, a conservation initiative leading to a land management plan which will oversee access to and use of forests. It will create a tri-national "interzone" bordered by the Minkebe, Boumba-Bek, Nki, and Odzala National Parks and the Dja Wildlife Reserve. This project is part of a conservation movement toward the zoning and designation of new protected areas.

== Geography and climate ==
The park is located in a remote area of southeastern Cameroon, which "has helped maintain most of its pristine forest and beauty". It has never been completely explored. Largely hilly in its terrain at an elevation of 350–650 m, it falls within the Sangha ecoregion. Nki is crossed by several large rivers, including the Dja River. A waterfall, Nki falls, is located on the river in the park, giving "a tinge of exoticism to the landscape". The park is situated from latitude 2˚05 to 2˚50 N and longitude 14˚05 to 14˚50 E. It covers a surface area of 3,093 km^{2} (1,194 sq mi) and straddles two administrative divisions in the East province: Ngoyla in Haut Nyon and Moloundou in Boumba et Ngoko Division. The closest towns to Nki are Yokadouma, Moloundou and Lomie, beyond which is rural lands.

Seventy-three bais, or forest clearings, have been discovered in Nki National Park. In April 2006, while looking for elephant groups, a WWF team discovered the largest bai in the region, Ikwa Bai. Dr. Mike Loomis, a member of the group, confirmed that this bai is slightly larger than Dzanga Sangha Bai (Central African Republic), which had previously held the record. He also reported little human development adjacent to the bai, and noticed 21 elephants and 16 buffaloes in it simultaneously. The bai has a small creek running through its center, which sits atop a bed of rocks and sand. A large mineral pit is located next to the stream. It is the habitat of several wildlife species, the largest-numbering being chimpanzees, elephants, buffaloes, and gorillas.

The park has a tropical climate with temperature ranging from 23.1–25˚C with an average annual temperature of 24˚C. Its relative humidity varies between 60 and 90% while annual rainfall is 1500 mm per year. According to the Cameroon Ministry of Agriculture, nearby Moloundou has a rainy season from September to November, a dry season from November to March, a rainy season from March to June, and a dry season from July to August.

== Demographics ==
The area around the park, as defined by the World Wildlife Fund, has a human population of 22,882, mostly ethnic Bantus and, despite being named a minority in Cameroon's constitution of 18 January 1996, Baka Pygmies. These include the Djem, Bangando, Bakwele and Zime tribes. Non-indigenous employees of logging companies and traders make up a sizeable amount of the population. The population density of the region is about five people per square kilometer, concentrated along the main Yokadouma-Moloundou road. The villages around the park are mostly homogeneous as there are few non-natives, most of whom work as civil servants or traders.

== Biodiversity ==
=== Flora ===
As with Boumba-Bek to the northeast, the main type of forest is semi-evergreen with an open canopy dominated by the 50–60 m Triplochiton, though it is mixed with large patches of closed evergreens. There are also some seasonally flooded Uapaca trees along the Dja River.

=== Fauna ===
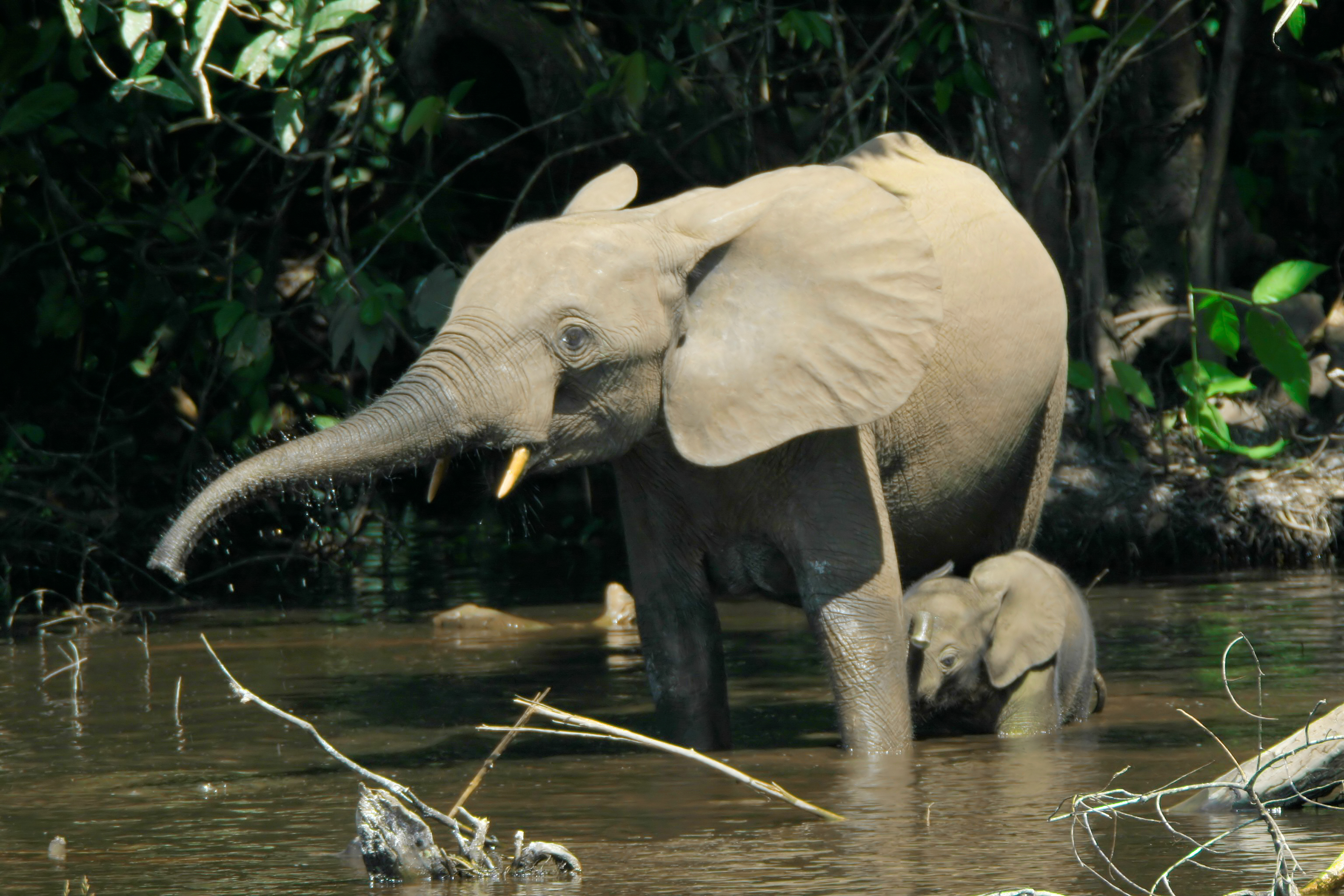
Nki National Park hosts about 3,000 African forest elephants as of 2006.

Nki, according to the Environmental News Service, "encompass[es] a biodiverse group of plants and animals". This has been confirmed by various studies over the years. Sitatunga, chimpanzees, forest antelope (largely duikers), bushbucks, giant forest hogs, bush pigs, leopard, Nile crocodiles and bongos are all found in Nki National Park, along with "hundreds" of fish species.

The forests of Cameroon contain some of the highest population density of forest elephants of any nation, and Nki is no different, with an elephant density of roughly 2.5 per square kilometer for Boumba Bek and Nki combined. The population has been steadily rising, from 1,547 in 1998 to 3,000 in 2006. Gorillas are also reported to abundant; there are an estimated 6,000 adults in Nki. The park is also home to diurnal primates, such as the threatened crested monkey, De Brazza monkey, and the black colobus, who reportedly only live east of the Dja River.

A 20-day study held by BirdLife International discovered 265 species of birds in the park. Of these, the yellow-bellied form of forest robin is widespread. In the study, a pair of Dja River scrub warblers was discovered in a 1 hectare patch of Rhynchospora marsh; its population must be small as there are few such marshes in Nki. Three species of forest nightjar have been observed in the park; Bate's and brown nightjars are common in southeastern Cameroon, while a rarer and unidentified third species' call has been heard twice. It is likely that this is Prigogine's nightjar, as its voice is identical to that of the only known specimen of this species which was found in the Democratic Republic of Congo. Two small owls, Sjostedt's and African barred owlets coexist in Nki, due to similar habitat requirements.

== See also ==
- List of national parks of Cameroon
