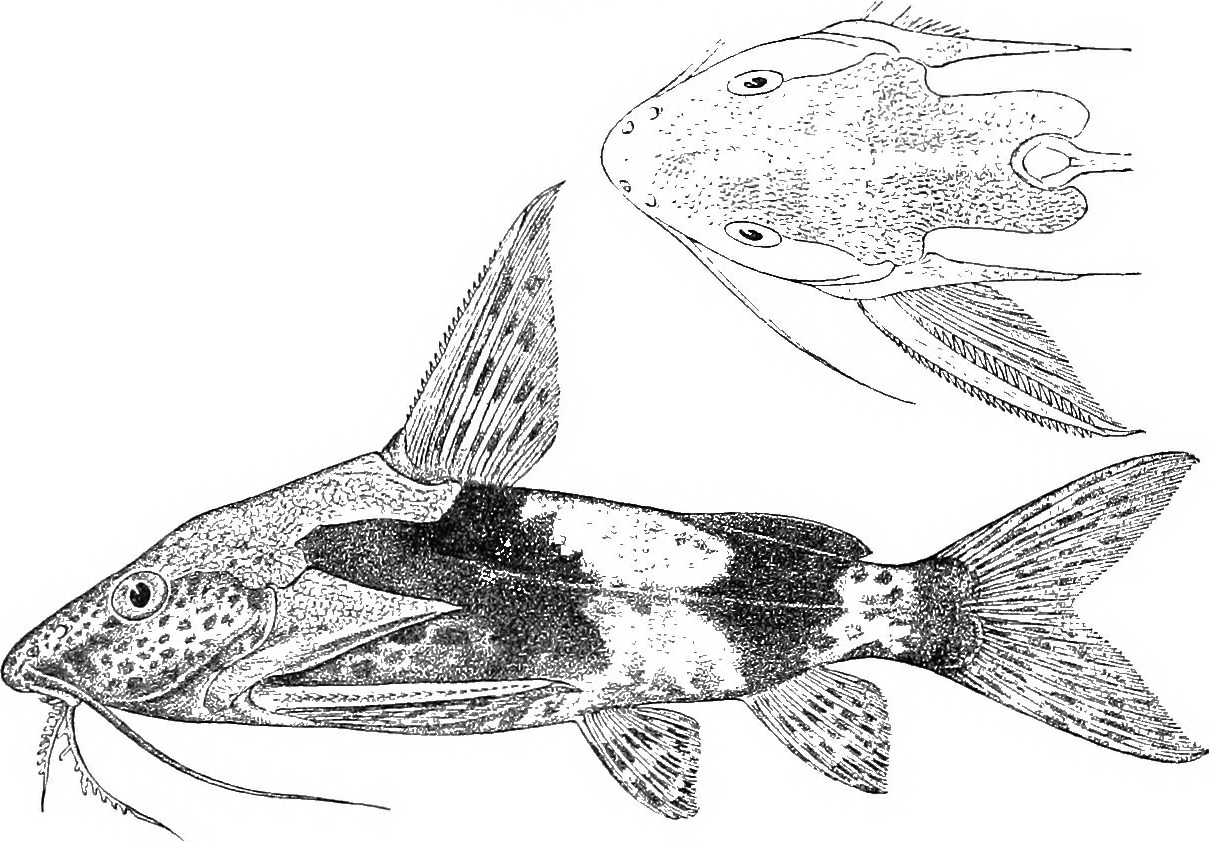

Conservation status
- Least Concern (IUCN 3.1)

Scientific classification
- Domain: Eukaryota
- Kingdom: Animalia
- Phylum: Chordata
- Class: Actinopterygii
- Order: Siluriformes
- Family: Mochokidae
- Genus: Synodontis
- Species: S. batesii

Binomial name
- Synodontis batesii Boulenger, 1907

= Synodontis batesii =

Species of fish

Synodontis batesii is a species of upside-down catfish native to rivers of Cameroon, the Democratic Republic of the Congo, Equatorial Guinea and Gabon. It was first collected by G. L. Bates and described by Belgian-British zoologist George Albert Boulenger in 1907, based upon holotypes discovered in the Dja River, near Bitye in Cameroon. The specific name "batesii" refers to the name of the collector of the first specimen.

== Description ==
The body of the fish is brown, blotched and marbled with darker browns. It has three broad, dark vertical bands on the sides. The fins are pale brown, or whitish, with black spots.

Like other members of the genus, this fish has a humeral process, which is a bony spike that is attached to a hardened head cap on the fish and can be seen extending beyond the gill opening. The first ray of the dorsal fin and the pectoral fins have a hardened first ray which is serrated. The caudal fin is deeply forked. It has short, cone-shaped teeth in the upper jaw. In the lower jaw, the teeth are s-shaped and movable. The fish has one pair of long maxillary barbels, extending to about the middle of the pectoral spine, and two pairs of mandibular barbels that are often branched. The small adipose fin is small.

This species grows to a length of 11.5 centimetres (4.5 in) SL although specimens up to 12.6 centimetres (5.0 in) TL have been recorded in the wild.

== Habitat ==
In the wild, the species inhabits tropical waters with a temperature range of 23 to 26 °C (73 to 79 °F), and a pH of 6.5 – 7.0. It is found in the Dja River basin and the central Congo River basin. It has been seen in the Nyong River and the Ntem River of Cameroon, the Ivindo River, and the Ogooué River of Gabon, and the Río Muni of Equatorial Guinea.
