= East Region (Cameroon) =

Region of Cameroon

East Region Région de l'Est
- Region of Cameroon
- Location of East Region within Cameroon
- Coordinates: 4°00′N 14°00′E
- Country: Cameroon
- Capital: Bertoua
- Departments: Boumba-et-Ngoko, Haut-Nyong, Kadey, Lom-et-Djérem

Government
  - Governor: Gregoire Mvongo

Area
  - Total: 109,002 km^{2} (42,086 sq mi)

Population (2015)
  - Total: 835,642
  - Density: 7.66630/km^{2} (19.8556/sq mi)
- Time zone: UTC+01:00 (WAT)
- HDI (2022): 0.543 low · 7th of 10

The East Region (French: Région de l'Est) occupies the southeastern portion of the Republic of Cameroon. It is bordered to the east by the Central African Republic, to the south by Congo, to the north by the Adamawa Region, and to the west by the Centre and South Regions. With 109,002 km^{2} of territory, it is the largest region in the nation as well as the most sparsely populated. Historically, the peoples of the East have been settled in Cameroonian territory for longer than any other of the country's many ethnic groups, the first inhabitants being the Baka (or Babinga) pygmies.

The East Region has very little industry, its main commerce consisting of logging, timber, and mining. Instead, the bulk of its inhabitants are subsistence farmers. The region is thus of little political import and is often ignored by Cameroonian politicians. This coupled with the low level of development in the province have led to its being dubbed "the forgotten province".

The southwest region is the most endowed with natural resources like oil, timber and plantain plantation

== Geography ==
=== Land ===
The soil of the East is predominantly ferrallitic, rich with iron and red in colour. The southern three quarters of the region consists of metamorphic rock such as gneiss, schist, mica, and migmatite. Starting at about the level of Bertoua and going north, however, granite becomes the dominant soil component. While the region supports an abundance of plant life, it is not particularly fertile due to leaching caused by the humid environment. Eastern dirt hardens quickly in the sun, and it is often used as a building material by poorer inhabitants.

=== Drainage ===
The region contains several river systems: the Nyong, which drains the central-western area, the Dja in the southwest, the Lom in the northeast, the Kadéï, which drains the northwest, the Boumba in the centre and southeast, and the Sangha and Ngoko, which drain portions of the southeast and form the border with the Central African Republic and Congo respectively. Many of these rivers have carved out valleys that surround them. The rivers of the territory have only slight gradients, and floods can occur along them during the rainy season. The Lom and Nyong rivers eventually empty into the Atlantic Ocean. All other rivers in the East form part of the Congo River basin.

=== Relief ===
Almost the entire territory of the East Region lies on the South Cameroon Plateau that forms the southeastern half of the country. The elevation thus varies between 500 and 1000 metres above sea level except for lower-lying plains of 200 to 500 metres in the extreme southeast centered on the Dja, Boumba, Sangha, and Ngoko Rivers. The land consists largely of monotonous, gently undulating hills known as "half-oranges" due to their resemblance to that fruit.

=== Climate ===
The East has a Type A wet equatorial climate (also known as a Guinea type climate), meaning that it experiences high temperatures (24˚ C on average) and a lack of traditional seasons. Instead, there is a long dry season from December to May, a light wet season from May to June, a short dry season from July to October, and a heavy wet season from October to November. Humidity and cloud cover are relatively high, and precipitation averages 1500–2000 mm per year except in the extreme eastern and northern portions, where it is slightly less.

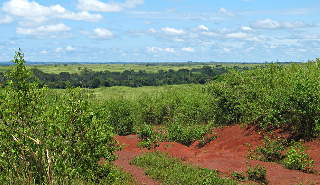
Guinean savanna near Bertoua

=== Plant and animal life ===
Approximately the lower two thirds of the region is covered in rain forest, which grows progressively thicker as one travels south. The forests are composed of hardwood evergreens of species such as dibetu, ebony, iroko, mahogany, obeche, and sapelli, some of which grow to heights of 70 metres or more. There are also numerous ferns and orchids. This forest is stratified into several levels. The first is composed of straight, thick-rooted trees averaging about 40-metres tall. After this grow shorter, thinner trees with highly placed clusters of leaves. Sparse grasses and other plants make up the ground layer. In areas closer to settlements and roads, human groups have harvested the larger trees, thus exposing the forest floor to more direct sunlight and allowing thick vegetation to thrive. The upper third of the province (beginning at about the latitude of Bertoua and Batouri) is dominated by humid, wooded savanna. Trees here are sparser, but still may grow to be as tall as 20 metres.

The government of Cameroon has established four forest and game reserves in the East: the Dja Reserve (Réserve du Biosphère de Dja) in the southwest of the province and extending into the South Province, Lobéké Park (Parc National de la Lobéké), the Boumba-Bek Reserve (Réserve de Boumba-Bek) and the Nki Reserve (Réserve de Nki) in the southeast. The Pangar Djérem Reserve (Réserve Pangar Djerem) protects one of the more heavily wooded parts of the Guinean savanna in the region's northwest and extends into the Adamawa Region.

Animal life is abundant and diverse. The forests are inhabited by numerous species of monkey, as well as some of the last populations of gorillas and chimpanzees in Cameroon. Bats and birds of various species are also common, as are various rodents. A few forest elephants still live in the region, as well. Many of these animals are currently under threat of extinction due to deforestation and the bushmeat trade.

== Demographics ==
Historical population
Year	Pop.	±% p.a.
1976	366,235	—
1987	517,198	+3.19%
2005	771,755	+2.25%
2015	835,642	+0.80%

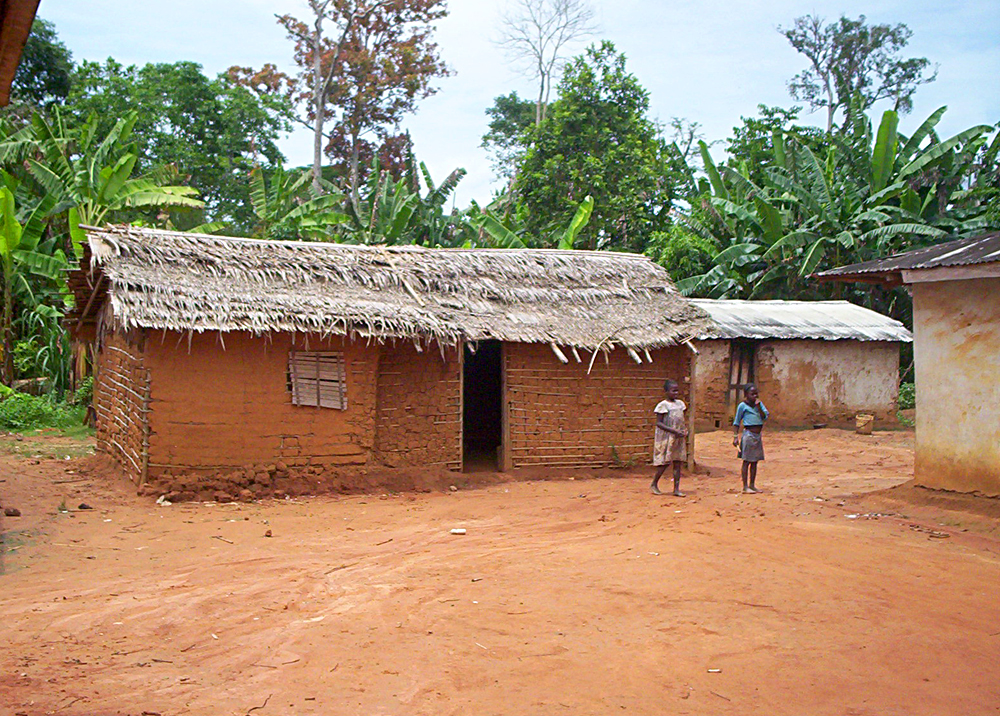
Typical Bantu house in the village of Ngoila

=== Settlement patterns ===
The East had 517,198 inhabitants in 1987, and it remains the most sparsely populated of Cameroon's ten regions. The bulk of the territory has a population density of less than five persons/km^{2}. This is mostly a result of the area's thick forests, which inhibit settlement and support disease-carrying insects such as mosquitoes and blackflies. These factors also make the East an unattractive target for development by both non-governmental organisations and the Cameroonian government, a fact that has only further prevented larger numbers of people from settling in the region.

The majority of the population is thus primarily situated in villages and towns along the few major roads that traverse the region. Along these routes, population density jumps to as high as 20/km^{2} and to 20-60/km^{2} on the Bertoua-Batouri corridor. The traditional Bantu dwelling is a rectangular house made of sun-dried bricks placed in a wooden frame. Raffia palm fronds are a common covering, though metal roofing has become more common.

=== People ===
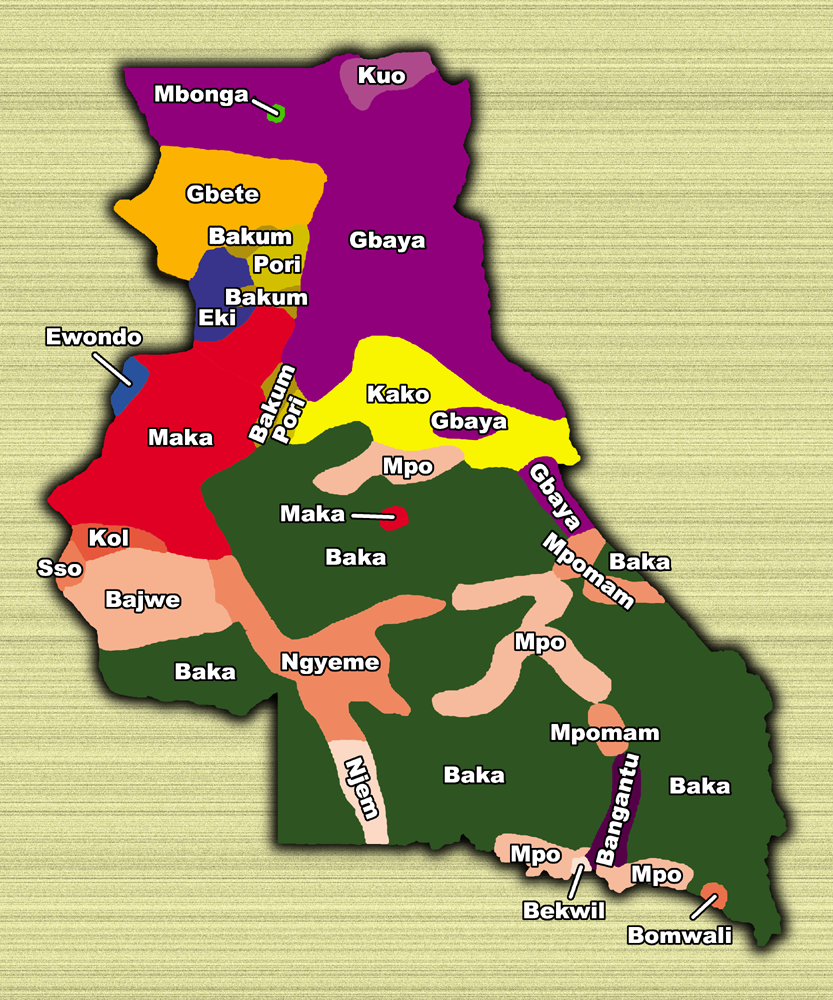
Ethnic groups of the East Province

The majority of the inhabitants of the East are members of Fulani (Fulbe) and various Bantu tribes that are collectively known as the Beti-Pahuin (Béti-Pahouin), the Fang-Beti, or simply the Fang. All of these groups speak various dialects of the Beti language. Most East Region peoples are considered Bantu in origin. The second most numerous are the various Adamawa–Ubangi tribes that inhabit much of the northern portions of the territory. Finally, the pygmies comprise another significant population.

Most eastern peoples speak their own distinctive languages, though educated individuals usually also know French. Minor languages spoken include Bomwali, Bulu, Kol, Mbonga, and Vute.

The people of the East are predominantly muslims, and Animist beliefs are also followed by much of the population, often in conjunction with Christianity. The East also has a significant percentage of Christian, particularly in the areas closer to the Center Province.

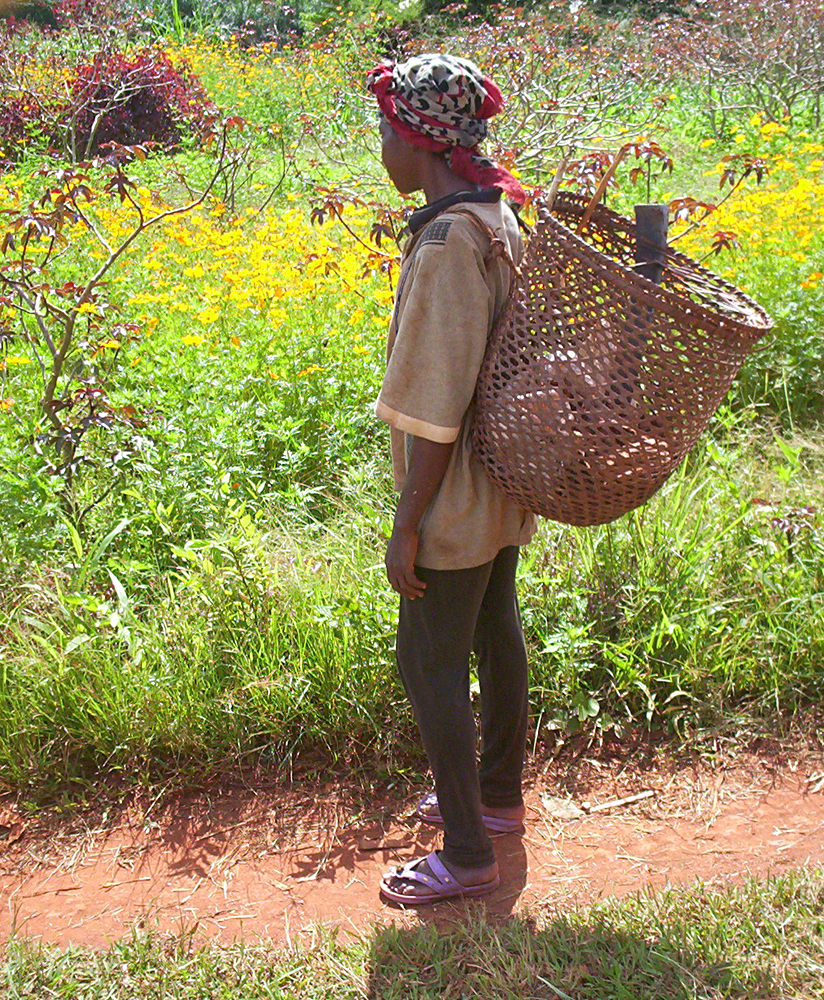
Maka woman on the way to her fields near Abong-Mbang

==== Bantu ====
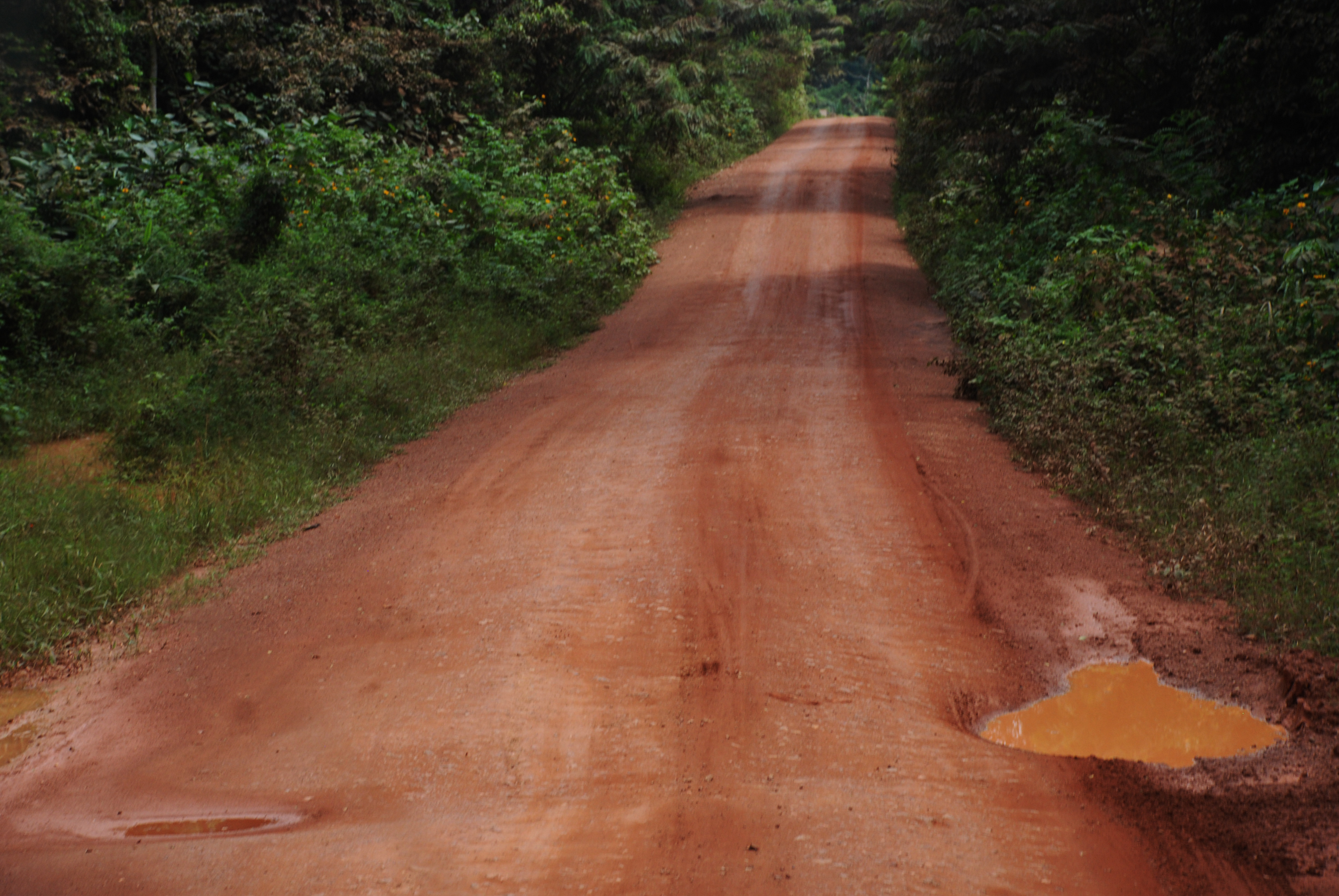
Yokadouma Road

The speakers of Makaa–Njem languages are the largest group of Bantu peoples in the region. The Maka form the majority of this group and occupy much of the western territories on the border with the Centre Region, including the towns of Abong-Mbang, Nguelemendouka, and Doumé. The Bajwe inhabit the territory immediately south of this, centred at Messaména. The Nzime live at Mindourou and its surroundings on the road that runs south from Abong-Mbang. Further south on this road are the Njem, whose territory includes the settlements of Lomié, Zoulabot, Zwadiba, and Ngoila. The Mpo occupy most of the territory surrounding the Ndélélé-Yokadouma road and the side-roads off of it, as well as much of the border with the Congo. The Mpoman have a small enclave at Lokomo south of Yokadouma, and the Kunbabeeg live west of this Mpo-Mpoman territory. All of these groups speak distinct, but closely related, languages.

Though the capital, Bertoua, is a traditional Gbaya settlement, the region is today a melange of several tribes, including the Baki, Pori, Bajem, and Kwa. The southwestern portion of the Lom and Djerem division, just west of this, is peopled by the Eki, who have more extensive territories in the Centre Region. Small areas on the road from Doumé to Gonga belong to the Kwakum and Pori. The Kaka live to the south and the west of the Kadey River and have high centres at Batouri and Ndélélé. The Bageto have lands south of Ndélélé.

==== Adamawa–Ubangi ====
The Gbaya are the most populous Ubangi group in the East, and they inhabit most of the Lom and Djerem division (including Bertoua) and the northernmost third of the Kadey division along the Kadey River. They also have smaller population centres, including the village of Gari-Gombo and Djampiel. The Kuo occupy the extreme northeastern corner of the region, including Wendoka. The Gbete (Kepere) live northwest of Bertoua, including the territory from Bélabo west to Yangamo. The Bangantu people live east of the Yokadouma-Moloundou road in the region's southeastern corner.

==== Baka pygmies ====
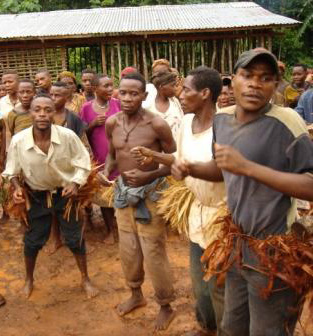
Baka dancers

The rest of the region, that which is covered by thick forests and not serviced by roads, is inhabited by the Baka, Babaya, or Babinga pygmies. Though traditionally hunter-gatherers, in recent times, the Baka have established trade with their Bantu neighbours, exchanging wild game for crops or metal tools. This relationship is not always equal, however, and Bantu sometimes take advantage of the Baka, exploiting them for labour or ceding their territory to logging companies without compensation.

The Cameroonian government has tried to encourage the Baka to establish permanent settlements, and some pygmy villages exist in the territory. Most of the Baka remain nomadic, however, living in temporary shelters of leaves and sticks. A much greater force acting to end the Baka's traditional lifestyle is intermarriage and assimilation into neighbouring tribes.

== Economy ==
=== Agriculture ===
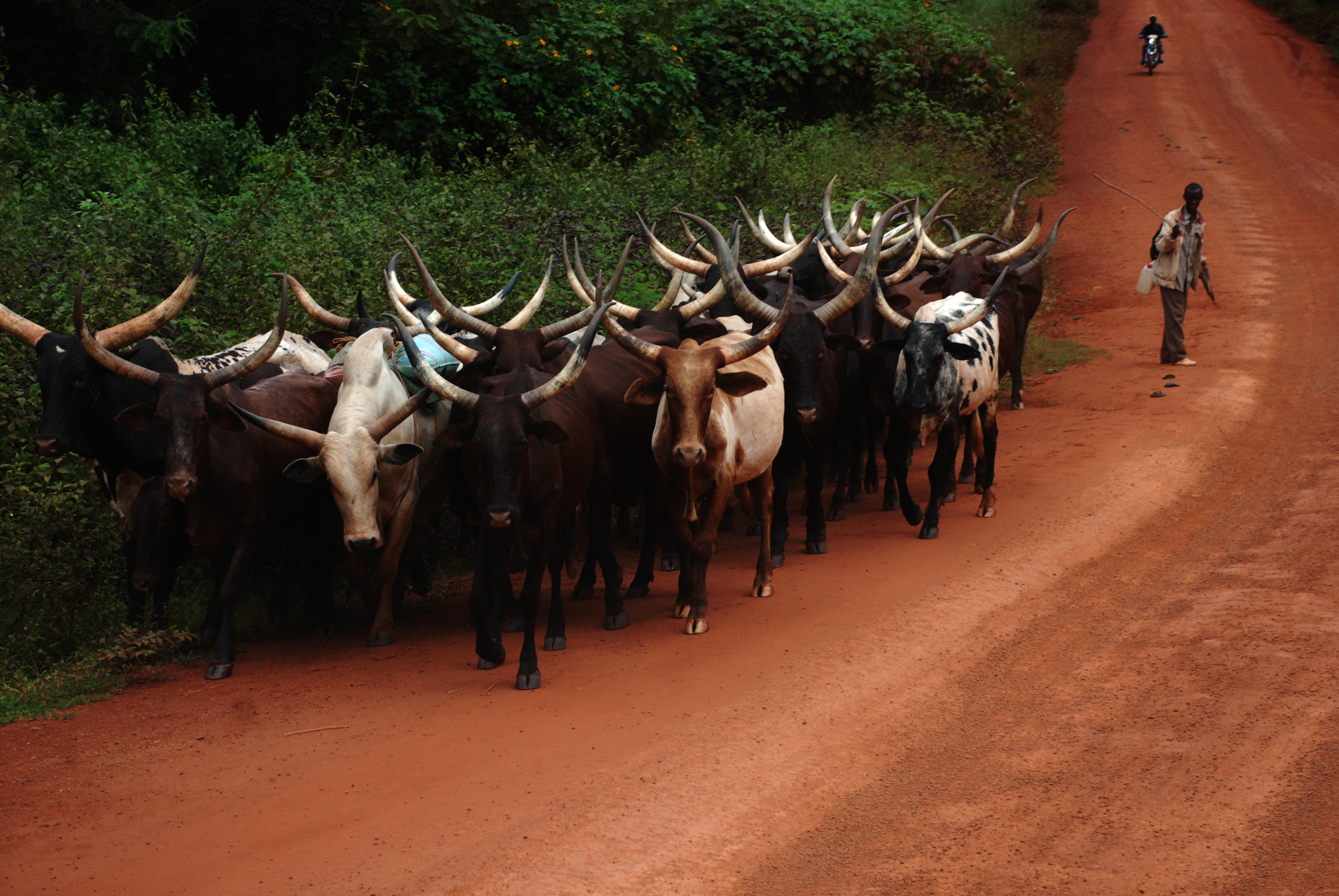
Caravane of cattle in Yokakouma, East Cameroon

The vast majority of the inhabitants of the region are subsistence farmers. Major crops are plantains south of Bertoua and Batouri and maize north of there. Farmers also raise many other crops in smaller quantities, including bananas, groundnuts, cocoyams, manioc, pineapples, oranges, mangoes, and yams. The dense forest and presence of the tsetse fly prohibits much cattle raising, but various livestock are raised for subsistence purposes, including pigs, sheep, goats, ducks, and chickens, as well as horses and donkeys in the extreme northeast. The Livestock Development Exploitation Organisation also runs a modern cattle ranch at Ndokayo in the province's northeast.

Farms are mostly small-scale affairs planted in clearings in the forest. Farmers clear an area during the dry season using traditional implements such as axes and machetes. The area is then burned, with care taken to preserve fruit trees such as mangoes or plums. At the start of the wet season, spices and common vegetables are planted close to the home and tubers, such as cocoyams and manioc, are placed with plantains in larger plots farther afield. Farmyard manure is used as fertiliser. Crops are then harvested at the beginning of the next dry season.

This method of slash-and-burn agriculture allows for high yields in the short term, but quickly exhausts the soil. Farms are thus moved every two to three years, and land must remain fallow for up to ten years once it has been drained in this way. With the East's low population density, however, this generally presents little problem.

Commercial crops also exist. Cocoa and coffee are raised for profit in the areas of Abong-Mbang, Bertoua, and Yokadouma, as well as in the heavy forests south of these areas. Tobacco is grown in the plains north of Batouri. No large-scale commercial livestock exists in the East, though cattle from the northern regions of Cameroon are herded through the province on their way to market in Yaoundé.

==== Hunting and gathering ====
Crop growing is often supplemented by hunting and gathering, particularly in more rural areas. In fact, among the province's pygmies, these activities are carried out almost exclusively. While gathering of various wild plant species is primarily a female occupation, hunting is conducted by men with traditional implements such as bows and arrows, spears, blowguns, and traps. In addition, firearms are becoming much more common in modern times. Though most hunting is done on a small scale, larger-scale techniques are sometimes employed. In these bigger hunts, people set fire to areas of forest or grassland in order to flush out prey. Other hunters or dogs frighten the animals into running toward armed men who then kill them.

=== Industry ===
The major industry of the East is forestry. The region has vast tracts of forest, and African and European companies have exploited these heavily. Because of the rapid rate of exploitation, however, lumber companies have been forced to push further and further into Central Africa to find suitable trees. As a result, much of the logging that once took place in Cameroon has been relocated to neighbouring countries such as Congo and the Central African Republic. The massive logging vehicles still travel through the East on their way to Cameroon's ports, and it is possible that without the logging industry, the East might never have got the little transportation network that exists there now. The East is also the home of several timber processing centres with major operations located around Bélabo, Dimako, and Mindourou.

In recent years, speculators have found deposits of gold near Bataré-Oya, cobalt near Lomié, and iron and aluminium in other areas. Companies have since moved in to exploit these resources as well. Other industries have a much smaller presence, such as a groundnut-oil mill located in Bertoua.

=== Transportation ===
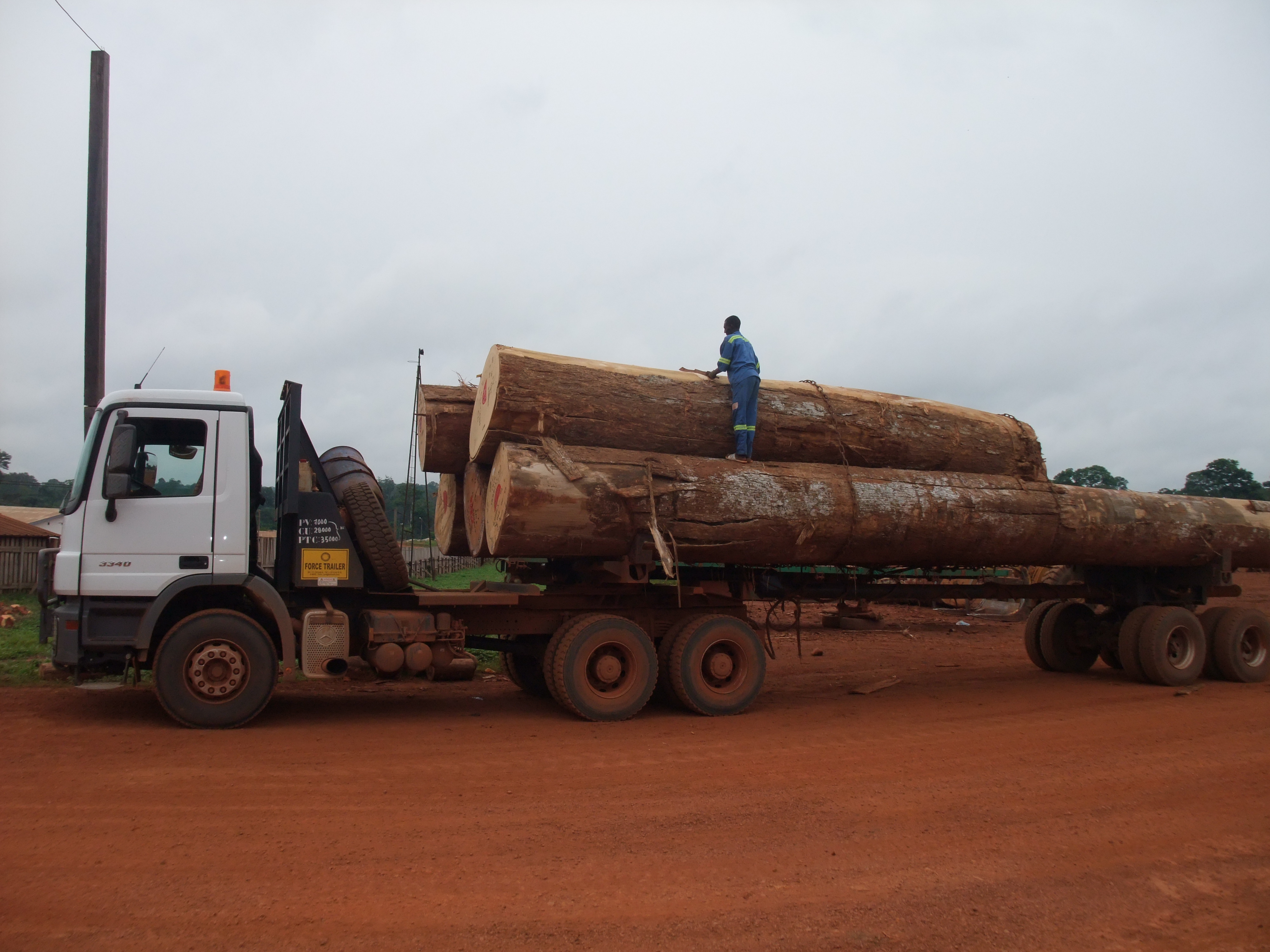
Logging truck

For its vast size, the East has very little transportation infrastructure. With the exception of a few private logging roads, travel through the province is only feasible along the three main roads that cover the territory. The first of these, National Road #10, heads east from Yaoundé, passes through Ayos on the border with the Centre Province, then continues on through the towns of Abong-Mbang, Doumé, Dimako, Bertoua, and Batouri before turning south at Ndélélé near the Central African Republic border to pass through Gari-Goumbo and Yokadouma before terminating at Moloundou on the Congo border. Another major road begins in Abong-Mbang and heads south through Mindourou to Lomié. Neither of these roads is paved, causing travel conditions in most of the province to fluctuate with the seasons. The third major route through the province is a road from Bertoua to Garoua-Boulaï on the border with Central African Republic. This road was paved in 1997 with funds from the European Union. The only public transport that covers these routes is privately owned bush taxis or mini-buses run by private groups known as GICs (French acronym meaning "group d'initiative commune").

The East is accessible via railroad, as well, through Camrail, the state-owned train system. The train comes from Douala and Yaoundé and passes through Bélabo in East Region before heading north to Ngaoundéré in the Adamawa Region. There is a regional airport in Bertoua that is officially part of state-owned Camair's network, but it has been out of service since 2003. In addition, the Nyong River is navigable from Abong-Mbang to the Centre Province town of Mbalmayo during the rainy season.

=== Tourism ===
Due to the remoteness of the region and the difficulty of travel within it, the East sees very few tourists. The area boasts huge tracts of relatively untouched rain forest, however, and non-governmental organisations such as Ecofac and the World Wildlife Fund have in recent years endeavored to make the area a viable destination for eco-tourism. Their efforts have centered on the East's national parks and forest reserves, particularly the Dja Reserve. In 2003, for example, CIAD and other NGOs began a gorilla habituation project to pave the way for camera-toting tourists to come within a few metres of the animals to see them in their natural environment. However, government corruption led to the cancellation of the initiative. Hunters may also pursue game through these reserves.

== Administration and social conditions ==
=== Government ===
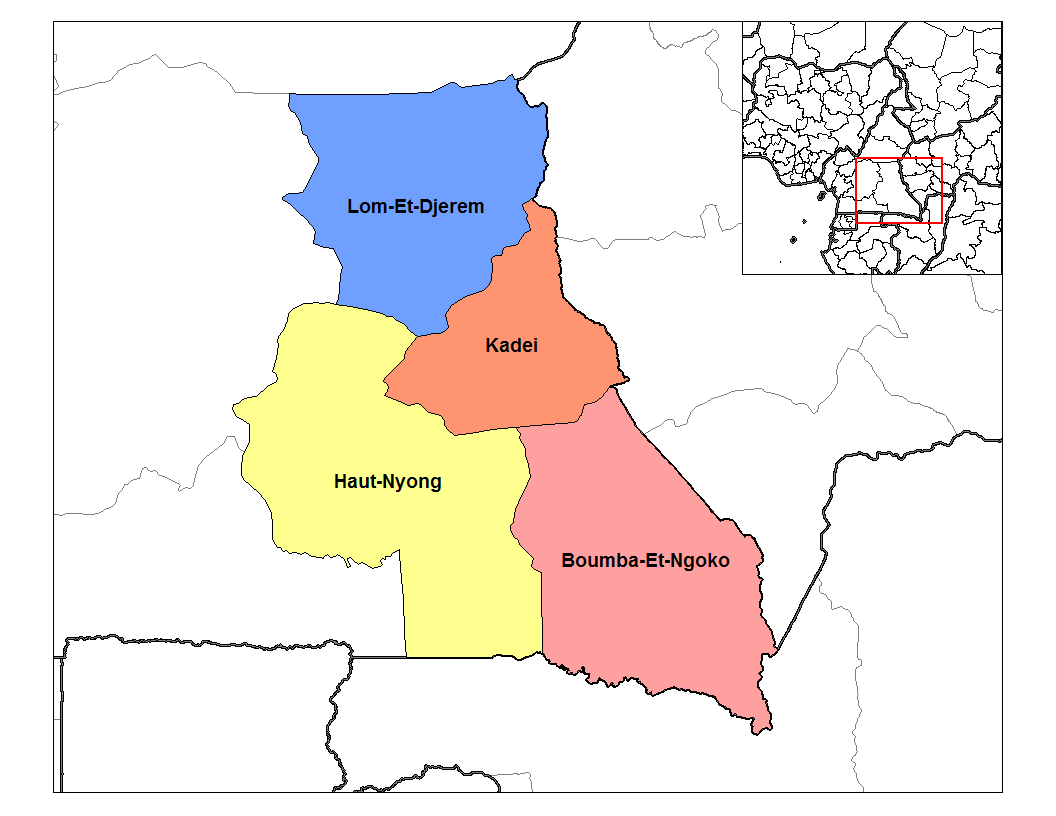
Departments of East Cameroon

A presidentially appointed governor heads the administration of the province from the capital city of Bertoua.

The East is divided into four departments (departements), each headed by a presidentially appointed senior divisional officer or prefect (prefet):

1. Boumba-et-Ngoko (Boumba and Ngoko) takes up the southeast and has its centre in Yokadouma.
2. Haut-Nyong (Upper Nyong) occupies the southwestern portion and is centred on Abong-Mbang.
3. Kadey (also spelled Kadéï or Kadei) forms the central-eastern portion of the territory and is governed from Batouri.
4. Lom-et-Djérem (Lom and Djérem) consists of the north of the province and has its capital in Bertoua.

Each of these divisions is further divided into sub-divisions, each headed by a sub-divisional officer or sub-prefect (sous-prefet). Individual towns usually have a mayor, and some villages have a traditional chief, though this person usually holds little actual authority.

Cameroonian politicians have traditionally ignored the East. The region is simply too underpopulated to have much influence in countrywide elections. Eastern residents have in recent years called for more infrastructure improvements from the government, especially the paving of roads. Candidates for office and government officials do occasionally make stops in the region to address such issues, but their message is often simply an excuse for why such improvements would be detrimental to the region. For example, they often argue that paved roads would only allow the forests upon which the region depends to be cut down at an even faster rate.

=== Education ===
School attendance rates are difficult to determine for the East, but are generally higher in the towns than in the villages. Primary schools are fairly widely distributed, but most of the region's secondary schools are located in larger villages or in towns, meaning that students from more remote areas must walk long distances, stay with relatives, or rent rooms during the school year. In addition, school fees keep many families from sending their children for an education.

=== Health ===
Due to its thick forests and equatorial climate, the East is home to a host of tropical diseases. Chief among these is malaria, which remains a major cause of death in the region. Dengue fever, filariasis, typhoid fever, and tuberculosis are also endemic. In 1997 and 1998, health professionals recorded outbreaks of what may have been the Ebola virus in the southwest near Ngoila. The World Health Organization today doubts that this "bloody diarrhea" was in fact that virus, however.

As with most of sub-Saharan Africa, poor sanitation is a major source of illness for people in the East. Diseases spread this way include schistosomiasis, brucellosis, hepatitis A, amoebic dysentery, bacterial dysentery, and giardia.

In recent years, the East has come into focus for its role in the AIDS epidemic. This largely stems from the region's position as a transportation network for logging vehicles. In addition to the transportation network, the construction of the Chad/Cameroon pipeline has fueled the increase of Prostitution along these routes, with professional sex workers operating in virtually every town and village along the province's roads. Government estimates report the HIV rate among operators of these logging vehicles to be about 18% and that of the sex workers to be as high as 30%.

Government efforts in the 1980s to improve the number and quality of hospitals in Cameroon have made healthcare more available in the region. Most hospitals and clinics are located in the larger towns, however, meaning that the seriously ill have little chance of getting to treatment in many cases. Traditional medicine is still largely practiced in the East, as well, and many people ascribe various maladies to the workings of witches or sorcerers.

== History ==
=== Early population movements ===
Archaeological finds around Batouri, Bertoua, and Bétaré-Oya attest to human presence in the territory of the East Province since prehistoric times. The earliest inhabitants of the region are commonly assumed to have been the Bambenga pygmies, part of the larger Twa group who may be descendants of the pygmies mentioned in Egyptian and Classical sources. The pygmies were followed by waves of migrating Bantus in the 17th and 18th centuries. The Maka stayed to occupy the territories surrounding what is now Massaména and Abong-Mbang, and the Njem settled around present-day Mindourou and Lomié. The Kaka settled in the territory that is now Ndélélé. A later wave of immigration came in the 19th century when the Beti-Pahuin pushed in from the west to escape pressures from the Babouti. This second Bantu invasion did not get far, however, as the Fang-Beti soon encountered the Maka and Njem and were unable to press on further. Of these, the Maka-Njem moved into the territory first, after being forced from their home north of the Lom River by migrating Beti-Pahuin peoples, themselves fleeing the Vute, Mbum, Gbaya, and, ultimately, the Fulani. The Maka stayed to occupy the territories surrounding what is now Massaména and Abong-Mbang, and the Njem settled around present-day Mindourou and Lomié. The Kaka settled in the territory that is now Ndélélé.

The Adama-Ubangi peoples came into the territory as part of this same general migration, though they were usually the ones pushing the Bantu peoples further south. Gbaya tradition says that they moved into the region of Bertoua under a leader named Ndiba. His son, Mbartoua, was in power when the Germans arrived.

=== The coming of the Europeans ===
For the five centuries or so since the Portuguese first reached the coast of present Cameroon, European explorers made little attempt to push into the intererior. The region was a source of slaves, which were shipped out via the port at Douala or via the Congo River, though the numbers of natives taken were much smaller than in areas closer to the coast.

The French were the first Europeans to enter the region when they began exploring the Congo Basin in the mid-19th century. It was the Germans, however, who first gained formal control over the area, establishing the eastern border through negotiations with France between 1885 and 1908. Ironically, the earliest German colonists to the eastern forests were largely entering unknown territory. The Germans set to work building roads and establishing plantations, both endeavors requiring forced labor by the natives. This often led to violence, such as when the Gbaya under Mbartoua led a rebellion in the Bertoua region in 1903. Another revolt occurred when the Kaka protested their loss of lucrative trade opportunities that they had enjoyed in pre-colonial days.

After the end of World War I in 1918, Germany was forced to cede its colony to France. The French divided Cameroon into nine administrative areas, and most of what is now the East Province fell into the Doumé-Loume-Yokadouma district with its capital in Doumé. The French largely continued the colonial practices of the Germans, with forced labor continuing into the early 20th century. They made further infrastructure improvements, as well, such as improving the road from Yaoundé to Bertoua and on to Garoua-Boulaï.

=== Post-independence ===
The boundaries of the East Province were finalised after Cameroon gained independence in 1961. The capital was moved from Doumé to Bertoua in 1972.

The region has largely been ignored since independence. One of the few developments of note include the extension of the railroad from Yaoundé to Bélabo under the presidency of Ahmadou Ahidjo.

In the first months of 2014, thousands of refugees fleeing the violence in the Central African Republic arrived in Cameroon via the border towns of the East Region, Adamawa Region, and North Region.

== Culture ==
=== Traditional dance accessories ===
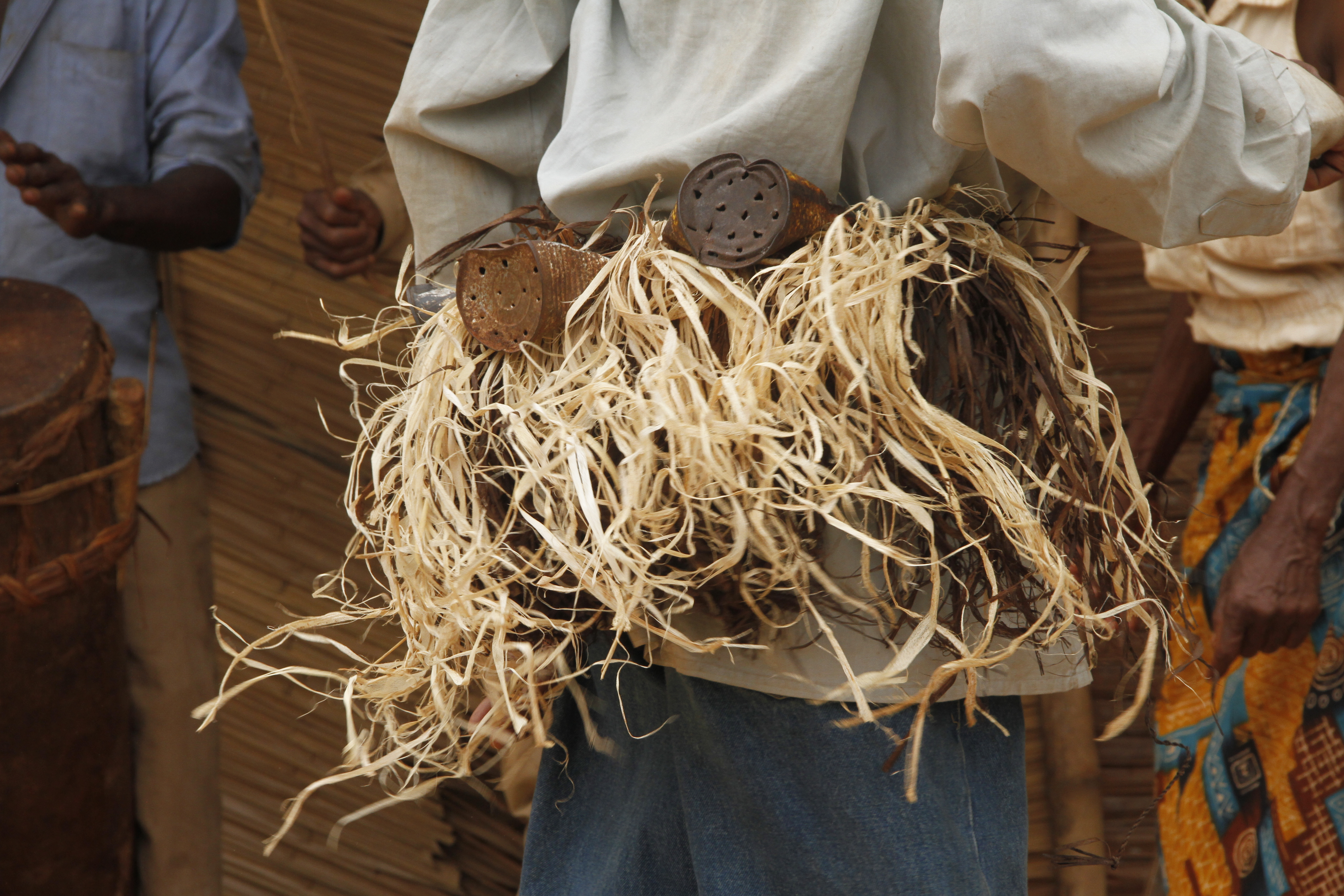

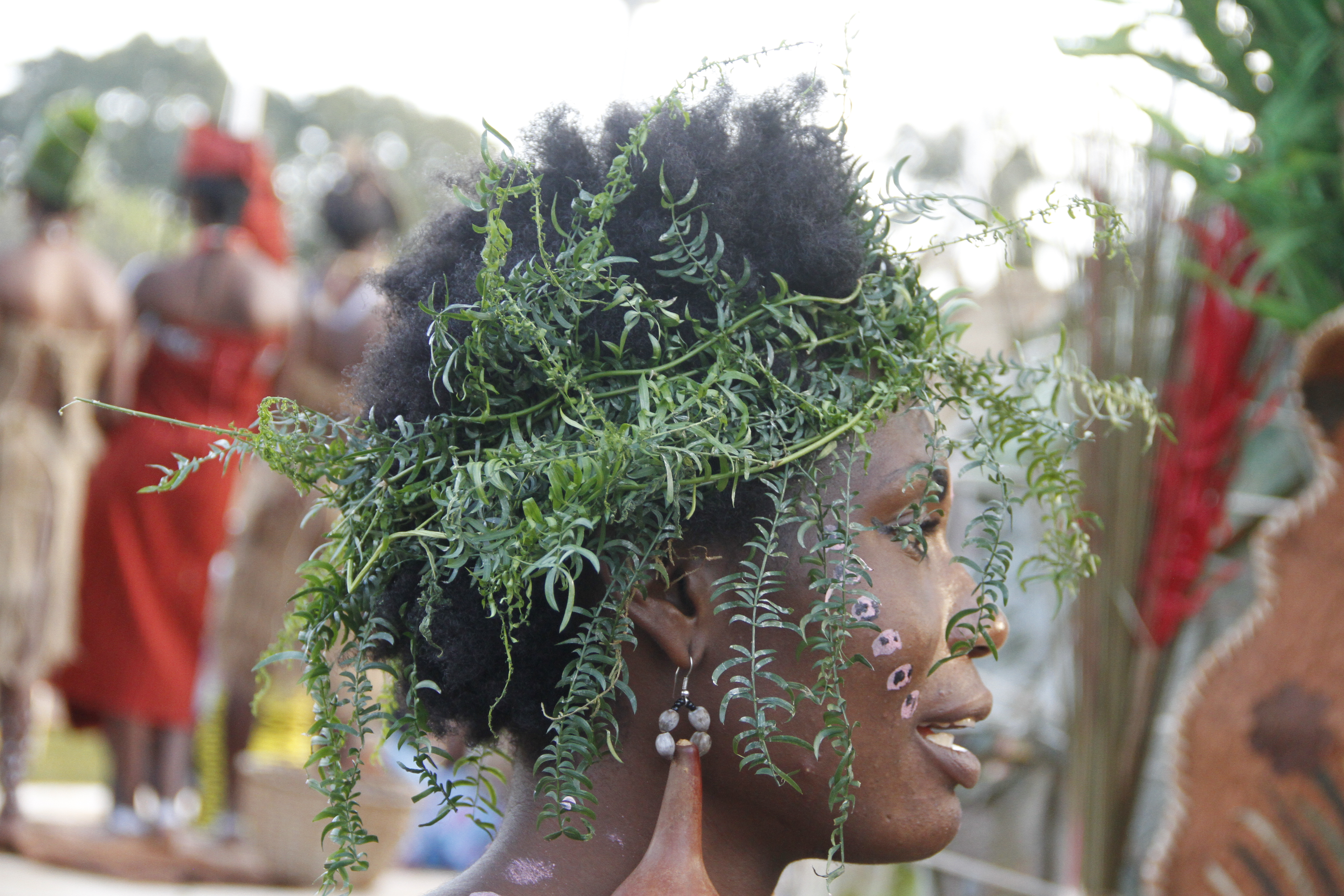

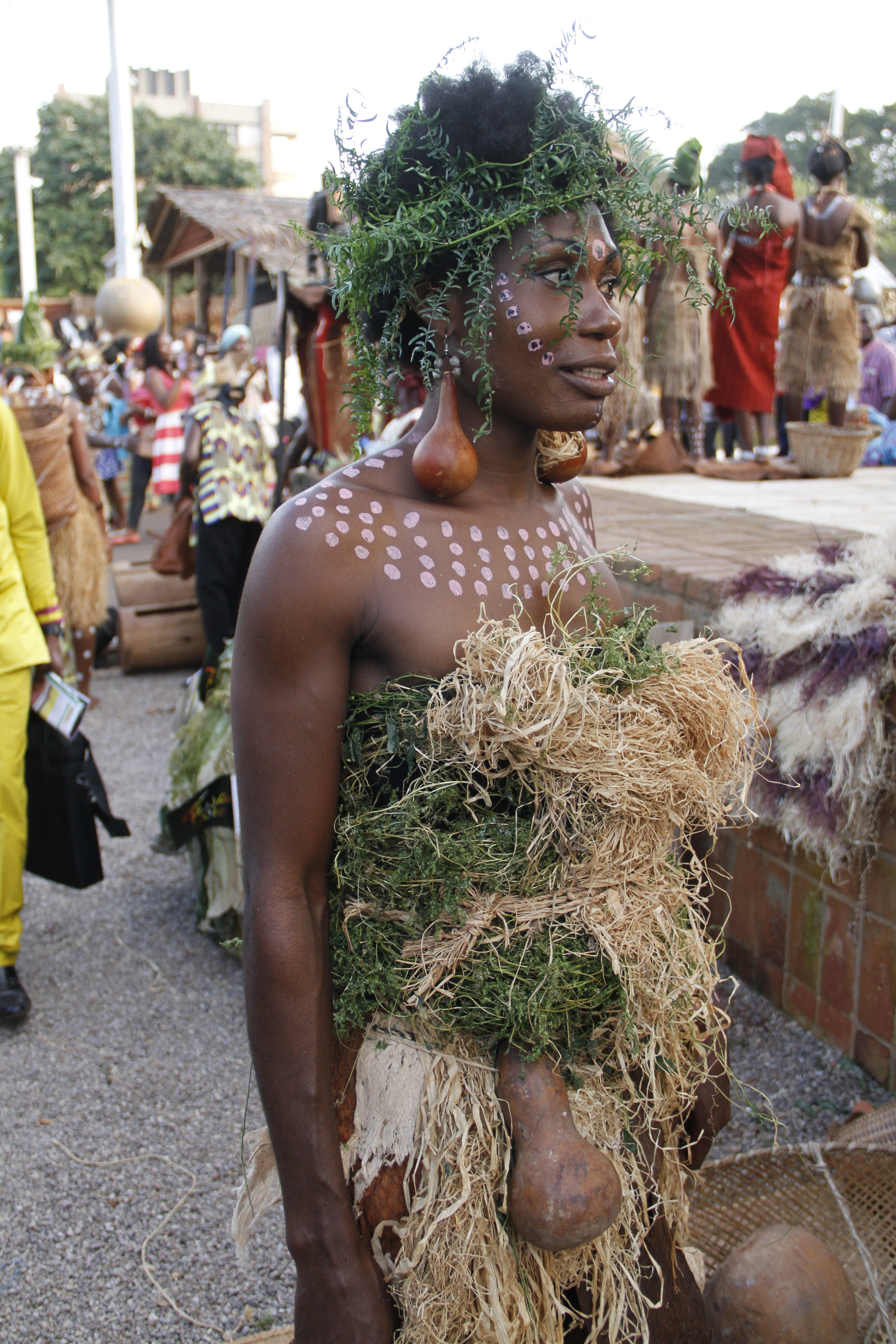

=== Traditional Dances ===
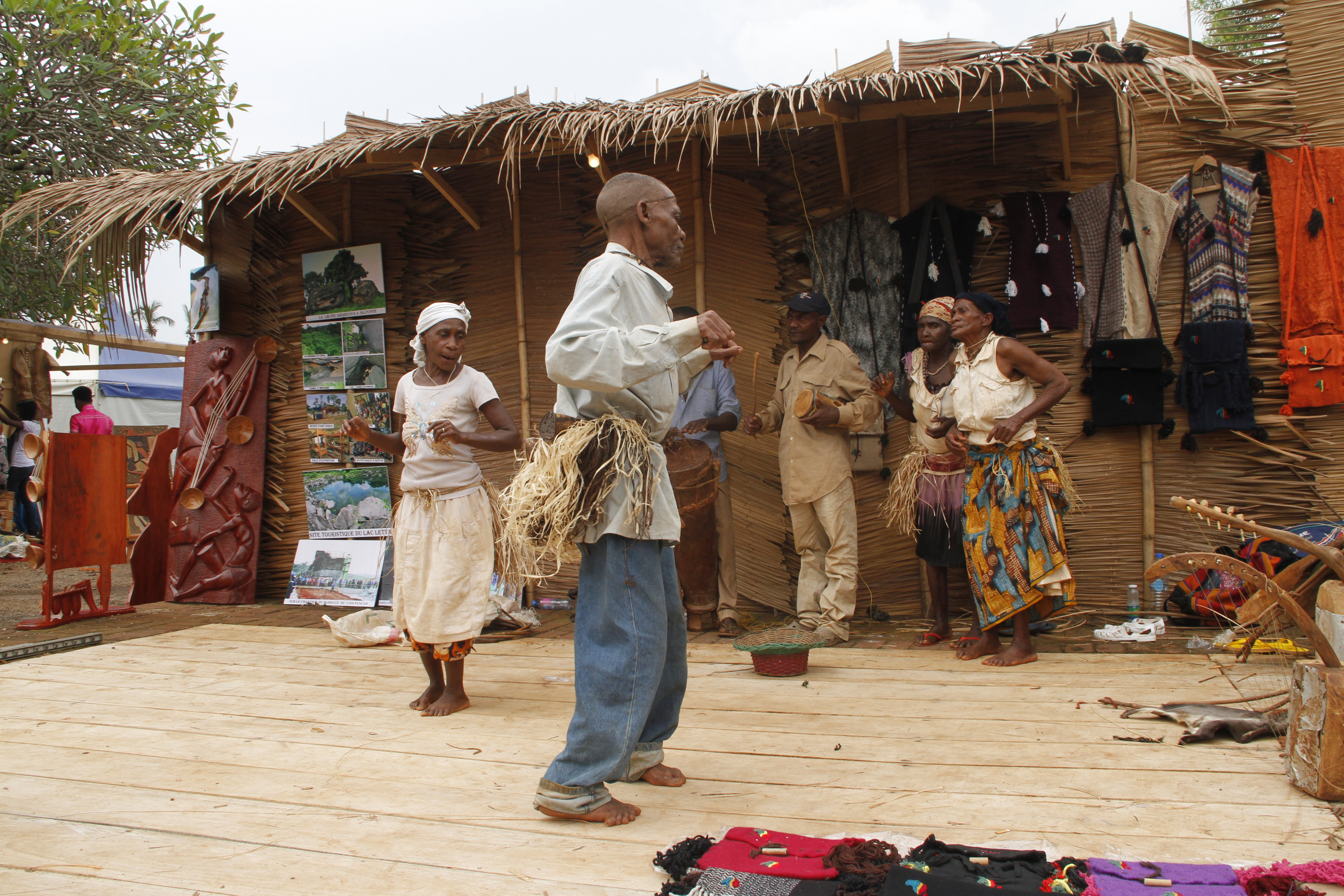

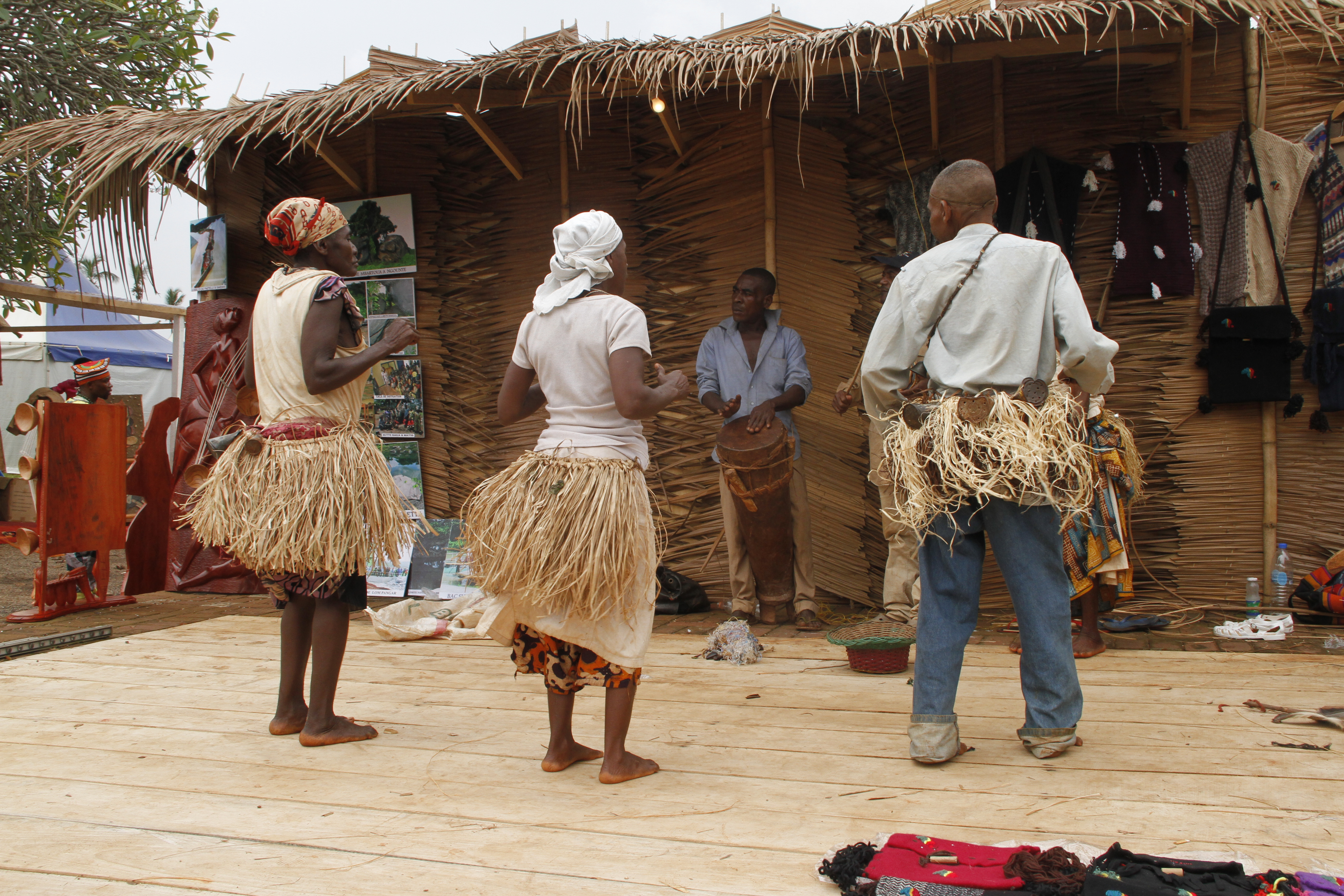

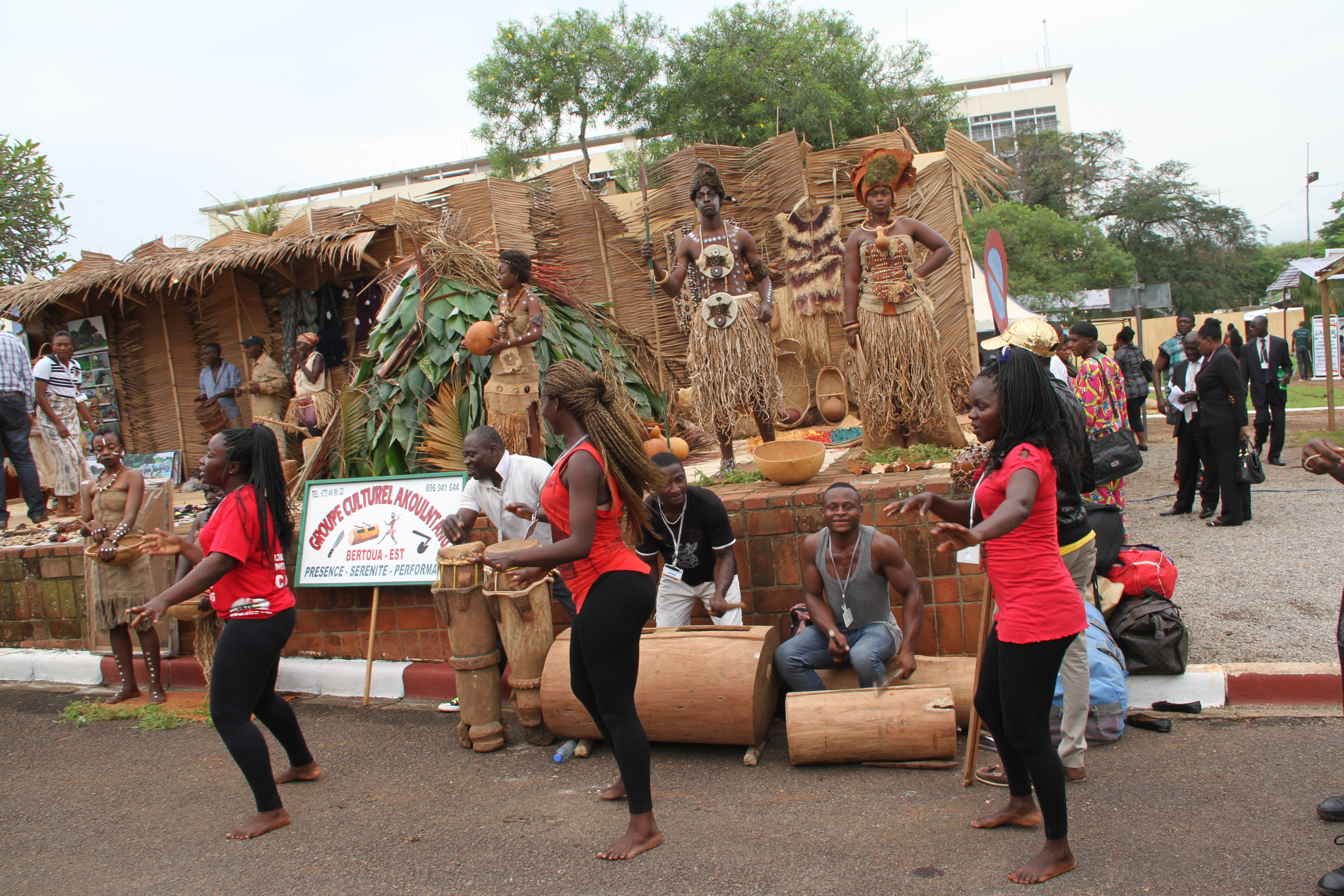

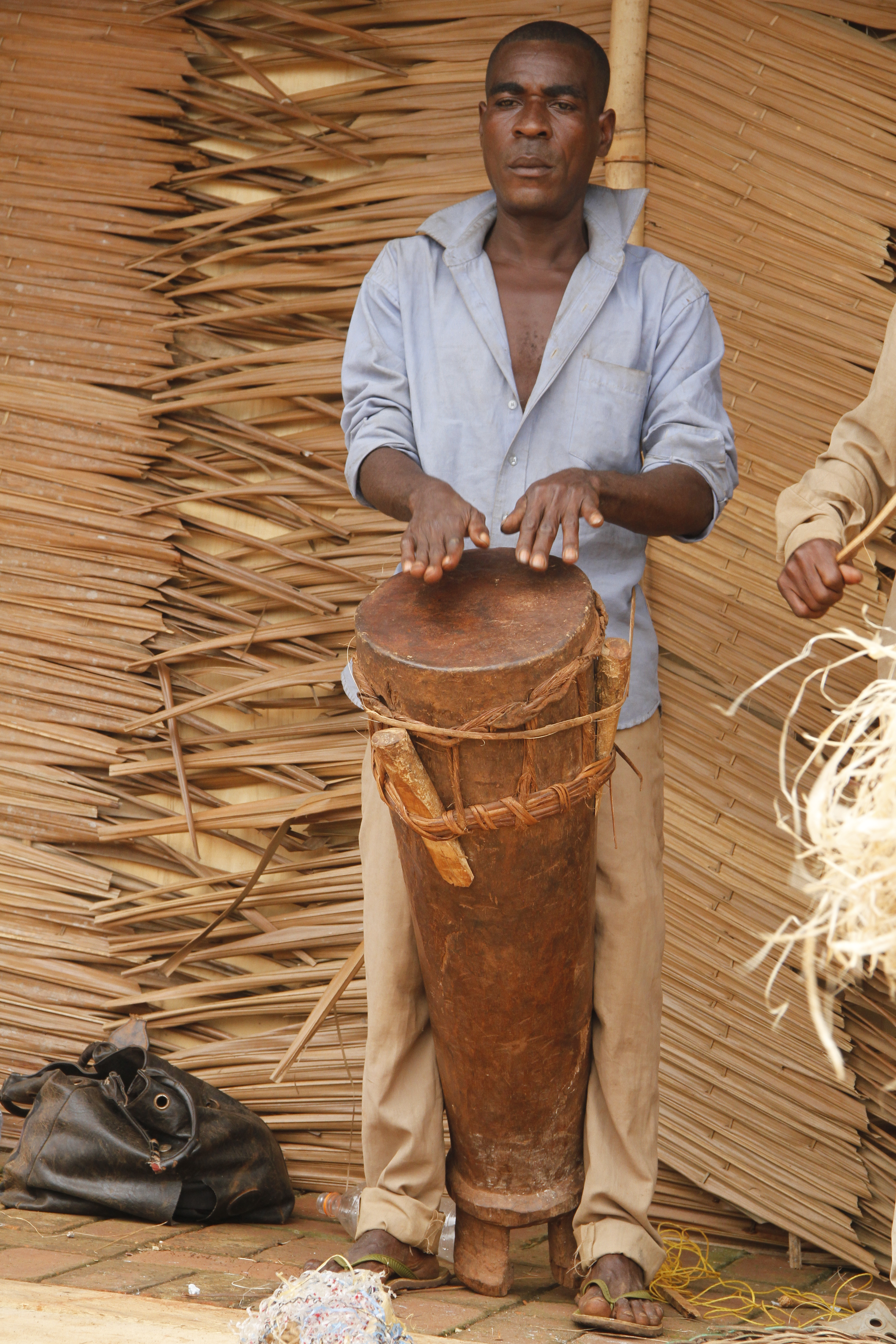
Tam-tam player

=== Traditional musical instruments ===
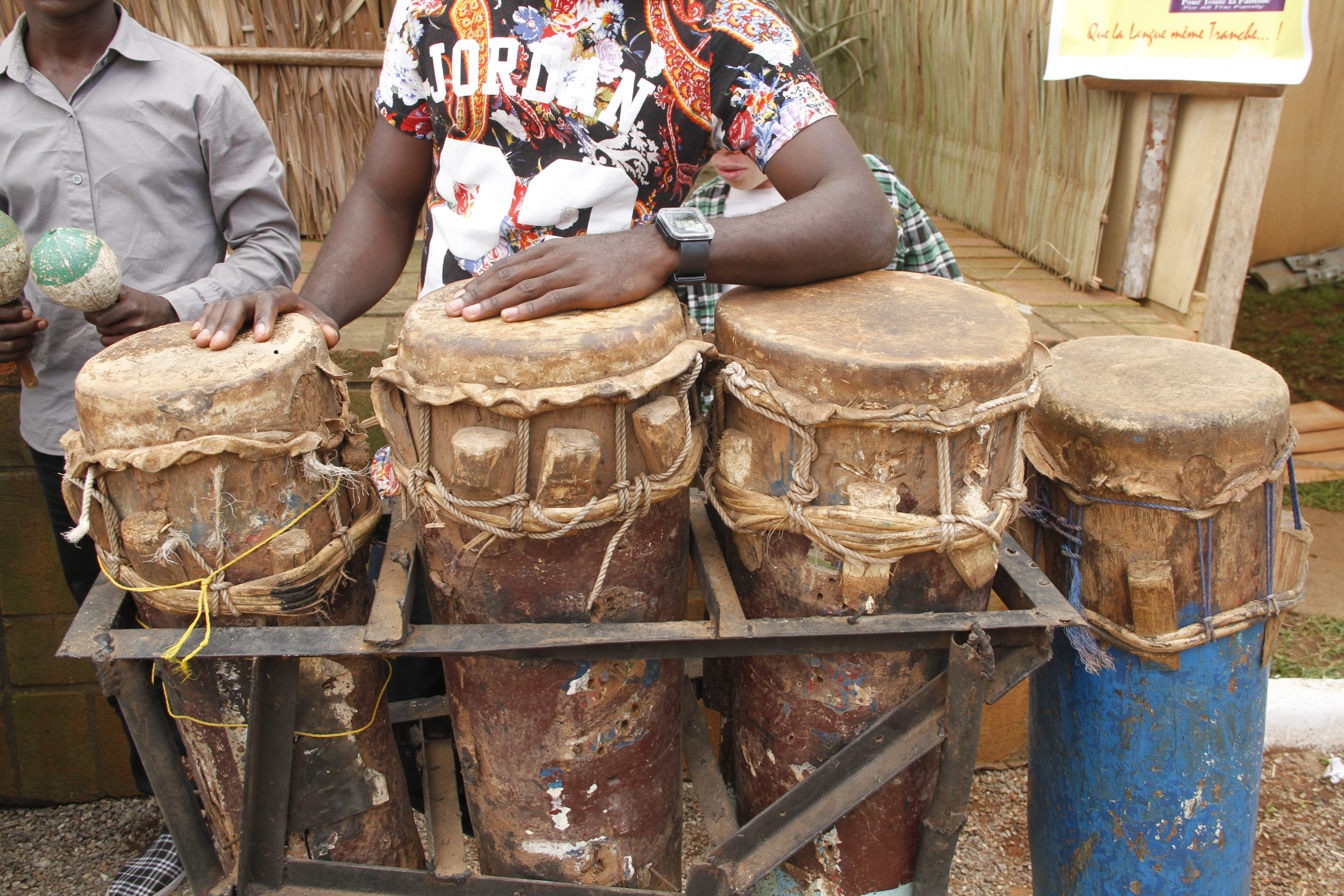
Tam-tam

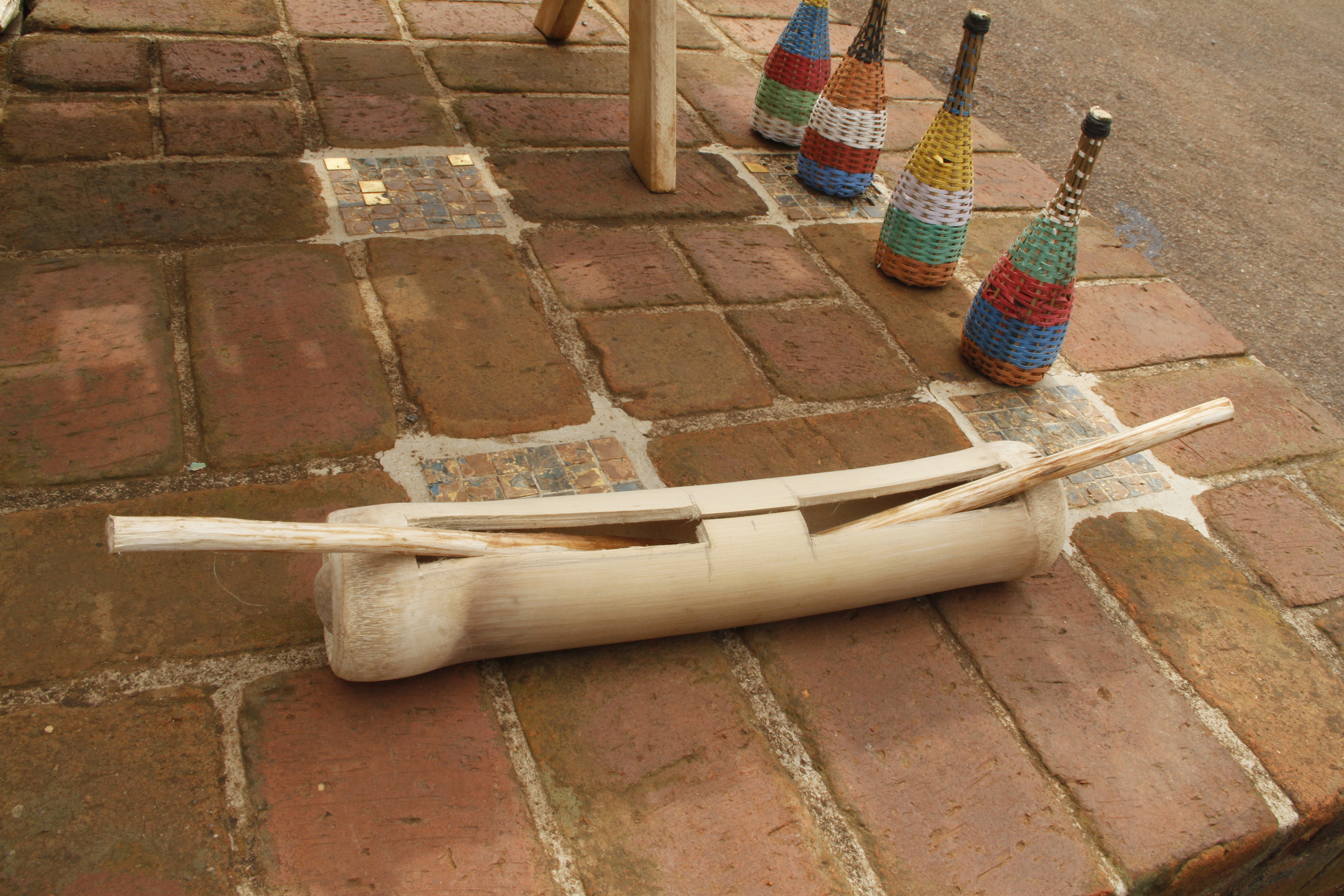
Balafon
