= Boumba River =

Boumba River Bumba, Wumo
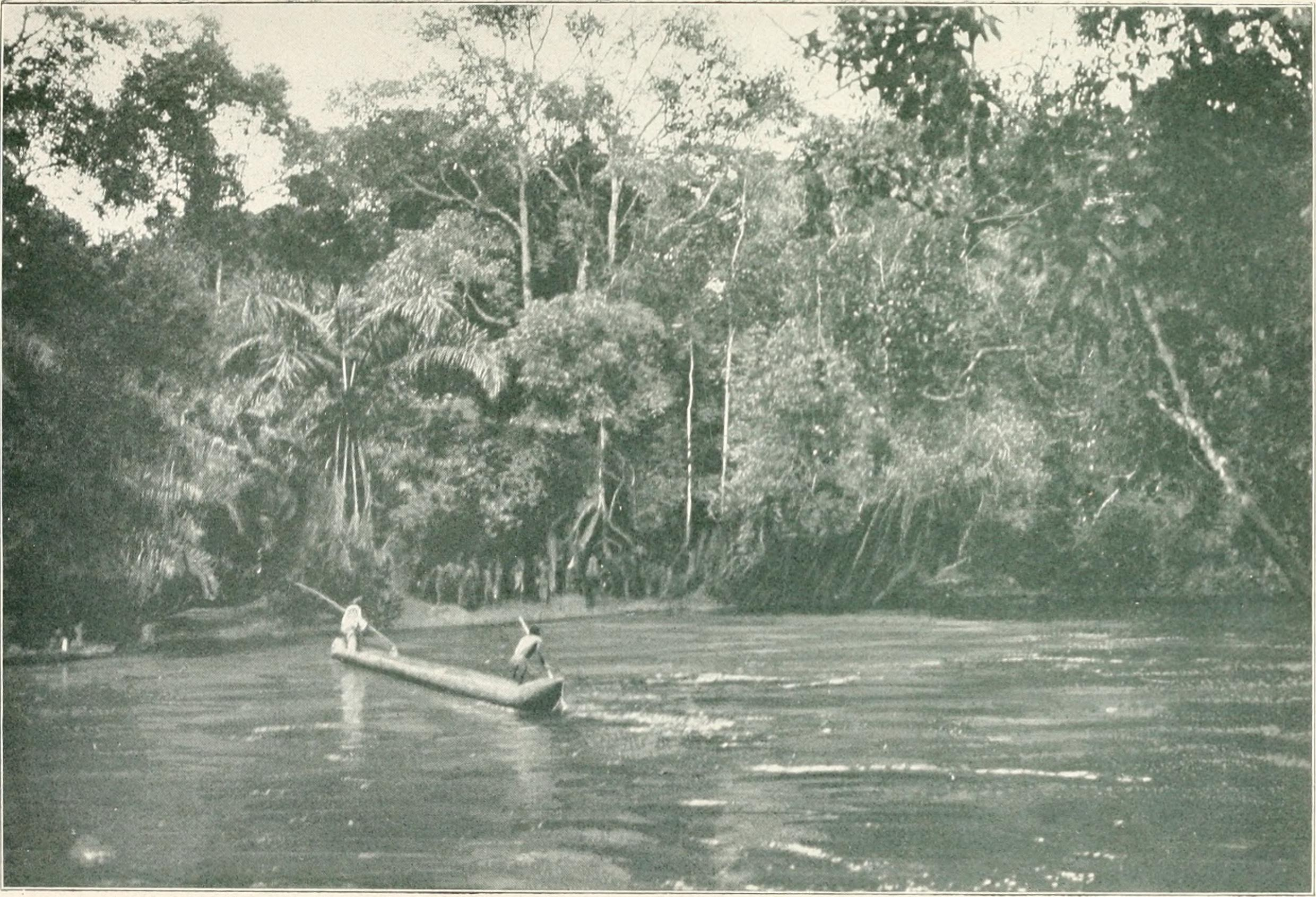
- The Boumba River 1911

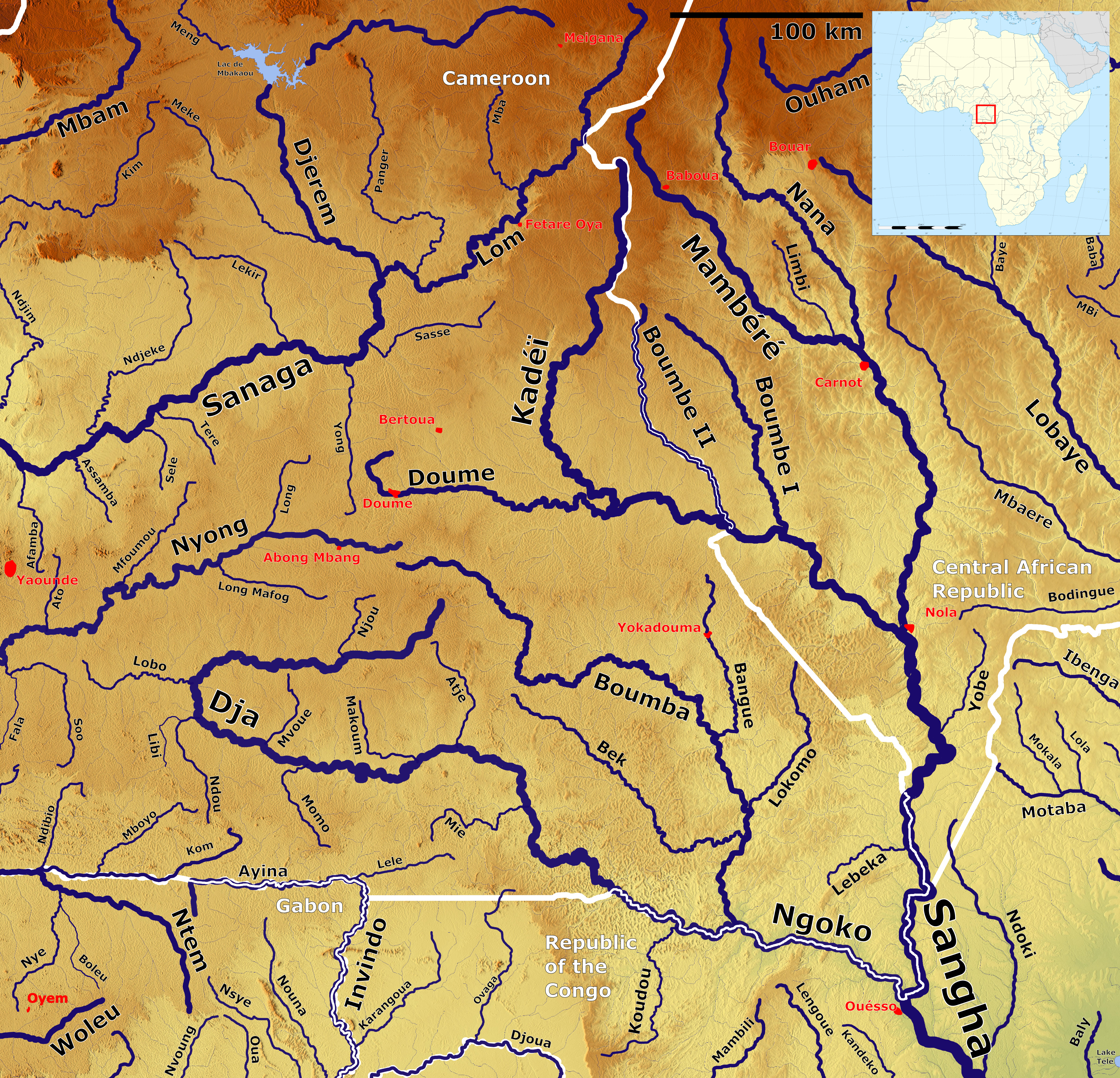

Location
- Country: Cameroon
- Regions: East Region

Physical characteristics
- Source
  - location: Near Abong-Mbang
  - coordinates: 3°52′00″N 13°28′00″E
  - elevation: 680 m (2,230 ft)
- Mouth: Confluence with the Dja River
  - location: Near Moloundou
  - coordinates: 2.035382°N 15.193748°E
  - elevation: 350 m (1,150 ft)
- Length: 530 km (330 mi)
- Basin size: 27,400 km^{2} (10,579 mi^{2})
- Discharge
  - location: Moloundou
  - average: 285 m^{3}/s (10,100 cu ft/s)

Basin features
- River system: Congo River
- Tributaries
  - left: Lokomo
  - right: Medoum, Bouda, Ndjwe, Bek

Boumba River is a river in the South Cameroon Plateau of southeast Cameroon.

== Geography ==
The river rises in the Abong-Mbang region. The Boumba is almost 530 km long, and has a catchment of 27.400 km²

== Hydrometry ==
The flow of the river was measured at Biwala in m³/s

View chart definition.

== Ecology ==
The river is a tributary of the Dja River and is adjacent to the Boumba Bek National Park, which is located between the Boumba and the Bek River. The forested area around the river is a diverse ecosystem. Logging is an industry in the area. The remote region is home to the Baka. Communities in the area engage in subsistence farming, hunting, fishing and gathering. The area is also used illegal commercial bushmeat hunters and traders and trophy hunters. Parrots and ivory are also smuggled through the area.

== Trivia ==
- The area is believed to be a possible origin of the HIV virus.
- The legendary Mokèlé-mbèmbé was reportedly sighted on the river in 2000.
