= Boumba-et-Ngoko =

- Department
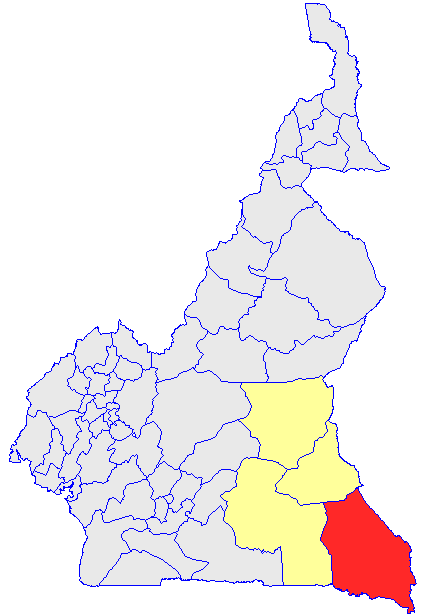
- Department location in Cameroon

- Location within Cameroon Location within Africa
- Country: Cameroon
- Province: East Province
- Capital: Yokadouma

Government
  - Governor: Célestin Mendouga
  - Deputy Governor: Sébastien Ndumbé

Area
  - Total: 30,389 km^{2} (11,733 sq mi)

Population (2001)
  - Total: 116,702
  - Density: 3.8403/km^{2} (9.9463/sq mi)
- Time zone: UTC+1 (WAT)

Boumba-et-Ngoko is a department of East Province in Cameroon. The department covers an area of 30,389 km^{2} and as of 2001 had a total population of 116,702. The capital of the department lies at Yokadouma.

== Subdivisions ==
The department is divided administratively into 4 communes and in turn into villages.

=== Communes ===
- Gari-Gombo
- Moloundou
- Salapoumbé
- Yokadouma

== See also ==
- Communes of Cameroon
