= Ferrallitisation =

Ferrallitisation is the process in which rock is changed into a soil consisting of clay (kaolinite) and sesquioxides, in the form of hydrated oxides of iron and aluminium. In humid tropical areas, with consistently high temperatures and rainfall for all or most of the year, chemical weathering rapidly breaks down the rock. This at first produces clays which later also break down to form silica. The silica is removed by leaching and the sesquioxides of iron and aluminium remain, giving the characteristic red colour of many tropical soils. Ferrallitisation is the reverse of podsolisation, where silica remains and the iron and aluminum are removed. In tropical rain forests with rain throughout the year, ferrallitic soils develop. In savanna areas, with altering dry and wet climates, ferruginous soils occur.
