= Gari-Gombo =

Coordinates: 3.9357°N 15.1091°E

- Commune and town
- Interactive map of Gari-Gombo
- Country: Cameroon
- Time zone: UTC+1 (WAT)

Gari-Gombo is a town and commune in Cameroon.

== See also ==
- Communes of Cameroon
