= Yokadouma =

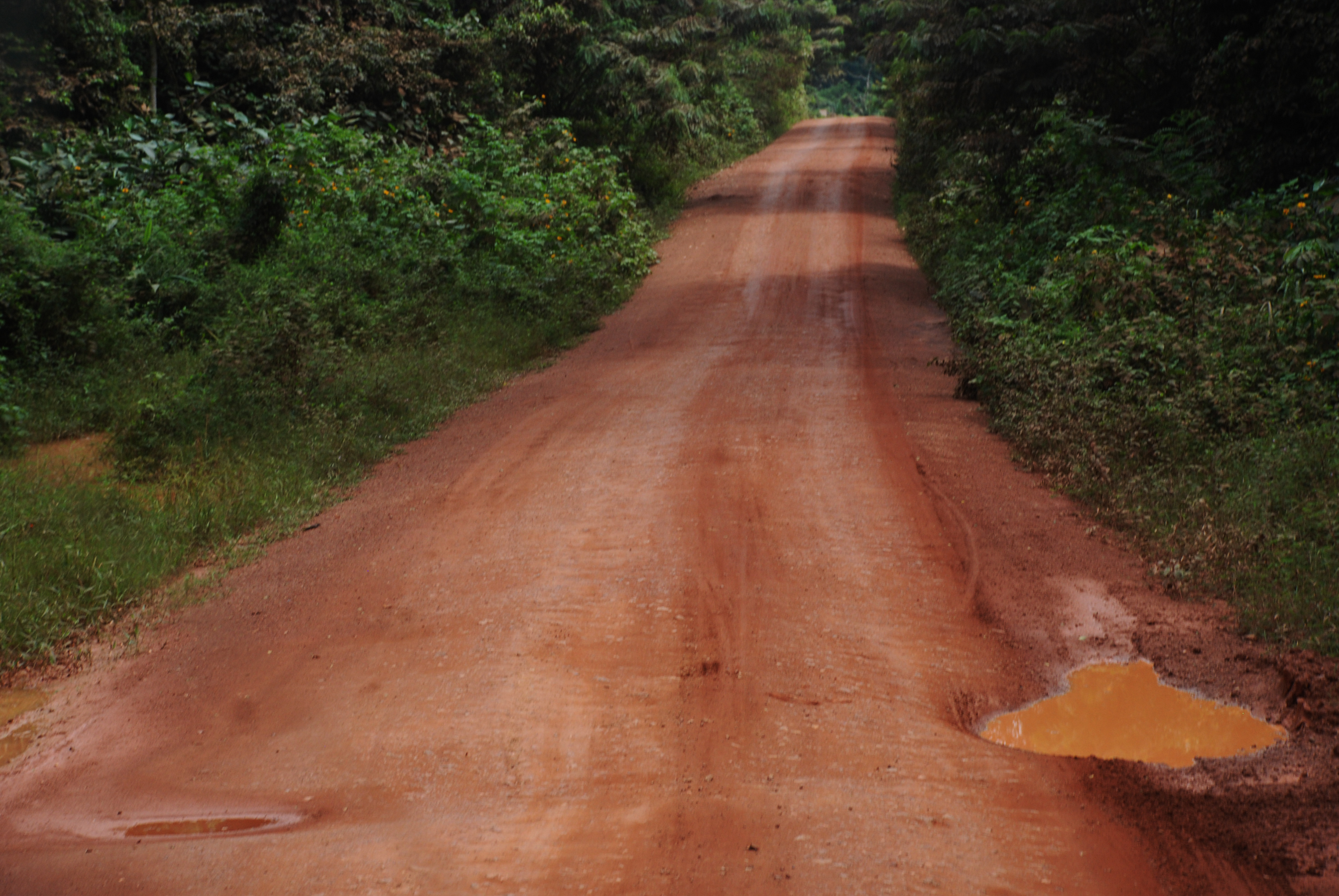
- Yokadouma road

- Location in Cameroon
- Coordinates: 3°31′N 15°03′E
- Country: Cameroon
- Region: East Region
- Division: Boumba-et-Ngoko
- Elevation: 560 m (1,840 ft)

Population (2012)
  - Total: 24,430

Yokadouma is a town and Catholic bishopric in eastern Cameroon, lying near the border with the Central African Republic. It was an early French administrative centre.

During the colonial period, Yokadouma was the centre for a widespread but ill-fated immunisation campaign against sleeping sickness, known as 'lomidinisation'. The administration of the drug had little preventative benefit and in many cases the colonial doctors cut corners. In one incident on November 15, 1954, known as the "accident of Yokadouma", the French doctor misadministered the drug to such an extent that more than 300 people contracted gangrene and 32 more died. It has been described as "one of the most violent medical catastrophes in African history."

Its Cathédrale Marie Reine de la Paix, dedicated in 2010 to Our Lady Queen of Peace, is the cathedral episcopal see of the Roman Catholic Diocese of Yokadouma (founded 1991).

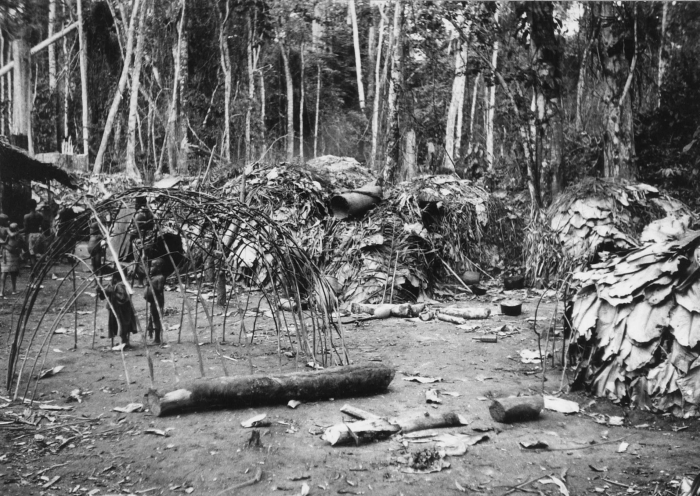
The pygmy settlement just south of Yokadouma, photographed in 1965.

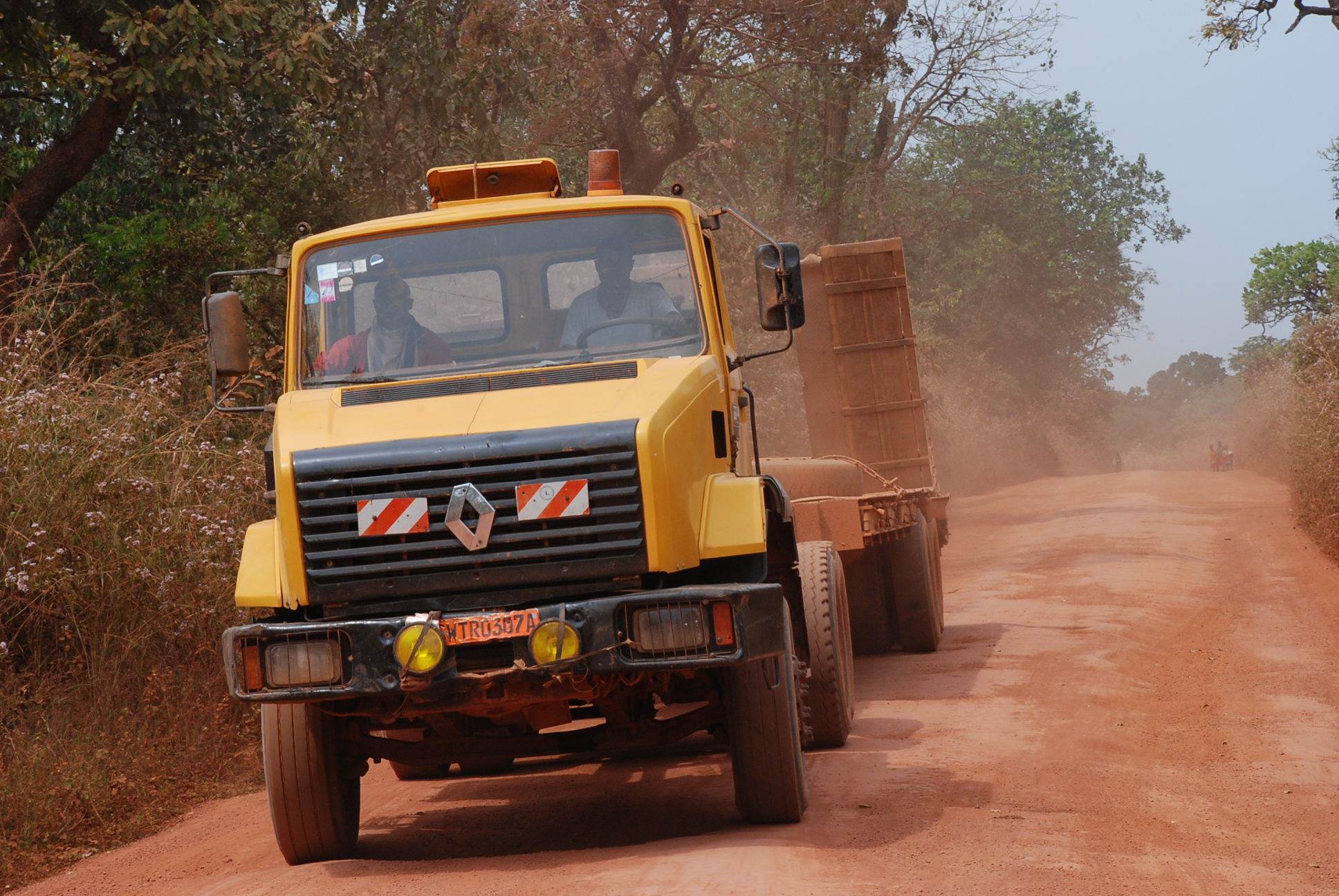
A truck in Yakadouma.

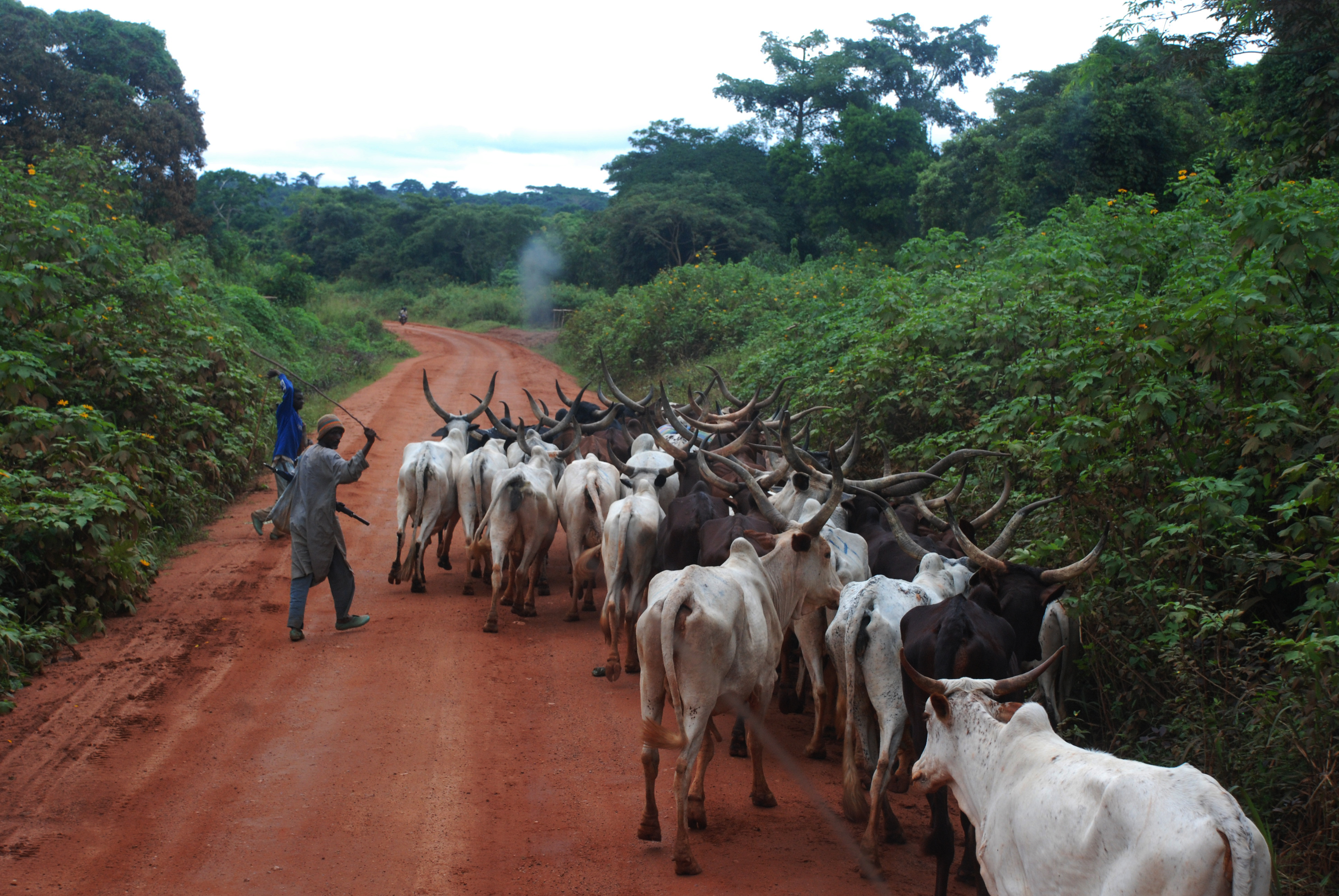
A caravan of oxen being herded through Yakadouma.

== See also ==
- Communes of Cameroon
