= Dja River =

River in Central Africa

Coordinates: 1°55′10″N 15°44′46″E

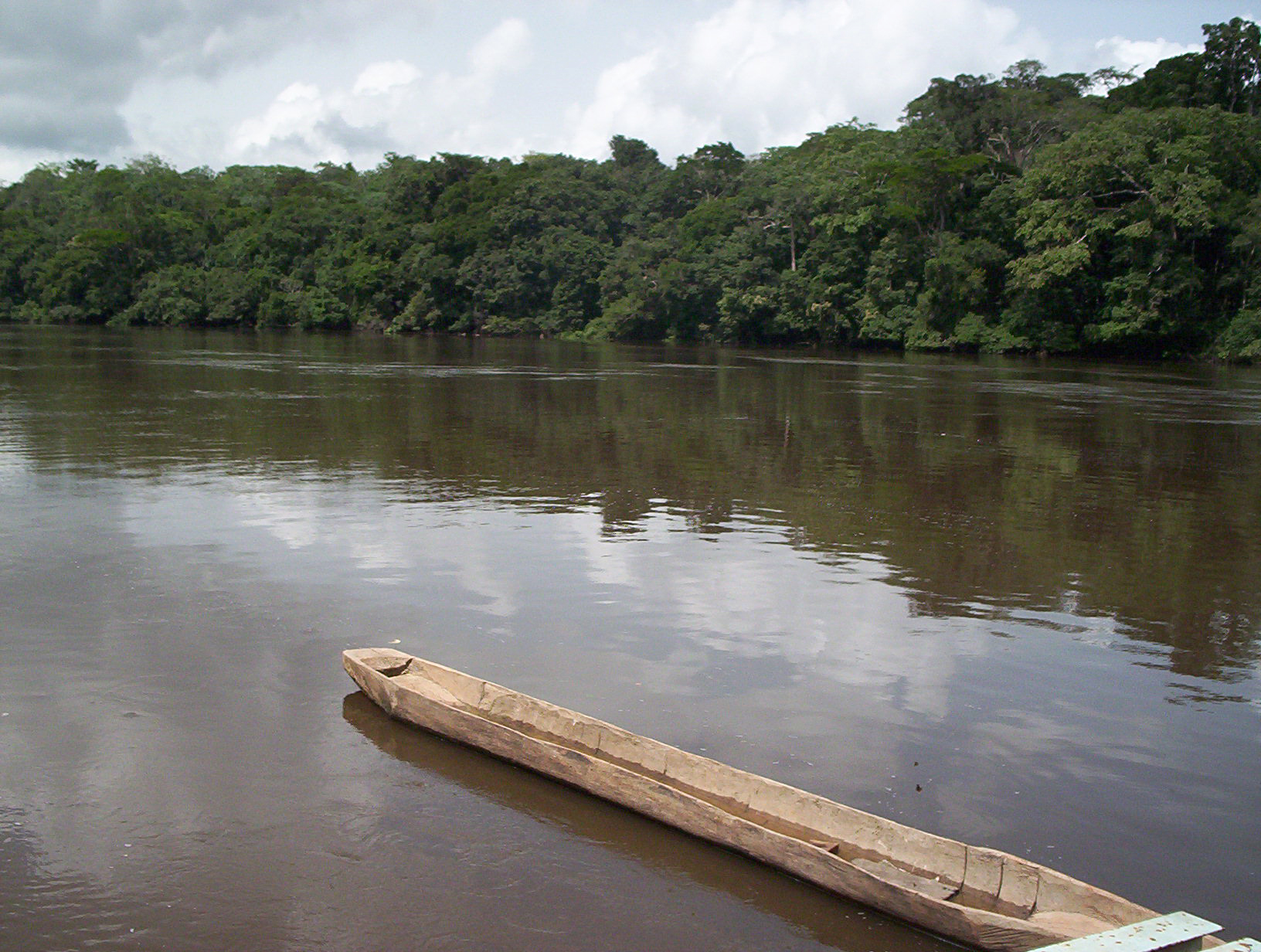
Dja River

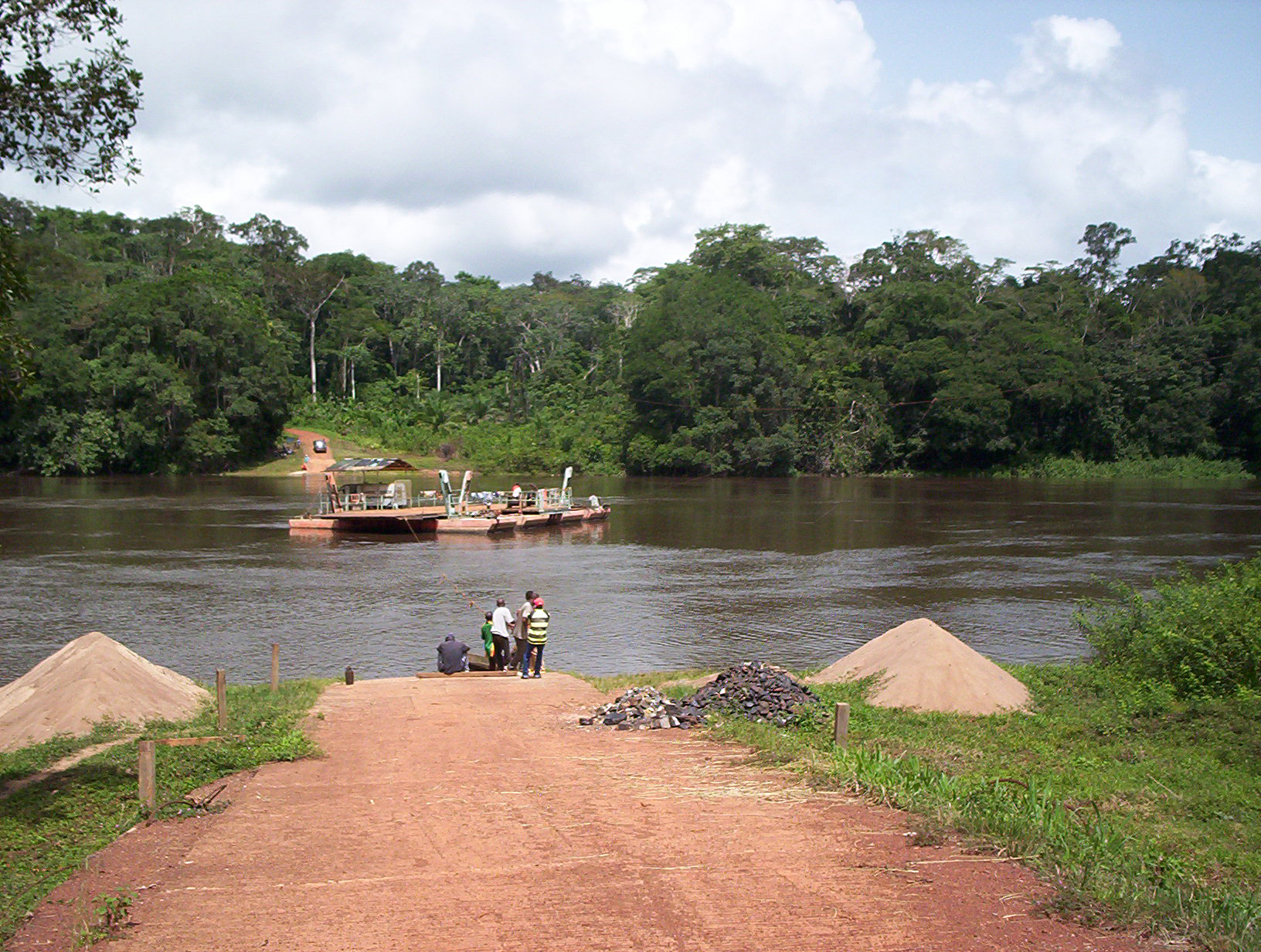
Crossing the Dja River on a Ferry

The Dja River (also known as the Ngoko River) is a stream in west-central Africa. It forms part of Cameroon–Republic of Congo border and has a course of roughly 720 kilometres (450 mi).

Rising southeast of the southeastern Cameroon town of Abong-Mbang, the Dja Faunal Reserve, which was named a UNESCO World Heritage Site in 1987, lies along the banks of its upper course. It protects one of the largest tracts of tropical rainforest in Africa. Forming its natural boundary, and almost completely encircling the reserve (except to the south-west), cliffs run along the course of the river in the south part of the reserve for 60 km and are associated with a section of the river which is broken by rapids and waterfalls. Following its course in the reserve, the Dja flows approximately southeast past Moloundou, below which small boats can navigate. At Ouésso, in the Republic of Congo, it empties into the Sangha River.

Every year, poachers travel up the Dja for central Nki National Park, where elephant ivory is abundant. Strong currents on the river are a deterrent for half the year, but after that, according to freelance journalist Jemini Pandya, the fauna is easy to prey upon.

== See also ==
- Communes of Cameroon
