= Baka language =

Ubangian dialect cluster spoken by Baka people of Cameroon and Gabon

Baka
- Native to: Cameroon, Gabon; minor groups separate in the Central African Republic
- Ethnicity: Baka
- Native speakers: (70,000 cited 1988–2010)
- Language family: Niger-Congo?: Atlantic-Congo; Volta-Congo; Adamawa–Ubangian; Ubangian; Sere–Ngbaka–Mba; Ngbaka–Mba; Ngbaka; Western; Baka–Gundi; Baka
- Writing system: Latin

Language codes
- ISO 639-3: Variously: bkc – Baka gdi – Gundi (Ngundi) gnz – Ganzi bme – Massa (Limassa)
- Glottolog: baka1271
- ELP: Baka (East Region, Cameroon); Ganzi; Gundi

Baka (also called Be-bayaga, Be-bayaka, and Bibaya de L’est) is a dialect cluster of Ubangian languages spoken by the Baka Pygmies of Cameroon and Gabon. Ethnically, the people are closely related to the Aka, collectively known as the Mbenga (Bambenga). However, the languages are not closely related within the Atlantic-Congo family, apart from some vocabulary dealing with the forest economy, which suggests the Aka may have shifted to Bantu, with an estimated 15,000 people having done so.

== Geographic distribution ==
Baka is spoken in much of the southeastern forest zone of Cameroon, in:

- Eastern Region
  - Kadey department (Ndélélé and Mbang communes)
  - Haut-Nyong department (Dimako, Doumé, Abong-Mbang, Lomié, and Ngoyla communes)
  - Boumba-et-Ngoko department (Moloundou, Yokadouma, and Gari-Gombo communes)
- Southern Region
  - Dja-et-Lobo department (Bengbis, Meyomessala, Sangmélima, Djoum, Oveng, and Mintom communes)

The Baka live together with other ethnic groups that are generally located along the main roads. The Baka speak a language very close to that of the Ngbaka Ma'bo of the Central African Republic, which clearly indicates that the Baka of Cameroon had recently arrived from an area much further to the east. In Cameroon, they are referred to as Eastern Pygmies, as opposed to the Bagyali, Pygmy groups from Océan Department who speak a Bantu language (A80 subgroup). The Baka number 25,000 in Cameroon. They are also found in Gabon (Phillips 1980) and in the Central African Republic.

== Classification ==
Approximately 30% of Baka's vocabulary is not Ubangian. Much of this concerns a specialized forest economy, such as words for edible plants, medicinal plants, and honey collecting, and has been posited as the remnant of an ancestral Pygmy language which has otherwise vanished. However, apart from some words shared with the Aka, there is no evidence for a wider linguistic affiliation with any of the other Pygmy peoples.

== Varieties ==
It is unclear if Gundi (Ngundi), Ganzi, and Massa (Limassa), are mutually intelligible with Baka proper. Most Massa have shifted to Gundi, which is spoken by 9,000 people.

The Ngombe tribe speaks Gundi. It may have been confused in the literature with the Ngombe population speaking the Bangandu language.

== Phonology ==
=== Consonants ===
		Bilabial	Alveolar	Palatal	Velar	Labio- velar	Glottal
Plosive	plain	p	t		k	k͡p	ʔ
Plosive	voiced	b	d		ɡ	ɡ͡b	
Plosive	prenasalized	ᵐb	ⁿd		ᵑɡ	ᵑɡ͡b	
Plosive	implosive	ɓ	ɗ				
Fricative	plain	ɸ	s				h
Fricative	voiced	β					
Affricate	voiced		d͡z ~ d͡ʒ				
Affricate	prenasalized		ⁿd͡z ~ ⁿd͡ʒ				
Lateral			l				
Nasal		m	n	ɲ			
Semivowel				j		w	

/d͡z/ can also be heard as post-alveolar [d͡ʒ], among different dialects.

=== Vowels ===
	Front	Back
Close	i	u
Close-mid	e	o
Open-mid	ɛ	ɔ
Open	a	

== Orthography ==
Baka does not have a standard orthography, and there are many different ways to write it. The following is a 2009 recommendation which is supported by the Ministry of Scientific Research and Innovation. It is based on the General Alphabet of Cameroon Languages.

Baka alphabet (2009)
A	B	Ɓ	D	Ɗ	E	Ɛ	G	GB	H	I	J	K	KP	L	M	MB	N	ND	NG	NGB	NJ	NY	O	Ɔ	P	S	T	U	W	Y	ʼ
a	b	ɓ	d	ɗ	e	ɛ	g	gb	h	i	j	k	kp	l	m	mb	n	nd	ng	ngb	nj	ny	o	ɔ	p	s	t	u	w	y	ʼ
Pronunciation
/a/	/b/	/ɓ/	/d/	/ɗ/	/e/	/ɛ/	/ɡ/	/ɡ͡b/	/h/	/i/	/d͡ʒ/	/k/	/k͡p/	/l/	/m/	/ᵐb/	/n/	/ⁿd/	/ŋ/	/ᵑɡ͡b/	/ⁿd͡ʒ/	/ɲ/	/o/	/ɔ/	/p/	/s/	/t/	/u/	/w/	/j/	/ʔ/

Tones are indicated by diacritics: the acute for high tone (á é ɛ́ í ó ɔ́ ú), and the grave for low tone (à è ɛ̀ ì ò ɔ̀ ù), middle tone is not indicated)

Brisson uses a noticeably different orthography in his dictionaries. He noticeably uses the glottal stop (ʔ) instead of the apostrophe.
