= Fang language =

Bantu language of Equatorial Guinea, northwest Gabon and neighbouring areas

Fang
- Pangwe
- Faŋ, Paŋwe
- Native to: Equatorial Guinea, Gabon, Republic of the Congo, Cameroon, and São Tomé and Príncipe
- Ethnicity: Fang
- Native speakers: 1 million (2006–2013)
- Language family: Niger–Congo?: Atlantic–Congo; Volta-Congo; Benue–Congo; Bantoid; Southern Bantoid; Bantu (Zone A); Beti; Fang
- Dialects: Ntumu-Fang; Okak-Fang; Mekê-Fang; Mvaï(mveny)-Fang; Atsi-Fang; Nzaman-Fang

Language codes
- ISO 639-2: fan
- ISO 639-3: fan
- Glottolog: fang1246
- Guthrie code: A.75,751
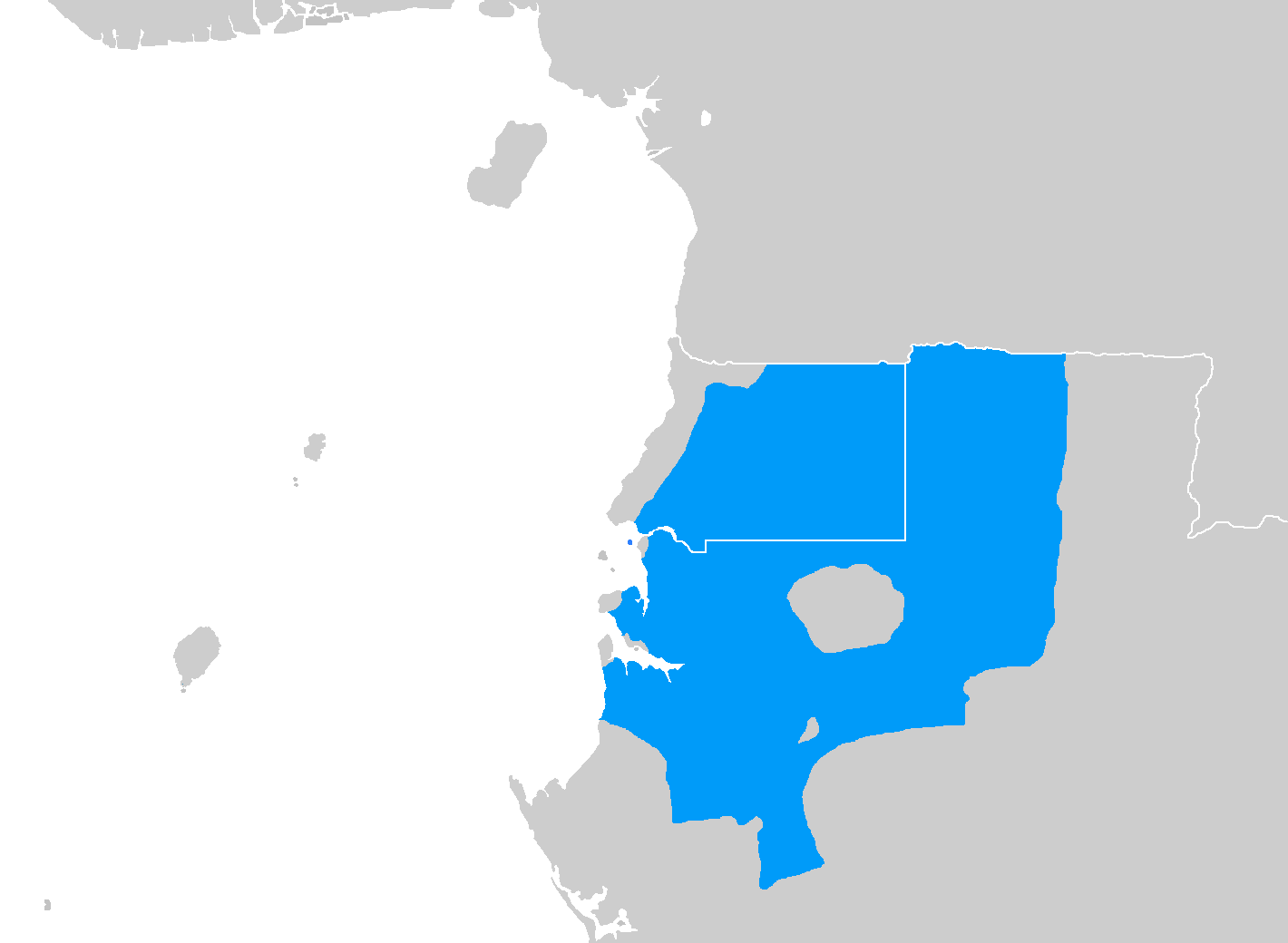
- Distribution of the Fang language

Fang (/ˈfɒŋ/) is a Central African language spoken by around one million people, most of them in Equatorial Guinea and northern Gabon, where it is the dominant Bantu language; Fang is also spoken in southern Cameroon, the Republic of the Congo, and small fractions of the islands of São Tomé and Príncipe. It is related to the Bulu and Ewondo languages of southern Cameroon.

Between 1970 and 1979, Fang replaced Spanish as the main language of the administration of Equatorial Guinea under the government of Macías Nguema, although it never became official and was imposed during his term, as an attempt to "Africanize" the country.

There are many different variants of Fang in northern Gabon and southern Cameroon. Maho (2009) lists Southwest Fang as a distinct language. The other dialects are Ntumu, Okak, Mekê, Atsi (Batsi), Nzaman and Mveny (Mvaïe).

== Distribution ==
According to ALCAM (2012), Fang is mainly spoken in northern Gabon and also Equatorial Guinea. Dialects include Ntumu, Mvany, and Okak. In Cameroon, Fang is spoken in the southern half of Dja-et-Lobo department (Southern Region) south of Djoum. It is also spoken in the southeast of Mvila department: south of Mvangan, plus small isolated parts of Océan department between Lolodorf and Kribi where the Okak dialect is spoken. The other dialects, Mvany and Ntumu, are spoken in Vallée-du-Ntem department.

== Corpus and lexicology ==
Despite Fang's lack of any well-defined literary corpus, linguists have attempted to compile dictionaries and lexicons for it. The two most notable projects were by Maillard (2007) (Note: Ella, Edgar Maillard (2007-03). A Theoretical Model For a Fang-French-English Specialized Multi-Volume School Dictionary.) and Bibang (2014). Neither created a direct Fang-English dictionary, but opted instead to separate the two languages via third European languages (French and Spanish, respectively) as a bridge for various loanwords.

The translation efforts to English have been done through Romance languages: specifically, Spanish and French. French would likely have had the most impact on the language, given the occupation of Gabon by the French during the existence of French Equatorial Africa (itself part of French West Africa), which lasted 75 years from 1885 to 1960. To a lesser extent, in São Tomé and Príncipe, Portuguese also likely influenced the dialects of Fang, as it was ruled by Portugal for most of its history.

== Phonology ==
The phonology of Fang is listed below. (Note: Bibang Oyee, Julián-Bibang (2014). Diccionario Español-Fang/Fang-Español. Akal.)

=== Consonants ===
In Fang, there are 24 plain consonants. The majority of them can become prenasalized:

		Labial	Alveolar	Alveopalatal	Velar	Labial–velar	Glottal
Nasal		m	n	ɲ	ŋ		
Plosive	plain	p b	t d		k ɡ	k͡p ɡ͡b	ʔ
Plosive	prenasal	ᵐp ᵐb	ⁿt ⁿd		ᵑk ᵑg	ᵑk͡p ᵑɡ͡b	
Affricate	plain		t͡s d͡z				
Affricate	prenasal		ⁿt͡s ⁿd͡z				
Fricative	plain	f v	s z				h
Fricative	prenasal	ᶬf ᶬv	ⁿs ⁿz				
Approximant	plain		l	j		w	
Approximant	prenasal			ᶮj		ⁿw	
Tap			ɾ				

/h/ is only used in interjections and loanwords. Words can not start with /ŋ/, except when followed by a velar consonant. /ɾ/ and /z/ also are restricted from word-initial position. /g/ and /p/ can only come in word-initial position in words of foreign origin, although in many of these cases, /g/ becomes realized as [ŋg].

The morpheme "gh" is pronounced as ɾ in the case of the word "Beyoghe" (the Fang term for Libreville); one of several changes to pronunciation by morphology.

It is also important to note that in Fang, at every "hiatus" (shock of two vowels), such as in "Ma adzi", it is required for one to make the second word an aphetic, dropping the pronunciation of the aː sound at the start of the second word (e.g. "Ma dzi").

=== Vowels ===
Fang has seven vowels, each of which can have short or long realizations.

Vowel Phonemes
	Front (short/long)	Back (short/long)
Close	i iː (ĩ)	u uː (ũ)
Close-mid	e eː (ẽ)	o oː (õ)
Open-mid	ɛ ɛː (ɛ̃)	ɔ ɔː (ɔ̃)
Open	a aː (ã)	

Nasal vowels are allophones of the respective oral vowels, when followed by a nasal consonant [ŋ] or [ɲ]. Words cannot start with [ɛ], [i], [ɔ] or [u].

==== Diphthongs ====
Diphthongs can be a combination of any vowel with [j] or [w], as well as [ea], [oe], [oa], [ua].

=== Tone ===
Fang distinguishes between at least five lexical tones, conventionally called: high, mid, low, rising and falling. One vowel in a sequences of vowels can be elided in casual speech, though its tone remains and attaches to the remaining vowel. (Note: Bibang Oyee, Julián (1990). Curso de lengua fang. Centro Cultural Hispano-Guineano)

== Orthography ==
Fang does not have a standardized orthography. In Cameroon, Fang is usually written using the General Alphabet of Cameroon Languages or in Bulu orthography as Bulu is mutually intelligible with Fang. In Gabon and Equatorial Guinea, it depends on the individual writer.

The most common letters used to write the Fang language in Equatorial Guinea and Gabon are:

IPA	Gabon	Equatorial Guinea
a	A	A
b,ɡ͡b	B	B
t͡s	Ts	Ch
d	D	D
d͡z	Dz,dj	Dj
e	É	E
ɛ	È	E
f	F	F
ɡ	G	G
i	I	I
k	K	K
l	L	L
m	M	M
n	N	N
ɲ	Gn,ny	Ñ,gn
ŋ	Ng,n	Ng,n
o	Ô	O
ɔ	O	O
p,k͡p	P	P
ɾ	R	R
s	S	S
t	T	T
u	U	U
v	V	V
w	W	W
j	Y	Y
z	Z	Z
ʔ	Gh,kh	G,k

== See also ==
- Beti-Pahuin
