= Makaa language =

Bantu language spoken in Cameroonn

Makaa
- Native to: Cameroon
- Ethnicity: Makaa
- Native speakers: (80,000 cited 1987)
- Language family: Niger–Congo?: Atlantic–Congo; Benue–Congo; Bantu (Zone A); Makaa–Njem + Kako (A.80–90); Ndzem–Bomwali; Makaa languages; Makaa
- Dialects: Bebend; Mbwaanz; Sekunda

Language codes
- ISO 639-3: mcp
- Glottolog: maka1304
- Guthrie code: A.83

Makaa (Maka), or South Makaa, is a Bantu language of Cameroon. It is not intelligible with the other language spoken by the Makaa people, North Makaa.

== Varieties ==
The central part of the Meka area consists of the three central dialects Bésáp, Bébánde and Mbwas. Byáp in the north and Békol in the south are more geographically peripheral dialects. Byáp and Asón should not be confused with Northern Maka.

Meka covers essentially the entire northern part of Haut-Nyong department (Eastern Region). Bébánde covers the entire northern part of Abong-Mbang commune and also Bebeng commune. Mbwas covers most of the Doumé area (Mbouang and Doumatang communes), and Bésáp covers the north of Nguélémendouka.

Byap occupies the eastern part of Diang commune and Bélabo commune (Lom-et-Djerem department, Eastern Region), west of Bertoua. It extends into the Central and Southern Regions in Nyong-et-Mfoumou (in Akonolinga and Endom communes) and Dja-et-Lobo (in Bengbis and Zoétélé communes) departments.

There are 89,500 speakers.

== Phonology ==
=== Consonants ===
		Labial	Alveolar	Palatal	Velar	Labial- velar	Glottal
Plosive	voiceless		t	c	k	kp	
Plosive	voiced	b	d	ɟ	ɡ		
Plosive	prenasal vl.	ᵐp	ⁿt	ᶮc	ᵑk		
Plosive	prenasal vd.	ᵐb	ⁿd	ᶮɟ	ᵑɡ		
Nasal		m	n	ɲ	ŋ		
Fricative	voiceless	f	s	ʃ			h
Fricative	voiced	v	z	ʒ			
Lateral			l				
Approximant				j		w	

=== Vowels ===
	Front	Central	Back
Close	i	ɨ	u
Near-close	ɪ		
Close-mid	e	ə	o, õ
Open-mid	ɛ, ɛ̃	ə	o, õ
Open		a	

- /o, õ/ may have allophones [ɔ, ɔ̃] which occur in free variation in many environments.

== Writing system ==
Maka alphabet
a	b	c	d	e	ɛ	ə	f	g	h	i	ɨ	j	k	l	m
n	ny	ŋ	o	p	s	sh	t	u	ʉ	v	w	y	z	zh	

Nasal vowels are indicated using the cedilla ‹ ɛ̧, ɔ̧ ›. Tones are indicated using diacritics:

- the high tone with an acute accent;
- the descending high-low tone with a circumflex accent;
- the low-high rising tone with a caron;
- low tone without accent.
