= Mekin Hydroelectric Power Station =

Power station in Cameroon

- Map of Cameroon showing the location of Mekin HPP.
- Country: Cameroon
- Location: Mekin, Dja and Lobo Department, South Region (Cameroon)
- Coordinates: 03°15′34″N 12°25′17″E
- Purpose: Power
- Status: Under construction
- Construction cost: €52.5 million

Dam and spillways
- Impounds: Dja River

Reservoir
- Normal elevation: 611 m (2,005 ft)

Power Station
- Operator: HydroMekin
- Commission date: Q4 2022 Expected
- Turbines: 4 x 3.75 MW
- Installed capacity: 15 MW (20,000 hp)
- Annual generation: ~100 GWh

The Mekin Hydroelectric Power Station, also referred to as Mekin Power Station, is a 15 MW (20,000 hp) hydroelectric power station, in Cameroon. This power station has been under construction since early 2010s, with initial commissioning planned for 2015. However, the project has been beset by multiple delays, plant shutdowns and restarts. The power station was partially re-started in June 2022 to allow the generation and evacuation of 11.25 MW of electricity, comprising 75 percent of maximum capacity. When current production testing is concluded, it is expected that the final unit will be brought online during the fourth quarter of 2022.

This renewable energy infrastructure project is under development by Mekin Hydroelectric Development Corporation (Hydro Mekin also HydroMekin), a Cameroonian independent power producer (IPP). The energy off-taker is ENEO Cameroon S.A., the public-private partnership electricity utility company. The electricity is intended for distribution primarily, in the Dja and Lobo Department of the South Region of Cameroon, where the power station is located.

== Location ==
The power station straddles the Dja River, immediately downstream of its confluence with the Lobo River, in Mekin Village, in the Dja and Lobo Department of the South Region of Cameroon. Mekin is located approximately 75 kilometres (47 mi), northeast of the town of Sangmélima, the departmental headquarters. This is approximately 194 kilometres (121 mi) southeast of Yaoundé, the capital city of Cameroon. The geographical coordinates of Mekin Hydroelectric Power Station are:3°15'34.0"N, 12°25'17.0"E (Latitude:3.259444; Longitude:12.421389).

== Overview ==
The design calls for a rock-fill dam with four generation turbines, each rated at 3.75 MW for total generation capacity of 15 MW. The energy leaves the generation turbines at 63kV. At the substation outside the power station, the energy is stepped up to 110kV. It is then transmitted via overhead high voltage transmission cables to an ENEO substation at Ndjom Yekomo. There the energy is stepped down to 30kV and then entered into the ENEO grid for distribution.

== Construction and funding ==
The engineering, procurement and construction (EPC) contractor is China National Electric Engineering Company (CNEEC). The initial budget was CFA 25 billion(approx. €40 million), with Exim Bank of China lending 85 percent and the government of Cameroon contributing 15 percent. As of June 2022, with multiple cost overruns, at least €52.5 million has been spent on construction.

== See also ==
- List of power stations in Cameroon
