= Mvila =

- Department
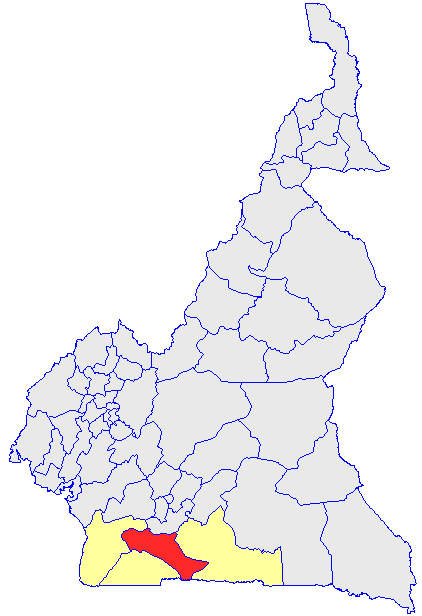
- Department location in Cameroon
- Coordinates: 2.8541°N 11.4491°E
- Country: Cameroon
- Province: South Province
- Capital: Ebolowa

Area
  - Total: 8,697 km^{2} (3,358 sq mi)

Population (2005)
  - Total: 179,429
  - Density: 20.63/km^{2} (53.43/sq mi)
- Time zone: UTC+1 (WAT)

Mvila is a department of South Province in Cameroon. The department covers an area of 8697 km^{2} and as of 2005 had a total population of 179,429. The capital of the department lies at Ebolowa.

== Subdivisions ==
The department is divided administratively into 8 communes and in turn into villages.

=== Communes ===
- Biwong-Bane
- Biwong-Bulu
- Ebolowa (urban)
- Ebolowa (rural)
- Efoulan
- Mengong
- Mvangane
- Ngoulemakong
