= Jean-Baptiste Bokam =

Cameroonian politician (1951–2024)

Minister of Public Works
- In office 9 April 1992 – 7 December 1997
- Preceded by: Paul Tessa
- Succeeded by: Jérôme Obi Eta

Minister of Labor and Social Welfare
- In office 16 May 1988 – 9 April 1992

Personal details
- Born: 10 October 1951 Bagbeze I, Haut-Nyong, French Cameroon
- Died: 16 January 2024 (aged 72) Yaoundé, Cameroon
- Party: CPDM
- Education: University of Yaoundé

Jean-Baptiste Bokam (10 October 1951 – 16 January 2024) was a Cameroonian politician of the Cameroon People's Democratic Movement (RDPC).

== Biography ==
Born in Bagbeze I on 10 October 1951, Bokam attended primary school in Esseng I and secondary school in Doumé. He graduated from the University of Yaoundé in 1976 with a degree in economic sciences.

In 1976, Bokam was recruited by the National Social Insurance Fund as an executive assistant. He entered the Cameroonian government in 1988, having been appointed Minister of Labor and Social Welfare, a position he held from 1988 to 1992. He was then Minister of Public Works from 9 April 1992 to 7 December 1997 before he was succeeded by Jérôme Obi Eta. In 2011, he was appointed Secretary of State for Veterans and War Victims. In 2015, he was appointed Secretary of State for the National Gendarmerie. In 2018, he was replaced by Gallas Yves Landry Etoga.

Bokam also became President of the Banque internationale du Cameroun pour l'épargne et le crédit in 1990. An activist for the RDPC, he helped manage national elections.

Jean-Baptiste Bokam died following a long illness at the University Teaching Hospital of Yaounde, on 16 January 2024, at the age of 72.
