= Biwong-Bulu =

- Commune and town
- Location in Cameroon
- Coordinates: 3.1333°N 11.1500°E
- Country: Cameroon
- Region: South
- Department: Mvila

Area
  - Total: 558.06 sq mi (1,445.37 km^{2})

Population
  - Total: 34,374
  - Density: 61.6/sq mi (23.78/km^{2})
- Time zone: UTC+1 (WAT)

Biwong-Bulu is a town and commune in the Mvila department of the South Region of Cameroon.

== Name ==
The name Biwong-Bulu is derived from "Bulu", the name of the main ethnic group of the area, and "Biwong", the Bulu phrase "to gather something rare".

== History ==
The Biwong-Bulu commune was created from the splitting of the former Ebolowa Rural Commune by presidential decree on April 24, 2007.

== Geography ==
Biwong-Bulu has an area of 1,445.37 km^{2} (558.06 sq mi). The terrain is largely flat, with plains and plateaus and a few hills.

== Demographics ==
The commune is home to 34,374 inhabitants, resulting in a population density of 23.78 inhabitants per square kilometer (61.6/sq mi).

== Climate ==
Biwong-Bulu has a tropical climate. Rainfall is usually between 1,200–2,000 mm (47–79 in) per year. The temperature is warm year-round, hovering around 22–26 °C (72–79 °F).

== See also ==
- Communes of Cameroon
