= Bulu language =

Bantu language spoken in Cameroon

Bulu
- Bulu-Bene
- Bulu (Nkobô Bulu)
- Region: Cameroon
- Ethnicity: Bulu people
- Native speakers: 860,000 (2007)
- Language family: Niger–Congo?: Atlantic–Congo; Volta-Congo; Benue–Congo; Bantoid; Southern Bantoid; Bantu (Zone A); Beti; Bulu
- Dialects: Bulu; Bene

Language codes
- ISO 639-3: bum
- Glottolog: bulu1251
- Guthrie code: A.74

Bulu is a Bantu language of the Bulu people of Cameroon. The language had 174,000 native speakers in 1982, with some 800,000 second language speakers in 1991. Its dialects include Bene, Yelinda, Yembana, Yengono, and Zaman. Bulu was formerly used by colonial and missionary groups as a lingua franca in the region for commercial, educational, and religious purposes, though it is today becoming less frequent in those spheres.

Bulu belongs to the group of Beti languages and is intelligible with Eton, Ewondo, and Fang.

== Distribution ==
Bulu speakers are concentrated primarily in Cameroon's South Province, with the largest number at Ebolowa and Sangmélima. Some speakers live in the Nyong-et-Mfoumou division of the Centre and the Haut-Nyong division of the East.

According to ALCAM (2012), Bulu is spoken in the departments of Mvila and Dja-et-Lobo (Southern Region), and also the south of the department of Haute-Sanaga (Central Region) where the Yezum dialect of Ewondo is also spoken. Along with the Yébékóló and Omvan languages, it is also spoken in the north of Nyong-et-Mfoumou department (Central Region) and part of Haut-Nyong department (south of Nguelemendouka commune, Eastern Region).

== Phonology ==
Here is the phonological inventory of Bulu.

=== Consonants ===
		Labial	Alveolar	Palatal	Velar		Glottal
		Labial	Alveolar	Palatal	plain	lab.	Glottal
Plosive	voiceless	p	t		k		
Plosive	voiced	b	d		ɡ		
Plosive	prenasalized	ᵐb	ⁿd		ᵑɡ		
Affricate	voiceless			tʃ	kp	kpʷ	
Affricate	voiced			dʒ	ɡb	ɡbʷ	
Affricate	prenasalized voiceless				ᵑkp	ᵑkpʷ	
Affricate	prenasalied voiced				ᵑɡb	ᵑɡbʷ	
Fricative	voiceless	f	s				h
Fricative	voiced	v	z				
Fricative	prenasalized	ᶬv					
Nasal		m	n	ɲ	ŋ		
Lateral			l				
Approximant				j		w	

=== Vowels/Nasals ===
	Front	Central	Back
Close	i ĩ		u ũ
Close-mid	e ẽ		o
Mid		ə	
Open-mid	ɛ		ɔ ɔ̃
Open		a ã	

== Writing system ==
The Bulu language was codified by the first Presbyterian missionaries who arrived in Cameroon. They made it a language of instruction in Protestant doctrine during the colonial era. This language has a dictionary (French-Bulu/Bulu-French) one of whose authors is Moïse Eyinga. The first novel written in Bulu is Nnanga Kôn.

=== EPC Alphabet ===
The Bulu alphabet of the Presbyterian Church of Cameroon consists of 24 letters: a, b, d, e, f, g, h, i, j, k, l, m, n, ñ, o, ô, p, s, t, u, v, w, y, z. é and è are variants of e in this alphabet.

=== PROPELCA alphabet ===
PROPELCA has also coded Bulu with an alphabet based on the General Alphabet of Cameroonian Languages.

Alphabet (PROPELCA)
Uppercase	A	B	C	D	E	Ə	F	I	J	K	L	M	N	Ŋ	NY	O	Ɔ	S	T	U	V	Y	Z	ʼ
Lowercase	a	b	c	d	e	ə	f	i	j	k	l	m	n	ŋ	ny	o	ɔ	s	t	u	v	y	z	ʼ
