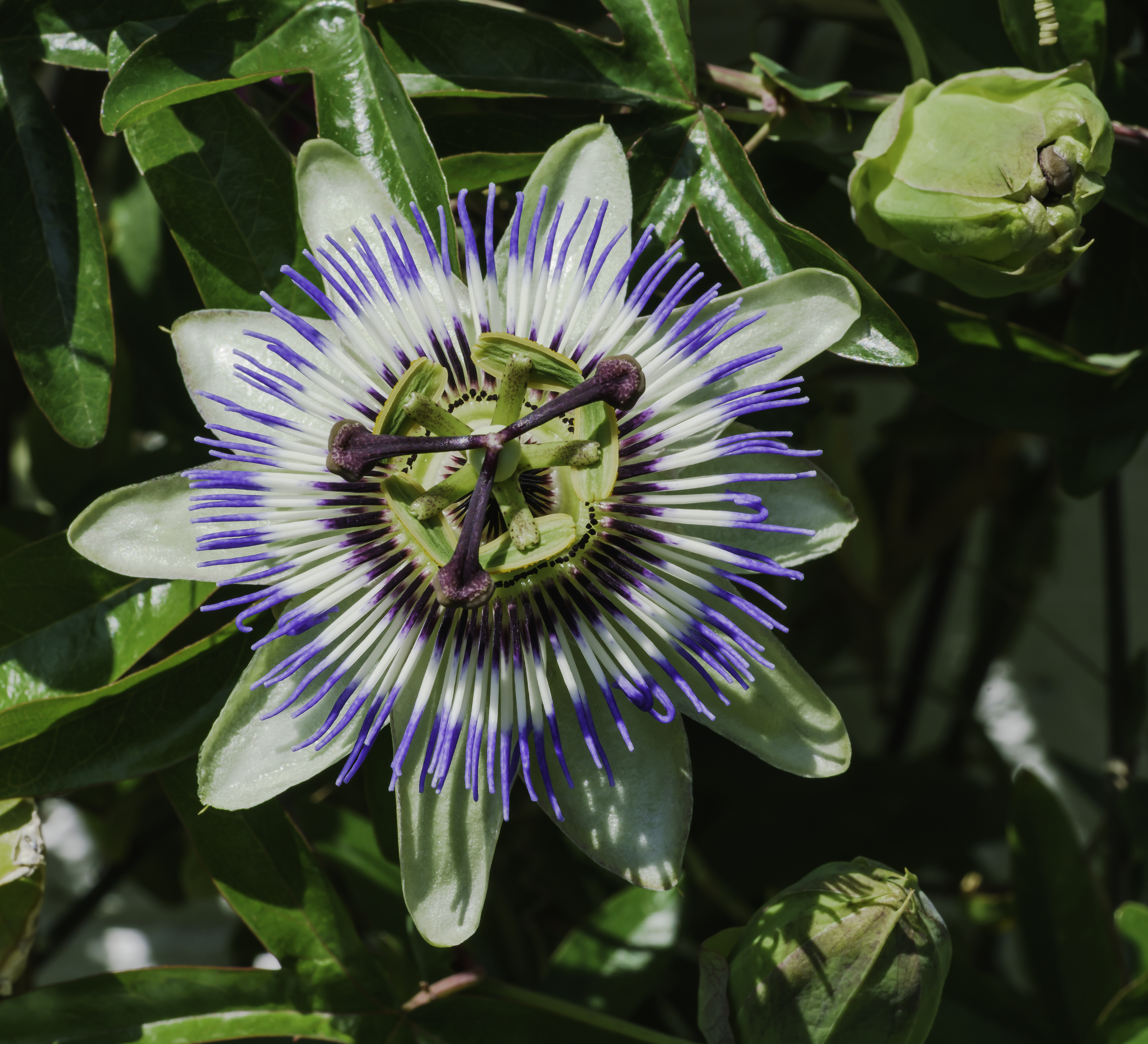

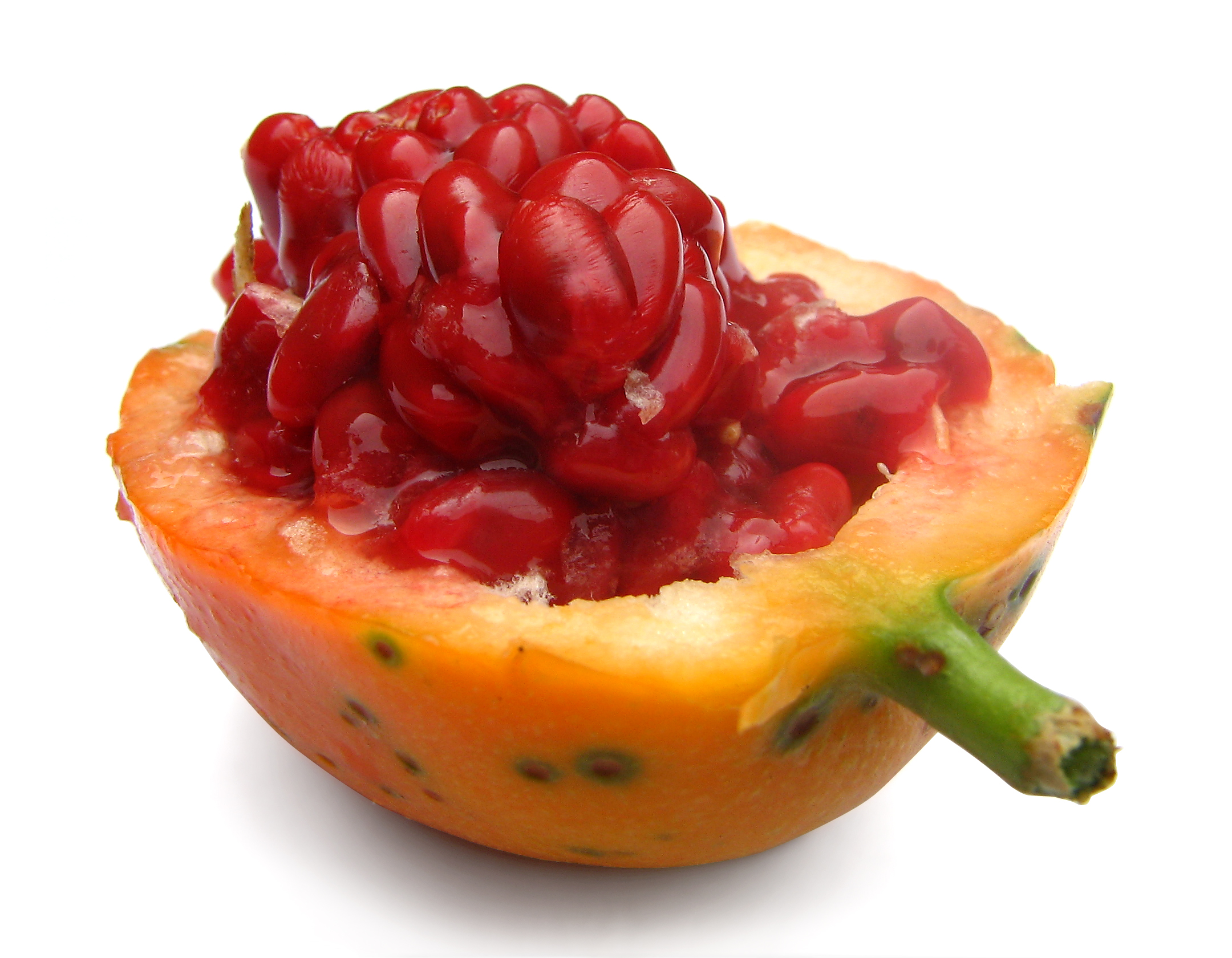
- Fruit cut and opened

Scientific classification
- Kingdom: Plantae
- Clade: Tracheophytes
- Clade: Angiosperms
- Clade: Eudicots
- Clade: Rosids
- Order: Malpighiales
- Family: Passifloraceae
- Genus: Passiflora
- Species: P. caerulea

Binomial name
- Passiflora caerulea L.

= Passiflora caerulea =

Species of flowering plant in the passion flower family

Passiflora caerulea, the blue passionflower, bluecrown passionflower or common passion flower, is a species of flowering plant in the family Passifloraceae. It is native to South America and has been introduced elsewhere.

It forms a vigorous, deciduous or semi-evergreen tendril-bearing vine growing to 10 m (33 ft) or more. Its leaves are palmately lobed, and its fragrant flowers are blue-white with a prominent fringe of coronal filaments in bands of blue, white, yellow, and brown. The ovoid orange fruit grows to 6 cm (2 in) across.

The fruit is edible, but is sometimes described as having an unpalatable or unpleasant flavour. In South America, the plant is known for its medicinal properties, and is used by both the Toba and the Maka peoples.

== Description ==
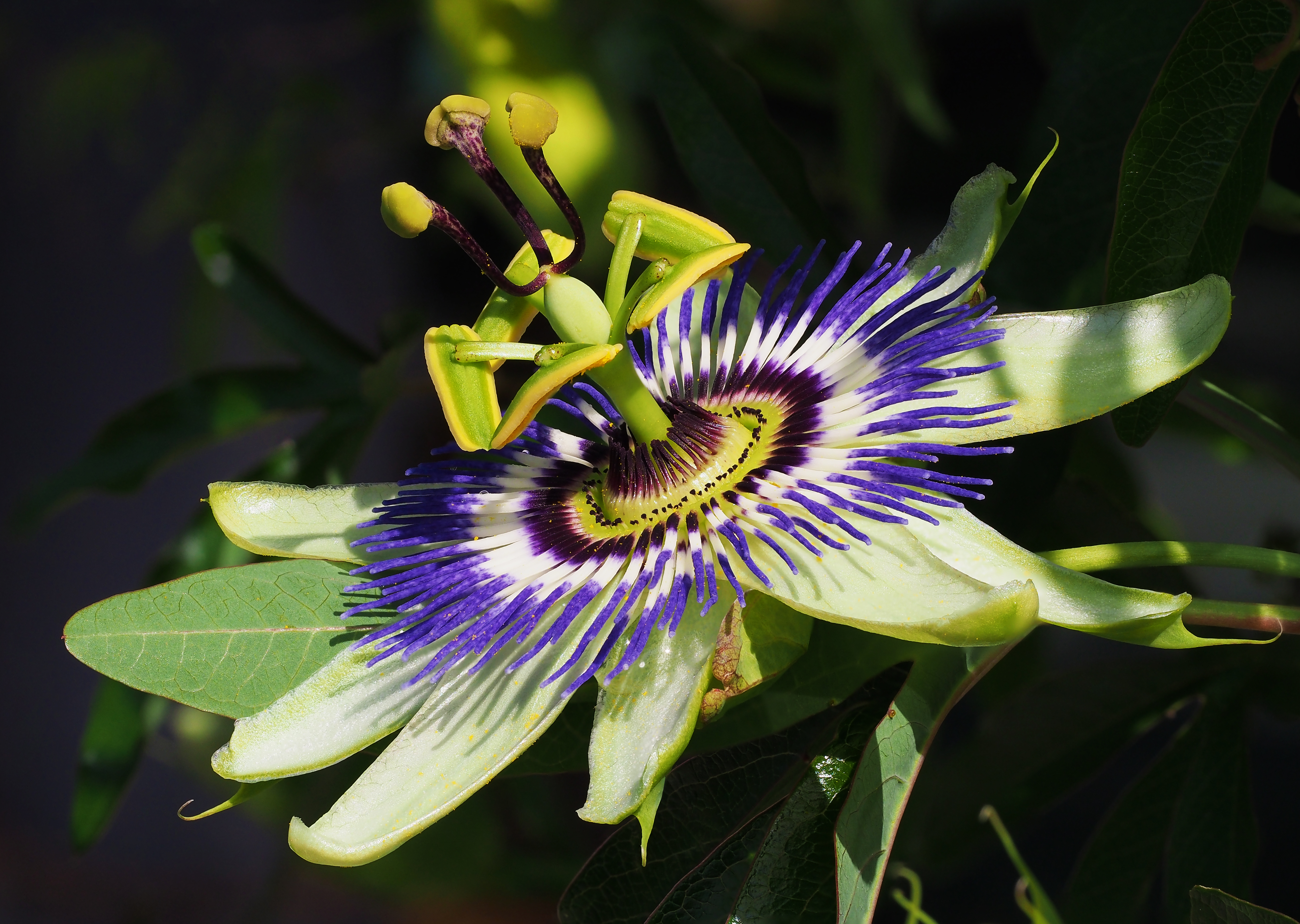
Passiflora caerulea flower

Passiflora caerulea is a woody vine capable of growing to 25 metres (82 ft) high where supporting trees are available. The leaves are alternate, palmately five-lobed (sometimes three, seven, or nine lobes), and are up to 10 centimetres (4 in) in length while being linear-oblong shaped. The base of each leaf has a flagellate-twining tendril 5–10 cm (2–4 in) long, which twines around supporting vegetation to hold the plant up.

The flower is complex, about 10 cm (4 in) in diameter, with the five sepals and petals similar in appearance, whitish in colour, surmounted by a corona of blue or violet filaments, then five greenish-yellow stamens and three purple stigmas. The fruit is an oval orange-yellow berry, 6 cm (2 1/4 in) long by 4 cm (1 1/2 in) in diameter, containing an average of 10 to 35 seeds.

While commonly used as an ornamental vine in tropical landscaping, it is an invasive, noxious weed that can take over native wildlife. Plants sometimes send underground shoots up to 15 feet from the mother plant.

=== Chemical constituents ===
Compared to P. incarnata, this plant contains higher amounts of the MAO-inhibitor harmine.

== Etymology ==
The specific epithet caerulea means "blue" and refers to the blue coronal filaments.

== Cultivation ==
Passiflora caerulea is widely cultivated as a wall-climber or as groundcover. It is a hardy species, able to survive winter temperatures as low as −10 °C (14 °F), although it requires a sheltered position facing south or west (in the Northern Hemisphere). It can become invasive, the twining shoots constantly appearing unless eradicated. It is the only Passiflora species that volunteers in California. It has gained the Royal Horticultural Society's Award of Garden Merit.

=== Cultivars ===
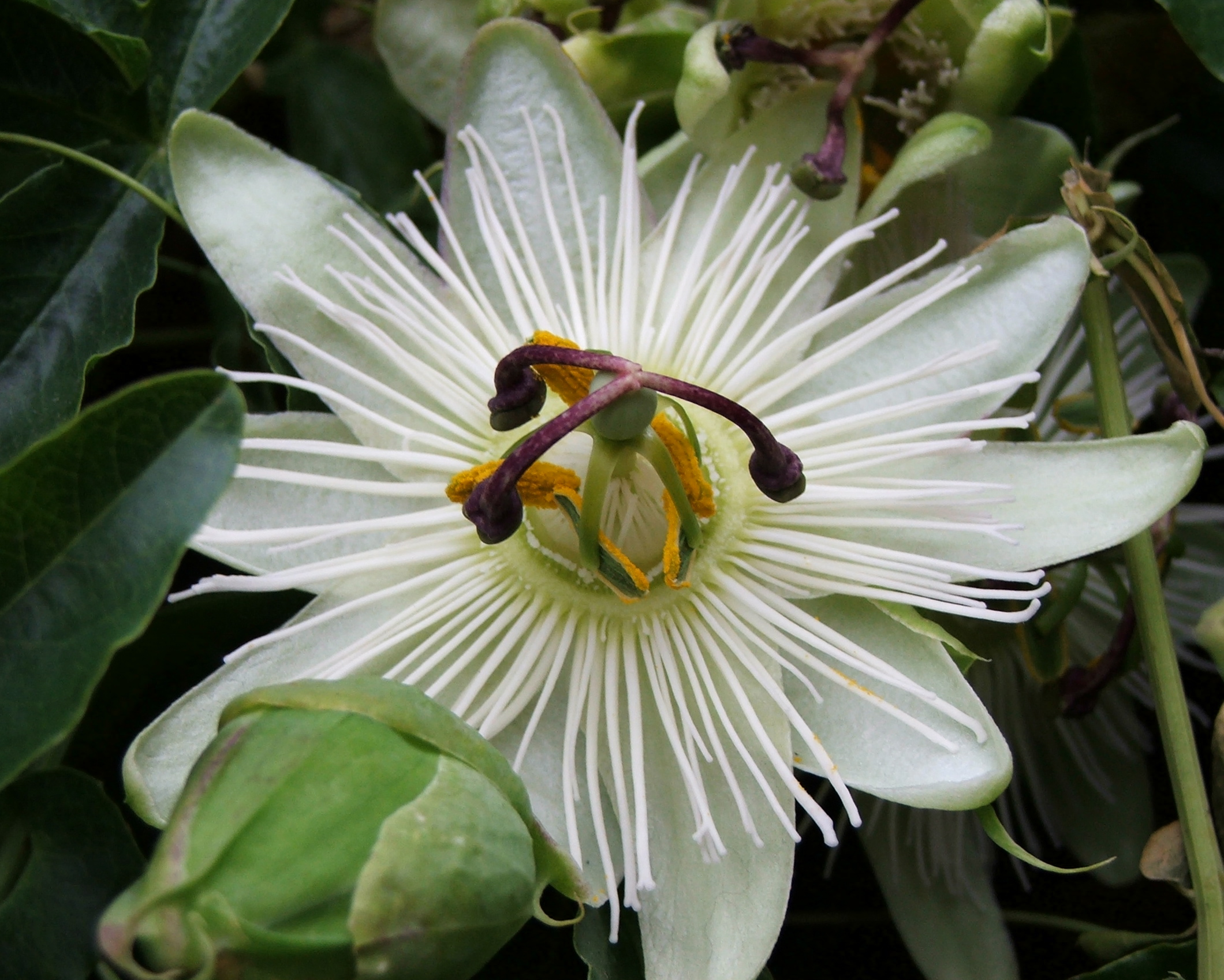
White-flowered cultivar P. caerulea 'Constance Elliott'

A number of cultivars have been produced from the species:

- 'Chinensis' (corona filaments paler blue)
- 'Constance Elliott' was raised by Lucombe, Pince & Co in Exeter, Great Britain in 1884. It has pure white, fragrant flowers; not as free-flowering as many other clones. It has also won the Award of Garden Merit from the Royal Horticultural Society.
- 'Pierre Pomie', a pale pink flower form

== Uses ==
The fruit is edible to humans when ripe, but its flavour has been described as bland, undesirable or insipid. If allowed to fully ripen in a warm climate and fall naturally from the vine, it has a mild blackberry flavour, though with a lower sugar content than commonly eaten species.

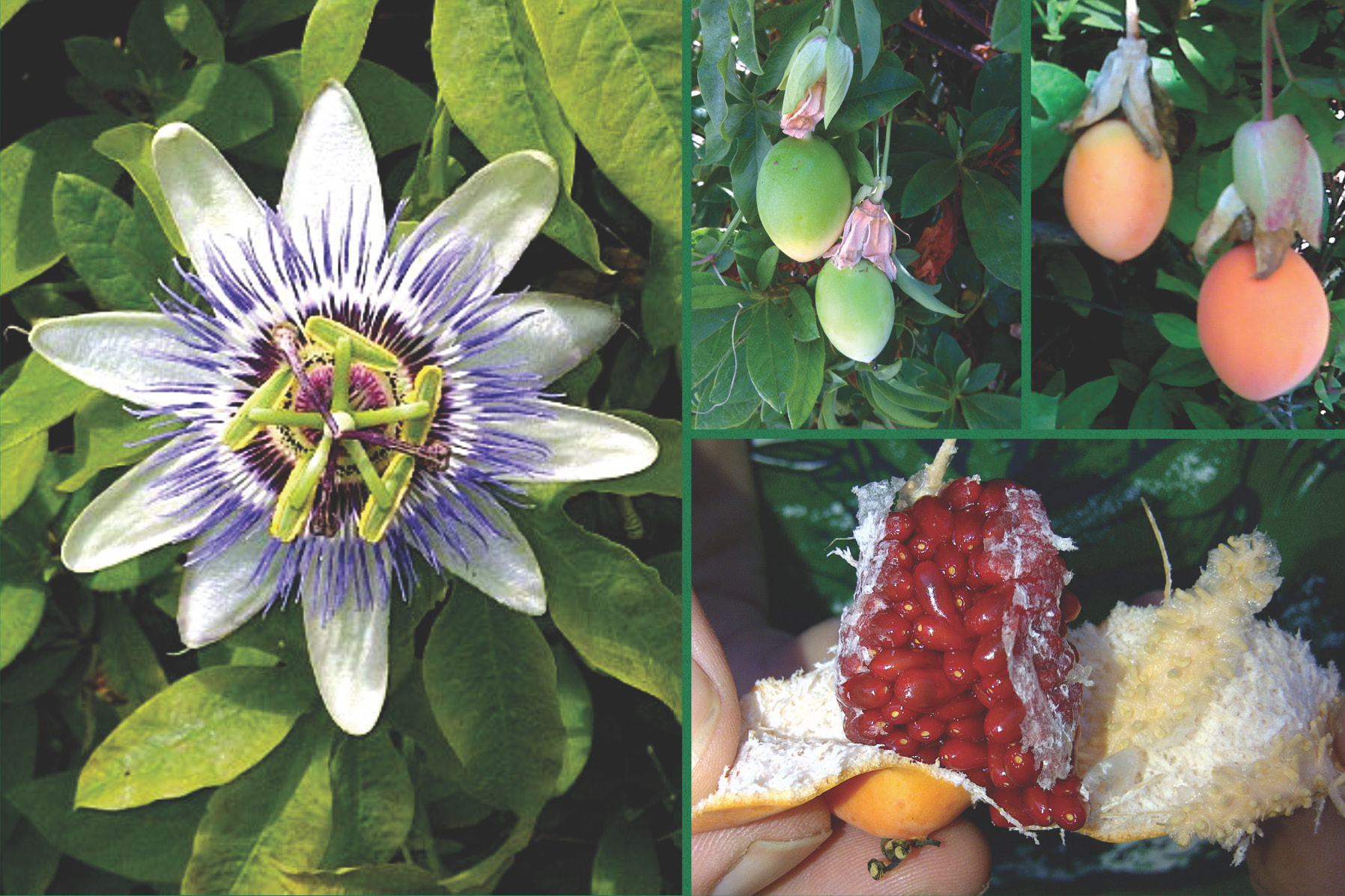
P. caerulea flower and fruit

A tea can be made of the flower or leaves; but the leaves contain tetraphyllin B and epi-tetraphyllin B, cyanogenic glycosides that liberate hydrogen cyanide when activated by enzymes. It is possible to boil away most of the cyanide.

In South America, the plant is known for its medicinal uses. It is used in both tisanes (herbal tea) and dietary supplements, as well as in marmalades, ice creams, syrups and beverages. It is also used by the indigenous Argentine Toba and Maka people.

Passiflora caerulea is often used as a rootstock, to which is grafted a scion of the edible P. edulis.

== In culture ==
Passiflora caerulea is the national flower of Paraguay. Its intricate structure has generated Christian symbolism, each part representing a different part of the Passion of Christ.

== Gallery ==
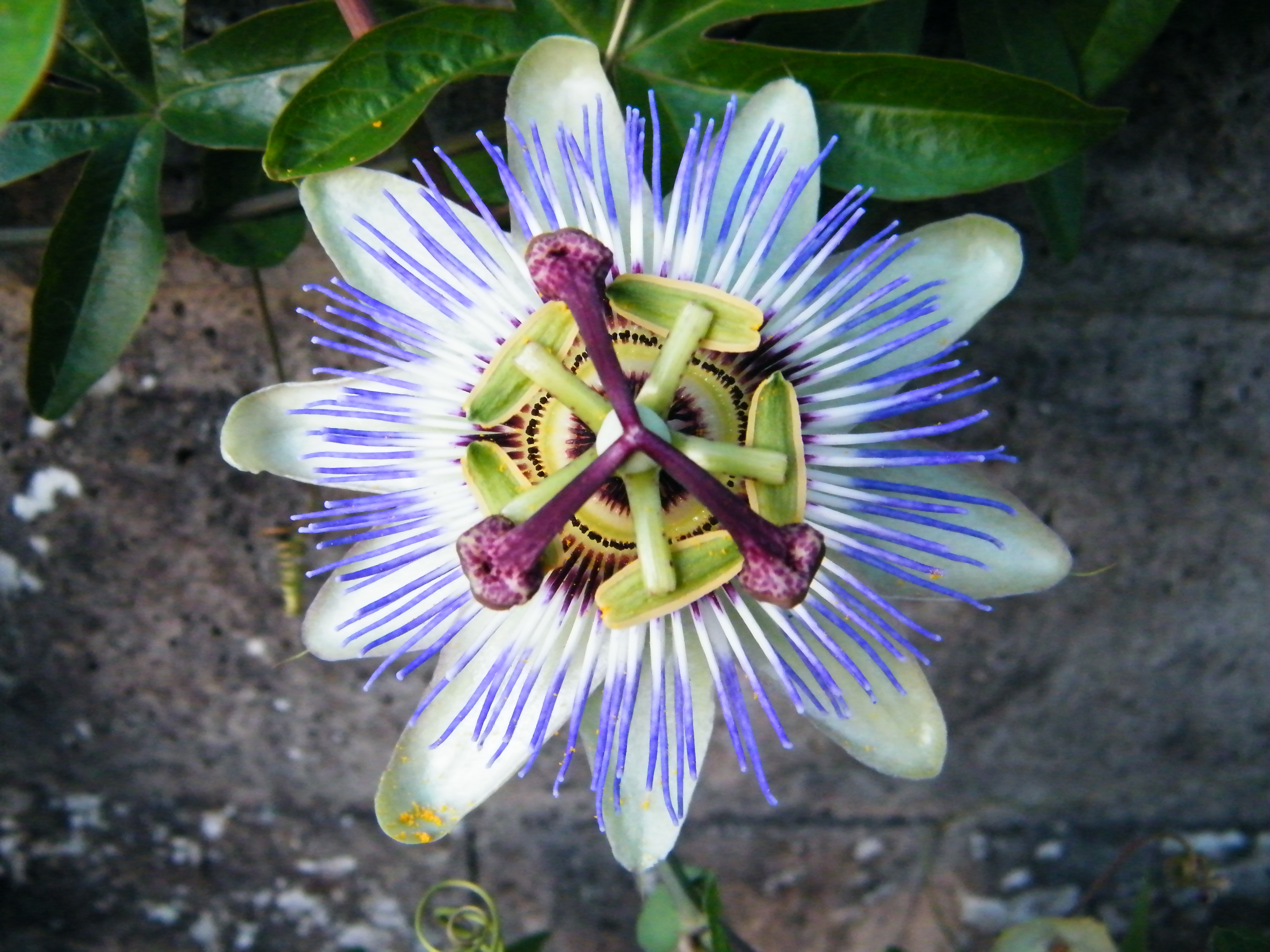
Flower

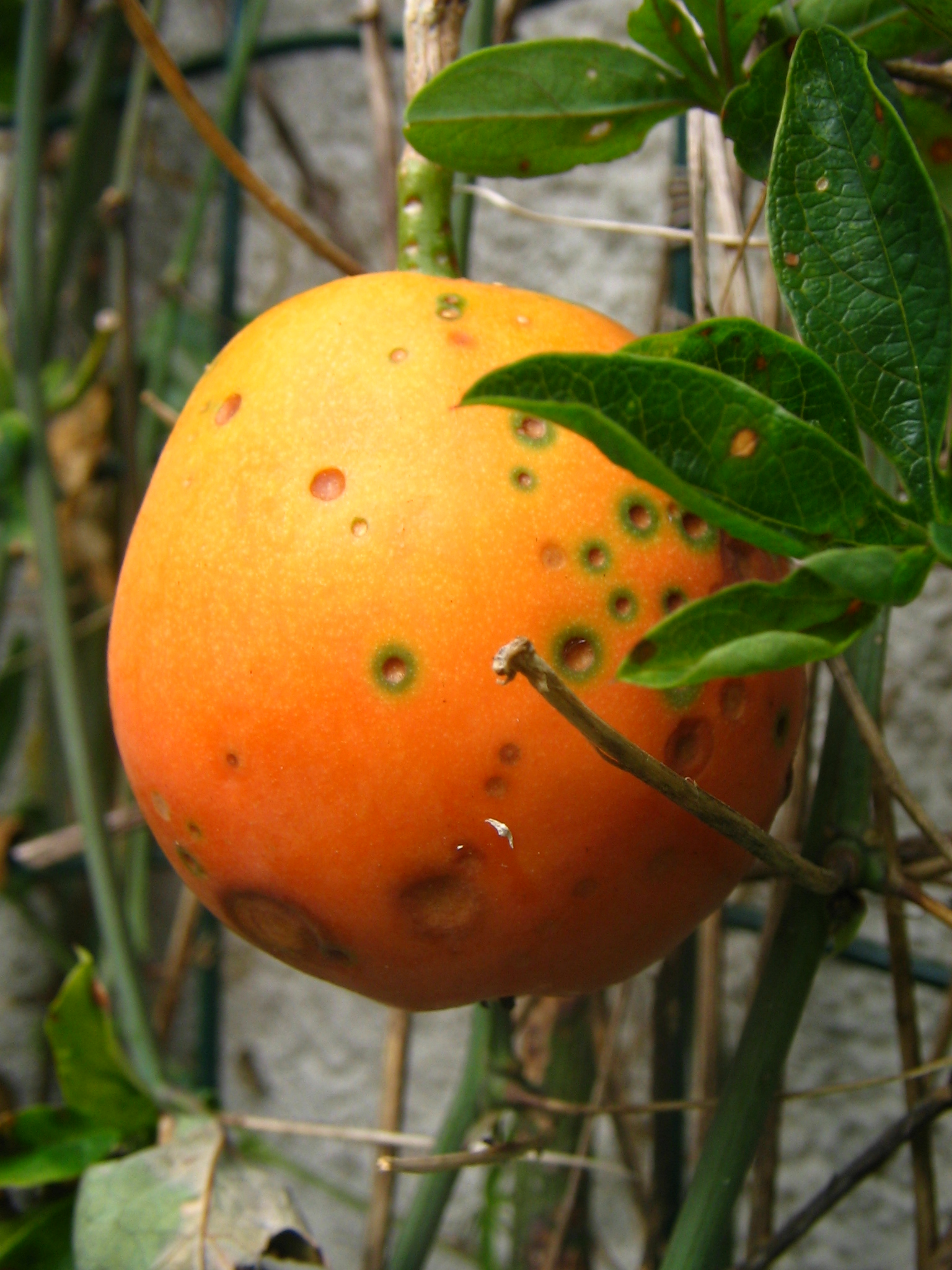
Fruit

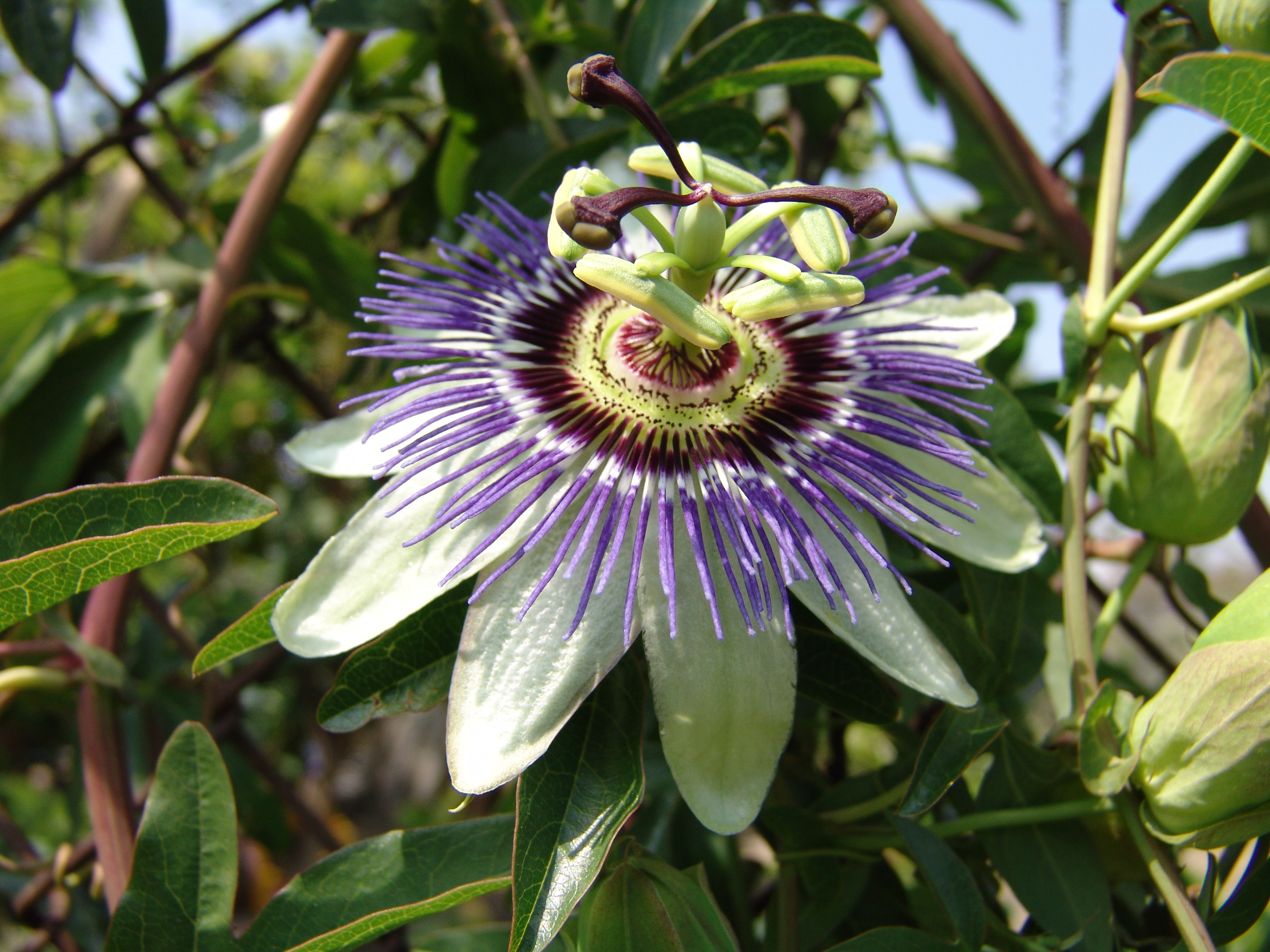
Flower

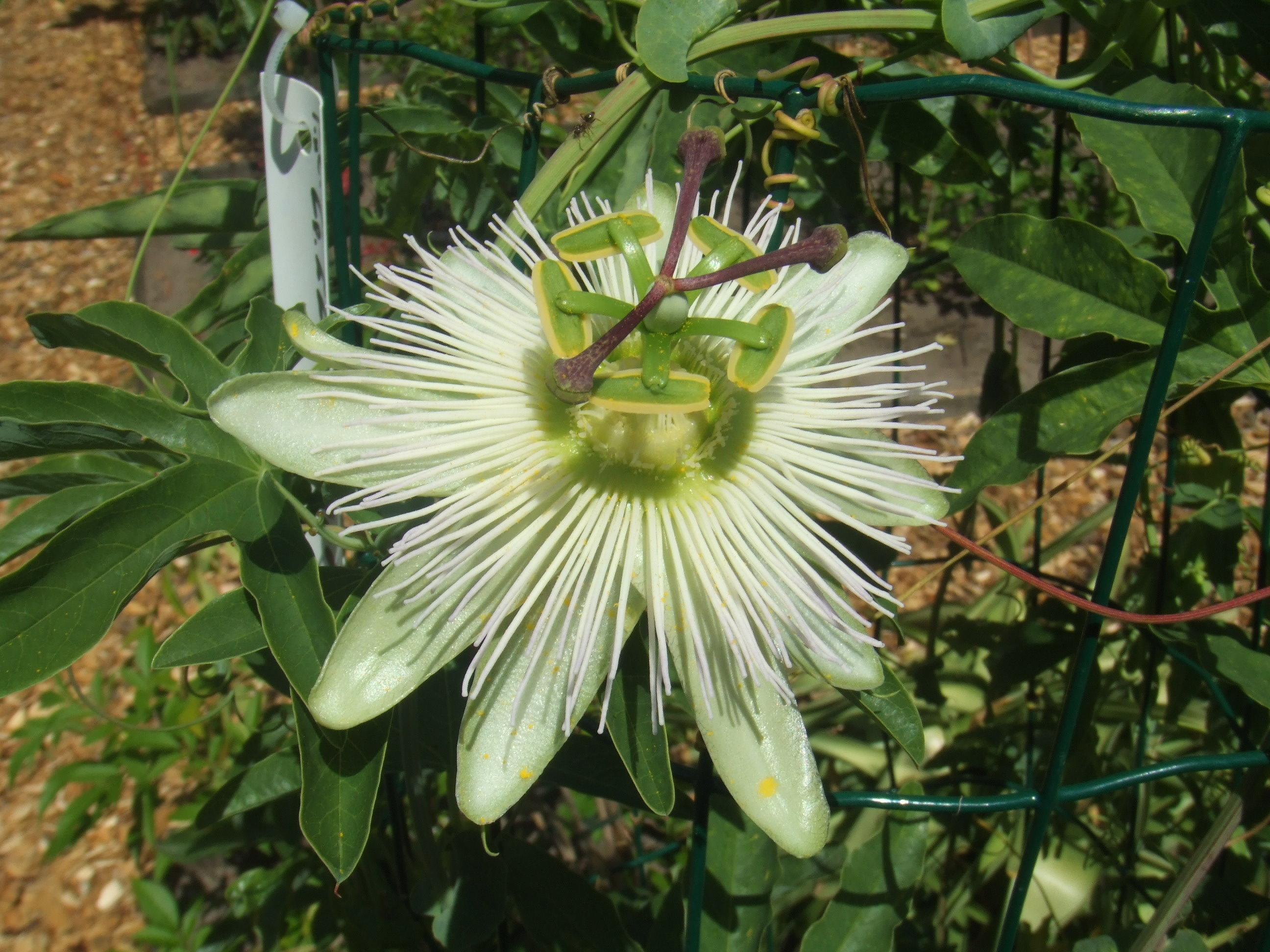
'Constance Elliot', a white flowered cultivar

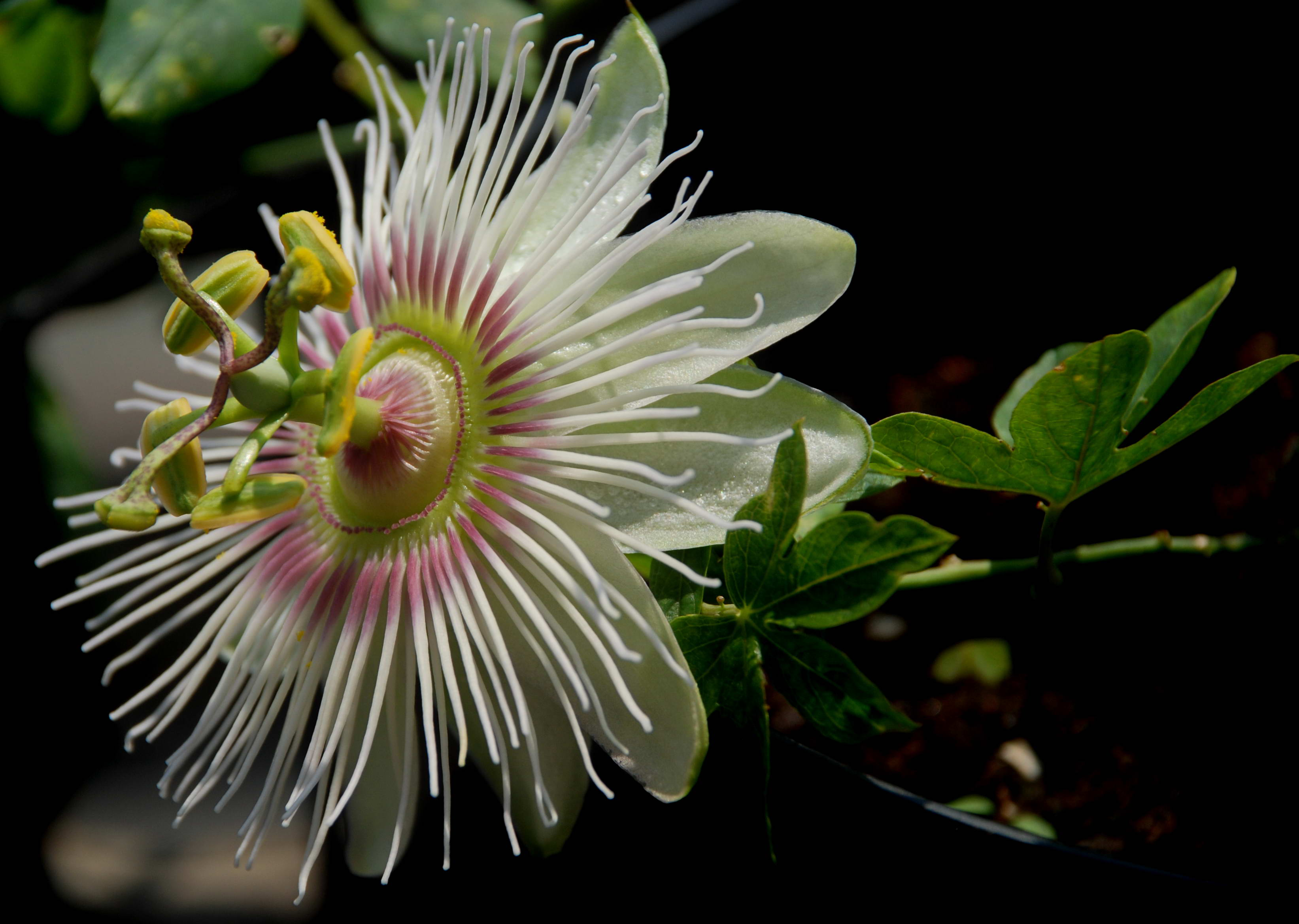
'Pierre Pomie', a pale pink flowered cultivar

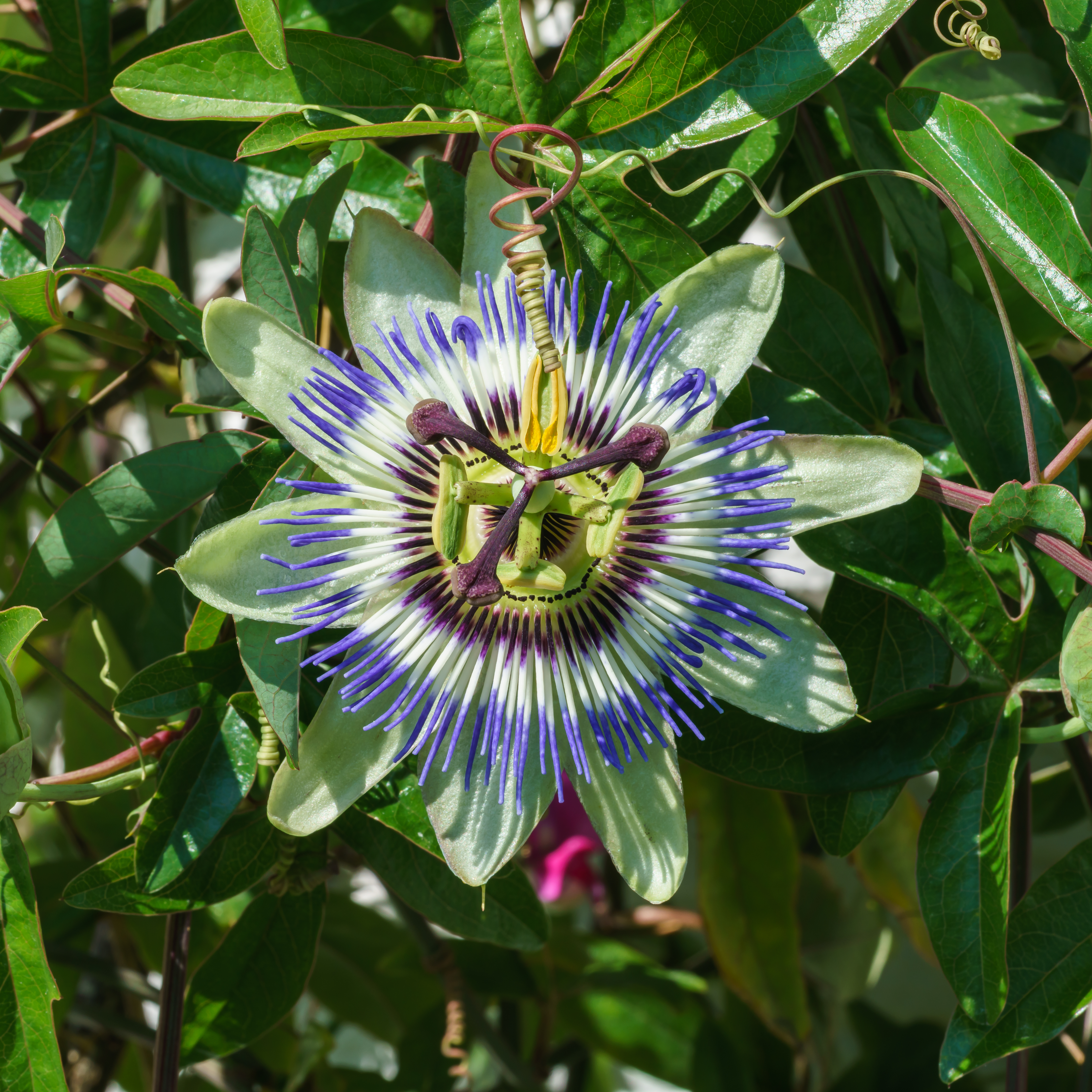
Peculiarity: two fused filaments force anthers upwards, displaying pollen beds otherwise not visible from this perspective.

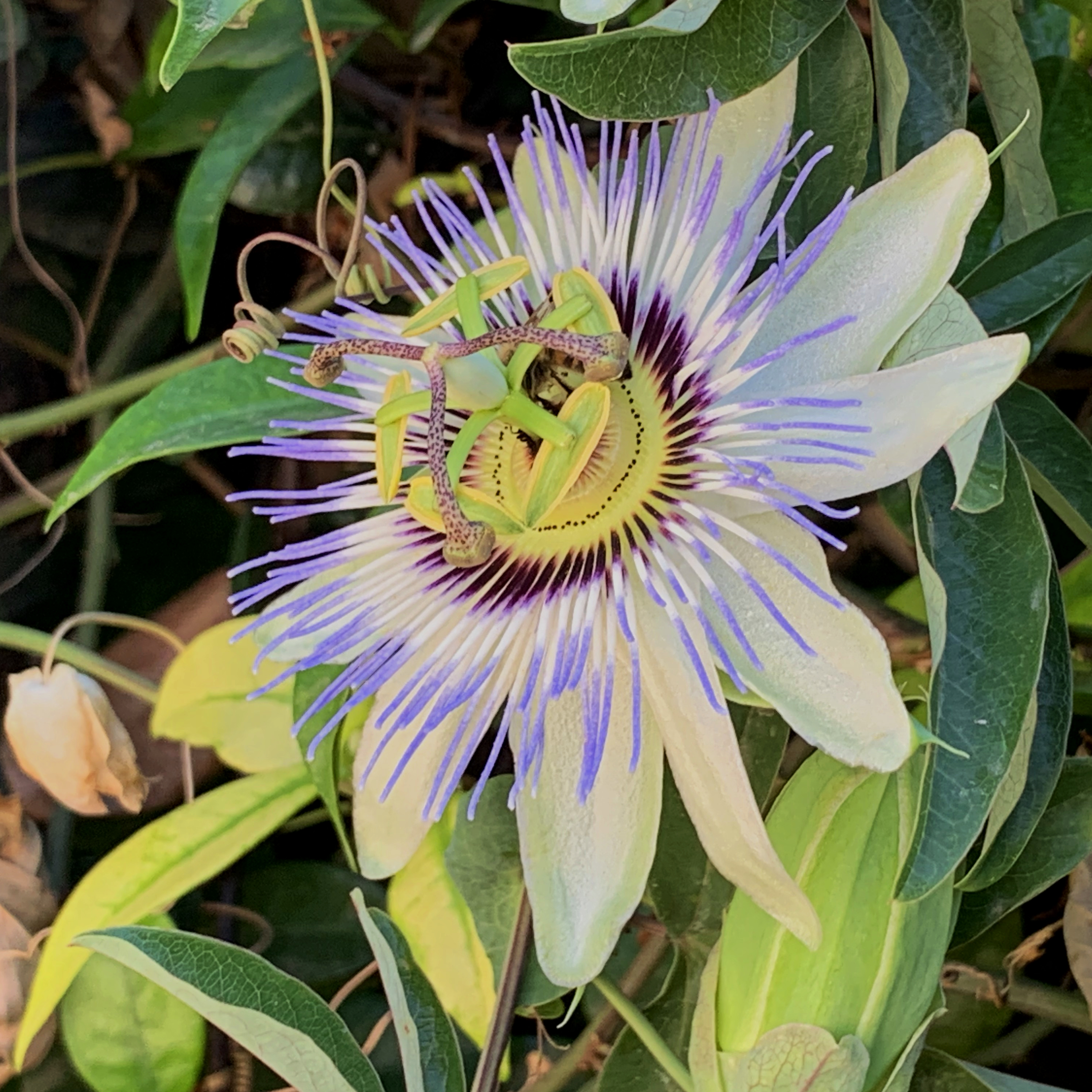
Flower

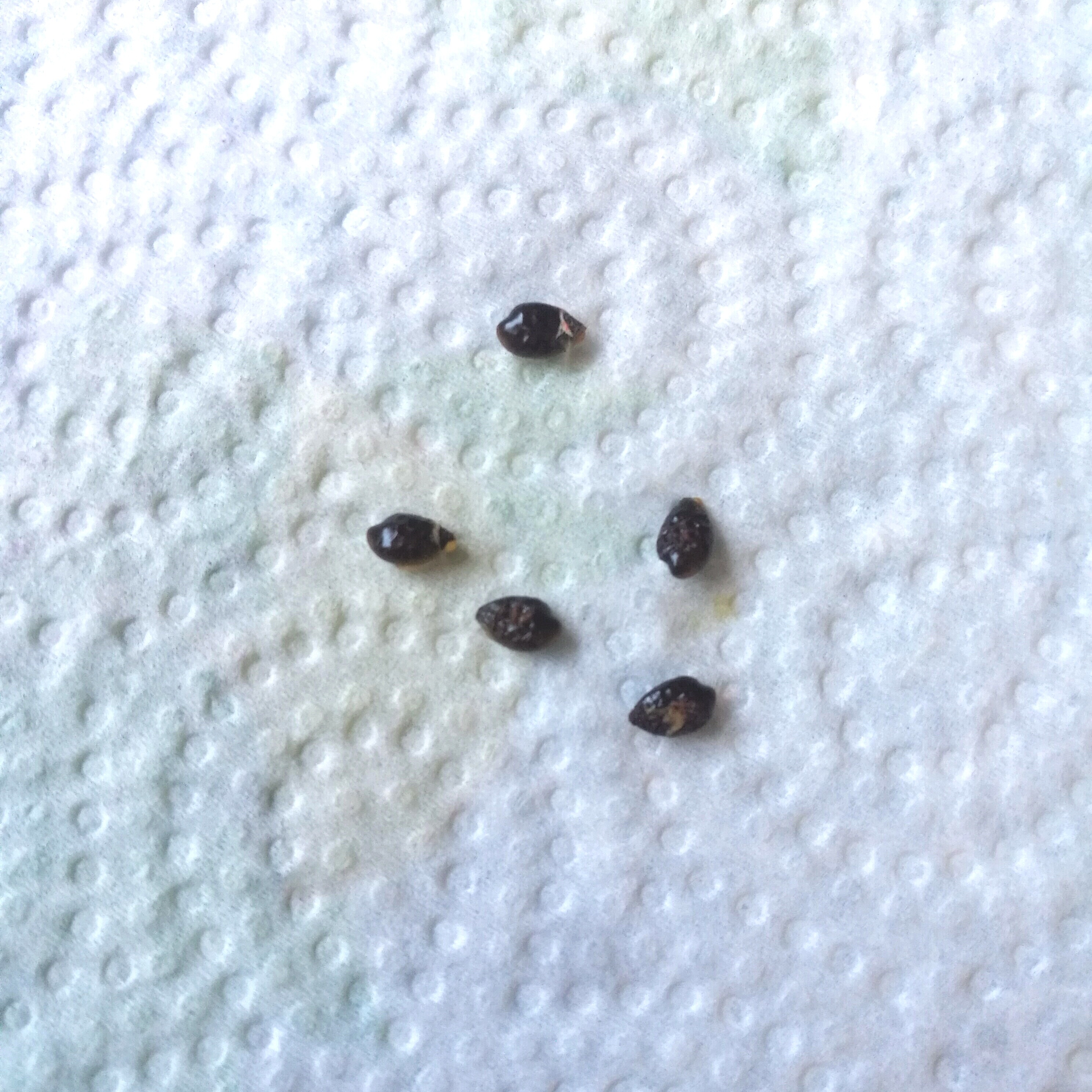
Seeds, the red gel-like substance around them removed

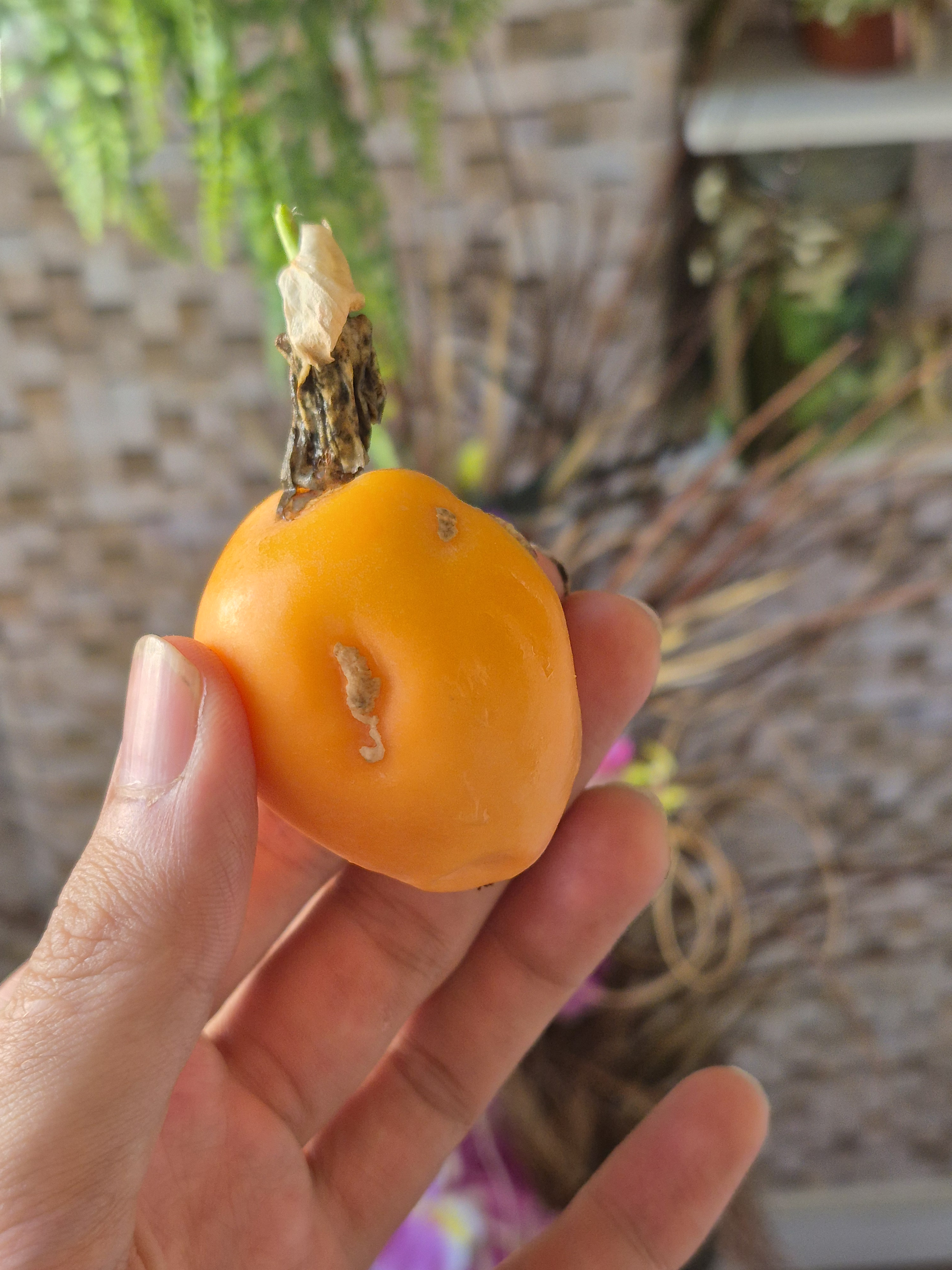
Whole fruit

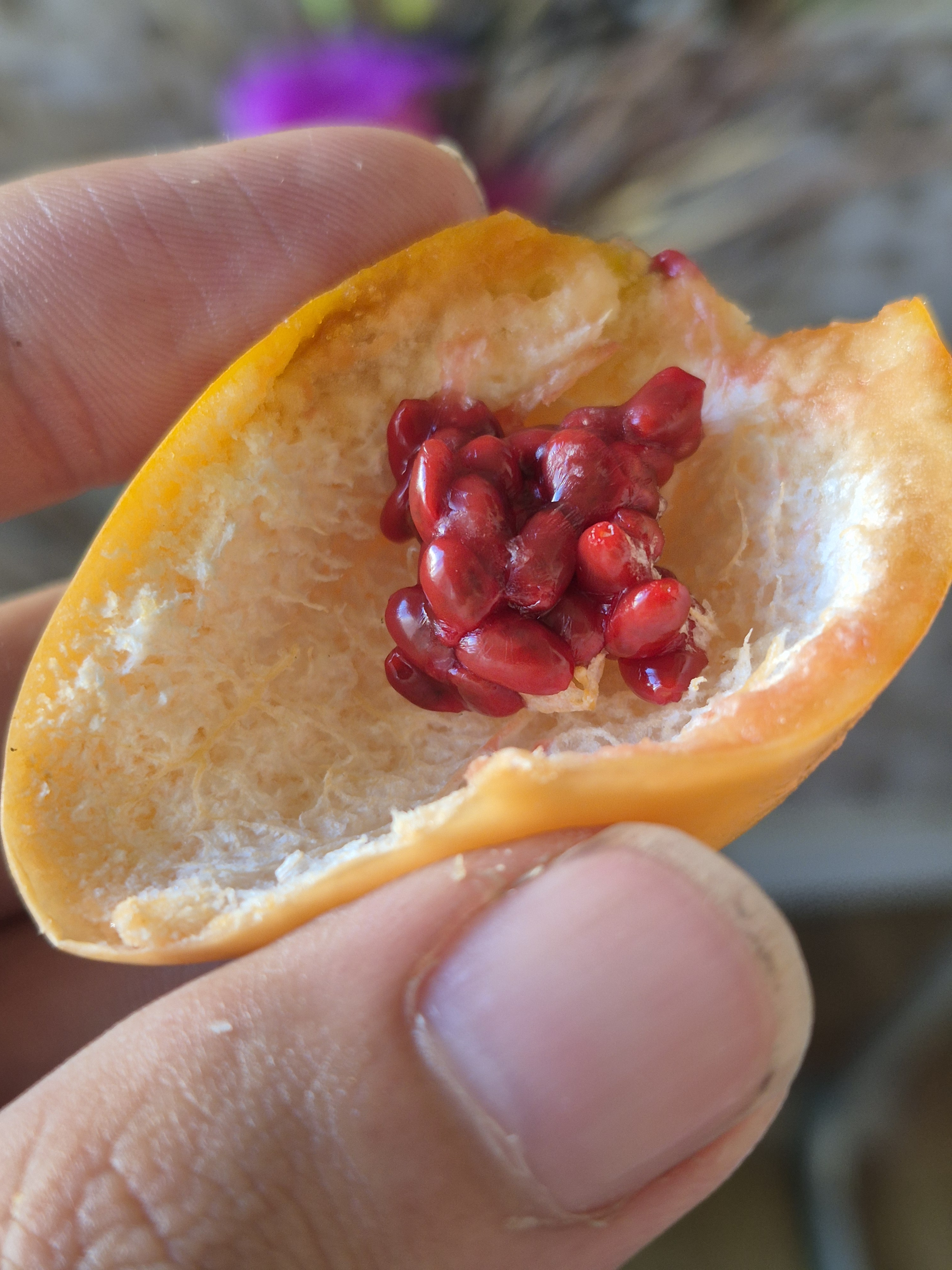
Fruit
