= Olivier Bilé =

Cameroonian lecturer and politician

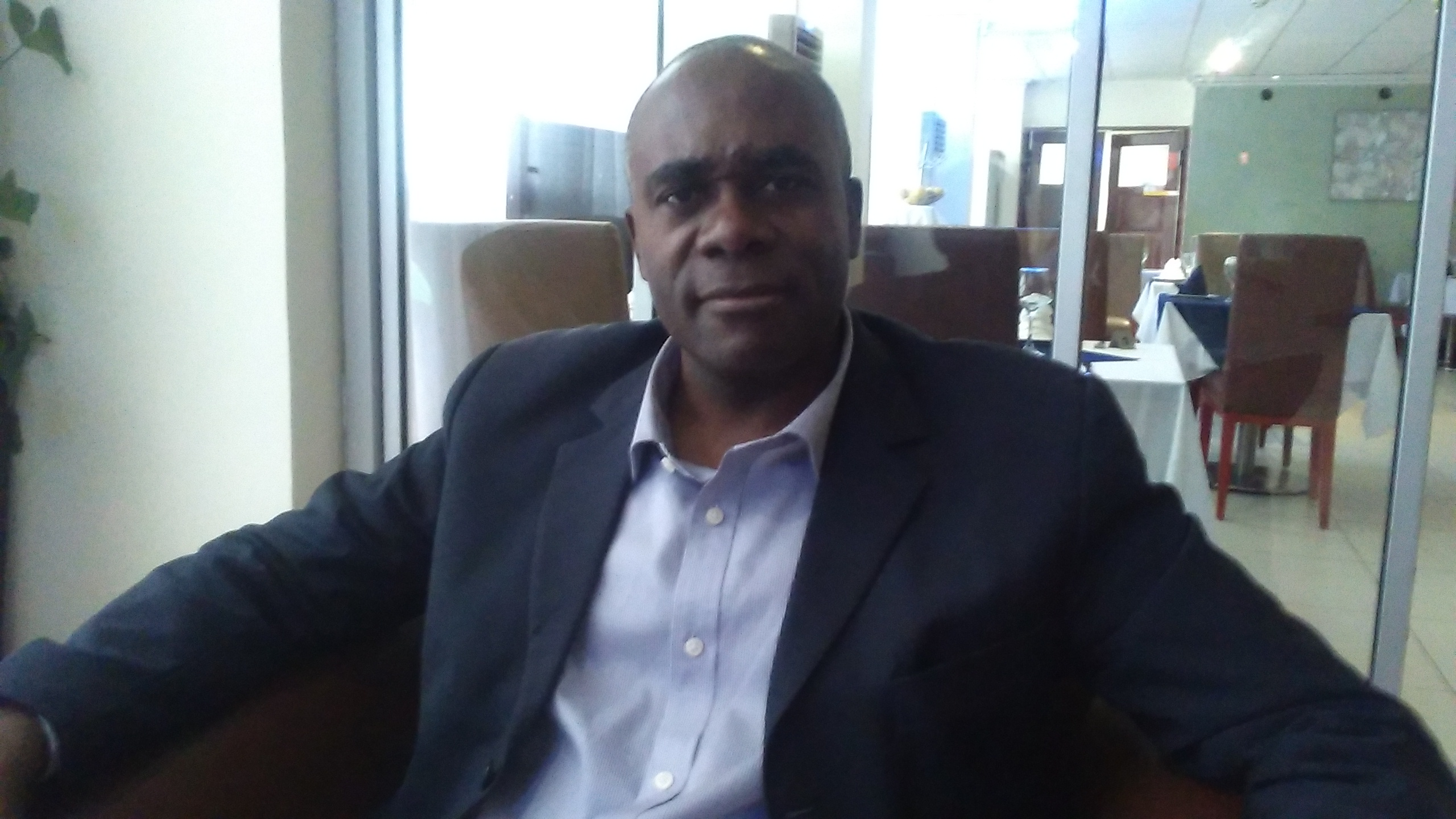
- Born: 16 April 1967; Doumé, Cameroon
- Occupations: University lecturer; Documentalist; Politician

Olivier Bilé (16 April 1967) is a Cameroonian university lecturer, documentalist, and politician.

== Biography ==
Bile teaches at the Higher School of Information Sciences and Techniques and Communications at the University of Yaoundé II. He has worked as a documentalist at Cameroon Radio Television.

He was a candidate in the 2011 presidential election. His candidacy for the 2018 presidential election was rejected by the Constitutional Council. Bilé has engaged with other members of the political opposition to develop a front for the 2025 presidential election.
