= Dume district =

Dume district was an administrative unit in Cameroon during the German colonial rule.

== District area ==
The district area, which was in the range of today's province of East Region (Cameroon), bordered on the west by the Yaoundé district, in the east by the French border. In the north of the Sanaga River (Lom) formed the boundary against the residency Adamawa, after 1913 residency Ngaoundéré. In the western part of the district, the Nyong was the southern border area against the Lomié District. In the south, the district also bordered the 1911 newly created district Molundu.

== Population ==
The area was inhabited primarily by Bantu peoples, especially Omvang, Makaa and Kaka as well as the Ubangi-speaking Gbaya. In the 1909 census, the total population amounted to 97,566 residents. Political centers of the indigenous population were Gamane/Bertua (Gbaya), Baturi, Mokbe, Bimba and Beri (Kaka).

== History ==
The development of the region by the colonial power began in 1897 with the expedition of Lieutenant Ernst von Carnap-Quernheimb in the Sanga-Ngoko area. In 1899 Regierungsrat (Senior Executive Officer) Dr. Plehn began in the southeastern tip of the colony with the establishment of the management of the Sanga-Ngoko district. In 1901-1903 Ludwig Freiherr von Stein Lausnitz undertook extensive expeditions in the Makaa, Gbaya Kaka and Territory and commenced in August 1902 with the disempowerment of the Bertua Chief and his replacement by his loyal son the integration into the German power structure of the area between Doume and the Sanaga River.

In 1906-07 there was a major armed conflict between the German protection force and the Omvang and Makaa in the region between the Sanaga, Dja and Doume. As a result, the transition area between forest and savanna between the 4th and 6 Latitude was removed from the Sanga-Ngoko Administration (District Lomi) and became independent. On Doume River was a fort which was named Dume, which was the county seat and location of the 9th Company of the protection force. Due to its location at the terminus of the navigability of the river, the place soon became the crossroads of important trade routes.

The First Administrative Officer of the district was Captain Peter Scheunemann, who was soon succeeded by Captain Adolf Schipper (* 12. Nov. 1875; † Nov. 4, 1915 in Cameroon). The troops forced the further pacification and development of the district area. After the killing of a German businessman, once again in May–July 1910 it came to a military conflict. The cause of the escalation of violence were the actions of the German and African traders, including attacks on the indigenous societies in the wake of the expansion of the rubber trade, but also the recruitment of the indigenes for control works and road construction, dam construction and river cleaning in the Doume. Within weeks, the riots were suppressed under the direction of Captain Hans Dominik. In 1913 the former Military District had been transformed into a civilian district. In 1916 the district came under the administration of the French, who moved the district headquarters to Bertoua.

== See also ==
- History of Kamerun

== Sources ==
- Florian Hoffmann: Okkupation und Militärverwaltung in Kamerun. Etablierung und Institutionalisierung des kolonialen Gewaltmonopols 1891–1914, Göttingen 2007
