= Byep language =

Bantu language spoken in Cameroon

Byep
- Maka
- North Makaa
- Native to: Cameroon
- Ethnicity: Makaa
- Native speakers: (9,500 cited 1988)
- Language family: Niger–Congo?: Atlantic–Congo; Benue–Congo; Bantu (Zone A); Makaa–Njem + Kako (A.80–90); Ndzem–Bomwali; Makaa; Byep
- Dialects: Besep

Language codes
- ISO 639-3: mkk
- Glottolog: byep1241
- Guthrie code: A.831

Byep, or (North) Makaa, is a Bantu language of Cameroon. Although spoken by the Makaa people and closely related, it is not intelligible with South Makaa.
