= Jérôme Obi Eta =

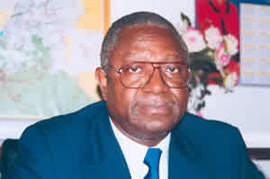
- Eta in 2007

Chairman of the Board of Directors of CAMWATER
- In office March 2006 – August 14, 2018
- Succeeded by: Patrick Kum Bong Akwa

Minister of Public Works of Cameroon
- In office December 7, 1997 – August 24, 2002
- Preceded by: Jean-Baptiste Bokam
- Succeeded by: Dieudonne Ambassa Zang

Personal details
- Born: October 10, 1950 Mamfe, British Cameroons (now Cameroon)
- Died: April 5, 2025 (aged 74) Yaounde, Cameroon
- Education: Mount Allison University; Queen's University of Kingston; University of Newcastle-upon-Tyne

Jérôme Obi Eta is a Cameroonian politician and engineer who served as the Cameroonian Minister of Public Works from 1997 to 2002 and as the chairman of the board of directors of the Cameroonian Water Utilities Corporation from 2006 to 2018.

== Biography ==
Eta was born on October 15, 1940 in Mamfe, British Cameroons. He began his education at a public school in Mamfe, and then went to Umuahia College in Umuahia (now in Nigeria) between 1953 and 1960, where he pursued the West African School Certificate in 1958 and the Cambridge Higher School Certificate in 1960. Eta then studied at Mount Allison University in Sackville, New Brunswick, Canada between 1961 and 1963 and later Queen's University at Kingston from 1963 to 1965 where he graduated with a bachelors in civil engineering. Eta then earned a master's degree in civil engineering from the University of Newcastle-Upon-Tyne in Great Britain.

Eta began his professional career in 1965, when he was assigned to the Department of Public Works of Northwest Region in Bamenda. In 1966, he was transferred to work in Limbé (then called Victoria). He then worked at the Cameroonian Ministry of Equipment, Urban Planning, and Housing. He rose his way up the ranks of the ministry and between 1993 and 1995 served as Inspector No. 1 at the Ministry.

Eta was appointed Minister of Public Works during a cabinet reshuffle in 1997, which he served as until 2002. From 2006 to 2018, Eta served as the chairman of the board of directors for the Cameroonian Water Utilities Corporation, or CAMWATER. Eta was replaced as chairman by Patrick Kum Bong Akwa, and just before being replaced was in a dispute with CAMWATER CEO Gervais Bolenga over Bolenga's appointment of managers without abiding by the rules.

Eta died on April 15, 2025 in Yaoundé.
