= Ngoulemakong =

Town and commune in the south of Cameroon

Coordinates: 3°05′N 11°26′E

- Commune and town
- Interactive map of Ngoulemakong
- Country: Cameroon

Population (2005)
  - Total: 14,675
- Time zone: UTC+1 (WAT)

Ngoulemakong is a town and commune in Cameroon, located in the Department of Mvila, in the South Region. It was created in 1955.

== See also ==
- Communes of Cameroon
