= Makaa people =

Ethnic group

Maka
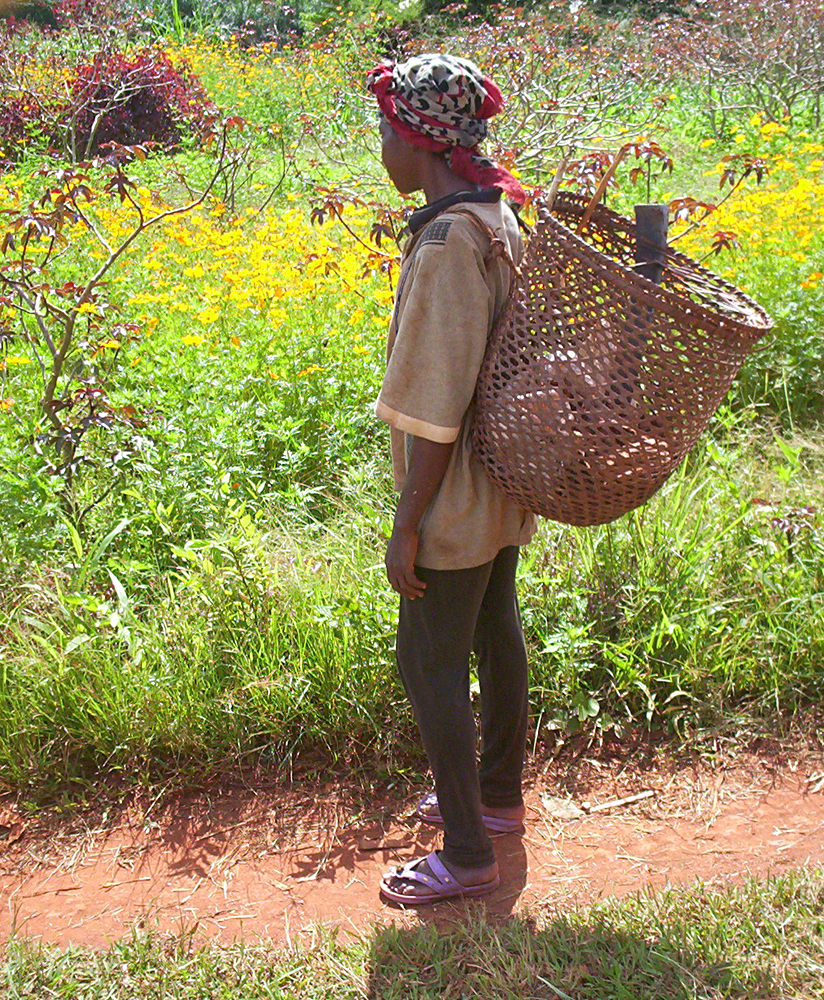
- Maka woman with panier on the way to her fields.

Total population
- Total: 89,500 (1987-8)

Regions with significant populations
- Cameroon

Languages
- Byep, Makaa

Religion
- Christian, traditional religions

Related ethnic groups
- Bajwe, Bakwele, Bekol, Benkonjo, Bomwali, Konabembe, Mabi, Mbimu, Ngumba, Njem, Nzime, Sso

The Maka or Makaa are a Bantu ethnic group inhabiting the southern rain forest zone of Cameroon. They live primarily in the northern portions of the Upper Nyong division of Cameroon's East Province. Major Maka settlements include Abong-Mbang, Doumé, and Nguélémendouka. Some Maka villages lie over the border into the Centre Province, as well.

Most Maka speak a language known as Maka or South Maka, which had an estimated 80,000 speakers in 1987. In the north of Maka territory, speakers use a related language known as Byep, or North Maka. Byep had an estimated 9,500 speakers in 1988. Though they consider themselves a single people, Maka dialects serve as a form of identity as well. The main dialects are Maka are Bebent (Bebende, Biken, Bewil, Bemina), Mbwaanz, and Sekunda. Byep has two dialects, Byep and Besep (Besha, Bindafum).

== History ==
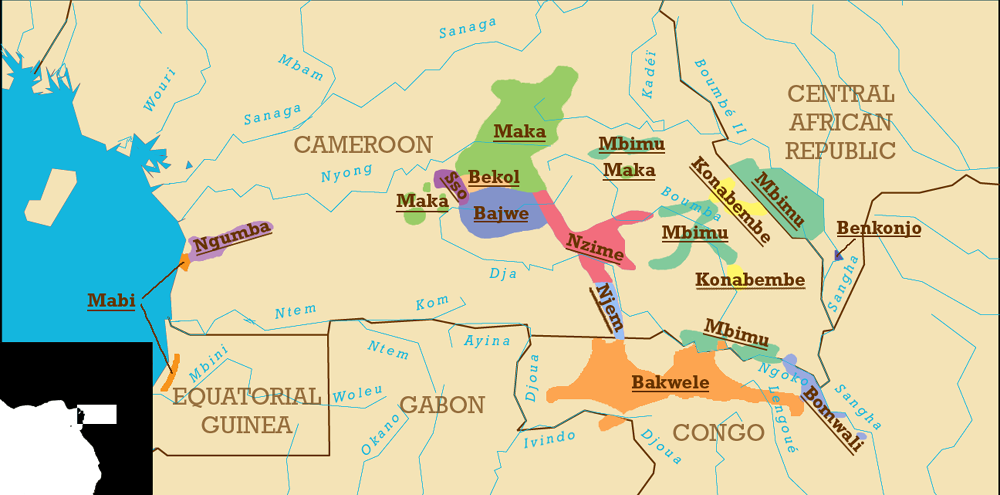
Speakers of Makaa–Njem languages in Cameroon and neighbouring countries.

The Maka and related speakers of Makaa–Njem languages entered present-day Cameroon from the Congo River basin or modern Chad between the 14th and 17th centuries. By the 19th century, they inhabited the lands north of the Lom River in the border region between the present-day East and Adamawa Provinces. Not long thereafter, however, the Beti-Pahuin peoples invaded these areas under pressure from the Vute and Mbum, themselves fleeing Fulani (Fula) warriors. The Maka-Njem peoples were forced south.

According to their oral traditions, the waves of migrants encountered the Baka nomads as they moved deeper into the rain forest. Either through force or diplomacy, the newcomers enlisted the Baka as guides, and they founded a series of new settlements, including Bung-Ngwang ("bathing area in the Nyong River") and Mess'a Mena ("crossroads") – later renamed Abong-Mbang and Messaména. Other groups continued their migration.

When the Germans entered the eastern Maka zone after taking colonial control of Cameroon in 1884, the natives were enlisted as forced labour to build German roads and to work German plantations. The Dume district existed an as administrative unit in German Cameroon during the German colonial rule. France succeeded Germany as the colonial power in 1916, and the Maka continued to work foreign-owned plantations under them.

Since Cameroon's independence in 1960, the Maka have established themselves as a formidable political force in the East Province. They have not gained much voice in national politics, however, and Cameroon's two presidential administrations have largely ignored them. Maka discontent is rising, however, especially in regard to the low level of infrastructure improvements initiated by the government in their territory. This sentiment manifested most recently in the 2004 presidential election when the incumbent, Paul Biya, failed to carry the town of Abong-Mbang.

== Lifestyle and settlement patterns ==
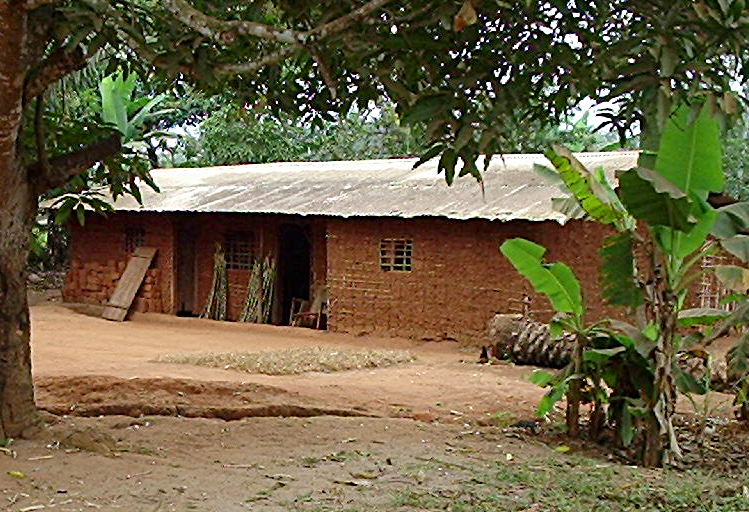
Typical Maka house in Abong-Mbang.

The majority of Makaa are subsistence farmers. Their settlements typically follow existing roads, making the typical village a linear string of houses facing the road and backed by forest. Fields are usually very small and planted in clearings cut out of the forest with axes and machetes and then burned. Major crops include manioc, plantains, and maize, with bananas, cocoyams, groundnuts, and various fruits raised in smaller quantities. Livestock are typically small animals that may be left to roam unattended, such as goats, sheep, pigs, and chickens. A smaller number of Maka have obtained financial success in the cocoa and coffee plantations of Cameroon's forest region.

Hunting is another common pursuit, especially in the smaller villages. Traps are the primary tool employed, though firearms are increasingly used today. Bushmeat caught in this way is becoming an important, if unsustainable, source of income for many people.

The traditional Maka house is a rectangular structure made of mud bricks held together by a bamboo frame. The A-shaped roof is covered in raffia palm leaves, though tin or aluminium roofing is today becoming more common. Wealthier Maka and those living in larger villages and towns often live in modern concrete-block houses, as well.

Social organisation begins with the family, which consists of a man, his wife or wives, and his children. Several related families often live together to form a village. At the next level are several villages that claim common ancestry to form a clan. In the past, these clan identities were of the utmost importance, determining one's friends, lineage, and potential spouses. This clan identity is much weaker today, however. Each clan is headed by a chief, though the modern chiefs are little more than figureheads.

The vast majority of Maka practice at least nominal Christianity with a fairly even split between Catholicism and Protestantism. Vestiges of their native animism still persist, however, especially in the realm of traditional medicine. Folk superstitions also remain, such as belief in witchcraft.
