= Dja-et-Lobo =

Coordinates: 2°56′N 12°00′E

- Department
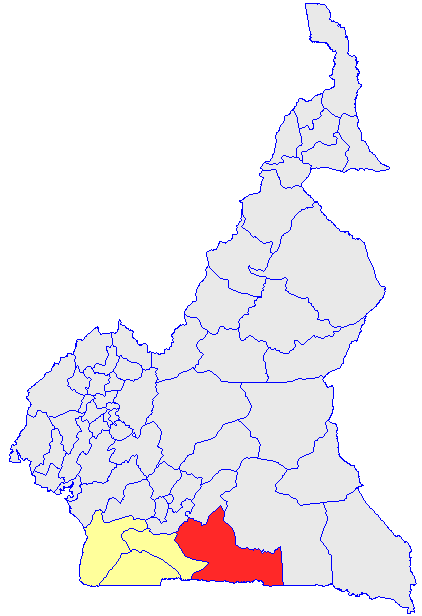
- Department location in Cameroon
- Country: Cameroon
- Province: South Province
- Capital: Sangmélima

Area
  - Total: 19,911 km^{2} (7,688 sq mi)

Population (2005)
  - Total: 196,951
  - Density: 9.8916/km^{2} (25.619/sq mi)
- Time zone: UTC+1 (WAT)

Dja-et-Lobo is a department of South Province in Cameroon. The department covers an area of 19,911 km^{2} and as of 2005 had a total population of 196,951. Its capital is Sangmélima.

== Subdivisions ==
The department is divided administratively into 9 communes and in turn into villages.

=== Communes ===
1. Bengbis
2. Djoum
3. Meyomessala
4. Meyomessi
5. Mintom
6. Oveng
7. Sangmélima (urban)
8. Sangmélima (rural)
9. Zoétélé

== See also ==
- Communes of Cameroon
