= Biwong-Bane =

Coordinates: 3.1833°N 11.2167°E

- Commune and town
- Interactive map of Biwong-Bane
- Country: Cameroon
- Time zone: UTC+1 (WAT)

Biwong-Bane is a town and commune in Cameroon.

== See also ==
- Communes of Cameroon
