= Meyomessala =

Coordinates: 2.7203°N 11.7068°E

- Commune and town
- Interactive map of Meyomessala
- Country: Cameroon
- Region: South
- Department: Dja-et-Lobo
- Time zone: UTC+1 (WAT)

Meyomessala is a town and commune in Cameroon.

== See also ==
- Communes of Cameroon
