= Meyomessi =

Coordinates: 2.8167°N 12.2000°E

- Commune and town
- Interactive map of Meyomessi
- Country: Cameroon
- Time zone: UTC+1 (WAT)

Meyomessi is a town and commune in Cameroon.

== See also ==
- Communes of Cameroon
