= Mengong =

Coordinates: 2.9330°N 11.4170°E

- Commune and town
- Interactive map of Mengong
- Country: Cameroon
- Time zone: UTC+1 (WAT)

Mengong is a town and commune in Cameroon.

== See also ==
- Communes of Cameroon
