= Mintom =

Coordinates: 2.7000°N 13.2833°E

- Commune and town
- Interactive map of Mintom
- Country: Cameroon
- Time zone: UTC+1 (WAT)

Mintom is a town and commune in Cameroon.

== Climate ==
Rainfall is 53 centimetres (21 in) for July in Mintom.

== See also ==
- Communes of Cameroon
