= Sangmélima =

Town in Cameroon

- Town
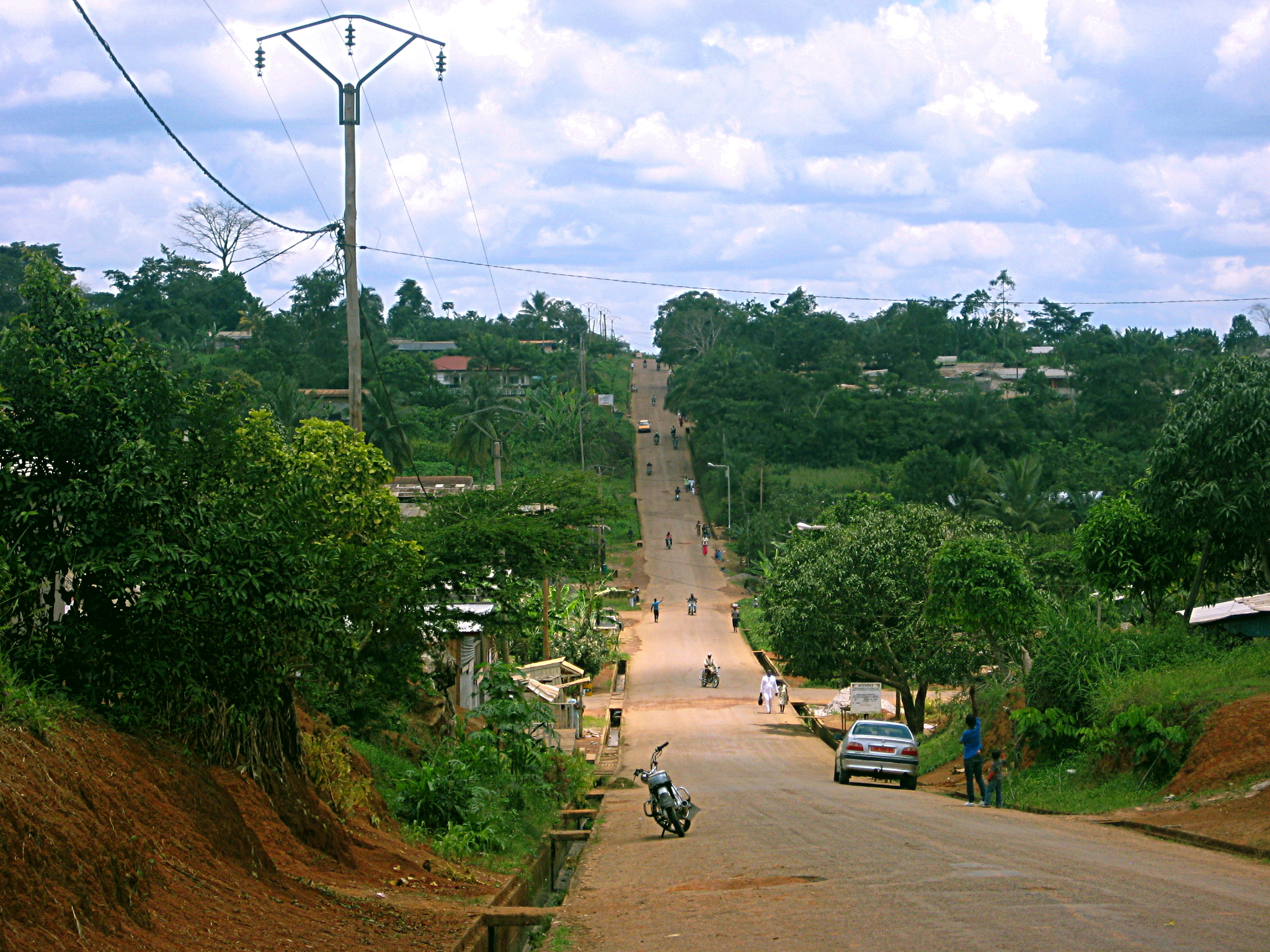
- Sangmélima in 2014

- Location in Cameroon
- Coordinates: 2°56′N 11°59′E
- Country: Cameroon
- Region: South Region
- Division: Dja-et-Lobo

Area
  - Total: 82,513 ha (203,890 acres)
- Elevation: 643 m (2,110 ft)

Population (2012)
  - Total: 64,227
  - Density: 77.839/km^{2} (201.60/sq mi)

Sangmélima is a town on the Lobo River, and also the chief town of Dja-et-Lobo, in the South Region of Cameroon. The language spoken there is Bulu.

== History ==
In 1963, the Roman Catholic Diocese of Sangmélima was founded.

== Economy ==
=== Bushmeat ===
In Sangmélima, bushmeat is prevalent and publicly traded, with local authorities overlooking its sale. Hunters gather meat from nearby forests, and are transported to villages, where they sell on temporary tables. Being situated near the Dja Faunal Reserve, as well as being at the center of Dja-et-Lobo, Sangmélima is the department's center for bushmeat trade.

Animals such as chimpanzees, duikers and gorillas are hunted, and they are eaten because of local belief that its medicinal. Through the 2010s, the price of bushmeat exceeded conventional meat. The consumption of such meat has caused ebola outbreaks in the area.

== Transportation ==
Sangmélima was connected to Ouésso by ferry until 2021, when a 321.5-kilometer road connected the two, costing US$354 million. The road's opening ceremony was attended by Emmanuel Nganou Djoumessi. Another road—65 kilometers in length—connected Sangmélima to Bikoula. Construction began c. 2012.
