= Mvangane =

Coordinates: 2°38′N 11°44′E

- Commune and town
- Interactive map of Mvangane
- Country: Cameroon
- Time zone: UTC+1 (WAT)

Mvangane is a town and commune in Cameroon.

== See also ==
- Communes of Cameroon
