= Oveng =

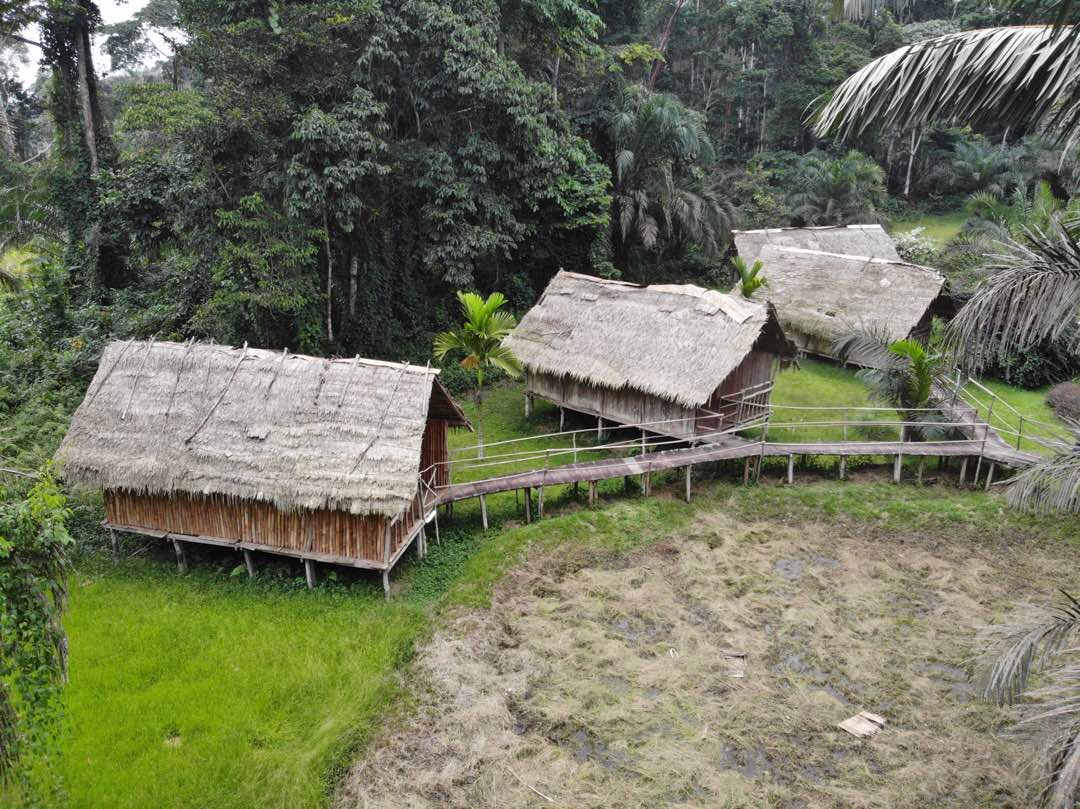
- Huts in Oveng Forest

- Location in Cameroon
- Coordinates: 2°19′48″N 11°7′48″E
- Country: Cameroon
- Province: South Province
- Elevation: 631 m (2,070 ft)

Oveng
- Commune and town
- Interactive map of Oveng
- Country: Cameroon
- Time zone: UTC+1 (WAT)

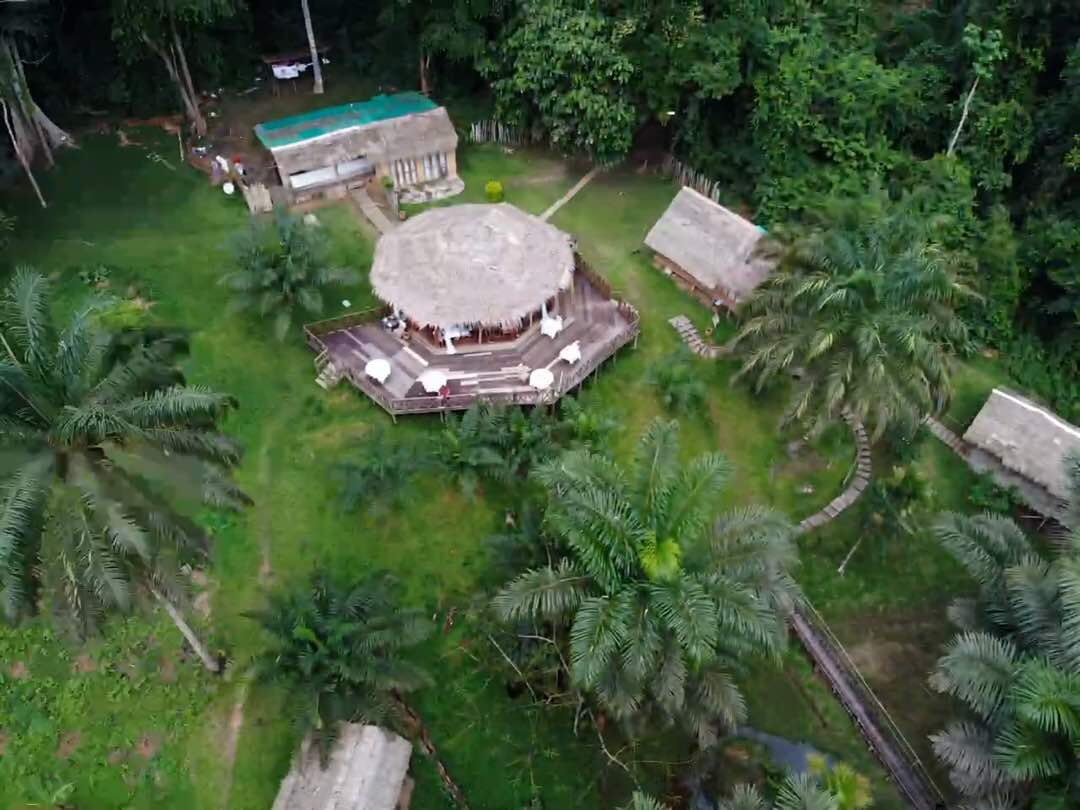
View of Oveng Forest Lodge, South Cameroon

Oveng is a town and commune in the South Province of Cameroon. It is located on the Kam River near the southern border with Equatorial Guinea and near the Ntem River.

== Climate ==
Oveng has a Tropical wet and dry or savanna climate (Classification: Aw). The district’s yearly temperature is 25.45 °C (77.81 °F) and it is -1.36% lower than Cameroon’s averages. Oveng typically receives about 132.95 millimetres (5.23 inches) of precipitation and has 253.55 rainy days (69.47% of the time) annually.

== Gallery ==
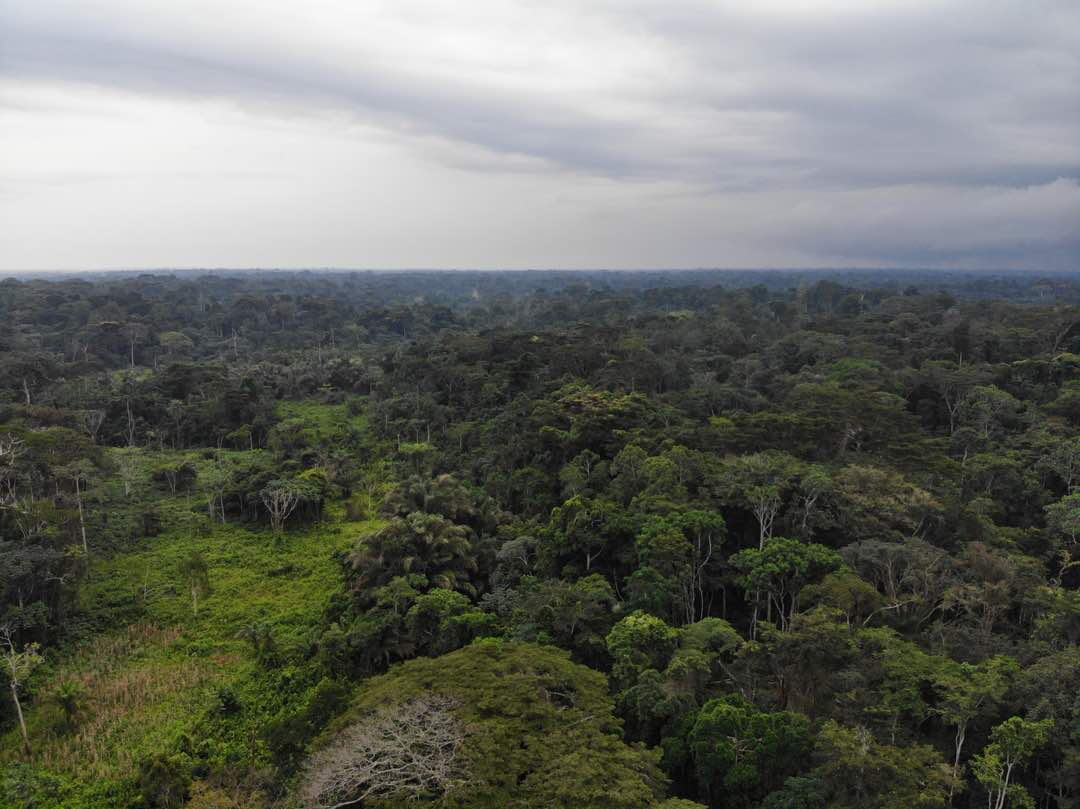
Oveng Forest

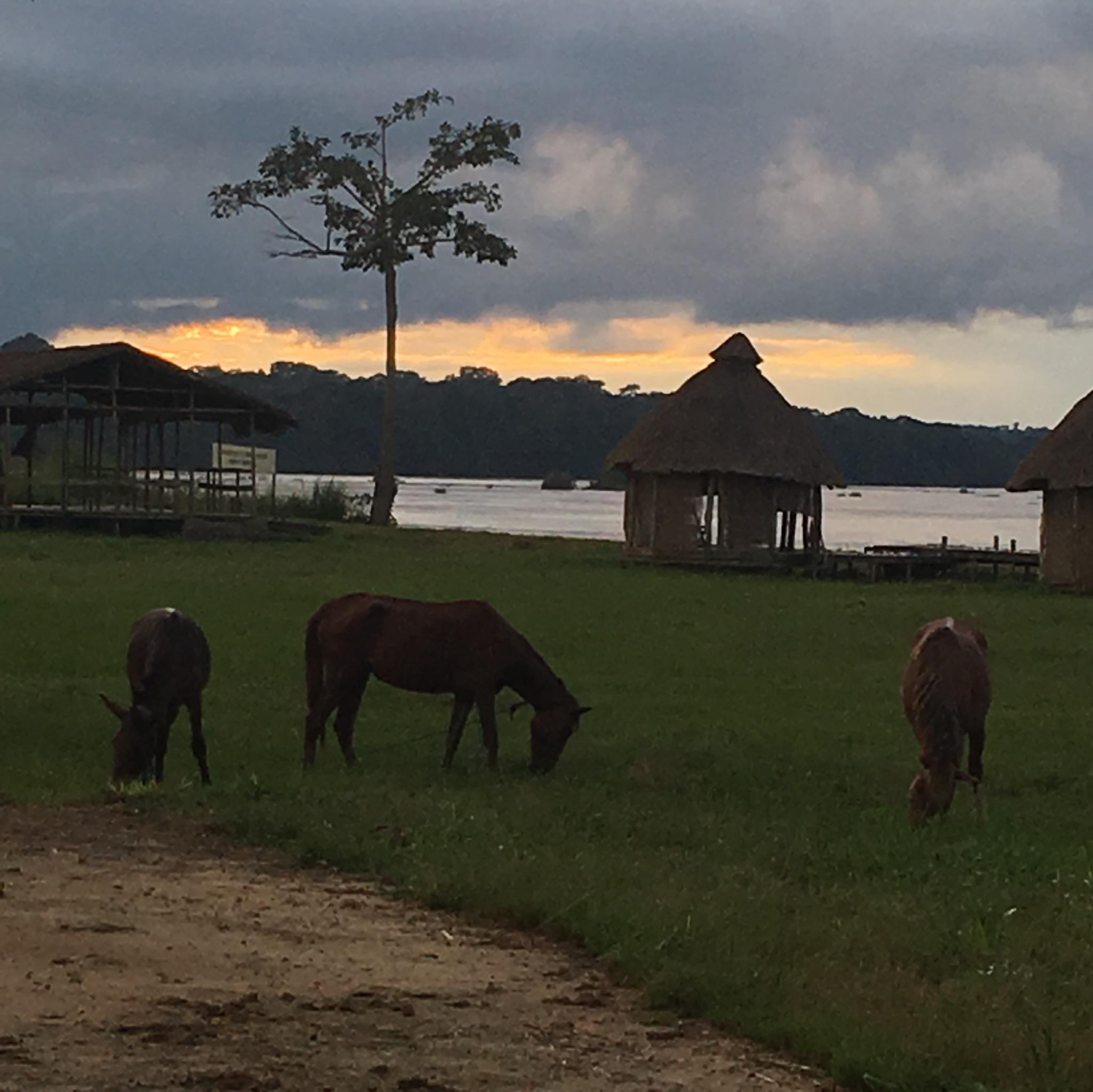
Horses grazing on grass

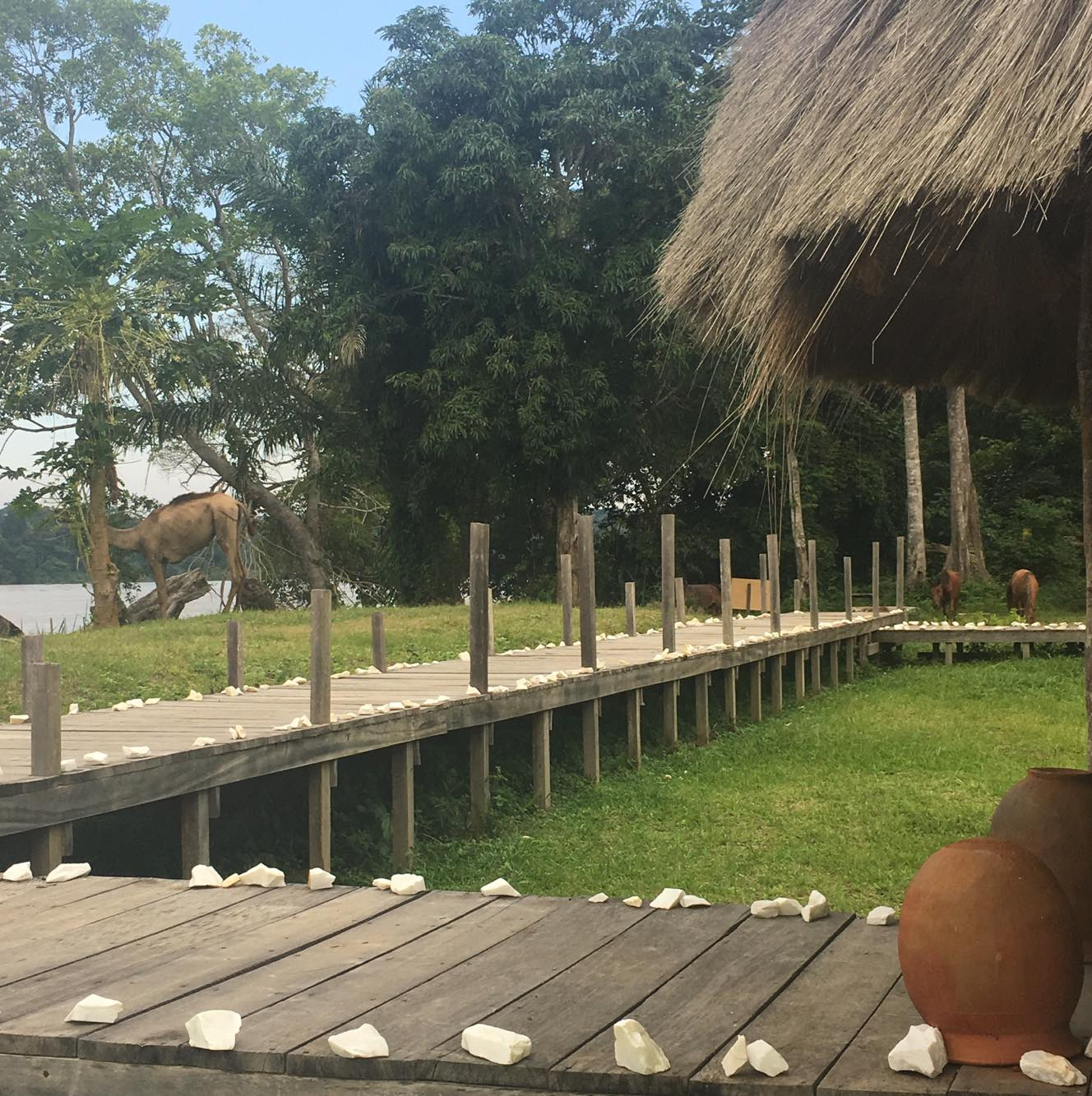
Horses

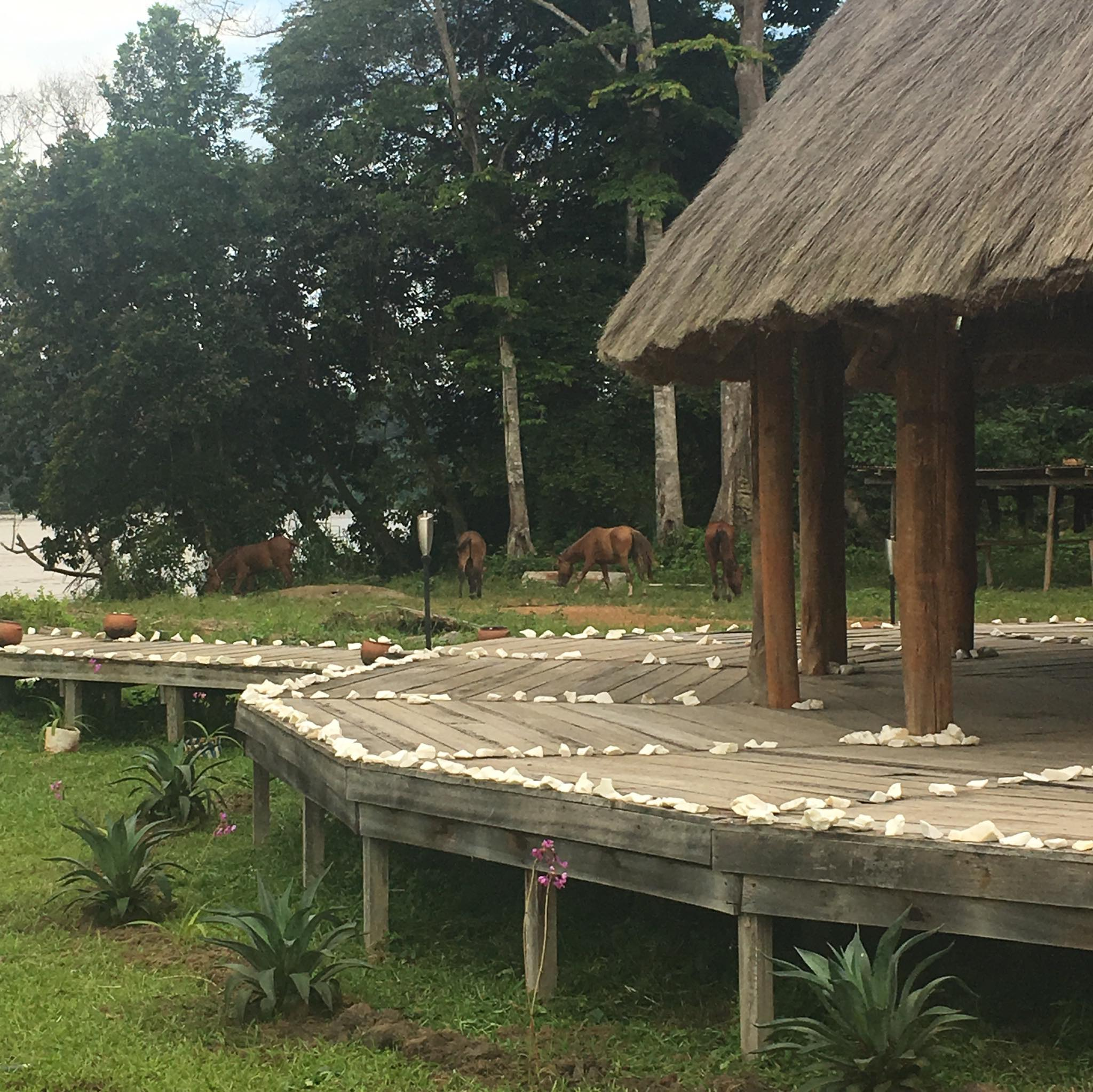
Horses near the cabins

== See also ==
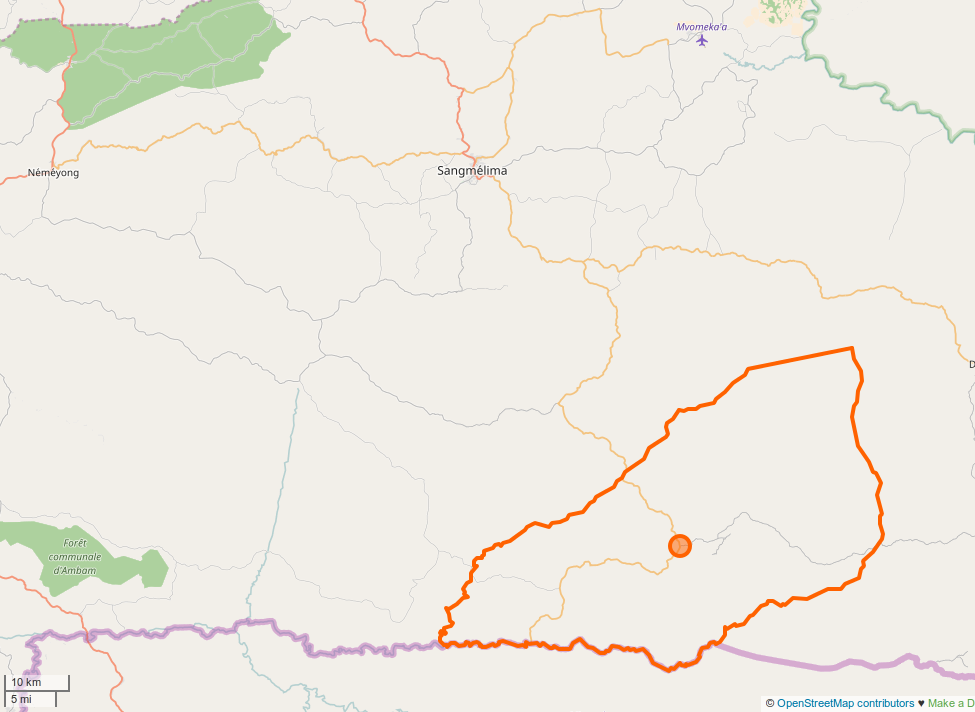
- Oveng in Cameroon ː city boundaries with OSM.
  Communes of Cameroon
