= Djoum =

- Location in Cameroon
- Coordinates: 2°40′N 12°40′E
- Country: Cameroon
- Region: South

Djoum is a town in South Region, Cameroon.

== Maps ==
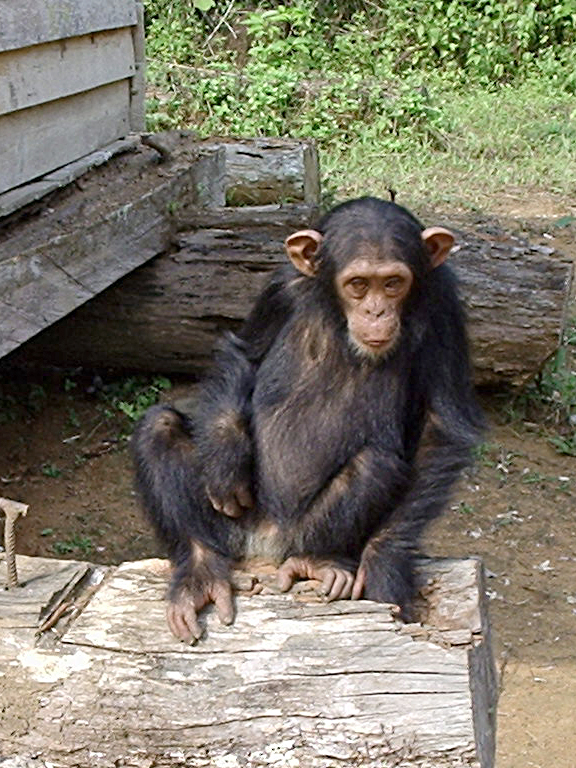
- Rescued chimpanzee (Pan troglodytes) near Djoum, South Province, Cameroon.
  Djoum map.

== See also ==
- Communes of Cameroon
