= Bengbis =

Coordinates: 3°27′N 12°27′E

- Commune and town
- Interactive map of Bengbis
- Country: Cameroon
- Time zone: UTC+1 (WAT)

Bengbis is a town and commune in Cameroon.

== See also ==
- Communes of Cameroon
