= Doumé, Cameroon =

Coordinates: 3°48′N 12°56′E

Doumé
- Commune and town
- Interactive map of Doumé
- Country: Cameroon
- Time zone: UTC+1 (WAT)

Doumé is a town and commune in Cameroon.

== Notable people ==
Olivier Bilé - Lecturer and politician

== See also ==
- Communes of Cameroon
