= Njem people =

Njyem
Total population
- Total: 7,000 (2003)

Regions with significant populations
- Cameroon, the Republic of the Congo

Languages
- Njyem

Religion
- Christianity, African Traditional Religion

Related ethnic groups
- Badwe'e, Bakwele, Bekol, Benkonjo, Bomwali, Konabembe, Maka, Kwasio people (Mabi and Mvumbo), Mpyemo (Mbimu), Nzime, Sso

The Njyem (or Njem or Ndjem) are an ethnic group inhabiting the rain forest zone of southern Cameroon and northern Republic of the Congo. In Cameroon, the Njyem live along the road running south from Lomié, passing the government center of Ngoyla and going as far south as Djadom. From there, footpaths extend to Souanke in northern Congo. Their territory lies south of the Nzime people and north of the Bekwel, both related groups. Ngoyla is the largest Njyem center. Souanke is equally important, but is a center shared with the Bekwel. They speak Njyem ("NJY"), one of the Makaa–Njem Bantu languages.

== History ==
The Makaa–Njyem-speaking peoples entered present-day Cameroon from the Congo River basin or modern Chad between the 14th and 17th centuries. By the 19th century, they inhabited the lands north of the Lom River in the border region between the present-day East and Adamawa Provinces. Not long thereafter, however, the Beti-Pahuin peoples invaded these areas under pressure from the Vute and Mbum, themselves fleeing Fulani (Fula) warriors. The Makaa–Njyem speakers were forced south.

Some groups remained in the vicinity of the Nyong and Dja rivers, while others continued their migration. This latter group included the Njyem.

The Njeme people and the Njyem are ethnically one, but they were separated by the Badwe'e and the Nzime. The Njeme are located on the road from Abong Mbang to Lomie, beginning after the last Mekaa village and extending as far as Mindourou. Other Njeme villages are in Adjela and Lomie. The Njeme speak a dialect of Koonzime. The Njyem, although being ethnically one with the Njeme, speak a distinct language. They are found south of the Dja River where it passes Zoulabot.

== Lifestyle and settlement patterns ==
The majority of Njyem are subsistence farmers. Their settlements tend to follow existing roads, making the typical village a linear string of houses facing the road and backed by forest. Fields are typically very small, usually planted in clearings cut out of the forest with axes and machetes and then burned. Major crops include manioc, plantains, and maize, with bananas, cocoyams, groundnuts, and various fruits raised in smaller quantities. Livestock are typically small animals that may be left to roam unattended, such as goats, sheep, pigs, and chickens. A smaller number of Njyem have obtained financial success in the cocoa and coffee plantations of Cameroon's forest region.

Hunting is another common pursuit, especially in the smaller villages. Traps are the primary tool employed, though firearms are increasingly used today. Bushmeat caught in this way is becoming an important, if unsustainable, source of income for many people.

Some Njyem groups share a codependent relationship with Cameroon's Baka pygmies. The Njyem trade manufactured goods and cultivated crops for pygmy-supplied forest game.

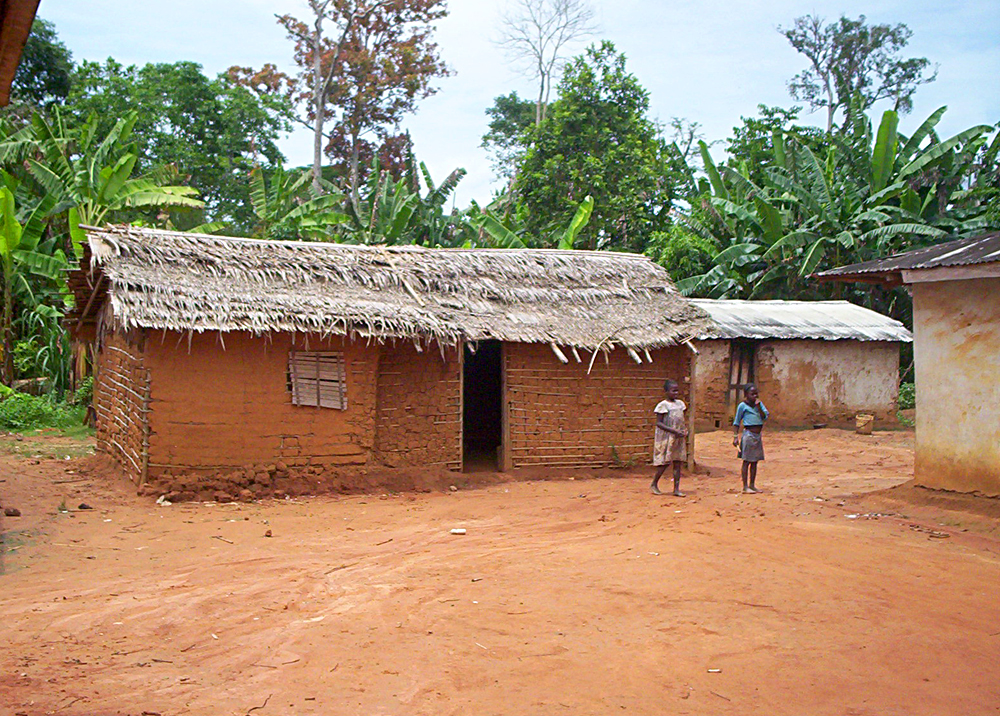
Njem house in Cameroon

The traditional Njyem house is a rectangular structure made of leaves folded over a raffia branch and pinned in place with a small twig. Alternatively, strips of bark could be used for the sides. The A-shaped roof is covered in raffia palm leaves. Present-day houses are made of vertical poles with raffia strips lashed horizontally inside and out. Mud is packed between the poles and held in place by the raffia strips. The roofs continue to consist of thatches made of raffia palm leaves, although aluminium roofing is also being used when finances permit. Wealthier Njyem and those living in larger villages and towns often live in houses employing mud-blocks or concrete-blocks.

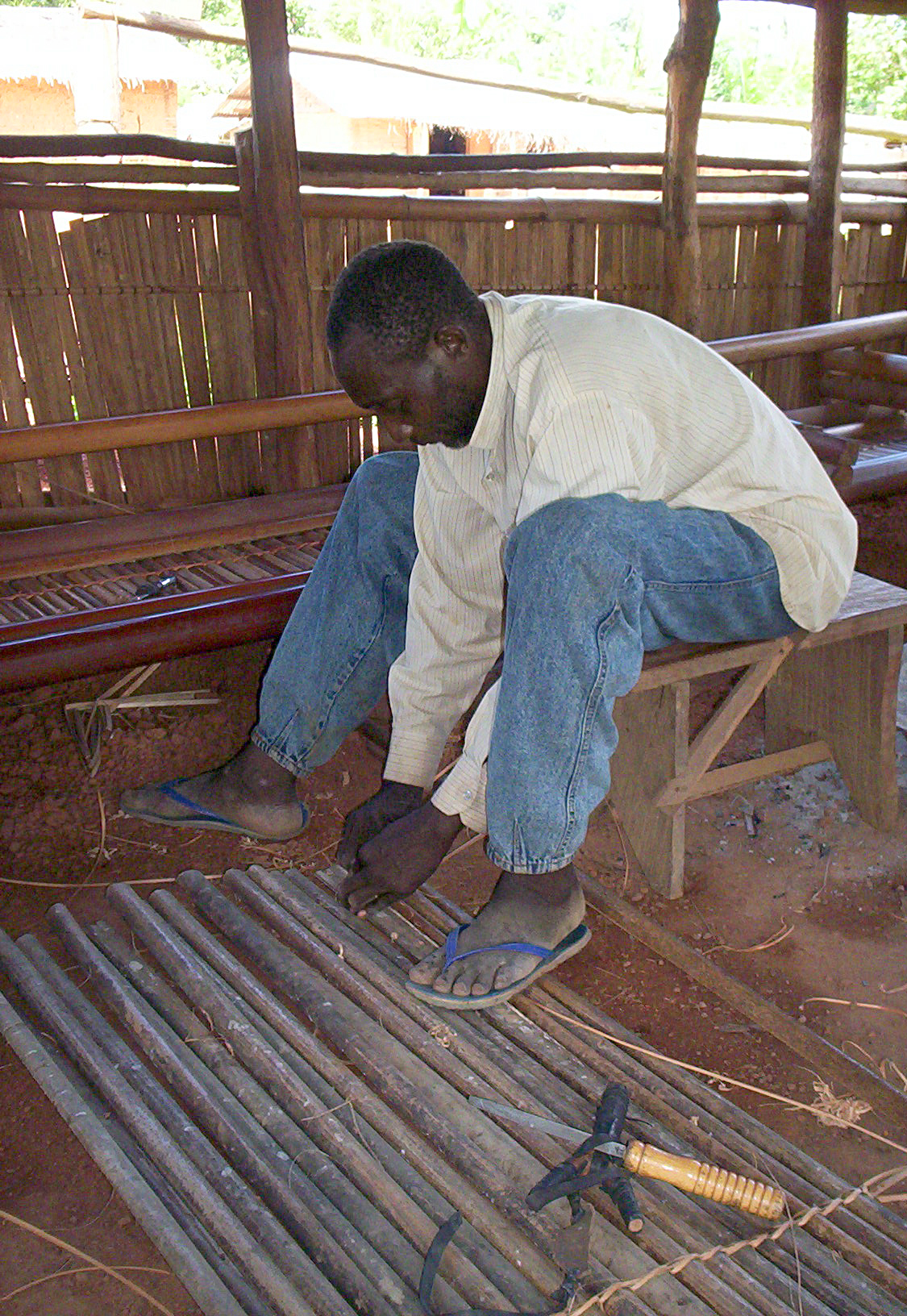
Njem man making shelf

Social organisation begins with the family, which consists of a man, his wife or wives, and his children. Several related families often live together to form a village. At the next level are several villages that claim common ancestry to form a clan. In the past, these clan identities were of the utmost importance, determining one's friends, lineage, and potential spouses. This clan identity is much weaker today, however. Each clan is headed by a chief, though the modern chiefs are little more than figureheads.

The vast majority of Njyem practice at least nominal Christianity. Vestiges of their native animism still persist, however, especially in the realm of traditional medicine. Folk superstitions also remain, such as belief in witchcraft.
