= Nzime people =

Bantu ethnic group

Nzime
Total population
- Total: Fewer than 30,000 (2000)

Regions with significant populations
- Cameroon

Languages
- Koonzime

Religion
- Christian

Related ethnic groups
- Badwe'e, Bekwel, Bekol, Benkonjo, Bomwali, Konabembe, Mabi, Maka, Mbimu, Mvumbo, Njyem, Sso

The Nzime are a Bantu ethnic group inhabiting the rain forest zone of southeastern Cameroon. The Nzime live along the road running south of Abong-Mbang, through Mindourou and Lomié, and forking to Zoulabot and Zwadiba. Their territory lies south of the Koonzime in Djaposten, east of the Badwe'e, north of the Njyem, and west of the Konabembe people, all related groups. The Nzime speak the Nzime dialect of Koonzime ("OZM"), one of the Makaa–Njyem Bantu languages.

== History ==
The Makaa–Njyem-speaking peoples entered present-day Cameroon from the Congo River basin or modern Chad between the 14th and 17th centuries. By the 19th century, they inhabited the lands north of the Lom River in the border region between the present-day East and Adamawa Provinces. Not long thereafter, however, the Beti-Pahuin peoples invaded these areas under pressure from the Vute and Mbum, themselves fleeing Fulani (Fula) warriors. The Makaa–Njyem speakers were forced south. Nzime groups continued south past the Nyong River and settled on the Dja.

== Lifestyle and settlement patterns ==
The majority of Nzime are subsistence farmers. Their settlements tend to follow existing roads, making the typical village a linear string of houses facing the road and backed by forest. Fields are typically very small, usually planted in clearings cut out of the forest with axes and machetes and then burned. Major crops include manioc, plantains, and maize, with bananas, cocoyams, groundnuts, and various fruits raised in smaller quantities. Livestock are typically small animals that may be left to roam unattended, such as goats, sheep, pigs, and chickens. A smaller number of Nzime have obtained financial success in the cocoa and coffee plantations of Cameroon's forest region.

Hunting is another common pursuit, especially in the smaller villages. Traps are the primary tool employed, though firearms are increasingly used today. Bushmeat caught in this way is becoming an important, if unsustainable, source of income for many people.

The Nzime groups share a codependent relationship with Cameroon's Baka pygmies. The Nzime trade manufactured goods and cultivated crops for pygmy-supplied forest game. In recent years, the Nzime have increasingly exploited their pygmy neighbours, however, both for cheap labour and as a sort of living tourist attraction.

The traditional Nzime house is a rectangular structure made of leaves folded over a raffia branch and pinned in place with a small twig. Alternately, strips of bark could be used for the sides. The A-shaped roof is covered in raffia palm leaves. Present-day houses are made of vertical poles with raffia strips lashed horizontally inside and out. Mud is packed between the poles and held in place by the raffia strips. The roofs continue to consist of thatches made of raffia palm leaves, although aluminium roofing is also being used when finances permit. Wealthier Nzime and those living in larger villages and towns often live in houses employing mud-blocks or concrete-blocks.

Social organisation begins with the family, which consists of a man, his wife or wives, and his children. Several related families often live together to form a village. At the next level are several villages that claim common ancestry to form a clan. In the past, these clan identities were of the utmost importance, determining one's friends, lineage, and potential spouses. This clan identity is much weaker today, however. Each clan is headed by a chief, though the modern chiefs are little more than figureheads.

The vast majority of Nzime practice at least nominal Christianity. Vestiges of their native animism still persist, however, especially in the realm of traditional medicine. Folk superstitions also remain, such as belief in witchcraft.

A New Testament in Nzime is in use both in print (since 1998) and in recorded form (since 2007).
