= Kako language =

Bantu language

Kako
- Native to: Cameroon, Central African Republic, Republic of Congo
- Native speakers: (ca. 120,000 cited 1996–2003)
- Language family: Niger–Congo?: Atlantic–Congo; Volta-Congo; Benue–Congo; Bantoid; Southern Bantoid; Bantu (Zone A); Makaa–Njem + Kako (A.80–90); Kako languages; Kako

Language codes
- ISO 639-3: kkj
- Glottolog: kako1242
- Guthrie code: A.93

Kako (also Mkako or Mkaka) is a Bantu language spoken mainly in Cameroon, with some speakers in the Central African Republic and the Republic of the Congo. The main population centres of Kako speakers are Batouri and Ndélélé in the East Region of Cameroon.

Once grouped with the Gbaya dialect cluster and often still referred to as part of an undefined "Gbaya-Kaka" group, Kako is now grouped in the Bantu language family.

== Dialects ==
Kako can be divided in three main, closely related dialects: eastern dialect (Bεra, Bèra) near the Cameroon-Central African Republic border area, middle dialect (Mgbwako, Mgbako) near the Batouri area, and western dialect (Mbo-Ndjo'o, Mbo-Ndjokou) near the Bertoua-Doumé area. The difference is greatest between the eastern Bεra dialect and the western Mbo-Ndjo'o, with the Mgbwako dialect forming a middle ground.

All three remain mutually intelligible. The Bεra and Mbondjóo dialects have 85.5% of their words in common, of which 26.4% are identical and 59.1% are cognates.

Other known variants of Kako language are Bo-Rong, Lossou, Ngwendjè and Mbéssembo. The Seki language in Gabon and Equatorial Guinea sounds very similar to Kako.

=== ALCAM (2012) ===
According to ALCAM (2012), each clan (in Kako mbó, equivalent to Beti mvog) has its own linguistic variety:

- Kakó Mbódo
- Kakó Mbóbutu
- Kakó Mbónjó
- Kakó Mbóngándi
- Kakó Mbóróng
- Kakó Ngónje
- Kakó Ngwájá
- Kako Ngbako
- Kakó Bera
- Kako Mbesámbó

The Kakó Mbesámbó and Kakó Bera found in the arrondissement of Lomié and in Ngoïla (Haut-Nyong department, Eastern Region) arrived there during the French colonial era to extract rubber. They are originally from the Ndélélé commune in the Kadey department, Eastern Region. Their language has not changed much since then.

Without having left Kadey south of Batouri, however, the Kakó Bóli, Loso, Mbópaló, and Gbe have abandoned the Kakó language and now speak Dóóka, a Gbaya language.

Kakó covers most of the Kadey department, notably most of the Batouri and Ndélélé communes and the north of Mbang (Doumé valley), while the south has Mpo speakers and Ketté commune has Gbaya speakers, who are also found in the east of Batouri and the south of Ndélélé.

Kakó is also found in the Central African Republic and the Republic of the Congo. The total population speaking this language is estimated at 70,500.

== History ==
Linguistic and documentary evidence support oral traditions claiming that the people speaking Kako, and thus the language, have migrated to their present positions from further east. Current evidence can trace the language back to the area just east of the current Cameroon-Central African Republic border, around the towns of Berberati and Gaza in the mid 19th century. Further extrapolation into history is speculative, though being a Bantu language it is likely to have followed the Bantu migrations out of their ancestral homeland in the southern Cameroon-Nigeria borderlands.

For their known history, the Kako language has been in close contact with various dialects of the Gbaya language. This has resulted in numerous borrowings of words. In fact, the Bεra dialect of Kako and the Yaáyuwee dialect of Kako share nearly 1% of their words, with a further 10-15% being cognates. A small group has migrated during last century in Gabon from Cameroon and has settled mainly around Batouri-Mbitam.

== Writing system ==
Kako is written with two standardized alphabets following the general alphabet of Cameroonian languages, one for East Kako and the other for west Kako.

East Kako Alphabet
| a | b | ɓ | c | d | ɗ | e | ɛ | f | g | h | i | j | k | l | m | n | ŋ | o | ɔ | p | r | s | t | u | v | w | y |

West Kako Alphabet
| a | b | ɓ | c | d | ɗ | e | ɛ | f | g | h | i | j | k | l | m | n | ŋ | o | ɔ | p | r | s | t | u | v | w | y | z |

Nasalized vowels are indicated using the cedilla: ⟨a̧ ɛ̧ i̧ o̧ u̧⟩ for East Kako and ⟨a̧ i̧ u̧⟩ for West Kako.

Tones are usually not indicated, lexical tone never is, but grammatical tone can be indicated with accents when there is ambiguity.
