= Michel Ange Angouing =

Cameroonian politician (born 1959)

Technical Adviser at the Ministry of Justice
- Incumbent
- Assumed office 2020
- President: Paul Biya
- Prime Minister: Joseph Ngute

Minister of Public Service and Administrative Reform
- In office 2011–2018
- Prime Minister: Philémon Yang

Personal details
- Born: 9 February 1959 (age 67) Abong-Mbang, Haut-Nyong
- Party: CPDM
- Education: University of Yaoundé I
- Profession: Magistrate
- Awards: Order of Valour

Michel Ange Angouing is a Cameroonian politician. From 2011 to 2018, he was Minister of Public Service and Administrative Reform in the Philemon Yang government. He is presently a technical adviser at the Ministry of Justice.

== Biography ==
=== Childhood ===
Ange Michel Angouing was born on 9 February 1959, in Abong-Mbang, in the Haut-Nyong department, more precisely in the district of Doumaintang, a region in eastern Cameroon.

=== Education ===
He obtained his A4 literary baccalaureate in Spanish series in 1978, at the Bertoua high school. He then went to the capital, Yaoundé to continue his university studies. He obtained a degree in law at the University of Yaoundé I.

=== Career ===
His career is rooted in public administration, justice, and legal reform. He began his professional career in the North region, at the Garoua High Court, a position he combined with that of vice-president of the military court of the same region. During the period from 1989 to 2001, he worked in turn as public prosecutor at the courts of first and high instance in several cities of his country (Dschang, Nkongsamba, and Douala). He is trained as a magistrate, eventually rising to the rank of Magistrat hors hiérarchie, one of the highest distinctions in Cameroon's judicial corps.

After leaving MINFOPRA, Angouing continued to serve as a Technical Adviser at the Ministry of Justice (Minjustice), a senior voice in legal and political commentary, especially on National cohesion, Democratic memory, Political ethics, and Post‑1990 political evolution in Cameroon.

Angouing has published several public reflections in Cameroonian media, with two of them standing out being "Peace, tolerance, and political ethics", and "Memory of the 1990–1992 “Years of Fire”". These writings position him as a guardian of institutional memory and a moderate voice in political discourse.

== Politics ==
He is a member of the CPDM and was formerly part of the Haut-Nyong department. He is a politician and key speaker in the strengthening of Cameroonian democracy.
