= Mpumpong language =

Bantu language of Cameroon

Mpumpong
- Mpumpoŋ
- Pronunciation: [pʰùpʰôŋ]
- Native to: Cameroon
- Native speakers: (75,000, incl. Konabem cited 1991–1996)
- Language family: Niger–Congo?: Atlantic–Congo; Benue–Congo; Bantu (Zone A); Makaa–Njem + Kako (A.80–90); Ndzem–Bomwali; Bekwilic; Mpumpong
- Dialects: Mezime (Medjime); Mpiemo; Mpumpong

Language codes
- ISO 639-3: Either: mgg – Mpumpong mcx – Mpiemo
- Glottolog: mpon1254 Mpongmpong mpie1238 Mpiemo
- Guthrie code: A.86

Mpumpong (Mpongmpong) is a Bantu language of Cameroon. Maho (2009) considers Mpiemo to be a dialect.

The digraph ⟨mp⟩ is pronounced like an English p.

== Varieties ==
Varieties of Mpo are Mezime, Mpobyáng, Mpopó, Bagéto, Kunabeeb, Mpyámó, Mpomam, Esel, and Bijugi. There is intermediate intercomprehension among these language varieties. Mpo is closely related to Nzime.

According to certain Mpobyáng speakers, notably from the villages of Mpak and Zumzazó in the arrondissement of Abong-Mbang, department of Haut-Nyong, Eastern Region, Mpo is the eponymous ancestor of the various Mezime clans:

- Byon (commune of Abong-Mbang, Haut-Nyong department, Eastern Region)
- Mpopyeet (commune of Mbang, Kadey department)
- Mpopó (commune of Yokadouma, department of Boumba-et-Ngoko, Eastern Region)
- Kunabeeb (commune of Yokadouma, department of Boumba-et-Ngoko, Eastern Region)
- Mpyámo (commune of Yokadouma, department of Boumba-et-Ngoko, Eastern Region)
- Mpomam (communes of Lomié and Ngoïla, department of Haut-Nyong, Eastern Region)

Each clan bears the name of one of the eight sons of Mpo; Esál and Bijugi would have appeared later in the genealogy.

Mpo occupies much of the southeastern corner of Cameroon, i.e. most of Boumba-et-Ngoko department and the southern edge of Kadey department. Mezime (Medjime) and Bagéto (Bangantou) live in the southern part of Mbang commune (department of Kadey), respectively to the west and east of the main town of Mbang.

All other groups live in the department of Boumba-et-Ngoko (Eastern Region):

- The Mpyámo (Mbimou) live in the commune of Gari-Gombo along the road from Gribi to Yokadouma.
- The Mpopó (Mbombo) live to the west and immediately south of the main town of Yokadouma.
- The Bijugi (Bidjouki) live to the east of the main town of Yokadouma.
- The Kunabeeb (Konabembé) live to the south of the main town of Yokadouma.

In the commune of Moloundou, there are the Mpomam (Boman) to the north, the Esál (Essel) to the east along the Ngoko River, and the Kunabeeb to the west along the Dja River. The local government administration has sometimes confused the name "Bangantou" with the Mpo-speaking Bageto (in the commune of Mbang) together with the Ubangian-speaking Bangandu living north of Moloundou.

The Mpo population is estimated at 45,000 speakers.
