= Dwe'e =

Dwe'e may refer to:

- Dwe'e people, an ethnic group of southeastern Cameroon
- Dwe'e language, the language of the Dwe'e and Nzime people
