= So language =

So language may refer to

- So language (Democratic Republic of Congo), a Bantu language
- Sô language, a Katuic language (Mon-Khmer) of Laos and Thailand
- Swo language, a Bantu language of Cameroon
- Soo language, a Kuliak language of Uganda

== See also ==
- So people (disambiguation)
