= Atok =

Atok may refer to:

- ATOK software
- Atok, Benguet
- Atok, Cameroon
- Atok barangay in Flora, Apayao
