= BMW (disambiguation) =

BMW is a German automobile manufacturer.

BMW may also refer to:

- "BMW", a 2022 song by Bad Boy Chiller Crew
- Bea Millan-Windorski (born 2002), Filipina-American beauty pageant titleholder
- Best Man Wins, a 1948 film
- Biodegradable municipal waste
- Bomwali language's ISO language code
- Boy Meets World, an American television series
- H E Tancred Stakes, an Australian horse race formerly known as "The BMW"
- Black Myth: Wukong, A 2024 video game
