= Dwe'e people =

Ethnic group of southeastern Cameroon

Badwe'e
Total population
- Total: Fewer than 30,000 (2000)

Regions with significant populations
- Cameroon

Languages
- Koozime

Religion
- Christian

Related ethnic groups
- Bekwel, Bekol, Benkonjo, Bomwali, Konabembe, Maka, Mpyemo ("Mbimu"), Mabi and Mvumbo, Njem, Nzime, Sso

The Badwe'e (also Bajwe'e; French Badjoué) are an ethnic group inhabiting the rain forest zone of southeastern Cameroon. They recognize themselves as the descendants of Edwe'e, the youngest son of Koo and the brother of Njeme and Nzime. The Badwe'e live south of Messaména in the East Province in a region south of the Bekol and both north and west of the Nzime. Their territory includes much of the northern and western border of the Dja Biosphere Reserve. They speak a dialect of Koozime, together with the Nzime.

== History ==
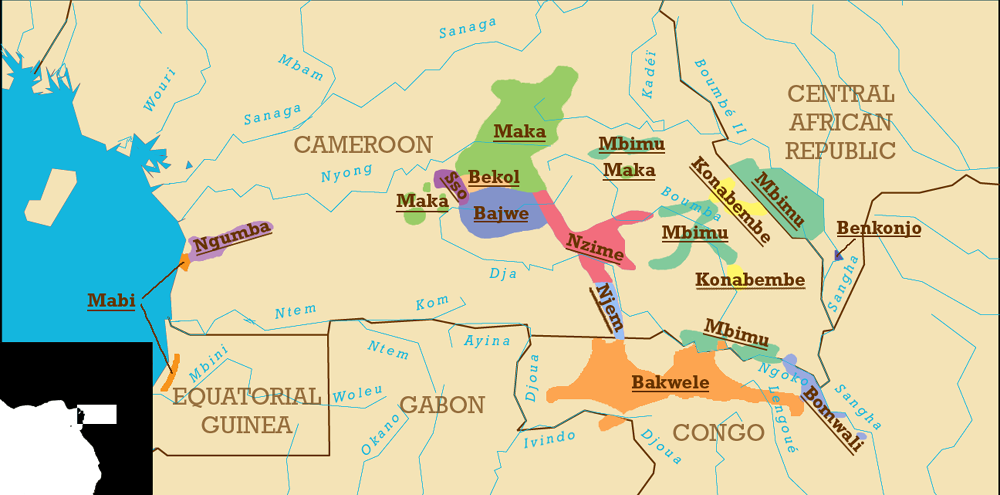
Speakers of Makaa–Njem languages in Cameroon and neighbouring countries.

The ancestors of the Badwe'e lived in the Congo River basin or the present territory of Chad before moving into the present territory of Cameroon between the 14th and 17th centuries. Along with the other speakers of Makaa–Njyem languages, they lived along the northern Lom River near the present-day border between the Adamawa and East provinces. Under pressure from migrating Beti-Pahuin groups (themselves fleeing the Vute and Mbum), the Makaa–Njem-speaking groups moved farther south. The Badwe'e eventually settled south of the Bekol and west of the Nzime. During the colonial period, they created villages to the north of the Nzime, beginning at Djaposten and extending to Mindourou. This was to assist them to receive medical treatment against sleeping sickness.

== Lifestyle and settlement patterns ==
Most Badwe'e live as subsistence farmers and live in linear villages oriented toward the roads through their region. They grow crops such as manioc, plantains, and maize, as well as smaller amounts of bananas, cocoyams, groundnuts, and fruits. Small livestock that does not require much care forms another part of the diet. Other Bajwe hunt with traps or, more commonly today, firearms. The resulting bushmeat has become an important source of income for some people. Most Badwe'e profess Christianity as their faith. A New Testament in Badwe'e is in use.

Over 60 Badwe'e villages border the Dja Biosphere Reserve. Most of these are relatively small, with fewer than 113 inhabitants.
