= Valerie Neim =

Valérie Neim
- Born: Cameroon
- Citizenship: Cameroonian
- Education: London South Bank University; Oxford Brookes University
- Occupations: Businesswoman, banker, corporate advisor
- Years active: 2000s–present
- Organisation(s): Brazza Transactions, INVICTAE
- Known for: Wealth management, female entrepreneurship
- Title: Founder and CEO of Brazza Transactions

Valérie Neim is a Cameroonian businesswoman, banker, wealth management expert and corporate advisor. She is the founder and CEO of Brazza Transactions, a Cameroon-based corporate consulting and wealth management firm.

Brazza operates across Francophone Africa and the Central African Economic and Monetary Community (CEMAC) region. The company was established to address the lack of local wealth management services for high-net-worth individuals in Francophone Africa, who previously relied on European and American firms.

Neim is also the founder of INVICTAE, an international network designed to facilitate investment and female industrial leadership across the African continent. In 2023, she was appointed to the leadership of the Jeune Afrique "Women Working For Change" (WFC) initiative.

== Early life and education ==
Neim was born and raised in Cameroon, where she completed her primary and secondary education. At 18 she moved to the United Kingdom to pursue higher education. She attended London South Bank University, where she earned a Bachelor of Arts in Business Administration followed by a Master of Science in Information Systems Management. She later completed her business training by obtaining a Master of Business Administration (MBA) in Entrepreneurship from Oxford Brookes University.

== Career ==
Following her studies, Neim worked at ABSA Bank (Santander Bank), and subsequently joined Fujitsu-Siemens, then worked as a Consultant for the German company, TNT Logistics.

=== Return to Africa and banking career (2009–2011) ===
In 2009, Neim returned to Africa under the mentorship of Ivorian banker Jean-Luc Konan, who was serving as a director for United Bank for Africa (UBA). Following their interview, she joined the United Bank for Africa group as a Prestige Senior Manager and Key Accounts Manager for Gabon and Nigeria, where she was responsible for managing the accounts of ministers, decision-makers, and ambassadors within the Central African region until 2011.

In September 2011, Neim returned to Cameroon to take over as the managing director of CCPC Finance (Crédit coopératif participatif du Cameroun), her family's microfinance institution. During her eight-year tenure, she oversaw an operational turnaround by implementing structural adjustments with a focusing on female leadership and recruiting primarily women. By 2017, the workforce transitioned to a 90% female composition. Over a five-year development period, the company's permanent staff expanded from 30 to 150 employees (alongside roughly fifty temporary workers), its financial capital grew from 100 million to 1 billion Central African CFA franc (FCFA), and overall corporate turnover increased by 200%.

In June 2019, Neim stepped down to launch Brazza Transactions. Based in Douala, the firm operated as the first entity in Cameroon specializing in wealth management for high-net-worth individuals (HNWIs).

In January 2021, she established INVICTAE, an international female impact club and network. The organization was structured to connect African female industrial leaders and corporate captains with global capital networks, utilizing collective intelligence to attract international investors and narrow the regional investment gap.

== Advocacy and public engagement ==
Neim is an active member of the European Chamber of Commerce (EUROCHAM) and served as an international speaker on economic development. In late 2023, she participated as a leading panelist at the Africa Financial Industry Summit (AFIS), where she publicly advocated for green financing mechanisms and microfinance adjustments to better support small and medium-sized enterprises (SMEs) across Africa.

In May 2023, acting as an alumnus of the International Visitor Leadership Program (IVLP), Neim partnered with the United States Embassy in Yaoundé to launch the Academy for Women Entrepreneurs (AWE) program in Cameroon, providing mentorship to local business owners.

== Recognition ==
- 100 Most Inspiring Black Women – Awarded by the Association Femmes Inspirantes (2023) in recognition of her corporate leadership and impact in the African financial sector.
