= Haut-Nyong =

Department of East Province, Cameroon

Coordinates: 4°00′N 13°10′E

- Department
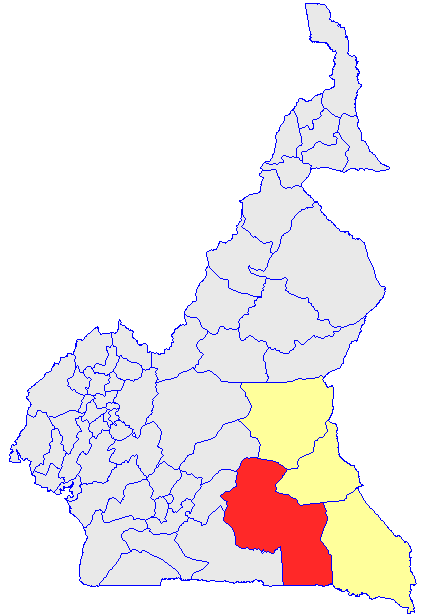
- Department location in Cameroon

- Location within Cameroon Location within Africa
- Country: Cameroon
- Province: East Province
- Capital: Abong-Mbang

Area
  - Total: 36,384 km^{2} (14,048 sq mi)

Population (2001)
  - Total: 216,768
  - Density: 5.9578/km^{2} (15.431/sq mi)
- Time zone: UTC+1 (WAT)

Haut-Nyong is a department of East Province in Cameroon. The department covers an area of 36,384 km^{2} and as of 2001 had a total population of 216,768. The capital of the department lies at Abong-Mbang.

== Subdivisions ==
The department is divided administratively into 14 communes and in turn into villages.

=== Communes ===
- Abong-Mbang
- Angossas
- Atok
- Dimako
- Doumaintang
- Doumé
- Lomié
- Mboma
- Messamena
- Messok
- Mindourou
- Ngoyla
- Nguelemendouka
- Somalomo
