= So people =

So people may refer to:

- the Asho tribe of Burma and Bangladesh
- the people of the Sao civilisation of Africa
- So people of Laos

== See also ==
- So language (disambiguation)
