= Angossas =

- Commune and town
- Location in Cameroon
- Coordinates: 4°05′N 12°59′E
- Country: Cameroon
- Region: East
- Department: Haut-Nyong
- Time zone: UTC+1 (WAT)

Angossas is a town and commune in Cameroon.

== See also ==
- Communes of Cameroon
