= Demographics of Cameroon =

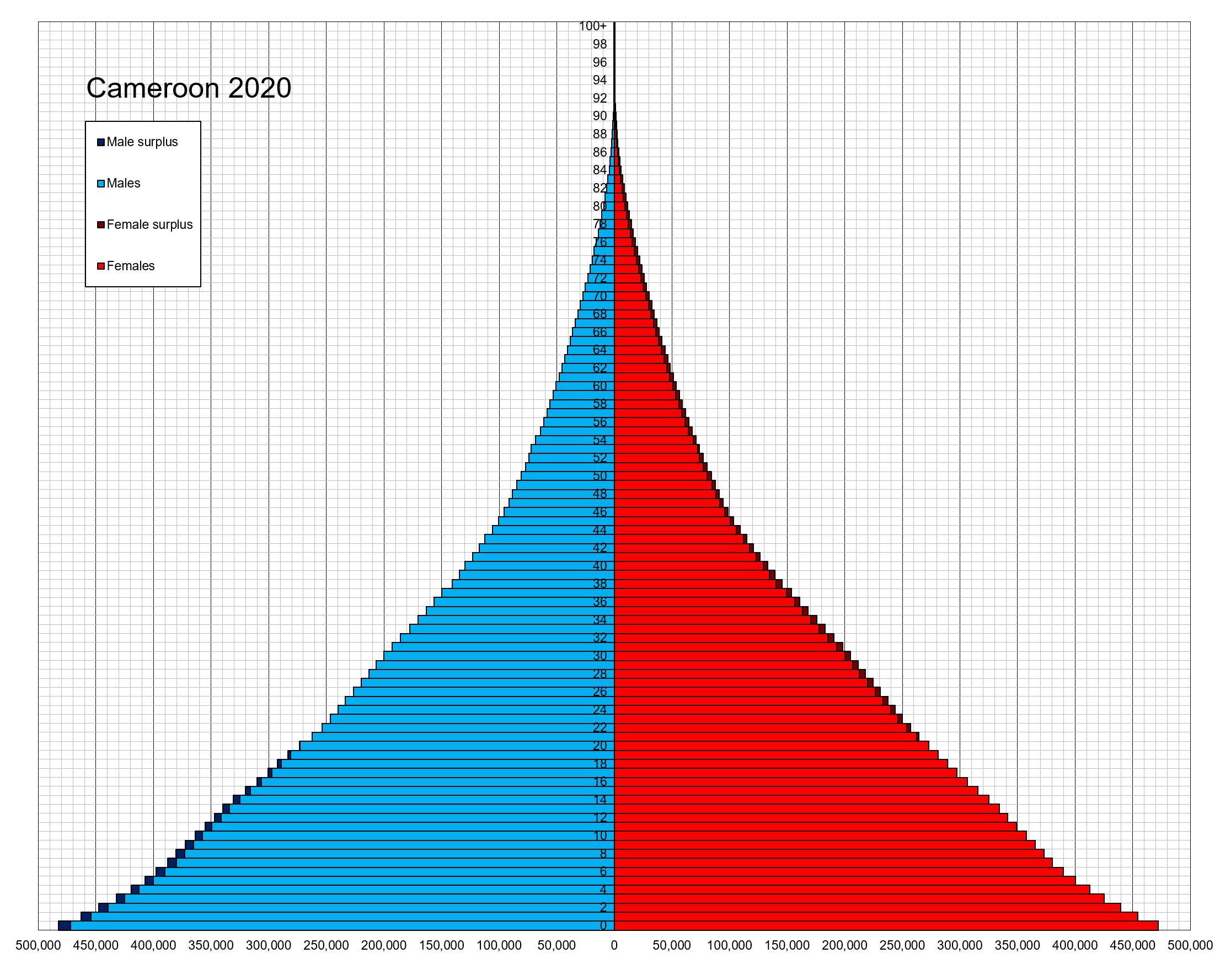
- Population pyramid of Cameroon in 2020
- Population: 29,321,637 (2022 est.)
- Growth rate: 2.75% (2022 est.)
- Birth rate: 35.53 births/1,000 population (2022 est.)
- Death rate: 7.73 deaths/1,000 population (2022 est.)
- Life expectancy: 63.27 years
  - male: 61.49 years
  - female: 65.09 years
- Fertility rate: 4.55 children born/woman (2022 est.)
- Infant mortality: 48.73 deaths/1,000 live births
- Net migration rate: -0.31 migrant(s)/1,000 population (2022 est.)

Age structure
- 0–14 years: 42.34%
- 65 and over: 3.11%

Sex ratio
- Total: 0.99 male(s)/female (2022 est.)
- At birth: 1.03 male(s)/female
- Under 15: 1.02 male(s)/female
- 65 and over: 0.74 male(s)/female

Nationality
- Nationality: Cameroonian

Language
- Official: English, French

The demographic profile of Cameroon is complex for a country of its population. Cameroon comprises an estimated 250 distinct ethnic groups, which may be formed into five large regional-cultural divisions:

- western highlanders (Semi-Bantu or grassfielders), including the Bamileke, Bamum (or Bamoun), and many smaller Tikar groups in the Northwest (est. 38% of total population);
- coastal tropical forest peoples, including the Bassa, Duala (or Douala), and many smaller groups in the Southwest (12%);
- southern tropical forest peoples, including the Beti-Pahuin, Bulu (a subgroup of Beti-Pahuin), Fang (subgroup of Beti-Pahuin), Maka, Njem, and Baka pygmies (18%);
- predominantly Islamic peoples of the northern semi-arid regions (the Sahel) and central highlands, including the Fulani (French: Peul or Peuhl; Fula: Fulɓe) (14%); and
- the "Kirdi", non-Islamic or recently Islamic peoples of the northern desert and central highlands (18%).

The Cameroon government held two national censuses during the country's first 44 years as an independent country, in 1976 and again in 1987. Results from the second head count were never published. A third census, expected to take years to produce results, began on November 11, 2005, with a three-week interviewing phase. It is one of a series of projects and reforms required by the International Monetary Fund as prerequisites for foreign debt relief. The first results were published in 2010.

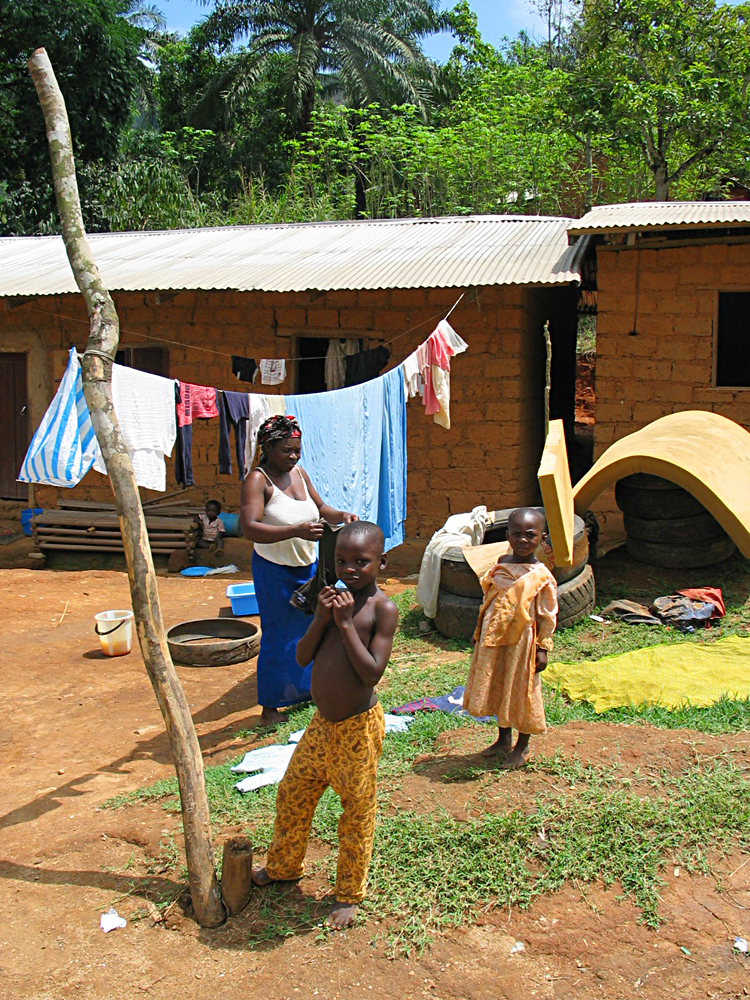
A Tikar family in the Northwest Province

== Population ==
Population, fertility rate and net reproduction rate, United Nations estimates

According to the 2022 revision of the World Population Prospects the total population was 27,198,628 in 2021, compared to only 4 466 000 in 1950. The proportion of children below the age of 15 in 2010 was 40.6%, 55.9% was between 15 and 65 years of age, while 3.5% was 65 years or older.

	Total population	Population aged 0–14 (%)	Population aged 15–64 (%)	Population aged 65+ (%)
1950	4 466 000	39.6	56.9	3.5
1955	4 901 000	40.1	56.4	3.5
1960	5 409 000	40.6	55.9	3.6
1965	6 049 000	41.5	54.9	3.6
1970	6 842 000	42.4	54.0	3.6
1975	7 838 000	43.6	52.7	3.7
1980	9 110 000	44.6	51.8	3.6
1985	10 519 000	45.2	51.2	3.6
1990	12 181 000	45.2	51.3	3.6
1995	13 940 000	44.4	52.1	3.5
2000	15 678 000	42.8	53.7	3.5
2005	17 554 000	41.6	54.9	3.5
2010	19 599 000	40.6	55.9	3.5

Population Estimates by Sex and Age Group (01.I.2010) (Data refer to national projections.):

Age group	Male	Female	Total	%
Total	9 599 224	9 806 876	19 406 100	100
0–4	1 662 298	1 624 936	3 287 234	16.94
5–9	1 412 467	1 370 992	2 783 459	14.34
10–14	1 227 470	1 167 201	2 394 671	12.34
15–19	1 068 509	1 101 526	2 170 035	11.18
20–24	855 334	981 955	1 837 289	9.47
25–29	712 550	813 266	1 525 816	7.86
30–34	588 210	621 397	1 209 607	6.23
35–39	460 394	482 319	942 713	4.86
40–44	388 539	405 307	793 846	4.09
45–49	323 507	316 740	640 247	3.30
50–54	261 626	260 284	521 910	2.69
55–59	178 876	159 112	337 988	1.74
60–64	155 208	160 671	315 879	1.63
65–69	110 645	116 645	227 290	1.17
70–74	88 969	100 602	189 571	0.98
75–79	47 173	50 905	98 078	0.51
80–84	31 609	39 976	71 585	0.37
85–89	12 109	14 455	26 564	0.14
90–94	6 942	8 773	15 715	0.08
95+	6 789	9 814	16 603	0.09
Age group	Male	Female	Total	Percent
0–14	4 302 235	4 163 129	8 465 364	43.62
15–64	4 992 753	5 302 577	10 295 330	53.05
65+	304 236	341 170	645 406	3.33

Population Estimates by Sex and Age Group (01.VII.2019) (Source: Population projections and estimates of priority targets for the various health programs and interventions, National Institute of Statistics (2016).):

Age group	Male	Female	Total	%
Total	12 609 256	12 883 098	25 492 354	100
0–4	1 904 057	1 975 656	3 879 713	15.22
5–9	1 720 605	1 757 707	3 478 312	13.64
10–14	1 574 388	1 524 415	3 098 803	12.16
15–19	1 386 436	1 346 672	2 733 108	10.72
20–24	1 213 959	1 171 500	2 385 459	9.36
25–29	1 035 624	985 314	2 020 938	7.93
30–34	888 422	967 529	1 855 951	7.28
35–39	684 460	786 728	1 471 188	5.77
40–44	584 695	650 891	1 235 586	4.85
45–49	438 096	447 171	885 267	3.47
50–54	352 927	392 864	745 791	2.93
55–59	275 690	281 896	557 586	2.19
60–64	220 891	242 450	463 341	1.82
65–69	143 542	141 522	285 064	1.12
70–74	101 474	110 948	212 422	0.83
75–79	49 486	55 219	104 705	0.41
80+	34 504	44 616	79 120	0.31
Age group	Male	Female	Total	Percent
0–14	5 199 050	5 257 778	10 456 828	41.02
15–64	7 130 686	7 273 015	14 403 701	56.50
65+	279 520	352 305	631 825	2.48

=== Fertility ===
Total Fertility Rate (TFR) (Wanted Fertility Rate) and Crude Birth Rate (CBR):

Year	CBR (Total)	TFR (Total)	CBR (Urban)	TFR (Urban)	CBR (Rural)	TFR (Rural)
1991	39	5.82 (5.17)		5.17 (4.52)		6.29 (5.66)
1998	37.4	5.2 (4.6)	31.5	3.9 (3.4)	40.1	5.8 (5.3)
2004	37.8	5.0 (4.5)	34.9	4.0 (3.7)	40.5	6.1 (5.6)
2011	38.1	5.1 (4.5)	34.6	4.0	41.3	6.4
2018	36.8	4.8 (4.3)	32.9	3.8 (3.4)	40.7	6.0 (5.5)

Fertility data as of 2011 (DHS Program):

Region	Total fertility rate	Percentage of women age 15–49 currently pregnant	Mean number of children ever born to women age 40–49
Adamaoua	5.2	8.6	6.5
Centre (except Yaoundé)	5.6	8.8	5.5
Douala	3.2	8.1	4.5
Est	5.4	12.0	5.6
Extrême-Nord	6.8	14.8	7.3
Littoral (except Douala)	4.6	8.4	5.1
Nord	6.5	12.4	7.1
Nord-Ouest	4.4	6.9	5.4
Ouest	6.0	10.1	5.8
Sud	4.6	9.6	5.2
Sud-Ouest	4.0	7.6	5.5
Yaoundé	3.5	6.5	4.4

Years	1925	1926	1927	1928	1929	1930	1931	1932	1933	1934
Total Fertility Rate in Cameroon	5.54	5.54	5.54	5.54	5.54	5.54	5.54	5.54	5.54	5.54

Years	1935	1936	1937	1938	1939	1940	1941	1942	1943	1944
Total Fertility Rate in Cameroon	5.54	5.54	5.54	5.54	5.54	5.54	5.54	5.54	5.54	5.54

Years	1945	1946	1947	1948	1949
Total Fertility Rate in Cameroon	5.54	5.54	5.54	5.54	5.54

== Vital statistics ==
Registration of vital events is in Cameroon not complete. The Population Departement of the United Nations prepared the following estimates.

Year	Mid-year population	Live births	Deaths per	Natural change	CBR*	CDR*	NC*	IMR*	TFR*	Life expectancy (years)
1950	4,316,000	187,000	121,000	66,000	43.2	28.1	15.2	194.2	5.54	34.46
1951	4,382,000	189,000	122,000	67,000	43.2	27.9	15.2	193.1	5.52	34.64
1952	4,450,000	192,000	123,000	68,000	43.0	27.7	15.4	190.9	5.49	35.01
1953	4,519,000	194,000	123,000	71,000	43.0	27.3	15.6	188.5	5.47	35.43
1954	4,592,000	197,000	122,000	76,000	42.9	26.5	16.5	182.7	5.47	36.42
1955	4,671,000	201,000	120,000	81,000	43.0	25.7	17.3	177.3	5.47	37.36
1956	4,754,000	205,000	119,000	86,000	43.1	25.0	18.1	172.0	5.49	38.35
1957	4,841,000	209,000	122,000	88,000	43.3	25.1	18.2	167.0	5.51	38.26
1958	4,932,000	214,000	121,000	94,000	43.5	24.5	19.0	162.4	5.55	39.10
1959	5,028,000	220,000	121,000	99,000	43.7	24.0	19.8	158.3	5.59	39.84
1960	5,118,000	226,000	147,000	80,000	44.2	28.6	15.5	154.8	5.65	34.82
1961	5,200,000	232,000	146,000	86,000	44.7	28.2	16.5	151.9	5.71	35.41
1962	5,304,000	239,000	118,000	121,000	45.1	22.3	22.8	149.6	5.77	42.52
1963	5,428,000	246,000	120,000	126,000	45.3	22.0	23.3	147.5	5.83	42.92
1964	5,556,000	252,000	121,000	131,000	45.4	21.8	23.6	145.3	5.89	43.31
1965	5,690,000	258,000	122,000	137,000	45.4	21.4	24.0	142.7	5.95	43.89
1966	5,830,000	265,000	122,000	142,000	45.4	21.0	24.4	139.6	6.00	44.44
1967	5,975,000	271,000	122,000	149,000	45.3	20.4	24.9	135.8	6.06	45.18
1968	6,127,000	277,000	121,000	156,000	45.2	19.8	25.4	131.7	6.11	45.98
1969	6,286,000	283,000	121,000	163,000	45.1	19.2	25.9	127.5	6.14	46.82
1970	6,453,000	291,000	120,000	171,000	45.1	18.6	26.5	123.4	6.20	47.58
1971	6,627,000	299,000	120,000	179,000	45.1	18.1	27.0	119.9	6.26	48.25
1972	6,809,000	306,000	120,000	186,000	45.0	17.6	27.3	117.0	6.28	48.90
1973	6,999,000	315,000	121,000	193,000	44.9	17.3	27.6	115.0	6.31	49.32
1974	7,195,000	323,000	123,000	200,000	44.9	17.1	27.7	113.8	6.34	49.57
1975	7,397,000	332,000	126,000	206,000	44.9	17.0	27.9	113.1	6.39	49.72
1976	7,598,000	344,000	129,000	215,000	45.2	16.9	28.3	112.6	6.45	49.88
1977	7,797,000	355,000	132,000	223,000	45.4	16.9	28.6	111.9	6.52	50.00
1978	8,013,000	365,000	134,000	232,000	45.6	16.7	28.9	110.9	6.56	50.28
1979	8,243,000	378,000	136,000	242,000	45.8	16.5	29.3	109.4	6.61	50.58
1980	8,520,000	390,000	137,000	253,000	45.9	16.2	29.8	107.3	6.66	51.04
1981	8,829,000	407,000	139,000	267,000	46.1	15.8	30.3	104.6	6.64	51.52
1982	9,047,000	421,000	141,000	281,000	46.2	15.4	30.8	101.6	6.62	52.09
1983	9,241,000	422,000	138,000	284,000	45.6	14.9	30.7	98.3	6.61	52.76
1984	9,509,000	431,000	138,000	293,000	45.3	14.5	30.8	95.1	6.59	53.22
1985	9,804,000	444,000	138,000	306,000	45.2	14.0	31.2	92.0	6.58	53.90
1986	10,113,000	459,000	140,000	318,000	45.3	13.9	31.5	89.6	6.59	54.04
1987	10,434,000	471,000	140,000	332,000	45.2	13.4	31.8	87.2	6.56	54.72
1988	10,760,000	482,000	142,000	340,000	44.7	13.2	31.5	85.9	6.50	54.93
1989	11,089,000	492,000	145,000	347,000	44.4	13.1	31.3	85.3	6.44	54.95
1990	11,431,000	505,000	150,000	355,000	44.1	13.1	31.0	85.5	6.39	54.87
1991	11,778,000	517,000	155,000	362,000	43.9	13.2	30.7	86.3	6.35	54.66
1992	12,129,000	528,000	160,000	368,000	43.5	13.2	30.3	87.4	6.29	54.48
1993	12,487,000	538,000	167,000	372,000	43.1	13.4	29.7	88.7	6.19	54.06
1994	12,849,000	549,000	174,000	374,000	42.7	13.6	29.1	89.9	6.08	53.53
1995	13,212,000	556,000	180,000	376,000	42.1	13.6	28.5	90.7	5.96	53.22
1996	13,575,000	564,000	187,000	377,000	41.5	13.8	27.7	91.4	5.83	52.82
1997	13,941,000	573,000	191,000	382,000	41.1	13.7	27.4	91.6	5.72	52.74
1998	14,315,000	588,000	197,000	391,000	41.1	13.7	27.3	91.5	5.67	52.58
1999	14,699,000	607,000	200,000	407,000	41.3	13.6	27.7	90.6	5.63	52.70
2000	15,092,000	620,000	203,000	417,000	41.0	13.4	27.6	89.4	5.53	52.93
2001	15,493,000	632,000	205,000	427,000	40.8	13.2	27.5	87.9	5.44	53.14
2002	15,914,000	652,000	208,000	445,000	41.0	13.0	27.9	86.1	5.46	53.42
2003	16,354,000	674,000	209,000	465,000	41.2	12.8	28.4	84.3	5.46	53.88
2004	16,809,000	694,000	211,000	483,000	41.3	12.6	28.7	82.5	5.45	54.18
2005	17,275,000	711,000	215,000	496,000	41.1	12.4	28.7	80.8	5.41	54.36
2006	17,751,000	728,000	215,000	513,000	41.0	12.1	28.9	79.1	5.35	54.86
2007	18,252,000	745,000	217,000	528,000	40.8	11.9	28.9	77.4	5.33	55.17
2008	18,777,000	762,000	218,000	544,000	40.6	11.6	29.0	75.5	5.28	55.66
2009	19,319,000	779,000	218,000	561,000	40.3	11.3	29.0	73.7	5.23	56.10
2010	19,878,000	795,000	219,000	576,000	40.0	11.0	29.0	71.4	5.16	56.58
2011	20,449,000	805,000	218,000	588,000	39.4	10.6	28.7	69.1	5.06	57.13
2012	21,033,000	815,000	215,000	600,000	38.8	10.2	28.5	66.6	4.99	57.79
2013	21,633,000	827,000	213,000	615,000	38.2	9.8	28.4	64.0	4.91	58.48
2014	22,300,000	842,000	212,000	629,000	37.8	9.5	28.3	61.6	4.86	58.94
2015	23,013,000	869,000	211,000	658,000	37.8	9.2	28.6	59.1	4.83	59.66
2016	23,712,000	895,000	211,000	684,000	37.7	8.9	28.9	56.9	4.82	60.23
2017	24,393,000	913,000	210,000	703,000	37.4	8.6	28.8	54.8	4.77	60.81
2018	25,077,000	921,000	210,000	711,000	36.7	8.4	28.3	55.0	4.69	61.18
2019	25,506,000	923,000	208,000	715,000	36.2	8.2	28.0	53.3	4.65	61.7
2020	26,211,000	929,000	212,000	716,000	35.4	8.1	27.3	51.8	4.56	61.7
2021	26,916,000	936,000	222,000	714,000	34.8	8.3	26.5	50.3	4.47	61.1
2022	27,633,000	947,000	212,000	735,000	34.3	7.7	26.6	48.8	4.40	62.4
2023	28,373,000	957,000	203,000	755,000	33.7	7.2	26.6	47.4	4.32	63.7
* CBR = crude birth rate (per 1,000); CDR = crude death rate (per 1,000); NC = natural change (per 1,000); IMR = infant mortality rate per 1,000 births; TFR = total fertility rate (number of children per woman)

View source data.
View source data.
View source data.
View source data.

== Ethnic groups ==
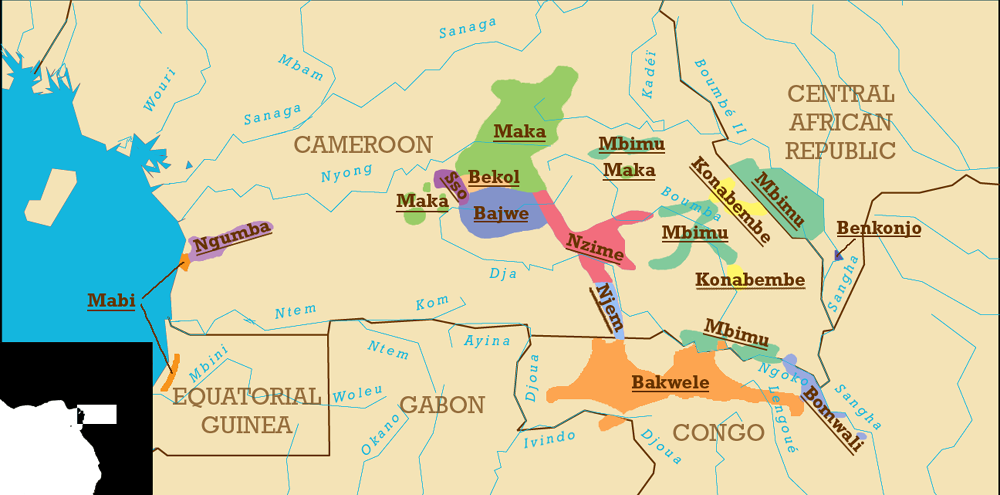
Speakers of Makaa–Njem languages in Cameroon and neighbouring countries.

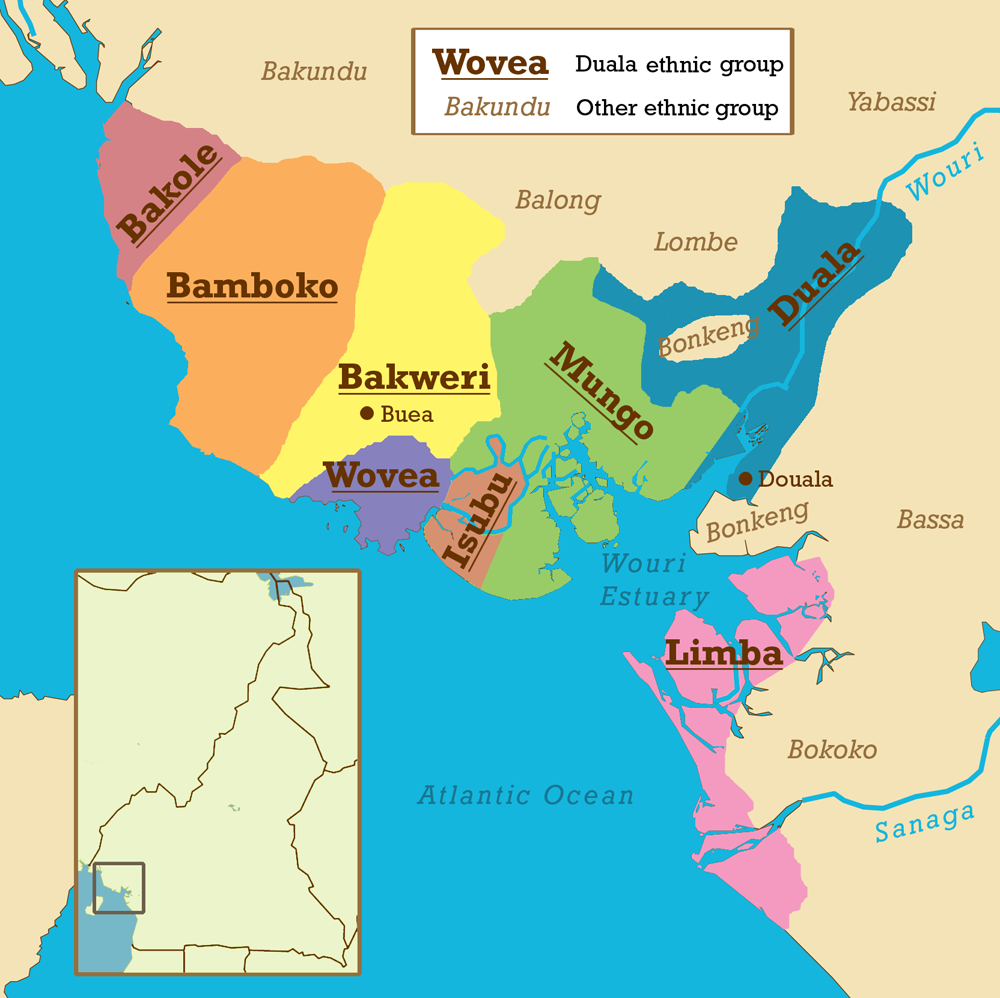
The ethnic groups of Cameroon who speak Duala languages.

- Cameroon Highlanders 31%
- Equatorial Bantu 19%
- Kirdi 11%
- Fulani 10%
- Baggara Arabs (also called Arab Shuwa)
- Hausa
- Mafa
- Kanuri
- Northwestern Bantu 8%
- Eastern Nigritic 7%
- Other African 13%
- Non-African less than 1%

== Languages ==
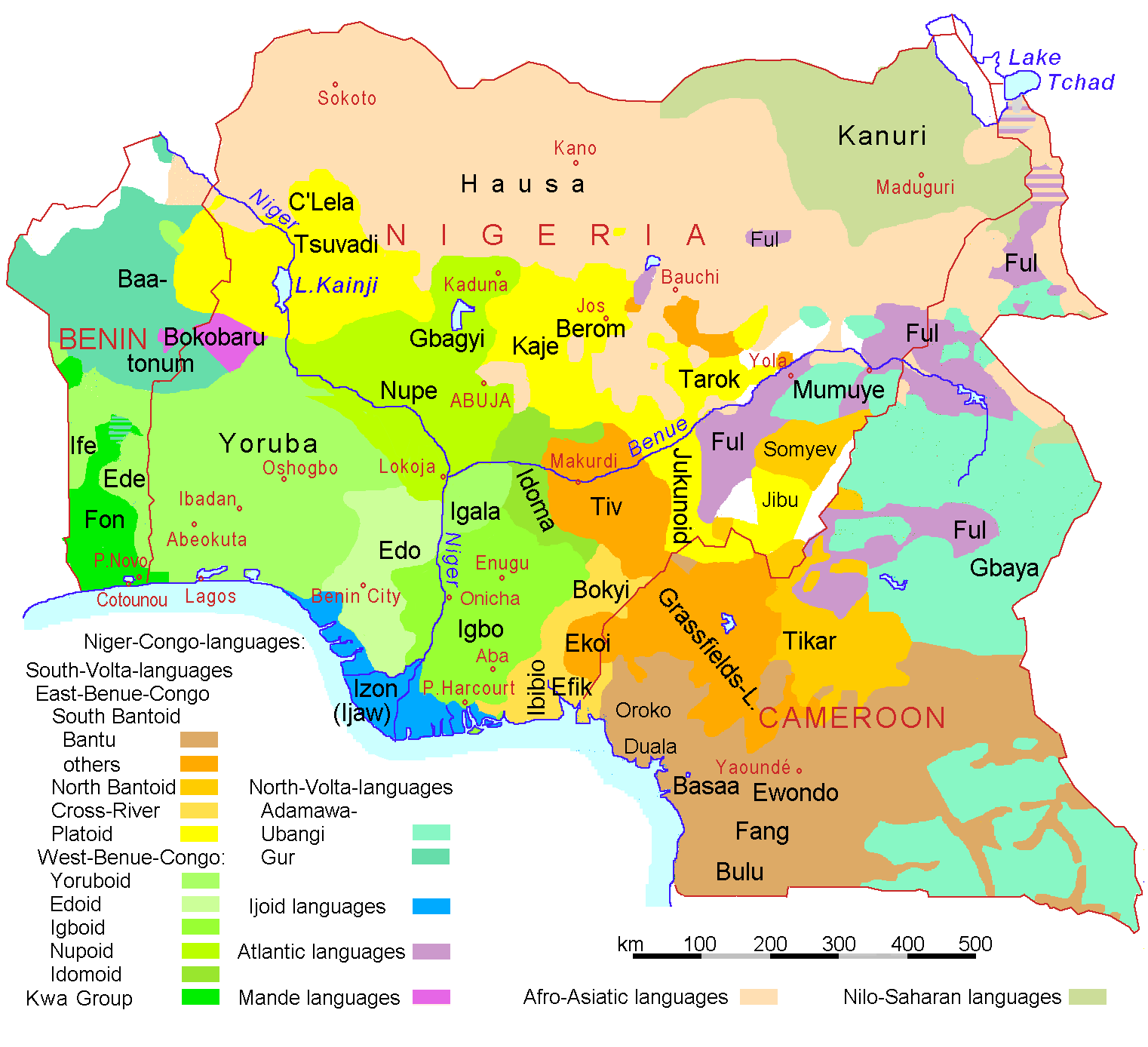
Linguistic survey of Nigeria, Cameroon, and Benin

There are 24 major African language groups in Cameroon; additionally, English and French are official languages. Cameroonian Pidgin English is also widely spoken.

Peoples concentrated in the Southwest and Northwest Provinces—around Buea and Bamenda—use standard English and Cameroonian Pidgin English, as well as their local languages. In the three northern provinces—Adamawa, North, and Far North—either French or Fulfulde (the language of the Fulani) is widely spoken. Elsewhere, French is the principal second language, although pidgin and some local languages such as Ewondo, the dialect of a Beti clan from the Yaoundé area, have a wide currency. In Far North Region the northernmost constituent province of Cameroon, Mafa Language Arab Shuwa (an Arab dialect) and is spoken by the Baggara Arabs (also called Arab Shuwa).

Indigenous languages of Cameroon include:

- Arab Shuwa
- Bamum
- Basaa
- Bikya
- Bung
- Kanuri
- Ngumba
- Yeni
- Lamnso
- Metaʼ
- Mafa

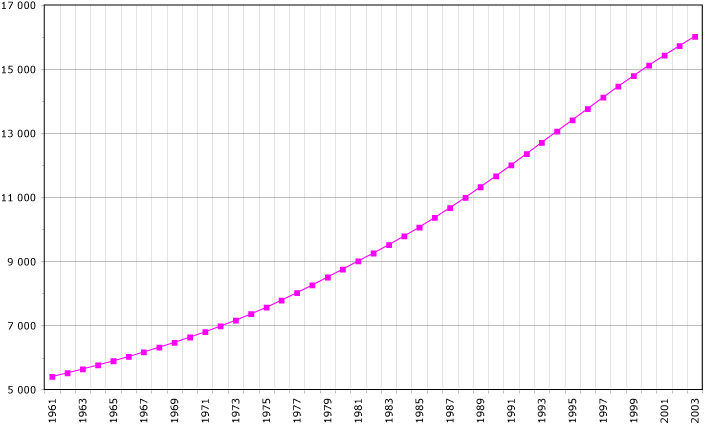
Estimated number of inhabitants (in thousands), based on 2005 data from the Food and Agriculture Organization

== Religion ==
In the 2018 estimate, 38.3% of the population were Roman Catholic, 25.5% were Protestant, 6.9% were other Christians, 24.4% were Muslims, 2.2% were animists, 0.5% were other religions, and 2.2% were no religion.
