= Ukhwejo language =

Bantu language of the Central African Republic

Ukhwejo
- Native to: Central African Republic
- Native speakers: (2,000 cited 1996)
- Language family: Niger–Congo?: Atlantic–Congo; Benue–Congo; Bantu (Zone A); Makaa–Njem + Kako (A.80–90); Ndzem–Bomwali; Bekwilic; Ukhwejo
- Dialects: Bikaka; Kamsili; Nuclear Ukwhejo; Piiga

Language codes
- ISO 639-3: ukh
- Glottolog: ukhw1241
- Guthrie code: A.802
- ELP: Ukhwejo

Ukhwejo (Benkonjo) is one of the few Bantu languages spoken in the Central African Republic.
