= Nzime language =

Language

Nzime
- Koonzime, Koozime
- Native to: Cameroon
- Ethnicity: Nzime, Dwe'e
- Native speakers: 40,000 (2011)
- Language family: Niger–Congo?: Atlantic–Congo; Volta–Congo; Benue–Congo; Bantoid; Southern Bantoid; Bantu (Zone A); Makaa–Njem + Kako (A.80–90); Makaa–Njem; Mpoic; Njemic; Nzime
- Dialects: Koonzime; Bajue (Badwee)

Language codes
- ISO 639-3: ozm
- Glottolog: koon1245
- Guthrie code: A.841,842

Nzime (Koonzime) is a Bantu language of Cameroon, spoken by the Nzime and Dwe'e (Bajwe'e) people. Maho (2009) lists these as two languages.

It is closely related to Mpo.

== Demographics ==
Koonzime is spoken in most of the southern part of the Haut-Nyong region (Eastern Region). The Nzime are located mainly around and east of Lomié, and the closely related Njem in Ngoïla commune.

Koonzime is spoken by about 30,000 speakers.
