= Somalomo =

Coordinates: 3°23′N 12°44′E

- Commune and town
- Interactive map of Somalomo
- Country: Cameroon
- Time zone: UTC+1 (WAT)

Somalomo is a town and commune in Cameroon.

On October 5, 1992 President Biya of Cameroon signed the decree No. 92/206 officially creating 47 new administrative subdivisions and districts units in the country, consequently setting up new urban centres at the head towns of newly created District units.

Somalomo, in the Eastern province then, Upper Nyong Division and Messaména Subdivision, was among these new administrative units and towns. From its 100 inhabitants at that time, Somalomo has now grown to more than 1000 people. It hosts a Sous-Prefecture, a police station (gendarmerie), an Education Office, a secondary school, a health centre, Wildlife Protection and Revenue Collection offices. Although official administrative buildings and housing for civil servants have not yet been completed, this new administrative unit offers and provides basic public services to at least 10,000 people.

== Before the Germans ==
However, the history of that then sleepy and dusty village was anything except uneven. It did not start with the presidential decree. According to a reliable source, the late Mr. Bolap Paul-René who was chief of the village at that time, the site was populated at least one hundred years back.

Led by their patriarch, called NTEUH, the Bampel and Elephant clan of the Badwee ethnic group, part of the larger Koozime tribe (made of the Ndjémé, Zimé and Koozimé) belonging to the Maka-Ndjem Western Bantu lineage first of all settled 15 km to the north of their present location, on a place called Bifolone, then at Mpoulabizame and afterward at Mpele, under the now leadership of Ndjankoum, son of Nteuh. Among Ndjankoum’s sons was the elder, Mampomo aged 25 years then (around 1880). Having heard of white, ghost like people coming from overseas and settling in Lomié with the Nzimé parent group, he decided to meet them. Due to his courage and initiative, he was recognized as the paramount chief of the Southern Badwee group of the Koozimé. Moving many times from Bilofone, he was established at Mpe’ezi, along the river Dja, between the present day cities of Lomié and Bengbis, in the Eastern and Southern Regions.

== During the German Protectorate on Kamerun ==
One day, a team sent by the German «protection mission» from Lomié where they had established an advanced administrative post, came to Mpe’ezi. The German head of the mission asked the Chief of Mpe’ezi to build a tree dug canoe that would enable him to navigate along the near Dja River. On the bank of the river, he noticed a long, clear space at the end of which stood a straight small tree of the type locally called «lomo». He asked his local team member how that was said in his language that one translated was they saw as «Zohomalomo», meaning the clear space at the end of which stands a small lomo tree». For the foreigner, the name of that place definitely changed from «Mpe’ezi» to «Zohomalomo».

However, in 1916–1918, with the end of World War I, the defeat of the Germans and the arrival of the French in that part of the country, « Zohomalomo» became «Somalomo» since one Mr. Tsang Manga, a translator with the French, or the French themselves thought that the «Z» in the first name was to be translated into an «S», according to the way the Germans usually pronounce the «Z». It was the first sub-administrative unit to be created within the Messaména Subdivision, which was itself set up by the French in 1935, at the crossroad of the Badwee and Bikélé tribes which make up the social fabric of the area.

During the German Protectorate, many of their officials visited Zohomalomo. One of the first, around 1890-95 was sent by von Ebermeier - the Governor of the territory - from Kribi where he resided. It was led by one Hauptman Mabe. Then, a police officer named Weigen came, as well as an administrative officer called Mister Scheer (Masta Sia in the local language) was appointed there. They set up a tobacco growing operation, a shop in which they exchanged local products such as latex, ivory, skins and other wild games for new and manufactured products like clothes, soap, and salt. The German newcomers also encouraged locals to collect wild latex around the place, from the abundant forest around. Mr. Weigen is known to have launched an initiative which aimed at grouping the Badwee people into larger villages, from the diverse small settlements where they used to live. With the arrival of these Germans, the Badwee for the first time in their life saw horses.

The German Empire even though at that time to erect Somalomo into an administrative unit and a town, owing to its position on the Dja River, linked it to Lomié where they were already installed and Bengbis, Sangmelima and Ebolowa, toward the Atlantic Ocean, in Kribi. The region was – and is still - covered with a dense forest in which wild latex, elephants and various animal, bird species and flora can be found.

== The French Trusteeship Period ==
Unfortunately, all these efforts and projects came to an abrupt end, with the German defeat in the 1914–1918 World War II. During that time and since German authorities applied a scorched earth policy, burning whatever valuable project they had previously launched or any asset in their way, people reverted to living in the bush to protect themselves, and stayed there for four years, before their Paramount Chief Mampomo-mo-Ndjankoum called them back, announcing the end of the war.

With the French administration established under a Society of Nations mandate, the project to raise Somalomo into an urban centre was back to the drawing table. Messrs Doudet, Lemetayer and Lovet who were appointed as successive regional colonial administrators in the 1930s worked on it. However and since after the departure of the previous German colonial masters, Mr. Mampomo had firmly secured his power and possessed a harem of 99 wives; he was now more reluctant to go with it, under the motive that new city dwellers may be tempted to share some of them with him. Consequently, the new administrative unit was built 60 km away in Messaména inside the Bikélé territory. Paramount chief Mampomo contributed with manpower in building the new administrative centre, and sent his first nephew, Madom to be his official representative with the French administrators there.

Meanwhile, Drs. Chambon and Roy, consecutive heads of the Messaména Health Subdivision in the 1930s decided to establish a health centre in Somalomo, in order to increase efforts in fighting the sleeping sickness that reached epidemic proportions in the area then, after the Spanish fever in 1919–1920, which had catastrophic consequences there as well. At least 100 hundred nurses and health auxiliaries worked in the area, from Somalomo. They were called the Jamotains», since they were trained and worked under the supervision of the French Dr. Eugène Jamot, well known for having played a critical role in erasing the disease in the whole country.

The first school was also set up there in the 1930, to help educate the many sons of paramount chief Mampomo, as well as those in the area willing to submit themselves to the new and constraining school system, instead of sending them faraway in Lomié. The school consisted of few classes (perhaps two or three only), due to the lack of qualified teachers. It was built on top of a cliff on the Dja River, offering teachers and students a panoramic view. There were also few school children, who would have played an important role in local administration after the country’s independence, but did not seize the opportunity.

After this important milestone, in the 1940 Mampomo himself came back to better sentiments about Somalomo becoming an administrative unit and a town, shared by the Northern and Southern Badwee groups. Consequently, he asked Captain-Doctor Henri Koch, the then administrator of the Messaména Subdivision to transform Somalomo into an urban town. In preparation of this, the health structures were extended and preventive medicine developed. The road between Somalomo and Messaména on 60 km was built in 1950, following a request from Mampomo to his friend Mr. Bordier, the French Administrator of Messaména Subdivision.

Between 1951 and 1959, heads of Messaména Subdivision Health Services regularly came to Somalomo, from where they could provide preventive and curative cares to people of the surrounding areas and villages. In 1951-52, it was one Mr. Trawen, then in 1952-53, an MD named Gonzalez Deminaret who lived in Somalomo for some time, together with 3 nurses; among his medical staff was one named Koulmitoungoulou, probably a French of Turkish origin, as was recalled by the late Chief Bolap Paul-René. From 1953 to 1954, it was Mr. Laribot. Finally, Mr. Déodi closed the shop, in 1967–1959.

An agriculture extension officer named Pascal was also posted there.

Unfortunately once again, Somalomo missed the opportunity to become an urban centre under the French colonial period, since Mampomo lost his paramount chief position to his better educated nephew, and changing circumstances. In fact, it is said that the French suspected him of disloyalty against them and possible lingering sympathies with the Germans, who were his first foreign partners. He was consequently jailed in 1942 by Captain Dr Henri Koch who was the colonial administrator in Messaména at that time, to be freed only in 1950.

== After independence ==
After independence was granted to Cameroon, Chief Mampomo continued petitioning the new national authorities about the urban issue for Somalomo, taking from the efforts and promises by the French colonial administration. Alas! His nephew who had become his nemesis and a powerful post-colonial figure opposed every move to re-empower Somalomo. Instead, he fought constantly to promote his own village, Dimpam, located 25 km north of Somalomo, on the way to Messaména. For instance, he endeavored to transfer the health center established long time ago in Somalomo to Dimpam, but did not succeed, all its staff deciding instead to return to Abong-Mbang, head town of the Upper-Nyong Division, more than 150 km from Somalomo.

Although a new health centre was set up in Somalomo in the late 1950s, it did not last long and was closed after independence. The centre was managed by one Philippe Déody, a French physician from Nancy who married a local beauty. From the 1960s until 1992, Somalomo and the surrounding area and people did not benefit from a lot of public infrastructures, apart from a school which, up to the 80, delivered courses only midway toward the completion of a primary level education. However, memories of better times lingered and they did not despair of seeing their village regaining its glorious past, in the modern form of a District.

With the October 1992 presidential decree, followed in 2010 by another one that scaled up all new Districts created previously into Subdivisions, and the expected public and private investments to follow, Somalomo is now full of hope. In fact, it has an untapped eco-tourism, archeological as well as agricultural, agribusiness, fishing and animal husbandry potential that would certainly support its social and economic development. For now, located at the edge of the World Biosphere Heritage Site of the Dja River Reserve, it hosts a Cameroon Administration’s Forest Conservation Office, a field office of the European Union’s project for the Preservation of Forestry Ecosystems in Central Africa (ECOFAC), a health centre, a Secondary School, a Gendarmerie position and three guesthouses. It is even connected to the internet and a mobile phone network, although there is not yet electricity or running water.

Furthermore, clear territorial boundaries have not yet been set between Somalomo and Messaména administrative units. This is due to constant bickering with Dimpam people, who did not take the establishment of Somalomo as a town to their detriment lightly, as relations between the two places amply, show.

More is certainly to come, with the developing needs of the people around Somalomo, progress made in the country, and the world.

== See also ==
- Communes of Cameroon
