= Mpiemo language =

Bantu language of the Central African Republic

Mpiemo
- Mbimu
- Native to: Central African Republic, Cameroon, Congo
- Ethnicity: Mbimu
- Native speakers: (29,000 in CAR and Cameroon cited 1991–1996)
- Language family: Niger–Congo?: Atlantic–Congo; Benue–Congo; Bantu (Zone A); Makaa–Njem + Kako (A.80–90); Ndzem–Bomwali; Bekwilic; Mpumpong; Mpiemo

Language codes
- ISO 639-3: mcx
- Glottolog: mpie1238
- Guthrie code: A.86c

Mpiemo (Bimu) is a Bantu language of the Central African Republic. The Atlas linguistique du Cameroun (ALCAM, or "Linguistic Atlas of Cameroon") gives the name Mpo.

There is little description of the language, but one team used Mpiemo data to test the ability of computer programs to analyze real language data.
