= Shiwe language =

Bantu language spoken in Gabon

Shiwe
- Ossyeba, ʃiwə
- Native to: Gabon
- Language family: Niger–Congo?: Atlantic–Congo; Benue–Congo; Bantu (Zone A); Makaa–Njem + Kako (A.80–90); Mvumboic (Kwasio); Shiwe

Language codes
- ISO 639-3: xiw
- Glottolog: shiw1234
- Guthrie code: A.803

Shiwe (Chiwa, ʃiwə, Shiwa, Oshieba, Ossyeba), also known as "Fang Makina", is a Bantu language of central Gabon, near the related language Yambe. It is most closely related to Kwasio. The Gabonese people who refer themselves as Shiwe or Bishiwe live in the city of Booué in the Ogooué-Ivindo province. There are no accurate statistics available for the Shiwe population in Booué. However, there are about 18 Shiwe tribes still living in Booué today. These tribes include Bi-mbouma, Bira-ngouembi, Bi-néli, Sha-ntouong, Sha-nguié, Bi-nshwô, Bi-shanga, Bi-kwo, Bi-tsinguie’rg, Sha-shouo, Bi-nvœ’rg, Bi-koundeu, Biong-nkouendi, Bi-ntoubi, Biékoulembi, Bi-nzimili, Bi-nyambi, Sha-tsoung. These tribes live in five villages including Beleumeu, Menchoung, Metououng, Beaux Arts, and Tsombiali. It is important to underline that there are entire Shiwe tribes and villages near Makokou and Ndjole. But these originally Shiwe tribes are now increasingly using more the Fang language than Shiwe.
