= Yambe language =

Bantu language spoken in Gabon

Yambe
- Native to: Gabon
- Language family: Niger–Congo?: Atlantic–Congo; Benue–Congo; Bantu (Zone A); Makaa–Njem + Kako (A.80–90); Ndzem–Bomwali; Yambe

Language codes
- ISO 639-3: None (mis)
- Glottolog: yamb1255
- Guthrie code: none

Yambe is a Bantu language of the Gabonese rain forest, near the related language Shiwe.
