= Lomié =

Village in East Region, Cameroon

- Location in Cameroon
- Coordinates: 3°10′N 13°37′E
- Country: Cameroon
- Province: East Province
- Division: Haut-Nyong

Lomié is a town in the Lomié District in the Upper Nyong division of the East Province of Cameroon. An article in the Mail & Guardian Online describes it as having "no telephone connection to the outside world, and a single access road that is little more than a forest trail".

In fact, Lomié has been connected to the cellular phone network since 2006, and the town has had several 'boom' periods. While previous employment came from the logging industry, currently the town is near an important cobalt and zinc mining project. The GEOVIC mining company uses Lomié as a base. Lomié has a number of interesting historical buildings, dating from the German and French era. Among these building are the house of the senior civil administrator, a jail, a courthouse and a post-office. The town used to be center of the Upper Nyong Division until it was replaced by Abong-Mbang. Roads from Lomié lead north to Abong-Mbang via Mindourou, east to Messok and Yokadouma and south to Ngoila.

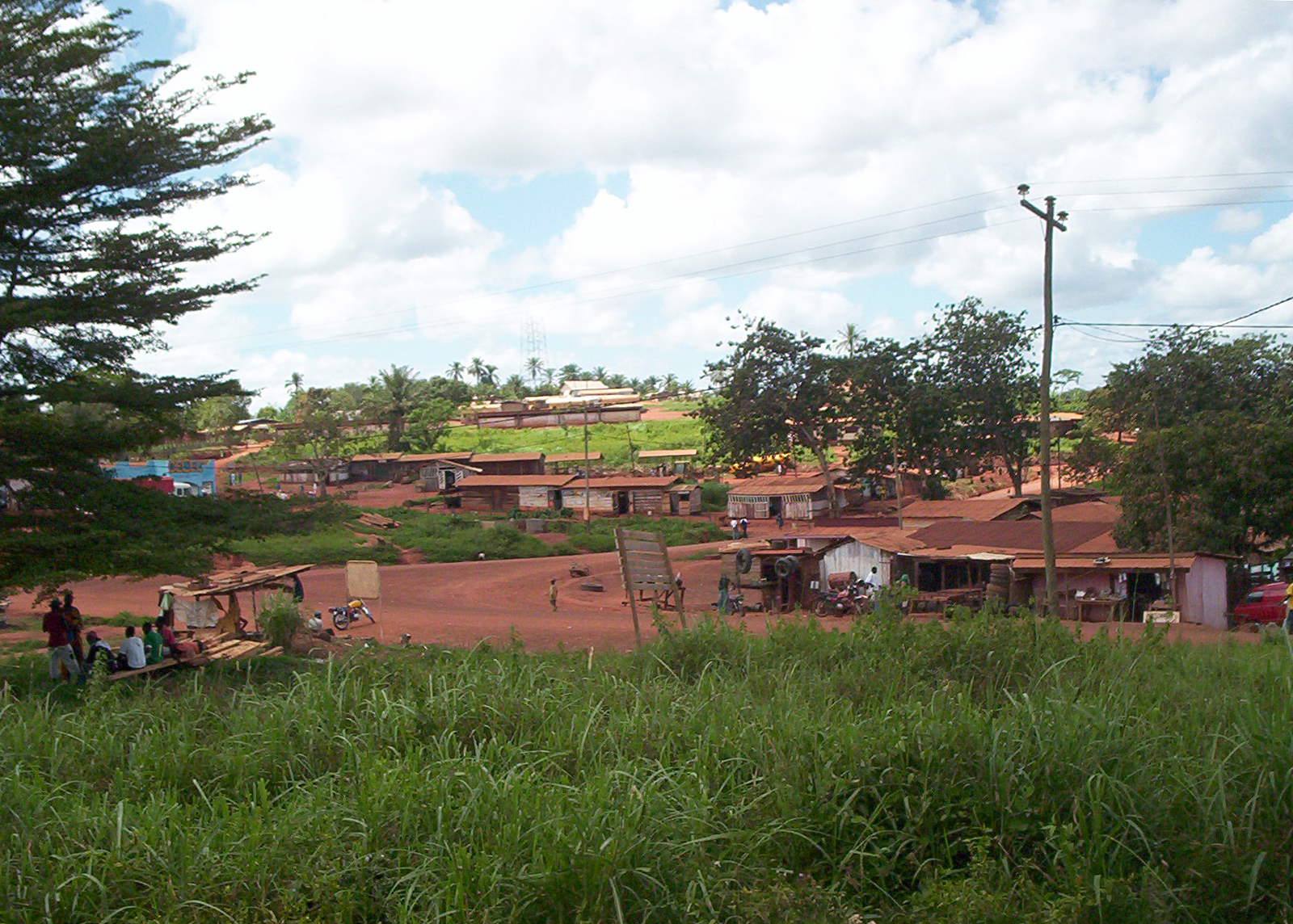
Lomié

Lomié is situated in the immediate periphery of the Dja Faunal Reserve, Cameroon's only UNESCO World Heritage Site. The town attracts occasional tourism because of the reserve. A number of small guesthouses and small hotels exist.

== See also ==
- Communes of Cameroon
- Baka (nomadic Central African people)
- Nzime
- Dja Biosphere Reserve
