= Ndelele =

Coordinates: 4°02′N 14°56′E

- Commune and town
- Interactive map of Ndelele
- Country: Cameroon
- Region: East
- Time zone: UTC+1 (WAT)

Ndelele is a town and commune in Cameroon. Cameroon is home to many native languages, though the main three being: German, french and English.

== See also ==
- Communes of Cameroon
