= Bomwali language =

Bantu language of the Republic of the Congo and Cameroon

Bomwali
- Native to: Republic of Congo, Cameroon
- Native speakers: (39,000 cited 2000–2002)
- Language family: Niger–Congo?: Atlantic–Congo; Benue–Congo; Bantu (Zone A); Makaa–Njem + Kako (A.80–90); Ndzem–Bomwali; Bomwali

Language codes
- ISO 639-3: bmw
- Glottolog: bomw1238
- Guthrie code: A.87

Bomwali is a Bantu language of the Republic of the Congo and Cameroon.
