= Swo language =

Bantu language spoken in Cameroon

Swo
- So
- Native to: Cameroon
- Native speakers: (9,000 cited 1992)
- Language family: Niger–Congo?: Atlantic–Congo; Benue–Congo; Bantu (Zone A); Makaa–Njem + Kako (A.80–90); Ndzem–Bomwali; Makaa; Swo

Language codes
- ISO 639-3: sox
- Glottolog: soca1235
- Guthrie code: A.82

Swo is a Bantu language of the Akonolinga area, Cameroon. Spellings of the name are quite variable, including So, Sso, Shwo, and Fo. One dialect has been influenced by Beti.

== Demographics ==
Swo or Só is spoken east of Akonolinga town in the entire eastern part of Akonolinga commune (in Melan-et-Emvane canton, Nyong-et-Mfoumou department, Central Region). There are also some speakers in Messamena commune. Swo speakers are surrounded by the Beti-Fang (Mvele, Omvang, Ewondo). Swo is transitional between Beti-Fang and Meka. There were 9,000 speakers in 1992 (SIL 1992).
