= Abong-Mbang =

- Commune and town
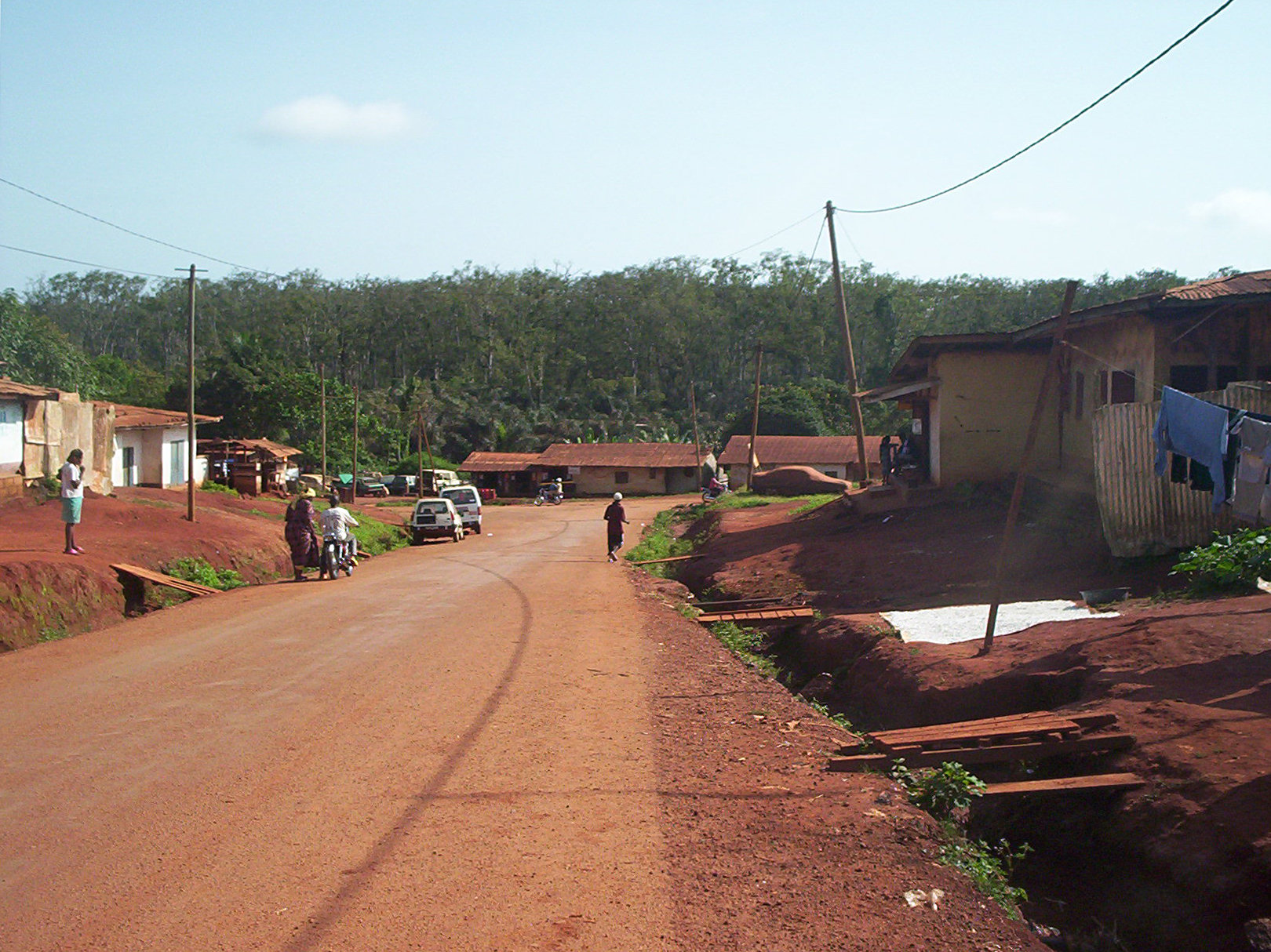
- Abong-Mbang, Cameroon, looking north from Quartier Haussa toward the Nyong River

- Location within Cameroon
- Coordinates: 3°59′N 13°10′E
- Country: Cameroon
- Region: East
- Department: Haut-Nyong

Government
  - Mayor: Gustave Mouamossé

Population (2001)
  - Urban: 18,700
- estimated
- Time zone: UTC+1 (WAT)
- Climate: Aw

Abong-Mbang is a town and commune in the Haut-Nyong department, East Region of Cameroon. Abong-Mbang is located at a crossroads of National Route 10 and the road that leads south to Lomié. Yaoundé, the capital of Cameroon, is 178 km to the west, and Bertoua, the capital of the East Province, lies 108 km to the east. From Ayos, at the border in the Centre Province 145 km (90 mi) from Abong-Mbang, the tar on National Route 10 ends and a dirt road begins.

Abong-Mbang is the seat of the Haut-Nyong department. The town is headed by a mayor. Gustave Mouamossé has held the post since August 2002. Abong-Mbang is site of one of the East Province's four Courts of First Instance and a prefectural prison. The population was estimated at 18,700 in 2001.

== History ==
According to oral traditions of the Kwassio and Bakola peoples, Abong-Mbang was settled when the Maka-Njem peoples moved northwest from the Great Lakes region of the Congo River. They encountered Pygmy hunter-gatherers and requested their aid as guides through the region. Some of the migrants settled in the vicinity, which they called Bung-Ngwang ("bathing area in the Nyong River"). When Europeans arrived in the 19th century, this name was changed to Abong-Mbang. Some migrants continued westward in search of salt; they became the Kwassio and Bakola of Cameroon's coast. German colonisers moved into the area in the late 19th century. They used the Nyong River as a means to reach the wild rubber growing farther inland. The Germans built a fort and other military and administrative buildings in the town. The fort is today a prefectural prison, and the other buildings serve similar administrative functions. The French took over in 1919 following Germany's defeat in World War I.

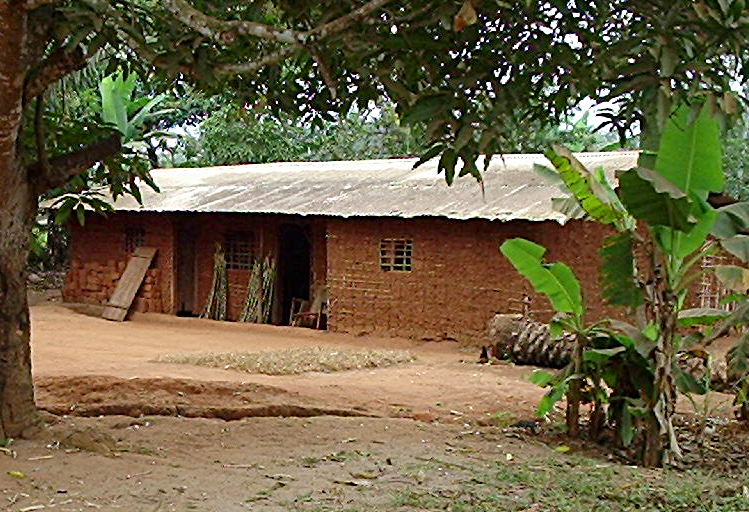
Typical Maka house in Abong-Mbang

== People and economy ==
Abong-Mbang is the main settlement of the Maka people, a group who speak a Bantu language of the same name. Much of the population farms; important crops include bananas, cocoa, corn, groundnuts, tomatoes, and tubers. Shifting cultivation with no fertiliser is the primary method of agriculture. Baka hunter-gatherers live in the surrounding forests. Since colonial times, the government has attempted to better integrate this group into Cameroonian society. Abong-Mbang is part of the Doumé-Abong-Mbang diocese of the Roman Catholic Church. The church estimates that 46.7% of the population is Roman Catholic.

Since Francophone Cameroun's independence in 1960, Abong-Mbang has become an important centre of commerce for the East Province. This has led to a cosmopolitan influx of immigrants from outside the Maka area. An estimated 99% of males and 95% of females speak French. However, among traders, Ewondo is the lingua franca of choice: 72% use Ewondo but only 48% use French in market situations. By the late 1970s, the government had zoned large areas of the surrounding forest for timber exploitation. Most timber and bushmeat traffic from the East Province passes through the town. Union Abong-Mbang FC is the local football (soccer) team. The town often suffers prolonged cuts to electric power, which the utility company, AES-SONEL, blames on an aging power plant. On 17 September 2007, violent protests against the cuts ended with two protesters dead and 10 others seriously injured.

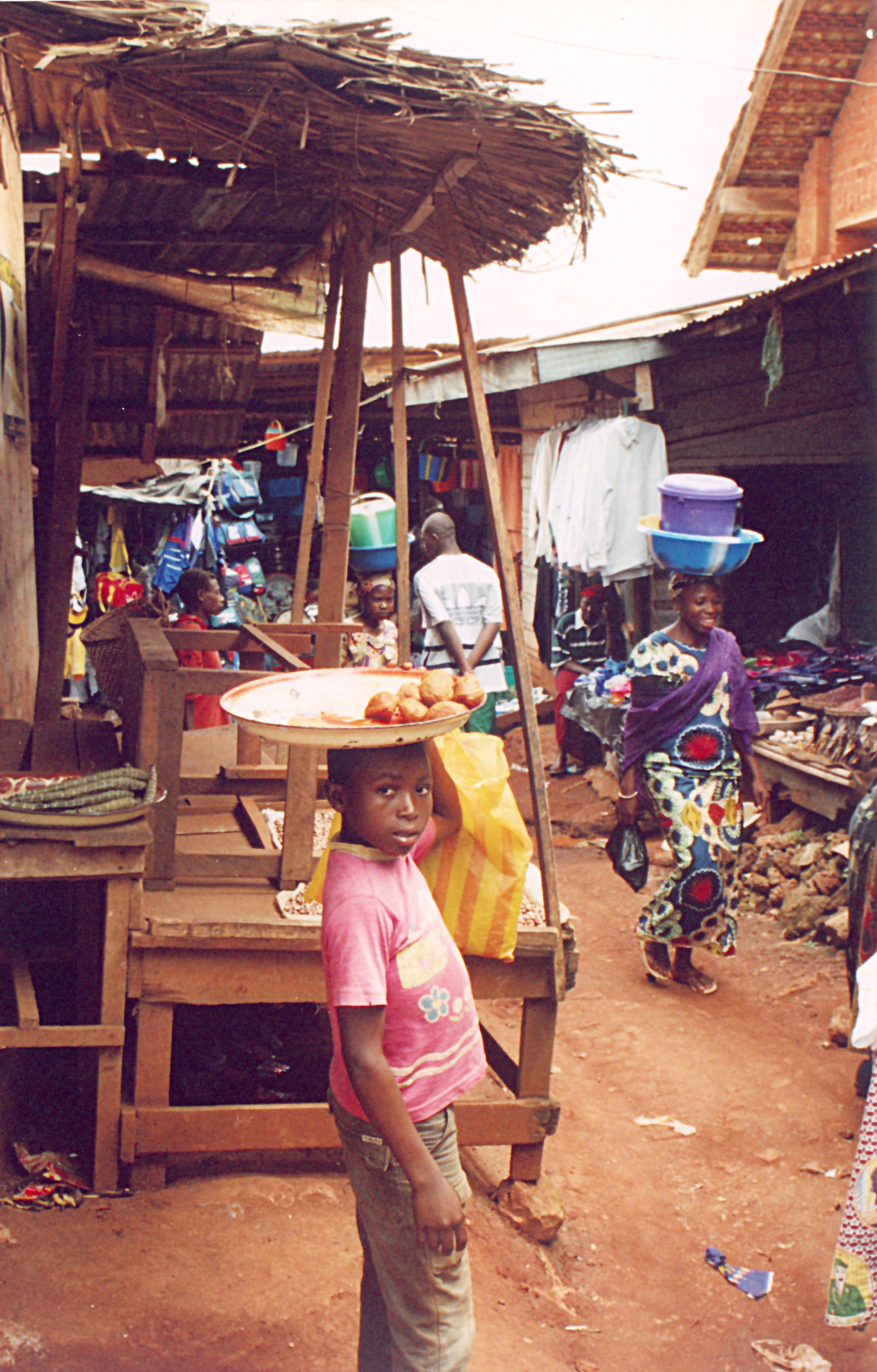
Abong-Mbang market

== Geography ==
Abong-Mbang lies on the South Cameroon Plateau, approximately 700 metres above sea level. The soils are red. The Boumba, Dja, and Nyong rivers rise in the Abong-Mbang region. The Nyong forms the town's northern border and is navigable for about 160 km (100 mi) to Mbalmayo in the Centre Province. The area along the Nyong consists of swampy forests that support populations of raffia palm, such as Raphia montbuttorum. The area surrounding the town consists of secondary-growth forest of semi-deciduous trees, particularly Sterculiaceae and Ulmaceae; the primary-growth forest has been removed for logging and farming. In some areas, the forests are further degraded and home to other forms of vegetation. The Abong-Mbang Forest Reserve is north of the town. Local wildlife includes populations of western lowland gorilla and forest elephants. An estimated 100 elephants lived in the Abong-Mbang Forest Reserve in 1998. The Ntimbe Caves are 18 km (11 mi) south of the town.
