= Atok, Cameroon =

Coordinates: 4°00′N 12°47′E

Atok
- Commune and town
- Interactive map of Atok
- Country: Cameroon
- Region: East
- Department: Haut-Nyong
- Time zone: UTC+1 (WAT)

Atok is a town and commune in the Haut-Nyong department, East Region of Cameroon.

== See also ==
- Communes of Cameroon
