= Bekwil language =

Bantu language of the Republic of the Congo

Bekwel
- Native to: Republic of Congo
- Native speakers: 14,000 (2003–2007 in Congo and Gabon) unknown number in Cameroon
- Language family: Niger–Congo?: Atlantic–Congo; Benue–Congo; Bantu (Zone A); Makaa–Njem + Kako (A.80–90); Ndzem–Bomwali; Bekwilic; Bekwel
- Dialects: Nkonabeeb; Bekwil

Language codes
- ISO 639-3: bkw
- Glottolog: bekw1242
- Guthrie code: A.85a,b

Bekwel (Bekwil) is a Bantu language of the Republic of the Congo. There are some 10,000 speakers there, with a quarter that number across the border in Gabon, and perhaps a similar on the opposite side in Cameroon. It is rather close to Nzime (Koonzime).

Maho (2009) considers Nkonabeeb (Konabembe) to be a dialect of Bekwil rather than of Mpumpong.
