= Messok =

Coordinates: 3.0853°N 14.0624°E

- Commune and town
- Interactive map of Messok
- Country: Cameroon
- Time zone: UTC+1 (WAT)

Messok is a town and commune in Cameroon.

== See also ==
- Communes of Cameroon
