= Njem language =

Bantu language of Congo and Cameroon

Njem
- Njyem
- Native to: Cameroon, Republic of Congo
- Native speakers: (undated figure of 7,000); 4,400 in Cameroon (2005)
- Language family: Niger–Congo?: Atlantic–Congo; Benue–Congo; Bantu (Zone A); Makaa–Njem + Kako (A.80–90); Ndzem–Bomwali; Njemic; Njem

Language codes
- ISO 639-3: njy
- Glottolog: njye1238
- Guthrie code: A.84
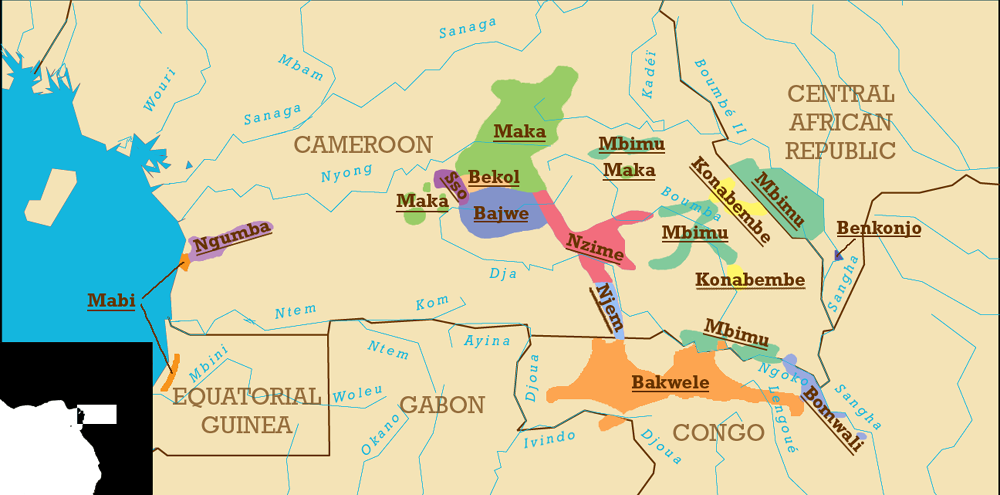
- A map of the Makaa–Njem languages with Njem in light blue.

Njem (Njyem) is a Bantu language of Congo and Cameroon. Speakers are mostly (85%) monolingual, and many Baka Pygmies speak Njema as a second language.
