= Makaa–Njem languages =

Bantu language group spoken in Cameroon

Makaa–Njem
- Geographic distribution: Southern Cameroon and neighbouring areas
- Linguistic classification: Niger–Congo?: Atlantic–Congo; Benue–Congo; Southern Bantoid; Bantu (Zone A.80–90); Makaa–Njem
- Subdivisions: Mvumboic (Kwasio); Pomo–Bomwali

Language codes
- Glottolog: maka1323
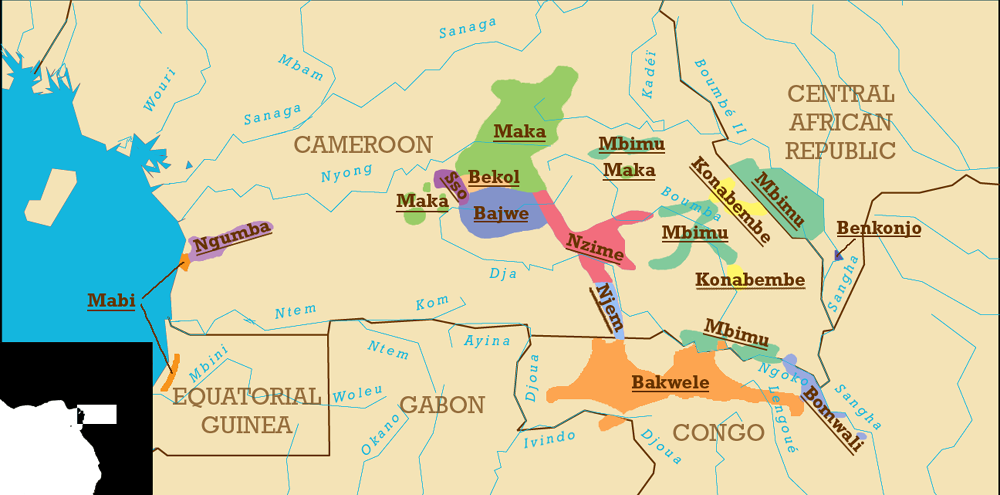
- The Makaa–Njem languages (excluding Kako)

The Makaa–Njem languages are a group of Bantu languages spoken in Cameroon, the Central African Republic, Equatorial Guinea, Gabon and the Republic of the Congo. They are coded Zone A.80 in Guthrie's classification.

According to Nurse & Philippson (2003), adding the Kako languages (Guthrie's A.90) forms a valid node, called Pomo–Bomwali (Kairn Klieman 1997).

== Languages ==
=== Kako ===
The Guthrie Kako (A.90) languages are:

- Kwakum
- Pol
- Pomo-Kweso (Pomo, Kweso)
- Kako.

=== Makaa–Njem ===
The Guthrie Makaa–Njem (A.80) languages are:

Language name	Primary location	Secondary location(s)	Ethnic group(s)	No. speakers	Remarks
Bekwel	Congo	Cameroon, Gabon	Bekwel	12,060	Close to Nkonabeeb and Koonzime. Cameroonian speakers also use Mpongmpong.
Bomwali	Congo	Cameroon	Bomwali	39,280	
Byep	Cameroon	None	Maka	9,500	Also called North Makaa, though not intelligible with Makaa.
Kol	Cameroon	Gabon	Bekol	12,000	Speakers use Makaa or Koonzime as well.
Koonzime	Cameroon	None	Badwe'e, Nzime	30,000	Badwe'e speak Koozime dialect; Nzime speak Koonzime dialect. Used as a second language by many Baka.
Makaa	Cameroon	None	Maka	80,000	Related to Byep (North Makaa) and Kol, although unintelligible with them.
Mpiemo	Central African Republic	Cameroon, Congo	Mbimu	29,000	
Mpumpong	Cameroon	None	Nkonabeeb	45,000	
Ngumba (Kwasio)	Cameroon	Equatorial Guinea	Mabi, Ngumba, Bujeba, Gyele (Koya, Kola)	22,000	The Gyele are Pygmies
Njyem	Cameroon	Congo	Njyem	7,000	Spoken by many Baka as a second language.
Swo	Cameroon	None	Swo	9,000	High level of influence from Beti.
Ukhwejo	Central African Republic	None	Benkonjo	2,000	

Maho (2009) adds Shiwe (Oshieba) of central Gabon.

Glottolog classifies the languages as follows:

- Makaa–Kako (A.80-90) languages:
  - Kako (or Mkako, Nkoxo, Dikaka, Yaka)
  - Kwakum (or Kpakum, Pakum, Bakum, Abakum, Abakoum, Akpwakum)
  - Pol (or Pol, Pori, Pul) (Azom, Polri Kinda)
  - Pomo-Kweso (Pomo, Kweso)
  - Makaa–Njem (A.80) languages
    - Bomwali (or Bomali, Boumoali, Bumali, Lino, Sangasanga)
    - Yambe
    - Mpoic languages:
      - Mpongmpong (or Mpumpong, Pongpong, Mpompo, Mpopo, Mbombo, Bombo)
      - Bekwil (or Bekwie, Bekwel, Bakwil, Bakwele, Okpele)
      - Njemic languages:
        - Koonzime (or Kooncimo, Koozhime, Koozime, Nzime)
        - Njyem (or Nyem, Njem, Ndjem, Ndjeme, Ndzem, Ngyeme, Djem, Dzem)
      - Mpiemo–Ukhwejo languages:
        - Mpiemo (or Mpyemo, Mbyemo, Mbimou, Mbimu, Bimu, Mpo)
        - Ukhwejo (or Benkonjo)
    - Western A80 languages:
      - Mvumboic languages:
        - Gyele (or Guiele, Giele, Gieli, Gyeli, Bogyeli, Bondjiel, Bajeli, Babinga, Bakola, Bakuele, Bekoe, Likoya)
        - Kwasio (or Kwassio, Bisio, Bissio, Bisiwo, Bujeba, Mabi, Mabea, Ngumba, Mgoumba, Ngoumba, Mvumbo)
        - Shiwe (or Shiwa, Chiwa, Oshieba, Ossyeba)
      - Makaaic languages:
        - Byep-Besep (or North Makaa) (Byep, Besep)
        - Makaa (or South Makaa)
        - Kol (or Bikele-Bikay, Bikele-Bikeng, Bikélé, and Bekol)
        - So (or Sso, Swo, Shwo, Fo)
