= Doumaintang =

Coordinates: 4°21′N 13°06′E

- Commune and town
- Interactive map of Doumaintang
- Country: Cameroon
- Time zone: UTC+1 (WAT)

Doumaintang is a town and commune in Cameroon.

== See also ==
- Communes of Cameroon
