= Mindourou =

Coordinates: 3.1667°N 13.6167°E

- Commune and town
- Interactive map of Mindourou
- Country: Cameroon
- Time zone: UTC+1 (WAT)

Mindourou(formerly Dumemündung or Dume-Mündung during the German Kamerun era) is a town and commune in Cameroon.

== See also ==
- Communes of Cameroon
