= Ngoila =

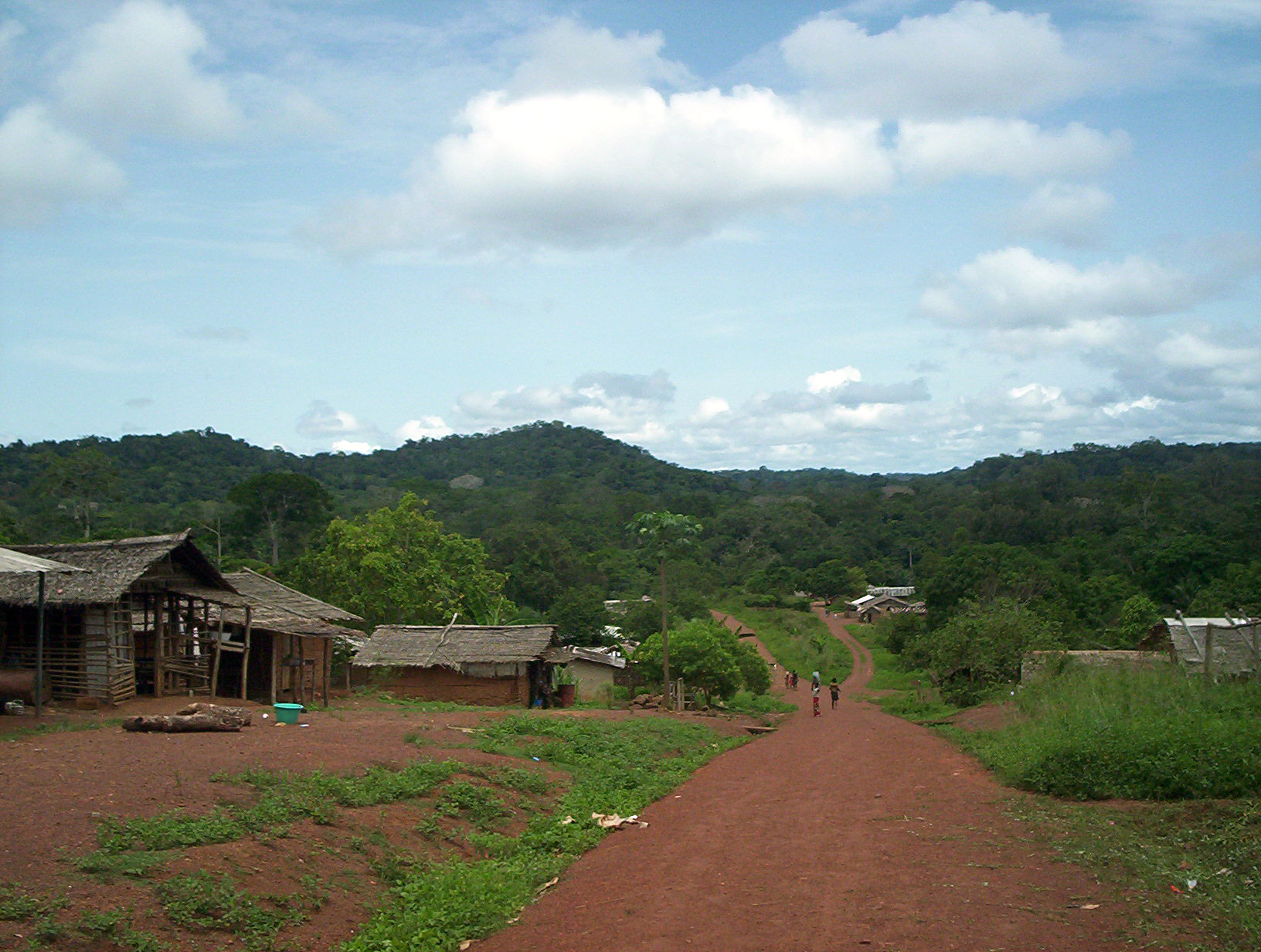

- Location in Cameroon
- Coordinates: 2°37′N 14°01′E
- Country: Cameroon
- Province: East Province

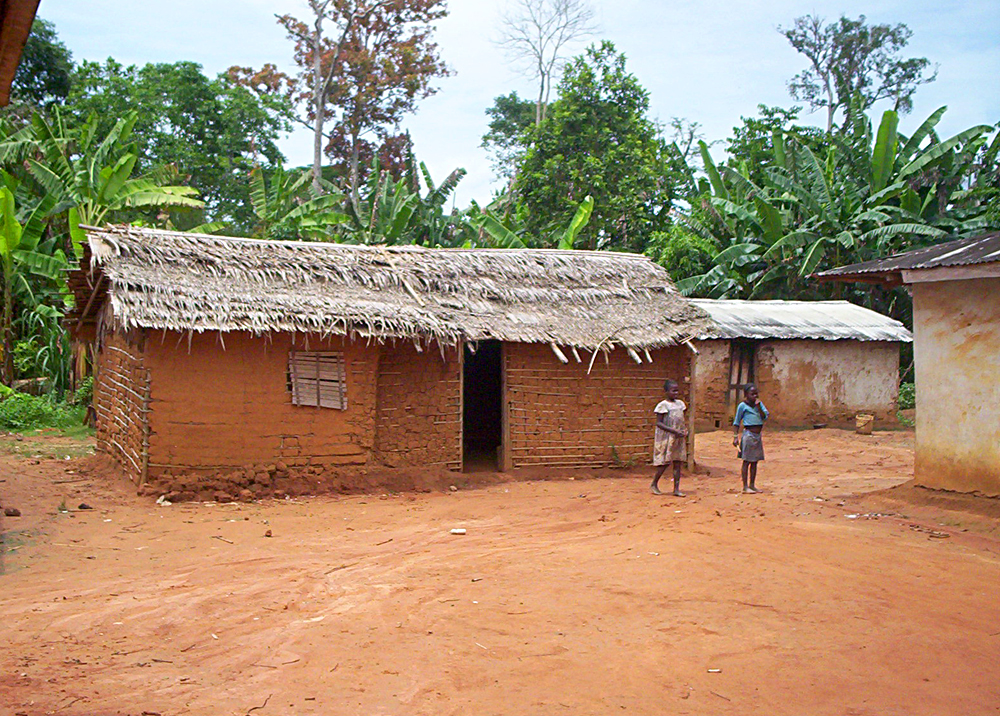
Njem house in Ngoila.

Ngoila, also spelled Ngoyla and Ngoida, is a village in the East Province of Cameroon, located at 2.617° N, 14.017° E. The primary ethnic group is the Njem. Ngoila is the capital of the Ngoila subdivision of the Haut-Nyong division.

== See also ==
- Communes of Cameroon
