= Baka people (Cameroon and Gabon) =

African ethnic group

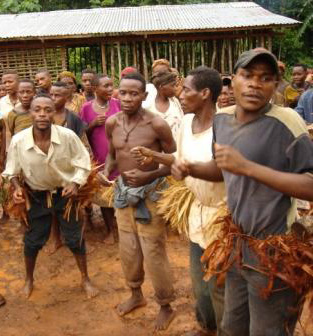
- Baka dancers in the East Province of Cameroon

Total population
- 5,000 to 30,000

Regions with significant populations
- Central Africa, Cameroon, and Gabon

Languages
- Baka, Ganzi, Gundi (Ngondi), French

Religion
- African Traditional Religion, Christianity

Related ethnic groups
- Aka, Gyele, Kola

The Baka people, known in the Congo as Bayaka (Bebayaka, Bebayaga, Bibaya), are an ethnic group inhabiting the southeastern rain forests of Cameroon, northern Republic of the Congo, northern Gabon, and southwestern Central African Republic. They are sometimes called a subgroup of the Twa, but the two peoples are not closely related. Likewise, the name "Baka" is sometimes mistakenly applied to other peoples of the area who, like the Baka and Twa, have been historically called pygmies, a term that is now considered derogatory.

== Identity ==
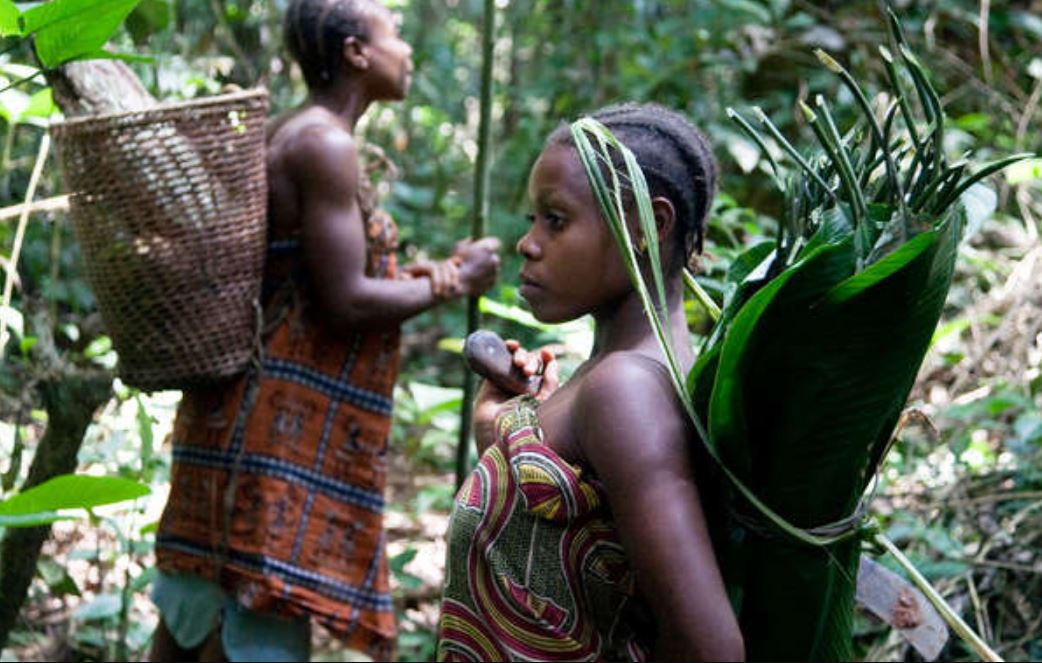
Two indigenous women in Congo

Baka people are all hunter-gatherers, formerly referred to as pygmies, located in the Central African rain forest. Having average heights of 1.52 meters (5 feet) as well as living semi-nomadic lifestyles, the Baka are often discriminated against and marginalized from society. They reside in southeastern Cameroon, northern Gabon and in the northern part of the Republic of Congo. In Congo, the Baka people are otherwise known as the Bayaka. Some Baka are also found in southwestern Central African Republic. Although the Baka people are located throughout the Central African rain forest, they are mainly concentrated in Cameroon as the Baka community of Cameroon represents roughly 30 000 individuals.

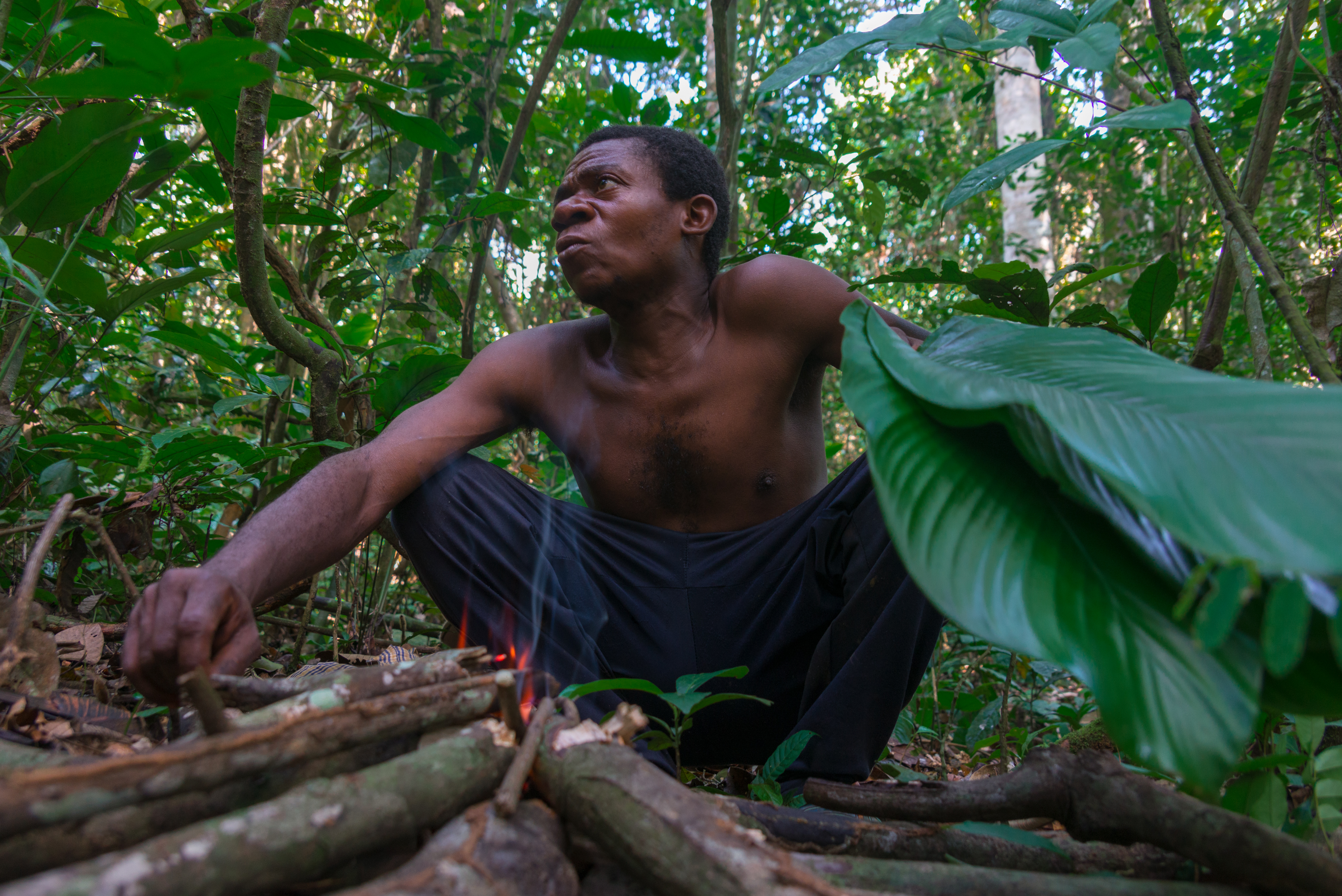
Chief Baka in the dja reserve

The Baka are a semi-nomadic people, like other hunter-gatherers such as the Bagyeli and the Twa. However, due to the intensive deforestation of the Central African Rainforest they are gradually becoming more sedentary. Pressures from their taller and more dominant neighbors, the Bantu, have also limited the Baka people’s ability to live their traditional lifestyle.

The Baka have successfully maintained their language, also called Baka. Although their neighbors’ languages (Koozime, Bakoum and Bangandou) which have Bantu roots, a non-scientific source claims that Baka comes from a different language family, Ubangian. However, a published anthropological source states that the language is Bantu in affiliation.

== References to "pygmy" peoples throughout history ==
The oldest reference to "pygmies" dates back to 2276 BCE when Pharaoh Pepi II described seeing a "dancing dwarf of the god from the land of spirits", in a letter to a slave trade expedition leader. In the Iliad, Homer described the "pygmies" as dark-skinned men who had to engage in annual warfare against cranes on the banks of the world-encircling river Oceanus. Contemporary Greek sources describe them as being as tall as a "pygme", meaning that they measured the length of an elbow to a knuckle, or about one and a half feet long. About three centuries later in 500 BCE, the Greek Herodotus reported that an explorer had seen, while travelling along the West African Coast, "dwarfish people, who used clothing made from the palm tree".

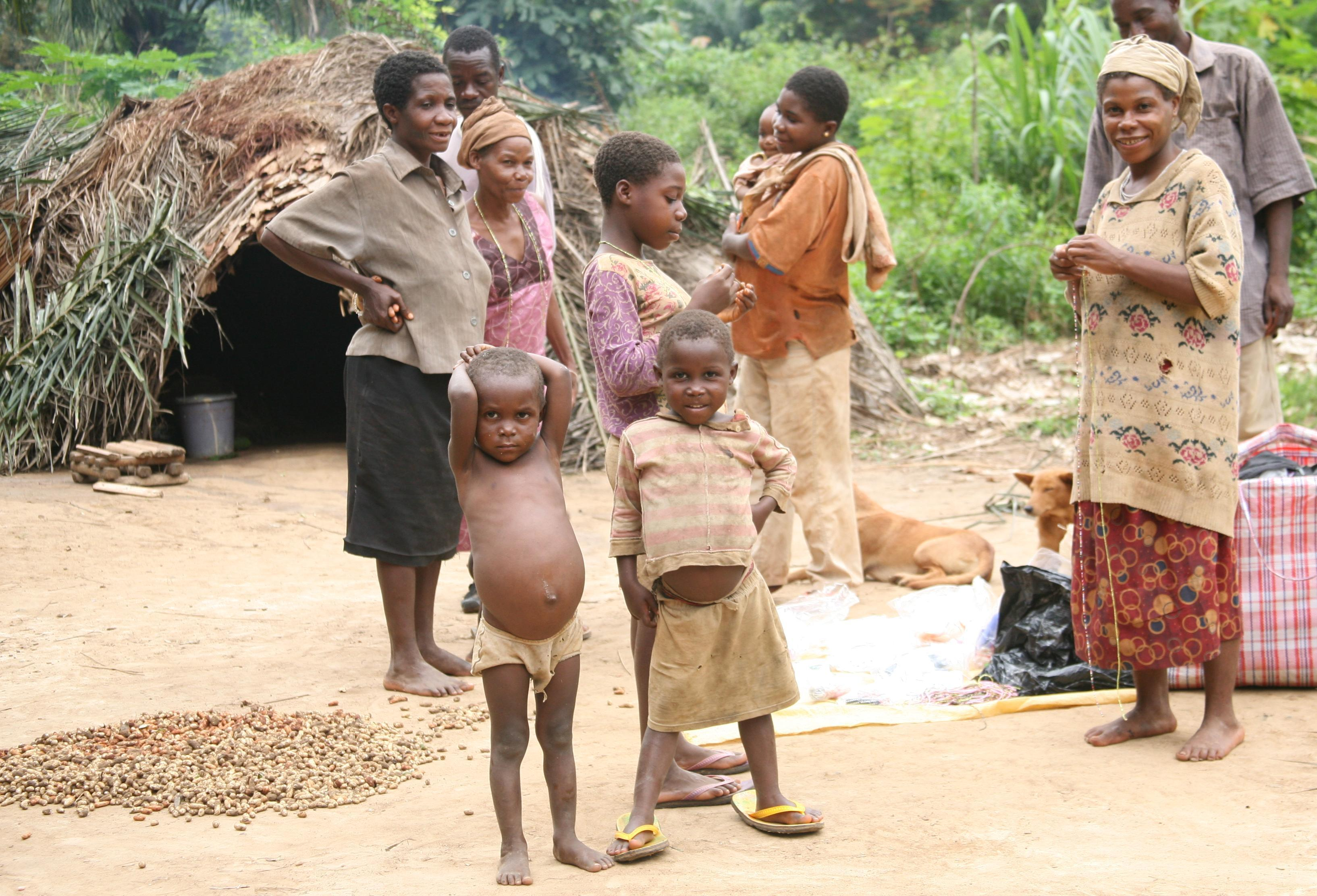
Some Baka near their village in the jungles of eastern Cameroon (2008).

In 1995, Joan Mark wrote The King of the World in the Land of the Pygmies, an interpretive biography of Patrick Tracy Lowell Putnam, the anthropologist who spent 25 years living among the Bambuti people in Zaire. Mark writes that Aristotle, in 340 BCE was the first to relate, in his Historia Animalium, the small men Homer accounted for in the Iliad, to those seen previously on the African coast. He goes on to explain that, due to the chasm that existed between Europe and Africa after the collapse of the Roman Empire, most Europeans living in the 18th century believed "pygmies" to be creatures of myth.

In 1890, the Welsh journalist Henry Stanley gave, according to anthropologist Paul Raffaele, the first modern account of the existence of such people. In his book, In Darkest Africa, Stanley described meeting a "pygmy" couple. Stanley writes of them: "In him was a mimicked dignity, as of Adam; in her the womanliness of a miniature Eve".

In 1906, a Congolese "pygmy" named Ota Benga was exhibited among apes at the Bronx Zoo in New York City. Ota was 4 feet and 11 inches tall. This episode is still extremely controversial in the early 21st century, as evidenced by a New York Times article about Ota published in 2006, which described this episode as "a perfect illustration of the racism that pervaded New York at the time." According to the Times, black clergyman and superintendent of the Howard Colored Orphan Asylum in Brooklyn, Reverend James H. Gordon, deemed the exhibit to be racist and demeaning. "Our race, we think, is depressed enough, without exhibiting one of us with the apes," Mr. Gordon said. "We think we are worthy of being considered human beings, with souls."

== Culture ==
=== Hunting and gathering ===
The Baka people are considered the principal hunter-gatherers of the tropical rainforest of Central West Africa. However, no group has been shown to subsist entirely on foraging. Groups establish temporary camps of huts constructed of bowed branches covered in large leaves (though today more and more homes are constructed following other methods, such as mud and mud brick).

The Baka hunt and gather their own food. The men hunt and trap in the surrounding forest, using poisoned arrows and spears to great effect. The men also welcome the help of dogs when going on hunting excursions.

Fishing is very important in Baka culture as young boys are taught to use fishing rods at a young age. The men fish using chemicals obtained from crushed plant material. Using fast-moving river water, they disperse the chemical downstream. This non-toxic chemical deprives fish of oxygen, making them float to the surface and easily collected by Baka men. Another method of fishing, performed generally only by women, is dam fishing, in which water is removed from a dammed area and fish are taken from the exposed ground. Children and adolescent-girls often accompany the women when they go fish-bailing in nearby streams. More than only fishing with adults, their job is also to help the women by watching over the infants while they fish. Women cultivate plants, such as plantains, cassavas and bananas, and practice beekeeping. The group remains in one area until it is hunted out. It then abandons the camp and settles down in a different portion of the forest. The group is communal and makes decisions by consensus.

During the dry season, it is common for the Baka to move and set camp within the forest in order to facilitate fishing and overall nutritional gathering. The Baka are the most active during these dry seasons. Men hunt from dawn until dusk and the women gather two types of fruits: the "mabe" and the "peke", which are used for the provision of juice and nuts. The Baka people continue to monitor bee activity in order to obtain honey or "poki".

=== Religion and belief systems ===
The Baka worship the forest spirit called Jengi (also known as Djengui or Ejengi). The spirit plays the role of the mediator between the supreme being, Komba, and the Baka people. The Baka thus compare Jengi to a protecting father or guardian. They strongly believe and revere Jengi as they believe that he is the only way to Komba. The Baka people believe Jengi to be omnipresent within the forest allowing him to punish transgressors within the confines of the forest. Ultimately, the Baka worship nature as it is Komba, not Jengi, that resides in it.

After hunting successfully, the Baka worship Jengi with songs of thanksgiving and dancing in a ritual called Luma. These rituals are necessary for Jengi to appear before the Baka, as they believe that he only shows himself when harmony reigns among the villagers. Jengi also appears during the important ceremony, Jengi, where a young man goes from being a boy to a man. During these ceremonies, young Baka men volunteer to be initiated by Jengi. Once they are initiated, they have the right to live and walk freely within the sacred forest. This secret ceremony was studied by anthropologist, Mauro Campagnoli, who claims having been able to partake. Journalist Paul Raffaele describes his experience with Jengi:

Emerging from the shadows were half a dozen Baka men accompanying a creature swathed from top to bottom in strips of russet-hued raffia. It had no features, no limbs, no face. "It's Ejengi," said Wasse, his voice trembling. At first I was sure it was a Pygmy camouflaged in foliage, but as Ejengi glided across the darkened clearing, the drums beat louder and faster, and as the Pygmies' chanting grew more frenzied, I began to doubt my own eyes.

Death is considered to be a misfortune for the Baka. They deem the death of one of their own to be a representation of spiritual discord. Each tribe, having witnessed the death of one of their own, is required to pray to Jengi and dance around the debris covered corpse for an entire night. The dance performed during the death rituals is called the Mbouamboua. After a long night of dancing, the villagers depart from where they were stationed, leaving the corpse behind, and set out to move somewhere else in order to flee the curse.

== Traditional medicine ==
Traditional Baka medicine mainly involves herbal remedies. Various plants may be brewed or mashed into a pulp to treat various illnesses or infertility. These remedies are often used on children, as the areas where they are most used have high child mortality rates. While the efficacy of these remedies has not been proven, this traditional medicine is so renowned that even non-Baka seek out their healers for treatment.

Many Baka people have had ebola but none have been reported to have displayed any symptoms.

== Challenges ==
=== Relations ===
In socio-economic and political spheres, the Baka people are not seen as equal to the Bantu villagers. The Baka rely on the farmers for trade opportunities. They exchange some of their primary goods (fruits, wild nuts, medicinal plants etc.) for money and industrial goods. The farmers are the Baka’s only connection to the modern Cameroonian or Gabonese bureaucracies. Because of this, the Baka often work as indentured servants to the farmers. The Baka thus follow most of the farmers’ orders. This unbalanced relationship often causes tensions between the two groups. These inequalities are perpetuated by the fact that some of the villagers speak French (the national language of Cameroon and Gabon) but none of the Baka do.

=== Lack of rights ===
The Baka People form an acephalous society, one in which there are no political leaders or hierarchies. This makes it difficult for the Baka to assimilate to the political landscapes of Gabon and Cameroon. According to anthropologist Alec Leonhardt, the Baka people are deprived of their human rights; Leonhardt explains that the fight for Baka rights is not on Cameroon and Gabon's political agendas and neither is it on the "policy agenda" of the UN, despite their drafting of a Declaration on the Rights of Indigenous Peoples, a document whose purpose is to fight for the rights of indigenous peoples throughout the world.

==== Rights to education ====
Being hunter-gatherers as opposed to farmers, and semi-nomadic, the Baka are challenged when education is concerned. Because the Baka are an ethnic minority in both Cameroon and Gabon, they are often either excluded from their respective school systems or forced to forgo their culture and assimilate to a Bantu-normative way of life. Formal schooling for Baka youth can often be difficult for them to handle because it conflicts with the semi-nomadic Baka traditional lifestyle.

According to anthropologist Kamei Nabutaka, although there are public schools for all children, the Baka often choose not to attend because formal classroom education is generally not a central part of Baka culture. Secondly, she explains that the Baka choose not to attend school due to their physical distance from these schools, as most of the formal schools are built outside of Baka settlements. The Baka also tend to feel uncomfortable in these public schools, as their physical difference from Bantu schoolmates makes them a target for discrimination and bullying. Furthermore, Baka children may not feel at ease when attending school due to language barriers, as the only languages accepted within these schools are French and Bantu languages. Kamei also describes economic barriers to Baka children's school attendance; while schools are public, there are still costs associated with attendance (such as textbooks and school uniforms), and Baka parents are often unable to afford these costs, as only a minority of Baka society regularly has liquid cash.

=== Deforestation ===
In recent years, deforestation of the tropical forest has greatly increased. For example, some deforestation projects have been initiated in order to procure palm oil which is heavily found within the confines of the forest. Survival International has recently set up an initiative to help the Baka people survive the extreme deforestation of their homes.

Deforestation impacts the Baka significantly, as the forest is their home. Anthropologist Shiho Hattori recorded about 100 instruments that the Baka use daily for cooking, hunting and gathering, rituals, and so on. Out of these 100 utensils, Hattori reports that 40 (or about two-fifths) of these utensils were made "partly or entirely out of natural resources" found in the forest. These deforestation projects can be extremely detrimental to the Baka, as they destroy the environment on which they so heavily rely for subsistence, as well as for their economic standing in face of Bantu farming communities.

== Nonprofit efforts ==
The Catholic missionary group Frères des Ecoles Chrétiennes (FEC) set up an initiative to support Baka youth entering the formal education system through the creation of the Mapala School in 1992. The FEC encouraged Baka teachers to teach in both French and Baka languages. Parents were also able to pay lower tuition 500 FC (or about one US dollar), and their children were able to learn skills relevant to the Baka lifestyle during class time. This initiative helped lessen the cultural gap between the Baka and the Bantu.

In 1998, the Jengi Project, a conservation project, was initiated in order to protect three important regions of the forest: Lobeke, Boumba (also Bek) and Nki. Project leaders set up measures in order to attain their goal of conserving the richness, in species and in foliage, of the tropical forest. One of these measures, for example, was an increase of hunting regulations within the forest. These leaders attempted to get the Baka on board with the project as these new regulations would not only help them preserve their natural habitat but would also affect their living tendencies. The concerned Baka group, however, was not very responsive and did not seem to want to partake in the project. The farmers, on the other hand, seemed to be very intent on doing their part to support the effort. Anthropologist Hittori, suspects that the Baka may have been indifferent to the project as they believed that this was simply another way for the farmers to increase their dominance over them.

== Threats from conservation projects ==
Protected Areas have been created on the Baka's ancestral lands in the Congo Basin. According to Survival International, park rangers, funded and equipped by big conservation organizations (like the World Wildlife Fund (WWF) and African Parks) have harassed, raped, beaten, tortured and killed the Baka. After reports of abuses, the United Nations Development Programme carried out a report into the proposed 1,345 sq km Messok Dja national park in the Republic of the Congo. It found that the Baka were in a state of "deep distress" and that there was "credible evidence of violence against the Baka people. In May 2025, African Parks admitted that its rangers carried out human rights abuses against the Baka.

== See also ==
- Baka Beyond
- Bwiti
- Demographics of Cameroon
- Pygmy music

Other Pygmy groups:

- Aka people
- Mbuti
- Twa peoples

Researchers who studied Pygmy culture:

- Colin Turnbull
- Mauro Campagnoli
