= Bikele =

- Bikelé (place): town in Estuaire Province in northwestern Gabon
- Bikélé (people): ethnic group in Cameroon
- Bikélé language: another name for Kol language (Cameroon)
