= Nkok =

- Town
- Location in Gabon
- Coordinates: 0°23′37″N 9°36′43″E
- Country: Gabon
- Province: Estuaire Province
- Department: Komo-Mondah Department
- Time zone: UTC+1 (WAT)

Nkok is a small town in Estuaire Province in northwestern Gabon. It lies along the N1 road, 21.8 kilometres by road east of Libreville, between Bikelé and Nkoltang.
