= Batrachorhina miredoxa =

Scientific classification
- Kingdom: Animalia
- Phylum: Arthropoda
- Clade: Pancrustacea
- Class: Insecta
- Order: Coleoptera
- Suborder: Polyphaga
- Infraorder: Cucujiformia
- Family: Cerambycidae
- Genus: Batrachorhina
- Species: B. miredoxa

Binomial name
- Batrachorhina miredoxa Téocchi, 1986

Synonyms
- Batrachorhina mirei Breuning, 1977 nec Breuning, 1969

Species of beetle

Batrachorhina miredoxa is a species of beetle in the family Cerambycidae. It was described by Pierre Téocchi in 1986. It has been found in the Mondah Forest in Gabon and near the village of Nsimeyong in Cameroon.
