= Ngoulmakong =

Village in East Cameroon

Ngoulmakong Sambe
- Location in Cameroon
- Coordinates: 3°49′33″N 12°44′30″E
- Country: Cameroon
- region: East
- Divisions: Haut-Nyong
- commune: Messaména
- Elevation: 650 m (2,130 ft)

Population (2005)
  - Total: 446
  - Ethnicities: Bikélé
  - Religions: Christian
- Climate: Aw

Ngoulmakong is a village in East Cameroon, Haut-Nyong Division, Messamena Sub-Division.

== Name ==
In the dominant local language, Bikélé, the name of the village is Nkoulmokouang. The official form Ngoulmakong was given under colonial rule due to influence from Bulu.

The colloquial name Sambe, which is more usually used locally than Ngoulmakong, derives from the name of a type of tree (Sterculia subviolacea) found in the region of the Nyong River, whose hard wood was reputedly used for weapon-making. It is thought that the name originally belonged to a settlement nearer the river, but the settlement was moved to the present site of Ngoulmakong and the name was transferred with it.

== Population ==
In 1966–1967, the village Ngoulmakong had 383 inhabitants, of the Bikélé ethnic group.

According to the 2005 census, the village had 446 inhabitants.

== Characteristics ==
In 1966–67, the village had a regular market, a dispensary, and a state school covering the full school cycle. As of 2020, the village has a primary school, secondary school (CES), and a medical centre (CSI).

Ngoulmakong is the seat of the chief of the Bikélé North ethnic group.

The economy is dominated by subsistence farming of food crops and cash-cropping of cocoa and coffee.

== Gallery ==
Ngoulmakong

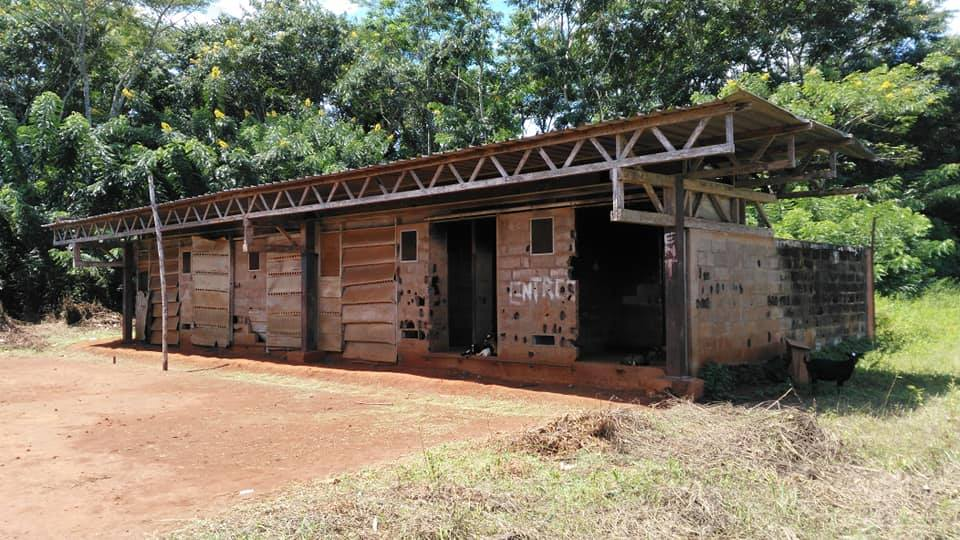
Primary school in Ngoulmakong

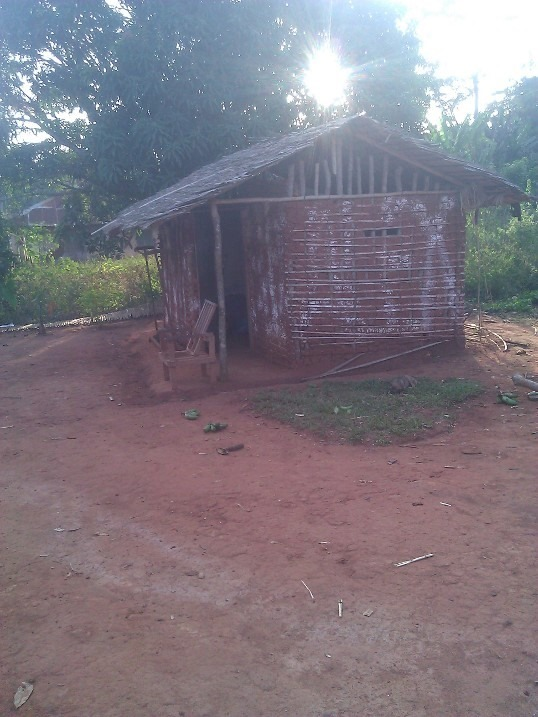
House in Ngoulmakong

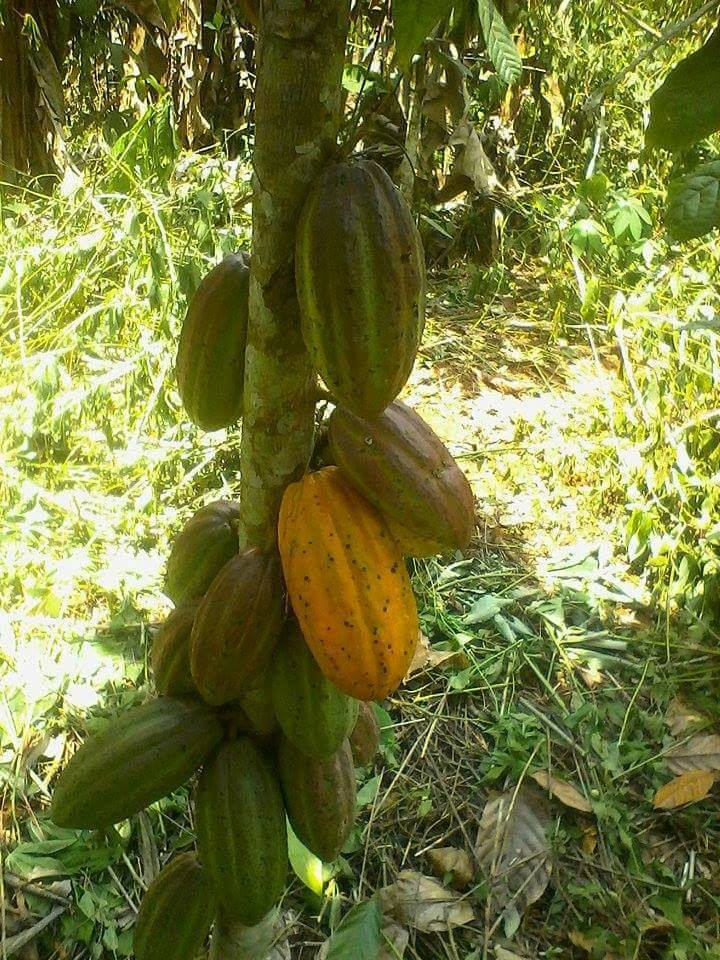
Cocoa tree in Ngoulmakong
