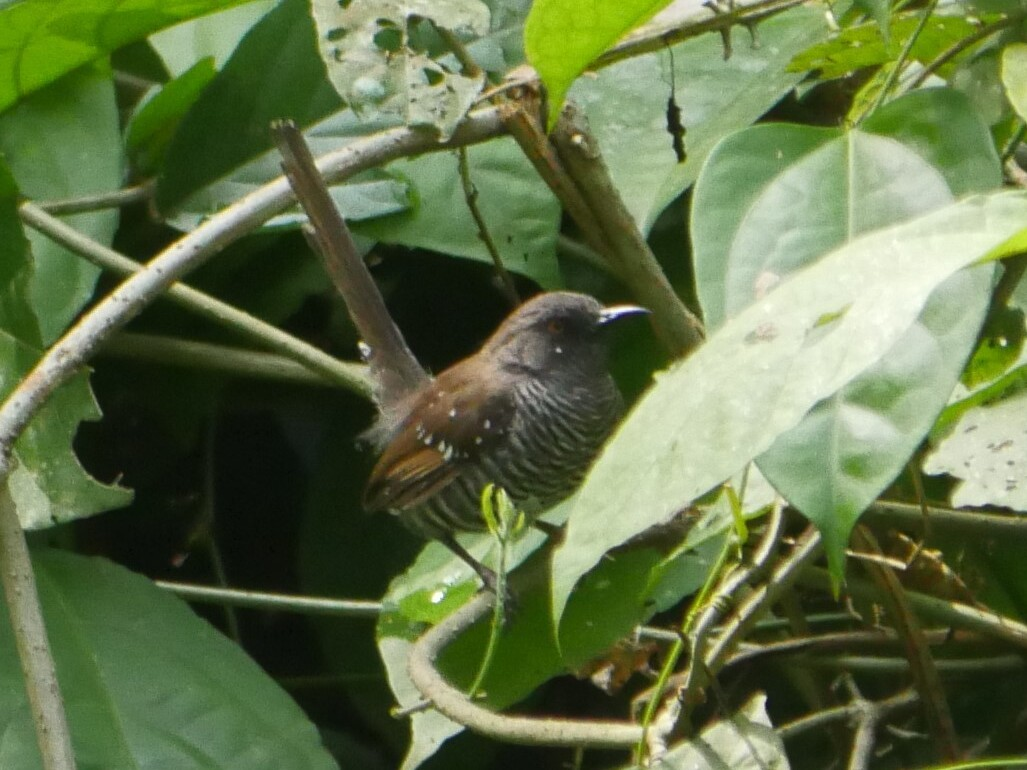

Conservation status
- Least Concern (IUCN 3.1)

Scientific classification
- Kingdom: Animalia
- Phylum: Chordata
- Class: Aves
- Order: Passeriformes
- Family: Cisticolidae
- Genus: Prinia
- Species: P. bairdii

Binomial name
- Prinia bairdii (Cassin, 1855)

= Banded prinia =

Species of bird

The banded prinia (Prinia bairdii) is a species of bird in the family Cisticolidae. It is native to central Africa. Its natural habitats are subtropical or tropical moist lowland forest and subtropical or tropical moist montane forest.

== Taxonomy ==
The banded prinia was formally described in 1855 by the American ornithologist John Cassin based on a specimen that had been collected by the French-American naturalist Paul Du Chaillu near the Mondah River in northwest Gabon. Cassin coined the binomial name Drymoica bairdii where the specific epithet was chosen to honour the naturalist and museum curator Spencer Fullerton Baird. The banded prinia is now one of 29 species placed in the genus Prinia that was introduced by the American naturalist Thomas Horsfield in 1821.

Four subspecies are recognised:

- P. b. bairdii (Cassin, 1855) – southeast Nigeria to Congo and east to northeast DR Congo and west Uganda
- P. b. heinrichi Meise, 1958 – northwest Angola
- P. b. obscura (Neumann, 1908) – east DR Congo, west Uganda, Burundi and Rwanda
- P. b. melanops (Reichenow & Neumann, 1895) – east Uganda and west Kenya

The subspecies P. b. melanops and P. b. obscura have sometimes been considered as a separate species, the black-faced prinia.
