= Donguila =

- Village
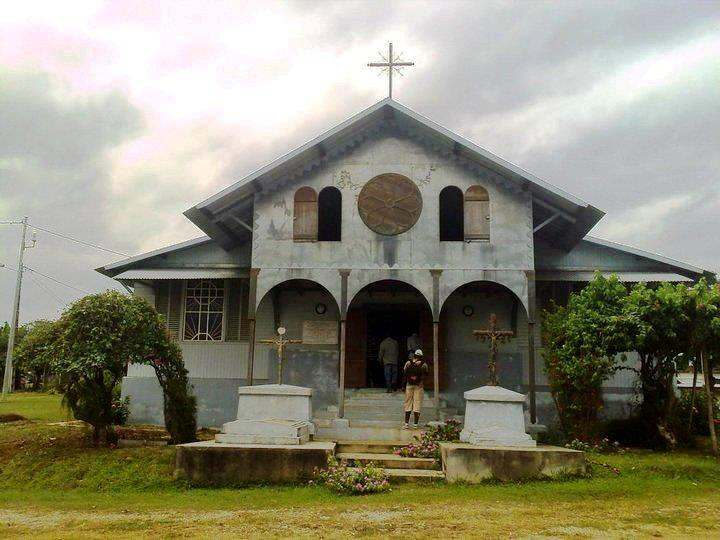

- Location in Gabon
- Coordinates: 0°13′N 9°45′E
- Country: Gabon
- Province: Estuaire Province
- Department: Komo-Mondah Department

Population (1993)
  - Total: 600
- Time zone: UTC+1 (WAT)

Donguila (also Dongila; or Douglas) is a coastal village in Estuaire Province in northwestern Gabon. It lies along the L106 road (Nzamlique-Donguila road), 16 kilometres by road south of Nzamaligué. Donguila is best known for St. Paul Catholic mission founded in 1878, opposite the Pointe Denis. The general population speaks the Mekeh variant of the Fanghish language. Though found in several neighboring countries, the main type locality of the rodent, Peters's Hybomys, is Donguila.

== History ==
Education was part of the social activities of missionaries. At Donguila, there was a school for boys, another for girls, and a vocational school for "apprentices". Young boys were given an essentially moral and religious instruction; secondarily they learned to read and write French. The girls were given an introduction to housework, sewing and embroidery. Léon M'ba originated from the Fang clans who attended the Donguila's Libreville mission schools. The French Roman Catholic archbishop, Marcel Lefebvre, served at the mission station from 1940–1943. Today, the Mission of St. Paul and its primary school continue to receive young Gabonese.

While exploring Gabon, the English writer and explorer Mary Kingsley, is known to have moored her boat at Donguila. In the early 1970s, Félix Houphouët-Boigny persuaded his protégé, Omar Bongo, to give Donguila farm (plantation) to Bob Denard. In the 1980s, Donguila and three other remote villages with populations of 1000–1500, Bougandji, Nyali, and Bolossoville, were selected as solar energy test sites, each receiving PV-powered public service systems. Jean Obame was the village chief in the 2000s.

== Geography and climate ==
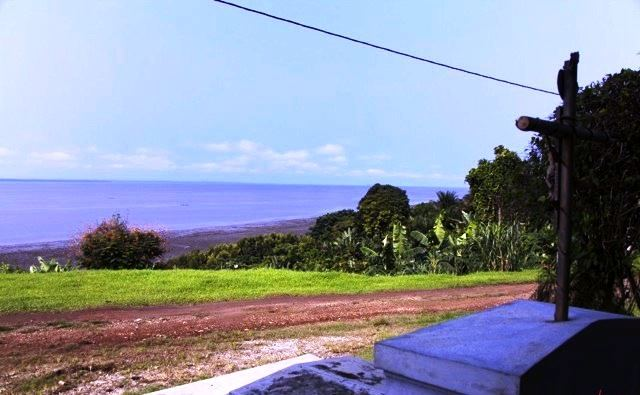
Komo River estuary at Donguila

The village of Donguila is located on the right bank of the Komo River. The north bank, from the Ikoi River to Dongila is fronted by large banks of sand, rocks, and mud, while the land is elevated, and covered with trees and vegetation. The village is situated about 12 miles (19 km) eastward of the island, Île Coniquet, and 67.4 kilometres (41.9 mi) by road southeast of Libreville. It is a within the rural area of the Gabon Estuary. Surprise Rocks lie in the middle of the entrance to Komo River, about 2.5 miles (4.0 km) from Dongila.

Mangrove swamp forms a significant part of the surrounding landscape. Donguila consists of many small villages, the most important are Nyantsobe, Mbol Ezok, Saint Henri Le Four à Chaud (Aufourachaud), Mekome, and Edzoung Alenga. Approximately 6,000 square feet (560 m^{2}) in size, the Plantation Donguila is part of the Catholic Mission Donguila; it is also located on the right bank of the estuary at the entrance of the Komo River.

The climate is equatorial, hot and humid characterized by the alternation of four seasons: the short rainy season (mid-September, mid-December) the short dry season (mid-December, late January), the long rainy season (late January-mid May), and the long dry season (mid-May-mid September).

== Notable people ==
- Léon M'ba (1902–1967), first Prime Minister (1959–1961) and President (1961–1967) of Gabon
- Paul Biyoghé Mba (b. 1953), Prime Minister of Gabon (2009–2012)
- Simone Saint-Dénis (1930–2008), trade union leader taught at the Catholic School in the 1950s.
