= Bikelé (place) =

- Town
- Location in Gabon
- Coordinates: 0°24′N 9°34′E
- Country: Gabon
- Province: Estuaire Province
- Department: Komo-Mondah Department
- Time zone: UTC+1 (WAT)

Bikelé is a small town in Estuaire Province in northwestern Gabon. It is the capital of the district of the same name. It lies along the N1 road, 18 kilometres by road east of Libreville. Nearby settlements include Bambouchine, Bizango Bi Bere, Essassa, Nkok and Nkoltang.
