= Batrachorhina induta =

Scientific classification
- Kingdom: Animalia
- Phylum: Arthropoda
- Class: Insecta
- Order: Coleoptera
- Suborder: Polyphaga
- Infraorder: Cucujiformia
- Family: Cerambycidae
- Genus: Batrachorhina
- Species: B. induta

Binomial name
- Batrachorhina induta (Fairmaire, 1902)

Species of beetle

Batrachorhina induta is a species of beetle in the family Cerambycidae. It was described by Léon Fairmaire in 1902. It is known from Madagascar.
