= Batrachorhina vulpina =

Scientific classification
- Domain: Eukaryota
- Kingdom: Animalia
- Phylum: Arthropoda
- Class: Insecta
- Order: Coleoptera
- Suborder: Polyphaga
- Infraorder: Cucujiformia
- Family: Cerambycidae
- Tribe: Pteropliini
- Genus: Batrachorhina
- Species: B. vulpina

Binomial name
- Batrachorhina vulpina (Klug, 1833)

Synonyms
- Madecops denticollis Fairmaire, 1898; Saperda vulpina Klug, 1833

Species of beetle

Batrachorhina vulpina is a species of beetle in the family Cerambycidae. It was originally described in 1833 by Johann Christoph Friedrich Klug under the genus Saperda. It is known from Réunion and Mauritius.

== Subspecies ==
- Batrachorhina vulpina denticollis (Fairmaire, 1898)
- Batrachorhina vulpina vulpina (Klug, 1833)
