= Batrachorhina niviscutata =

Scientific classification
- Domain: Eukaryota
- Kingdom: Animalia
- Phylum: Arthropoda
- Class: Insecta
- Order: Coleoptera
- Suborder: Polyphaga
- Infraorder: Cucujiformia
- Family: Cerambycidae
- Tribe: Pteropliini
- Genus: Batrachorhina
- Species: B. niviscutata

Binomial name
- Batrachorhina niviscutata (Fabricius, 1901)

Species of beetle

Batrachorhina niviscutata is a species of beetle in the family Cerambycidae. It was described by Johan Christian Fabricius in 1901. It is known from Madagascar.
