= Batrachorhina approximata =

Scientific classification
- Kingdom: Animalia
- Phylum: Arthropoda
- Class: Insecta
- Order: Coleoptera
- Suborder: Polyphaga
- Infraorder: Cucujiformia
- Family: Cerambycidae
- Genus: Batrachorhina
- Species: B. approximata

Binomial name
- Batrachorhina approximata Breuning, 1940

Synonyms
- Batrachorhina (Soridus) approximata Breuning, 1940

Species of beetle

Batrachorhina approximata is a species of longhorn beetle (family Cerambycidae) in the subfamily Lamiinae. It was described by Stephan von Breuning in 1940. It is known from Chyulu Hills, Kenya.
