= Batrachorhina medioalba =

Scientific classification
- Kingdom: Animalia
- Phylum: Arthropoda
- Clade: Pancrustacea
- Class: Insecta
- Order: Coleoptera
- Suborder: Polyphaga
- Infraorder: Cucujiformia
- Family: Cerambycidae
- Genus: Batrachorhina
- Species: B. medioalba

Binomial name
- Batrachorhina medioalba Breuning, 1970

Species of beetle

Batrachorhina medioalba is a species of beetle in the family Cerambycidae. It was described by Stephan von Breuning in 1970. It is known from Madagascar.

== Taxonomy ==
Batrachorhina medioalba belongs to the subfamily Lamiinae and tribe Pteropliini of the longhorn beetle family Cerambycidae. It is placed in the subgenus Coedomea within the genus Batrachorhina.

The species was described by Stephan von Breuning in 1970. It is recorded from Madagascar and is included in checklists of the Pteropliini fauna of the Madagascan region. A specialist catalogue of Madagascan Pteropliini likewise lists Batrachorhina (Coedomea) medioalba among the species of the region.
