= Ntoum =

Ntoum Nkan
- Town
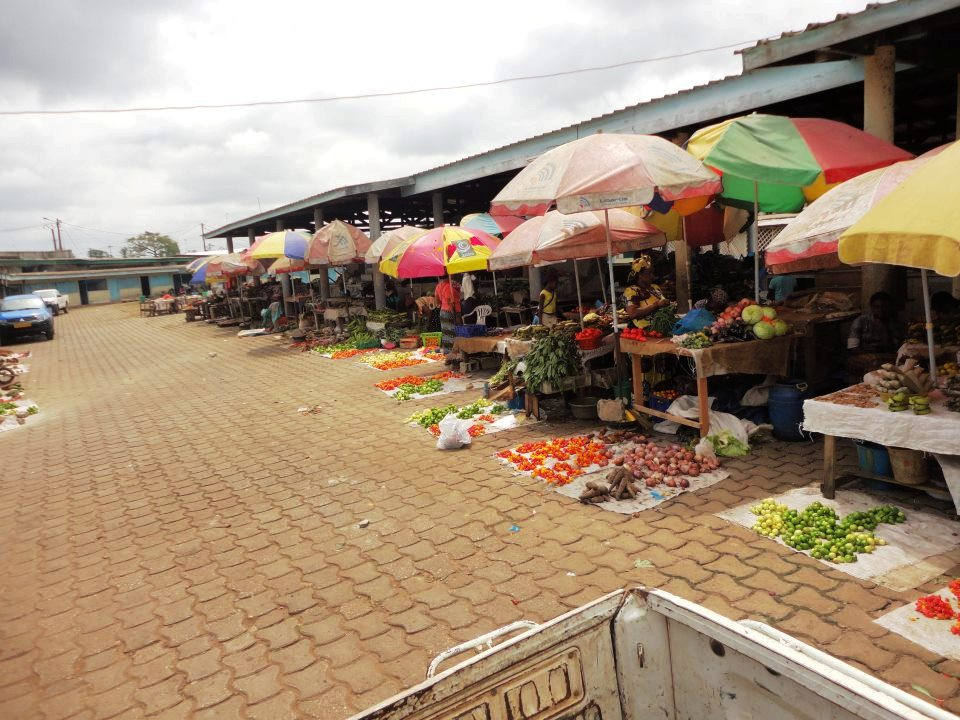

- Location in Gabon
- Coordinates: 0°23′4″N 9°45′14″E
- Country: Gabon
- Province: Estuaire Province
- Department: Komo-Mondah

Population (2013)
  - Total: 51,954
- Time zone: UTC+1 (WAT)

Ntoum or Nkan is a town in Estuaire Province in northwestern Gabon. It is the capital of the Komo-Mondah Department. Nkan lies along the N1 road and L106 road, 39.2 kilometres by road east of Libreville and 12.2 kilometres north of Nzamaligue.

== Demographics ==
In the 2013 census it had a population of 51,954. In the 1993 census it had a population of 6,188 and in 2012 an estimated population of 11,754.

== Transport ==
It is served by Nkan Airport. It is located on the Trans-Gabon Railway and is the proposed junction for the line to the iron ore exporting port of Santa Clara.

== Industry ==
Ntoum has an integrated cement plant.
