= Batrachorhina similis =

Scientific classification
- Kingdom: Animalia
- Phylum: Arthropoda
- Class: Insecta
- Order: Coleoptera
- Suborder: Polyphaga
- Infraorder: Cucujiformia
- Family: Cerambycidae
- Genus: Batrachorhina
- Species: B. similis

Binomial name
- Batrachorhina similis Breuning, 1938

Species of beetle

Batrachorhina similis is a species of beetle in the family Cerambycidae. It was described by Stephan von Breuning in 1938.

== Subspecies ==
- Batrachorhina similis similis Breuning, 1938
- Batrachorhina similis supplementaria Breuning, 1970
