= Batrachorhina lichenea =

Scientific classification
- Kingdom: Animalia
- Phylum: Arthropoda
- Class: Insecta
- Order: Coleoptera
- Suborder: Polyphaga
- Infraorder: Cucujiformia
- Family: Cerambycidae
- Genus: Batrachorhina
- Species: B. lichenea

Binomial name
- Batrachorhina lichenea (Fairmaire, 1902)

Synonyms
- Batrachorhina picta Breuning, 1947; Coedomaea lichenea Fairmaire, 1902

Species of beetle

Batrachorhina lichenea is a species of beetle in the family Cerambycidae. It was described by Léon Fairmaire in 1902. It is known from Madagascar.
