= Nzamaligué =

- Village
- Location in Gabon
- Coordinates: 0°19′N 9°46′E
- Country: Gabon
- Province: Estuaire Province
- Department: Komo-Mondah Department
- Time zone: UTC+1 (WAT)

Nzamaligué is a village in Estuaire Province in northwestern Gabon . It lies along the L106 road (Nzamlique-Donguila road), 16 kilometres by road northeast of Donguila and 12.2 kilometres south of Nkam.

== Notable people ==
- Casimir Oyé Mba (1942-2021)
