= Batrachorhina griseotincta =

Scientific classification
- Domain: Eukaryota
- Kingdom: Animalia
- Phylum: Arthropoda
- Class: Insecta
- Order: Coleoptera
- Suborder: Polyphaga
- Infraorder: Cucujiformia
- Family: Cerambycidae
- Tribe: Pteropliini
- Genus: Batrachorhina
- Subgenus: Trichocoedomea
- Species: B. griseotincta

Binomial name
- Batrachorhina griseotincta (Fairmaire, 1904)

Synonyms
- Caedomaea griseotincta Fairmaire, 1904

Species of beetle

Batrachorhina griseotincta is a species of beetle in the family Cerambycidae. It was described by Léon Fairmaire in 1904.

== Subspecies ==
- B. g. fuscosignata Breuning,
- B. g. griseotincta (Fairmaire, 1904)
