= Nkoltang =

- Town
- Location in Gabon
- Coordinates: 0°22′36″N 9°38′22″E
- Country: Gabon
- Province: Estuaire Province
- Department: Komo-Mondah Department
- Time zone: UTC+1 (WAT)

Nkoltang is a small town in Estuaire Province in northwestern Gabon. It lies along the N1 road, 25.6 kilometres by road east of Libreville, and 13.8 kilometres by road west of Ntoum.
