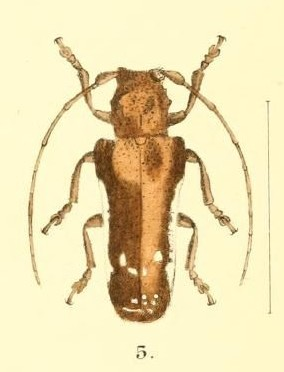

Scientific classification
- Domain: Eukaryota
- Kingdom: Animalia
- Phylum: Arthropoda
- Class: Insecta
- Order: Coleoptera
- Suborder: Polyphaga
- Infraorder: Cucujiformia
- Family: Cerambycidae
- Tribe: Pteropliini
- Genus: Batrachorhina
- Species: B. albolateralis

Binomial name
- Batrachorhina albolateralis (Waterhouse, 1882)

Synonyms
- Coedomea blucheaui Fairmaire, 1904; Dioristus albolateralis Waterhouse, 1882

= Batrachorhina albolateralis =

Species of beetle

Batrachorhina albolateralis is a species of beetle in the family Cerambycidae. It was described by Waterhouse in 1882, originally under the genus Dioristus. It is known from Madagascar.
