= Batrachorhina biapicata =

Scientific classification
- Domain: Eukaryota
- Kingdom: Animalia
- Phylum: Arthropoda
- Class: Insecta
- Order: Coleoptera
- Suborder: Polyphaga
- Infraorder: Cucujiformia
- Family: Cerambycidae
- Tribe: Pteropliini
- Genus: Batrachorhina
- Species: B. biapicata

Binomial name
- Batrachorhina biapicata (Chevrolat, 1857)

Synonyms
- Batrachorhina rugiscapa Breuning, 1938; Soridus biapicatus Gahan, 1890; Sthenias baccilarius Lameere, 1893; Xylorhiza biapicata Chevrolat, 1857

Species of beetle

Batrachorhina biapicata is a species of beetle in the family Cerambycidae. It was described by Louis Alexandre Auguste Chevrolat in 1857.
