= Batrachorhina vagepicta =

Scientific classification
- Kingdom: Animalia
- Phylum: Arthropoda
- Class: Insecta
- Order: Coleoptera
- Suborder: Polyphaga
- Infraorder: Cucujiformia
- Family: Cerambycidae
- Genus: Batrachorhina
- Species: B. vagepicta

Binomial name
- Batrachorhina vagepicta (Fairmaire, 1901)

Synonyms
- Coedomea perrieri Fairmaire, 1903; Coedomea vagepicta Fairmaire, 1901

Species of beetle

Batrachorhina vagepicta is a species of beetle in the family Cerambycidae. It was described by Léon Fairmaire in 1901, originally under the genus Coedomea. It is known from Madagascar.
