= Batrachorhina nervulata =

Scientific classification
- Kingdom: Animalia
- Phylum: Arthropoda
- Class: Insecta
- Order: Coleoptera
- Suborder: Polyphaga
- Infraorder: Cucujiformia
- Family: Cerambycidae
- Genus: Batrachorhina
- Species: B. nervulata

Binomial name
- Batrachorhina nervulata (Fairmaire, 1894)

Synonyms
- Tigrana nervulata Fairmaire, 1894

Species of beetle

Batrachorhina nervulata is a species of beetle in the family Cerambycidae. It was described by Léon Fairmaire in 1894. It is known from Madagascar, where it has existed since the Upper Pleistocene. It feeds on Hymenaea verrucosa. It contains the varietas Batrachorhina nervulata var. drappieri.
