= Batrachorhina madagascariensis =

Scientific classification
- Domain: Eukaryota
- Kingdom: Animalia
- Phylum: Arthropoda
- Class: Insecta
- Order: Coleoptera
- Suborder: Polyphaga
- Infraorder: Cucujiformia
- Family: Cerambycidae
- Tribe: Pteropliini
- Genus: Batrachorhina
- Species: B. madagascariensis

Binomial name
- Batrachorhina madagascariensis (Thomson, 1868)

Synonyms
- Batrachorhina fuscoplagiata Breuning, 1942; Batrachorhina mediofasciata Breuning, 1942; Coedomaea madagascarensis Thomson, 1868

Species of beetle

Batrachorhina madagascariensis is a species of beetle in the family Cerambycidae. It was described by James Thomson in 1868. It is known from Madagascar.
