= Batrachorhina niveoscutellata =

Scientific classification
- Kingdom: Animalia
- Phylum: Arthropoda
- Class: Insecta
- Order: Coleoptera
- Suborder: Polyphaga
- Infraorder: Cucujiformia
- Family: Cerambycidae
- Genus: Batrachorhina
- Species: B. niveoscutellata

Binomial name
- Batrachorhina niveoscutellata Breuning, 1940

Species of beetle

Batrachorhina niveoscutellata is a species of beetle in the family Cerambycidae. It was described by Stephan von Breuning in 1940.

== Subspecies ==
- Batrachorhina niveoscutellata dilacerata Breuning,
- Batrachorhina niveoscutellata niveoscutellata Breuning, 1940
