= Batrachorhina nebulosa =

Scientific classification
- Kingdom: Animalia
- Phylum: Arthropoda
- Class: Insecta
- Order: Coleoptera
- Suborder: Polyphaga
- Infraorder: Cucujiformia
- Family: Cerambycidae
- Genus: Batrachorhina
- Species: B. nebulosa

Binomial name
- Batrachorhina nebulosa (Fairmaire, 1904)

Species of beetle

Batrachorhina nebulosa is a species of beetle in the family Cerambycidae. It was described by Léon Fairmaire in 1904. It is known from Madagascar.
