= Batrachorhina jejuna =

Scientific classification
- Domain: Eukaryota
- Kingdom: Animalia
- Phylum: Arthropoda
- Class: Insecta
- Order: Coleoptera
- Suborder: Polyphaga
- Infraorder: Cucujiformia
- Family: Cerambycidae
- Tribe: Pteropliini
- Genus: Batrachorhina
- Species: B. jejuna

Binomial name
- Batrachorhina jejuna Kolbe, 1894

Species of beetle

Batrachorhina jejuna is a species of beetle in the family Cerambycidae. It was described by Hermann Julius Kolbe in 1894. It is known from Tanzania, Kenya, and South Africa.
