= Batrachorhina tanganjicae =

Scientific classification
- Kingdom: Animalia
- Phylum: Arthropoda
- Class: Insecta
- Order: Coleoptera
- Suborder: Polyphaga
- Infraorder: Cucujiformia
- Family: Cerambycidae
- Genus: Batrachorhina
- Species: B. tanganjicae

Binomial name
- Batrachorhina tanganjicae Breuning, 1961

Synonyms
- Batrachorhina orientalis Breuning, 1958; Batrachorhina suborientalis Breuning, 1963

Species of beetle

Batrachorhina tanganjicae is a species of beetle in the family Cerambycidae. It was described by Stephan von Breuning in 1961. It is known from Tanzania. Batrachorhina is a genus of longhorn beetles.
