= Batrachorhina pruinosa =

Scientific classification
- Kingdom: Animalia
- Phylum: Arthropoda
- Class: Insecta
- Order: Coleoptera
- Suborder: Polyphaga
- Infraorder: Cucujiformia
- Family: Cerambycidae
- Genus: Batrachorhina
- Species: B. pruinosa

Binomial name
- Batrachorhina pruinosa (Fairmaire, 1871)

Synonyms
- Madecops pruinosus Fairmaire, 1891

Species of beetle

Batrachorhina pruinosa is a species of beetle in the family Cerambycidae. It was described by Léon Fairmaire in 1871, originally under the genus Madecops. It is known from Comoros.
