= Batrachorhina orientalis =

Scientific classification
- Kingdom: Animalia
- Phylum: Arthropoda
- Class: Insecta
- Order: Coleoptera
- Suborder: Polyphaga
- Infraorder: Cucujiformia
- Family: Cerambycidae
- Genus: Batrachorhina
- Species: B. orientalis

Binomial name
- Batrachorhina orientalis Breuning, 1956

Species of beetle

Batrachorhina orientalis is a species of beetle in the family Cerambycidae. It was described by Stephan von Breuning in 1956. It is known from Uganda and Tanzania.
