= Batrachorhina distigma =

Scientific classification
- Kingdom: Animalia
- Phylum: Arthropoda
- Class: Insecta
- Order: Coleoptera
- Suborder: Polyphaga
- Infraorder: Cucujiformia
- Family: Cerambycidae
- Genus: Batrachorhina
- Species: B. distigma

Binomial name
- Batrachorhina distigma (Fairmaire, 1893)

Synonyms
- Batrachorhina punctiventris Breuning, 1938; Praonetha distigma Fairmaire, 1893

Species of beetle

Batrachorhina distigma is a species of beetle in the family Cerambycidae. It was described by Léon Fairmaire in 1893, originally under the genus Praonetha. It is known from Comoros.
