= Batrachorhina grisea =

Scientific classification
- Domain: Eukaryota
- Kingdom: Animalia
- Phylum: Arthropoda
- Class: Insecta
- Order: Coleoptera
- Suborder: Polyphaga
- Infraorder: Cucujiformia
- Family: Cerambycidae
- Tribe: Pteropliini
- Genus: Batrachorhina
- Species: B. grisea

Binomial name
- Batrachorhina grisea (Distant, 1905)

Species of beetle

Batrachorhina grisea is a species of beetle in the family Cerambycidae. It was described by William Lucas Distant in 1905. It is known from South Africa.
