= Batrachorhina rufina =

Scientific classification
- Kingdom: Animalia
- Phylum: Arthropoda
- Class: Insecta
- Order: Coleoptera
- Suborder: Polyphaga
- Infraorder: Cucujiformia
- Family: Cerambycidae
- Genus: Batrachorhina
- Species: B. rufina

Binomial name
- Batrachorhina rufina (Fairmaire, 1897)

Synonyms
- Tigranesthes rufina Fairmaire, 1897

Species of beetle

Batrachorhina rufina is a species of beetle in the family Cerambycidae. It was described by Léon Fairmaire in 1897, originally under the genus Tigranesthes. It is known from Madagascar.
