= Batrachorhina kenyana =

Scientific classification
- Kingdom: Animalia
- Phylum: Arthropoda
- Class: Insecta
- Order: Coleoptera
- Suborder: Polyphaga
- Infraorder: Cucujiformia
- Family: Cerambycidae
- Genus: Batrachorhina
- Species: B. kenyana

Binomial name
- Batrachorhina kenyana Breuning, 1958

Synonyms
- Batrachorhina kenyensis Breuning, 1960; Paracoedoma transversefasciata Breuning, 1986

Species of beetle

Batrachorhina kenyana is a species of beetle in the family Cerambycidae. It was described by Stephan von Breuning in 1958. It is known from Kenya, Zambia and Malawi.
