= Batrachorhina cruciata =

Scientific classification
- Kingdom: Animalia
- Phylum: Arthropoda
- Class: Insecta
- Order: Coleoptera
- Suborder: Polyphaga
- Infraorder: Cucujiformia
- Family: Cerambycidae
- Genus: Batrachorhina
- Species: B. cruciata

Binomial name
- Batrachorhina cruciata Breuning, 1940

Species of beetle

Batrachorhina cruciata is a species of beetle in the family Cerambycidae. It was described by Stephan von Breuning in 1940. It is known from Madagascar.
