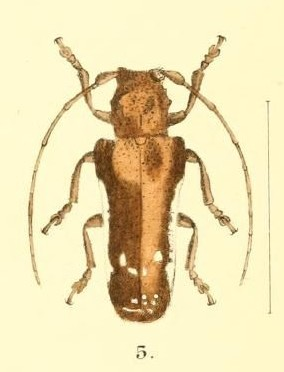
- Batrachorhina albolateralis

Scientific classification
- Domain: Eukaryota
- Kingdom: Animalia
- Phylum: Arthropoda
- Class: Insecta
- Order: Coleoptera
- Suborder: Polyphaga
- Infraorder: Cucujiformia
- Family: Cerambycidae
- Tribe: Pteropliini
- Genus: Batrachorhina

= Batrachorhina =

Genus of beetles

Batrachorhina is a genus of longhorn beetles of the subfamily Lamiinae, containing the following species:

subgenus Batrachorhina

- Batrachorhina albolateralis (Waterhouse, 1882)
- Batrachorhina albostrigosa (Fairmaire, 1893)
- Batrachorhina bipuncticollis Breuning, 1961
- Batrachorhina cristata Breuning, 1938
- Batrachorhina griseicornis Breuning, 1957
- Batrachorhina niveoscutellata Breuning, 1940
- Batrachorhina postmaculata Breuning, 1957
- Batrachorhina pruinosa (Fairmaire, 1871)
- Batrachorhina rodriguezi Breuning, 1948
- Batrachorhina semiluctuosa (Fairmaire, 1901)
- Batrachorhina similis Breuning, 1938
- Batrachorhina sogai Breuning, 1980
- Batrachorhina subgriseicornis Breuning, 1961
- Batrachorhina vulpina (Klug, 1833)

subgenus Coedomea

- Batrachorhina affinis Breuning, 1938
- Batrachorhina albopicta Breuning, 1938
- Batrachorhina albovaria Breuning, 1942
- Batrachorhina apicepicta (Fairmaire, 1901)
- Batrachorhina cruciata Breuning, 1940
- Batrachorhina descarpentriesi Breuning, 1957
- Batrachorhina distigma (Fairmaire, 1893)
- Batrachorhina flavomarmorata Breuning, 1938
- Batrachorhina flavoplagiata Breuning, 1938
- Batrachorhina fuscolateralis Breuning, 1939
- Batrachorhina griseiventris Breuning, 1942
- Batrachorhina griseofasciata Breuning, 1938
- Batrachorhina griseoplagiata Breuning, 1938
- Batrachorhina induta (Fairmaire, 1902)
- Batrachorhina kenyana Breuning, 1958
- Batrachorhina lactaria (Fairmaire, 1894)
- Batrachorhina lateritia (Fairmaire, 1894)
- Batrachorhina madagascariensis (Thomson, 1868)
- Batrachorhina medioalba Breuning, 1970
- Batrachorhina mediomaculata Breuning, 1942
- Batrachorhina nebulosa (Fairmaire, 1904)
- Batrachorhina nervulata (Fairmaire, 1894)
- Batrachorhina niviscutata (Fabricius, 1901)
- Batrachorhina orientalis Breuning, 1956
- Batrachorhina paralateritia Breuning, 1970
- Batrachorhina paraniviscutata Breuning, 1975
- Batrachorhina ratovosoni Breuning, 1970
- Batrachorhina rufina (Fairmaire, 1897)
- Batrachorhina strandi Breuning, 1938
- Batrachorhina vadoniana Breuning, 1965
- Batrachorhina vagepicta (Fairmaire, 1901)
- Batrachorhina vieui Breuning, 1965
- Batrachorhina wittei Breuning, 1954

subgenus Setocoedomea

- Batrachorhina alboplagiata Breuning, 1948
- Batrachorhina niveoplagiata Breuning, 1948
- Batrachorhina simillima Breuning, 1948

subgenus Soridus

- Batrachorhina approximata Breuning, 1940
- Batrachorhina biapicata (Chevrolat, 1857)
- Batrachorhina bipunctipennis Breuning, 1957
- Batrachorhina cephalotes Breuning, 1939
- Batrachorhina excavata Breuning, 1942
- Batrachorhina fasciculata Breuning, 1938
- Batrachorhina flavoapicalis Breuning, 1970
- Batrachorhina grisea (Distant, 1905)
- Batrachorhina jejuna Kolbe, 1894
- Batrachorhina lichenea (Fairmaire, 1902)
- Batrachorhina miredoxa Téocchi, 1986
- Batrachorhina mirei Breuning, 1969
- Batrachorhina paralichenea Breuning, 1970
- Batrachorhina principis (Aurivillius, 1910)
- Batrachorhina tanganjicae Breuning, 1961

subgenus Trichocoedomea

- Batrachorhina griseotincta (Fairmaire, 1904)
- Batrachorhina obliquevittata Breuning, 1938
- Batrachorhina paragriseotincta Breuning, 1980
- Batrachorhina tuberculicollis Breuning, 1957
- Batrachorhina vadoni Breuning, 1957
