= Batrachorhina lateritia =

Scientific classification
- Kingdom: Animalia
- Phylum: Arthropoda
- Class: Insecta
- Order: Coleoptera
- Suborder: Polyphaga
- Infraorder: Cucujiformia
- Family: Cerambycidae
- Genus: Batrachorhina
- Species: B. lateritia

Binomial name
- Batrachorhina lateritia (Fairmaire, 1894)

Synonyms
- Tigrana lateritia Fairmaire, 1894

Species of beetle

Batrachorhina lateritia is a species of beetle in the family Cerambycidae. It was described by Léon Fairmaire in 1894, originally under the genus Tigrana. It is known from Madagascar, where it has existed since the Upper Pleistocene. It feeds on Hymenaea verrucosa.
