= Batrachorhina lactaria =

Scientific classification
- Kingdom: Animalia
- Phylum: Arthropoda
- Class: Insecta
- Order: Coleoptera
- Suborder: Polyphaga
- Infraorder: Cucujiformia
- Family: Cerambycidae
- Genus: Batrachorhina
- Species: B. lactaria

Binomial name
- Batrachorhina lactaria (Fairmaire, 1894)

Synonyms
- Tigrana lactaria Fairmaire, 1894

Species of beetle

Batrachorhina lactaria is a species of beetle in the family Cerambycidae. It was described by Léon Fairmaire in 1894. It is known from Madagascar.
