= Nsimeyong =

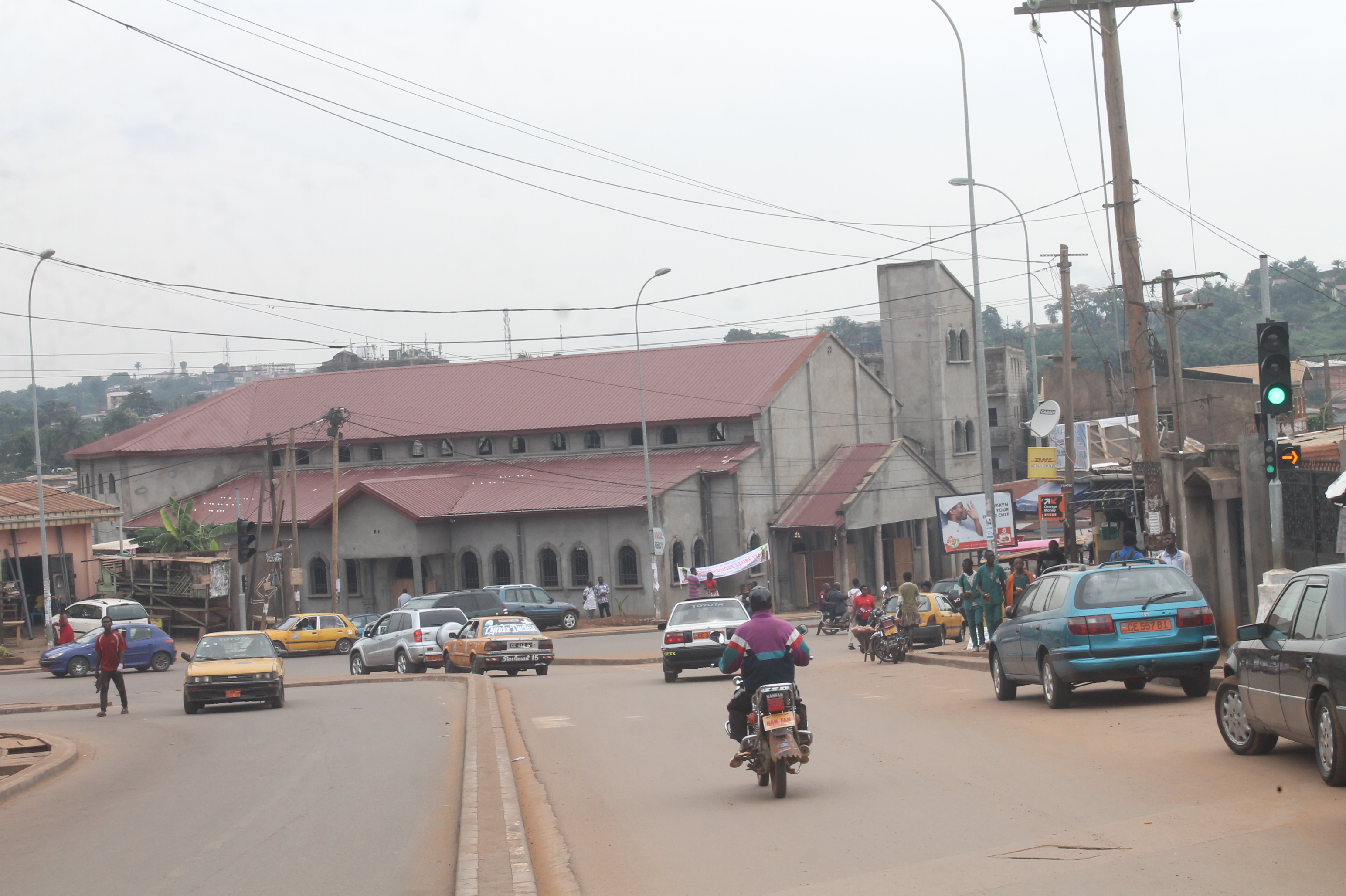
- Chappelle Nsimeyong

- Location in Cameroon
- Coordinates: 3°59′28″N 11°42′29″E
- Country: Cameroon
- Province: Centre Province
- Division: Mfoundi Division
- Elevation: 610 m (2,000 ft)

Population (2005)
  - Total: 27,714

Nsimeyong, sometimes referred to as Nyemeyong, is a former village and current neighborhood in the southern part of the city of Yaoundé in Cameroon, located in the Yaoundé 3 district. It is subdivided into three parts, namely Nsimeyong I, Nsimeyong II and Nsimeyong III. The whole area is bordered to the east by the Efoulan district, to the north by the Mvolyé district, to the south by the Mbenda village and to the west by the Biyem-assi district.

== History ==
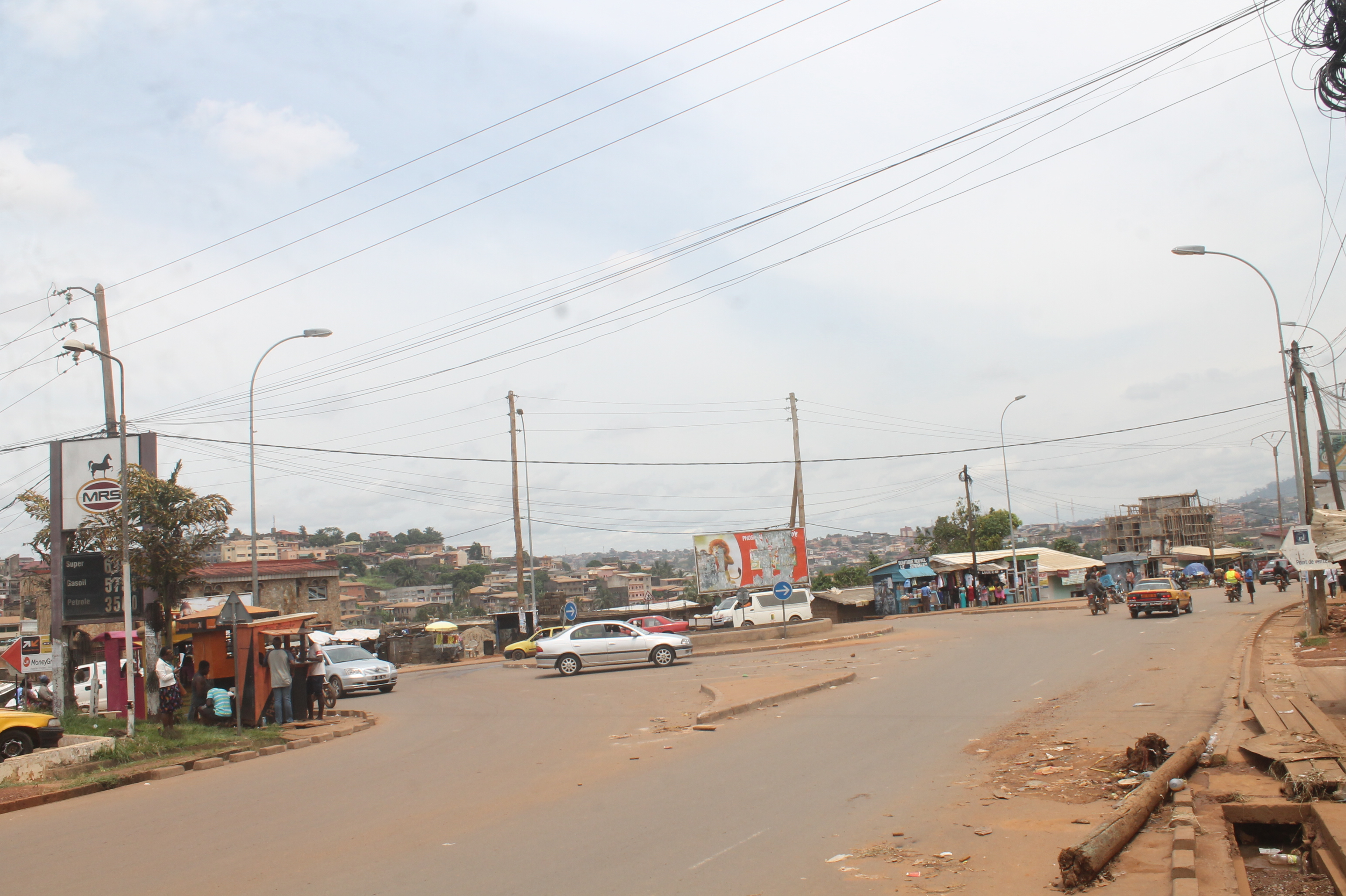
Shell Nsimeyong, a carrefour, or crossroads, which takes its name from a former petrol station

It was in 1921, that the superior chief Charles Atangana, who was already building his residential palace in the Efoulan district, and having noticed the narrowness of the latter, thought of extending his territory into its surroundings. And so in 1924, they decided with his uterine brother Essomba Ndongo to establish a new village which is Nsimeyong. The village started with just 5 buildings that were to grow over time.

== Etymology ==
Phonetically, the name "Nsimeyong" is derived from the toponym of the verb Sii which means "to frighten" and the nominal group meyon, "peoples, tribes". It is with the agreement of all the chiefs of this territory that this village will take this name with the meaning "the fear of the people". However, this name will take its literal meaning in the expression "Place where people are trained, educated, or instructed" because it would be composed of the noun nsim, derived from sim, which means "to educate, train, teach, civilize, elegant, distinguish, precious".

== Population ==
The population of Nsimeyong is largely composed of indigenous Ewondo. People from other parts of the country have settled there over the years.

== Education and religion ==
Nsimeyong is home to several primary, secondary and higher education institutions (such as the ISTAG Institute), all of which are in the private sector. Places of worship include the Chapel of Saint Charles Borromeo and the PC Nsimeyong.
