= Messamena =

Messamena Messaména
- Commune and town
- Location in Cameroon
- Coordinates: 3°44′N 12°50′E
- Country: Cameroon
- Region: East
- Department: Haut-Nyong
- Commune: Messamena
- Constituted: 7 June 1955

Area
  - Total: 5,000 km^{2} (1,900 sq mi)
- Elevation: 650 m (2,130 ft)

Population (2012)
  - Total: 32,282
  - Density: 6/km^{2} (16/sq mi)
- Time zone: UTC+1 (WAT)
- Climate: Aw
- Website: https://www.cvuc.cm/national/index.php/fr/carte-communale/region-de-lest/121-association/carte-administrative/est/haut-nyong/479-messamena

Messamena (also spelled Messaména) is a town and commune in Cameroon.

== Location ==
The town of Messamena is the capital of the arrondissement (commune) of the same name. They are located in the Haut-Nyong Department, East Region.

The commune is bounded to the north by the commune of Atok (Maka-bebend), to the south by Somalomo, to the east by Mindourou, to the west by Akonolinga, and to the northeast by Abong-Mbang.

The commune is around 5,000 km^{2} (1,900 sq mi).

== History ==
Under German colonialism, Messamena was the principal town of its subdivision, and this arrangement was sustained under French rule. Messamena received the first administrative infrastructure on the eve of the Second World War, in 1937, with a prison, district hospital (1937), and junior school (1940). It was formally constituted as a commune by decree on 7 June 1955, and the construction of a town hall, Protestant and Catholic churches (1957) and a post office (1958) followed.

In 1966–67, Messamena town had a population of 540 and the commune as a whole a population of 17,079. Its area was 4,965 km^{2} (1,917 sq mi), with a population density of 3.43 per km^{2} (of which 3,275 km^{2} (1,264 sq mi) was considered to be an inhabited zone, with a population density of 4.58).

== Population ==
According to the local-government Diagnostic de l'Espace Urbain Communale and Diagnostic Participatif au Niveau des Villages, as of around 2012, the Municipality of Messamena had a total of 32,282 inhabitants, including 10,790 men, 10,364 women and 11,128 young people, with an average density of 6 people per km^{2}.

2,159 inhabit urban areas and 30,123 inhabitants rural ones. The municipality has 86 villages, including ten camps of the Baka people and four quartiers.

The population is ethnically diverse, including people from the Bikélé, Badjoué, Kaka, Pygmies, as well as more recent arrivals, some from West Africa, including members of the Bamiléké, Eton, Hausa, Ewondo, and Bulu.

== Environment ==
The landscape of the district is characterised by low hills, draining huge amounts of runoff in the rainy season, which results in the formation of streams in the valleys.

=== Climate type ===
The climate is of Köppen climate classification type Aw, tropical wet and dry, with average temperatures of up to 30 °C (86 °F). It is characterized by a short rainy season from March to June, a short dry season from July to August, a long rainy season from August to mid-November, and a long dry season from mid-November to mid-March.

=== Hydrology ===
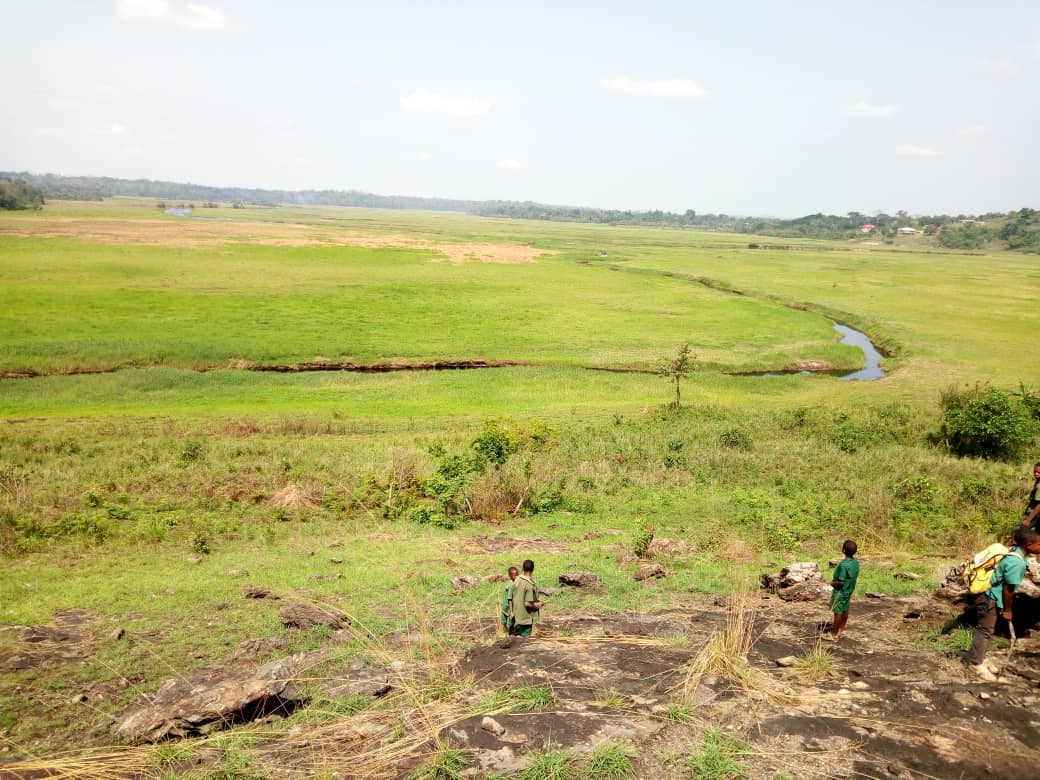
Long Mafok, one of the tributaries of the Nyong River, coming from the town of Messamena.

The district is characterised by a dense river-system dotted with numerous lakes and swamps, of which the main river is the Nyong. Other major rivers include the Long Mafok, Lehé, and Mpomo.

=== Forest ===
The district stands in a zone of dense, evergreen, ecologically diverse equatorial forest, most often characterised (depending on local soil types) by Annona senegalensis and Bridelia ferruginea, interspersed with pockets of shrubby savannah. Fallow land is characterised by the invasive Chromolaena odorata and secondary forest.

The flora of the district is rich in species, many with economic potential—not only timber, but also other forest products such as medicinal species. Local people harvest non-wood forest products such as djansang (Ricinodendron heudelotii), wild mangoes (Irvingia gabonensis), bita kola (Garcinia kola), and cola des sanges (Coula edulis).

However, the forest is constantly facing deforestation by people due to housing, population growth, the expansion of agricultural activities, and logging (legal and illegal). It is home to animals such as rats, bats, deer, boas, hares, vipers, hedgehogs, antelopes, porcupines, monitor lizards, moles, wild boar, sloths, turtles, serpent noir, monkeys, chimpanzees, gorillas, and fowl. Many of these animals are already endangered. No part of the commune falls within a national park, but there are unités forestières d’aménagement (forest management units), a communal forest, and some community forests (such as Bibom and Nkonzuh).

=== Soil types and minerals ===
Soil types are shaped by the dense, humid forest. As a result, heat and humidity alternate and lead to the decomposition of humus to great depths. As a result, soils tend to be iron-rich, thick, acidic, and red or yellow in colour. In some places, soil comes in clay-sandy form. The permeability of these soils makes them fertile, suited to the production of food and cash crops, and variation in soil-types is accordingly of considerable economic importance.

Sand and gravel are the main mineral resources of the commune, used for the construction of infrastructure and housing.

== Social infrastructure ==
=== Governance ===
The commune has a council whose members are ethnically diverse. It is headed by a mayor, who presides over four commissions: General Affairs, Economy and Finance, Health, Social and Cultural Action, and Forestry. A 2012 report identified the following concerns in Messamena: abusive exploitation of the forest, poaching, limited harnessing of natural resources, under-exploitation of tourist sites, insufficient communication channels, and the domination of economic activity by the informal sector.

=== Health and education ===
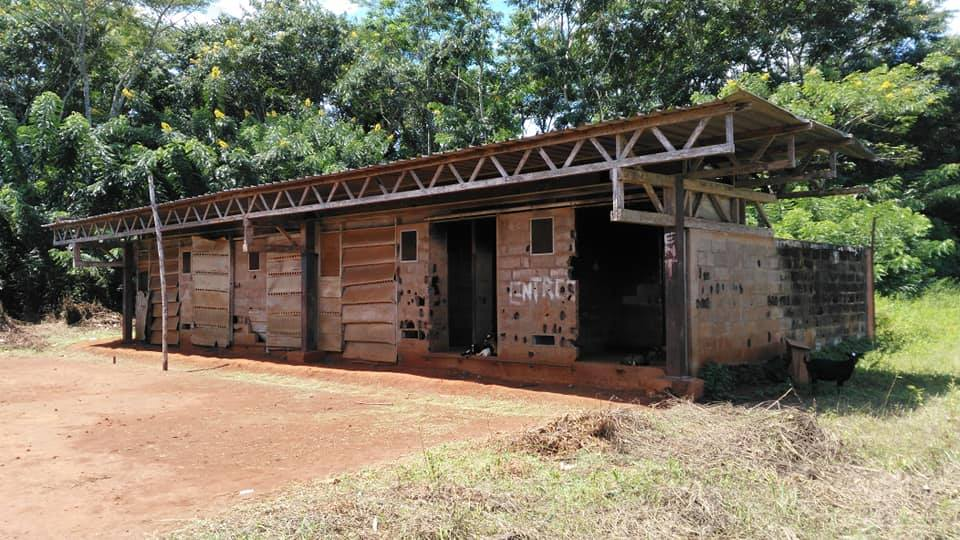
Primary school in Ngoulmakong, a village in the commune of Messamena.

The municipality has numerous schools and clinics.

=== Sports ===
The town of Messamena has a football ground, hosts local championships; various villages have green spaces set up as sport areas.

== Economy ==
Economic activity in Messamena is focused on agriculture: 80-90% of the population rely on it directly. Unemployment is very high and, as in most of Cameroon, most economic activity is informal. The informal sector includes small trades such as street vendors of raw or prepared food, shoemakers, and mechanics.

=== Markets ===
Market activity is focused on the town of Messamena, which has a municipal market in the town centre. The town's population focuses on buying and selling food products and cash crops (cocoa, coffee) supplied by the villages. Large quantities are sold on to Bertoua and Yaounde.

Sale of manufactured goods is dominated by West African immigrants and Cameroonian nationals with shops in the town centre and the commune's villages. Manufactured products are supplied from Yaoundé, Abong-Mbang and Bertoua.

=== Farming ===
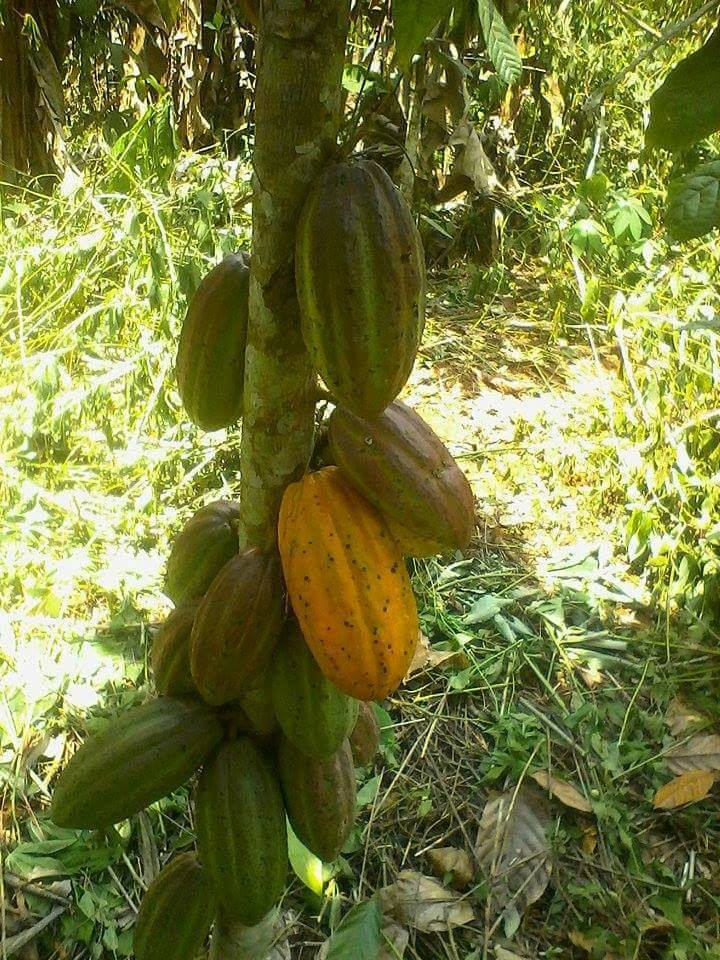
Cocoa tree in Ngoulmakong, in the commune of Messamena.

The dominant agricultural practise is shifting slash-and-burn agriculture in fallows two to three years old. Despite the abundance of land, farming techniques remain traditional and subsistence-level, focused on peanuts, maize, cassava, plantain, and macabo, making productivity and income levels very low. Alongside this, there is cash-cropping of cocoa, coffee, and palm oil. A poor road network limits the sale and marketing of these crops to improve the income of producers.

Fruit production involves papaya, lemon, oranges, safouts, mangoes (and foraging for wild mangoes), various colas, djansang, and production of palm wine.

Animal-breeding is not widely practiced; anima rearing remains traditional and mostly subsistence-level. The species raised are hens, pigs, goats, and sheep, which generally roam freely.

=== Hunting and fishing ===
Notwithstanding legal restrictions and the presence of checkpoints for flora and fauna, hunting game for sale by means of traps, firearms, spears and dogs is common, with targets including deer, pangolins, monkeys, wild boar, and hares, some of which are endangered.

Most of the rivers are full of fish and the local population practice traditional, subsistence-level fishing for species such as catfish, tilapia, carps, crabs, Nile perch and tachetés. For commercial fishing, the Nyong River is the main site, and the population along the river derives diverse sources of income from it. Fishing takes place year-round and techniques used include nets, dams, traps, and line-fishing.

=== Logging and production ===
Manufacture focuses on craft production in carpentry, sewing, basketry, and manufacturing rattan and raffia bamboo furniture. The demand for handicrafts is high but production is low due to the small number of craftsmen.

Itinerant logging, licensed and unlicensed, is carried out.

There is processing of cassava and maize into flour.

== Infrastructure ==
=== Energy ===
The town of Messamena was not, as of 2012, supplied by the AES / SONEL high-voltage electrical network, but the town did have two generators. Rural electrification had not yet begun. The majority of communities in Messamena still use petroleum-based storm lamps for illumination; some rely on firewood.

=== Water supply ===
As of 2012, 10% of the population of the commune formally had access to potable water, others relying on riverwater or other resources. The municipality did not have a local CDE distribution network and as of about 2012, the SCANWATER network was not operational. The commune had 74 state-supported wells and boreholes, some of which were fitted with human-powered pumps.

=== Transport ===
The town of Messamena has a road network consisting of 40 km (25 mi) of unmetalled roads, connecting to the national Yaoundé-Bertoua road, route 10. As of 2012, the commune overall had 878 km (546 mi) of official roads, with further road- and bridge-building underway.

=== Telecommunications ===
Telephone landlines have not been installed in the commune, but radio and television is available, along with extensive mobile phone coverage via MTN and Orange.

== See also ==
- Communes of Cameroon
