= Kol language (Cameroon) =

Bantu language spoken in Cameroon

Kol
- Native to: Cameroon
- Native speakers: (12,000 cited 1988)
- Language family: Niger–Congo?: Atlantic–Congo; Benue–Congo; Bantu (Zone A); Makaa–Njem + Kako (A.80–90); Ndzem–Bomwali; Makaa; Kol

Language codes
- ISO 639-3: biw
- Glottolog: kolc1235
- Guthrie code: A.832

Kol is a Niger–Congo language of the Bantu family, associated with the Bikélé ethnic group. It is spoken in the East Province of Cameroon, in the vicinity of Messaména. Alternate names for Kol language include Bikele-Bikay, Bikele-Bikeng, Bikélé, and Bekol.

== Demographics ==
Kol, also known as Bekol or Bikele, is located in the northern part of Messamena, Haut-Nyong Department (Eastern Region), south of Meka. It is closely related to Meka and has 12,000 speakers (Ethnologue 2000).
