= Mondah Forest =

Coastal forest in northwest Gabon

Mondah Forest is a legally protected coastal forest in Komo-Mondah Department, northwest Gabon.

The forest is partially flooded and includes various ecosystems such as mangrove and mahogany. The forest's proximity to Libreville has placed the forest under environmental pressure, and some areas have been cleared for food crops.
