= Bikélé people =

Ethnic group of Cameroon

The Bikélé are an ethnic group living mainly in the south-west of Cameroon, in the department of Haut-Nyong, sub-division of Messamena. They are closely related to the Badjoué.

== Language ==
The Bikélé speak the kol language (also known as Bikélé), a southern Bantoid language.

== Bibliography ==
- Dictionnaire des villages du Haut-Nyong, Centre ORSTOM de Yaoundé, June 1968, 84 p. (identification of Bikélé villages)
- H. Koch, "Le petit bétail chez les Badjoué et Bikélé de Messamena", in Bulletin de la Société d'études camerounaises, 1946, 276, Numbers: 13-14, p. 27-108
- Henri Koch, Magie et chasse au Cameroun (Paris: Berger-Levrault, 1968) [a study of the culture of Badjoué and Bikélé peoples].

== See also ==
- Ethnic groups in Cameroon
