= Komo-Mondah (department) =

Coordinates: 0°22′N 9°47′E

- Department
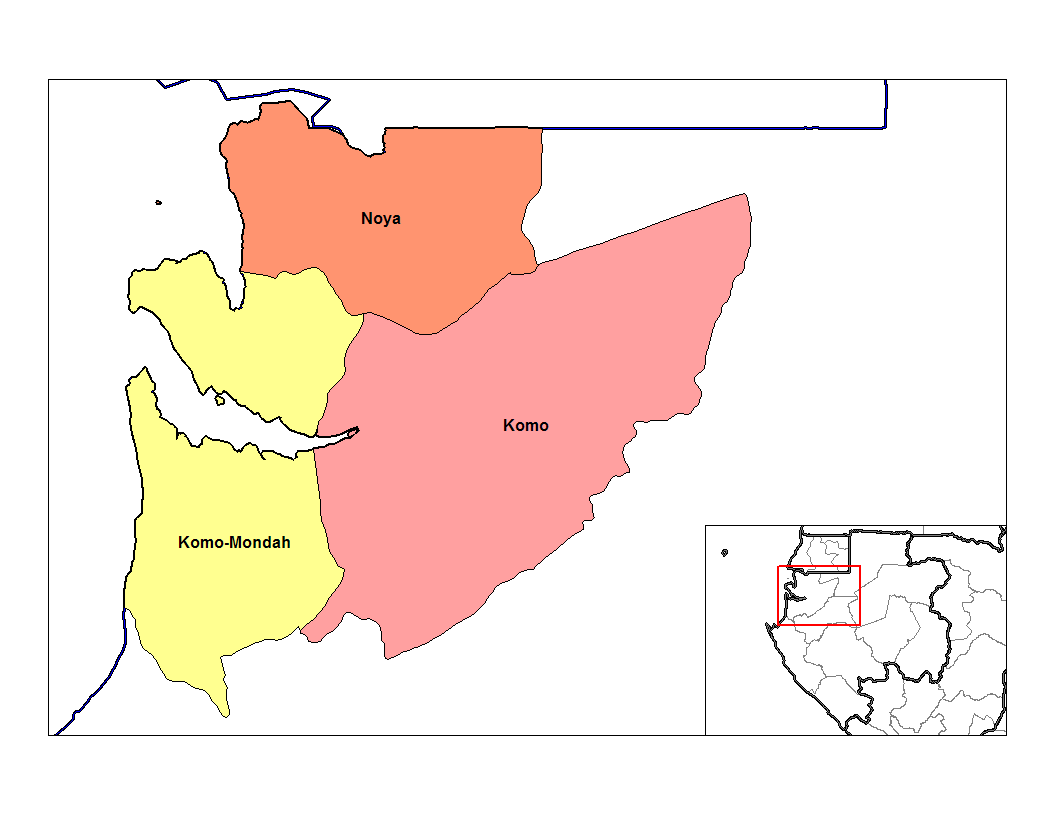
- Komo-Mondah Department in the region
- Country: Gabon
- Province: Estuaire Province

Population (2013 Census)
  - Total: 90,096
- Time zone: UTC+1 (GMT +1)

Komo-Mondah is a department in the Estuaire Province in western Gabon. The capital is located in Ntoum with a population of 90,096 as of 2013.

== Towns and villages ==
- Ntoum

== Famous people ==
Well-known people from the Department include Paul Biyoghé Mba.

== Ecology ==
The Department contains the protected Mondah Forest.
