= Communes of Cameroon =

Third-level units of administration in Cameroon

The divisions of Cameroon are the third-level units of administration in Cameroon. They are organised by divisions and sub divisions of each province (now regions).

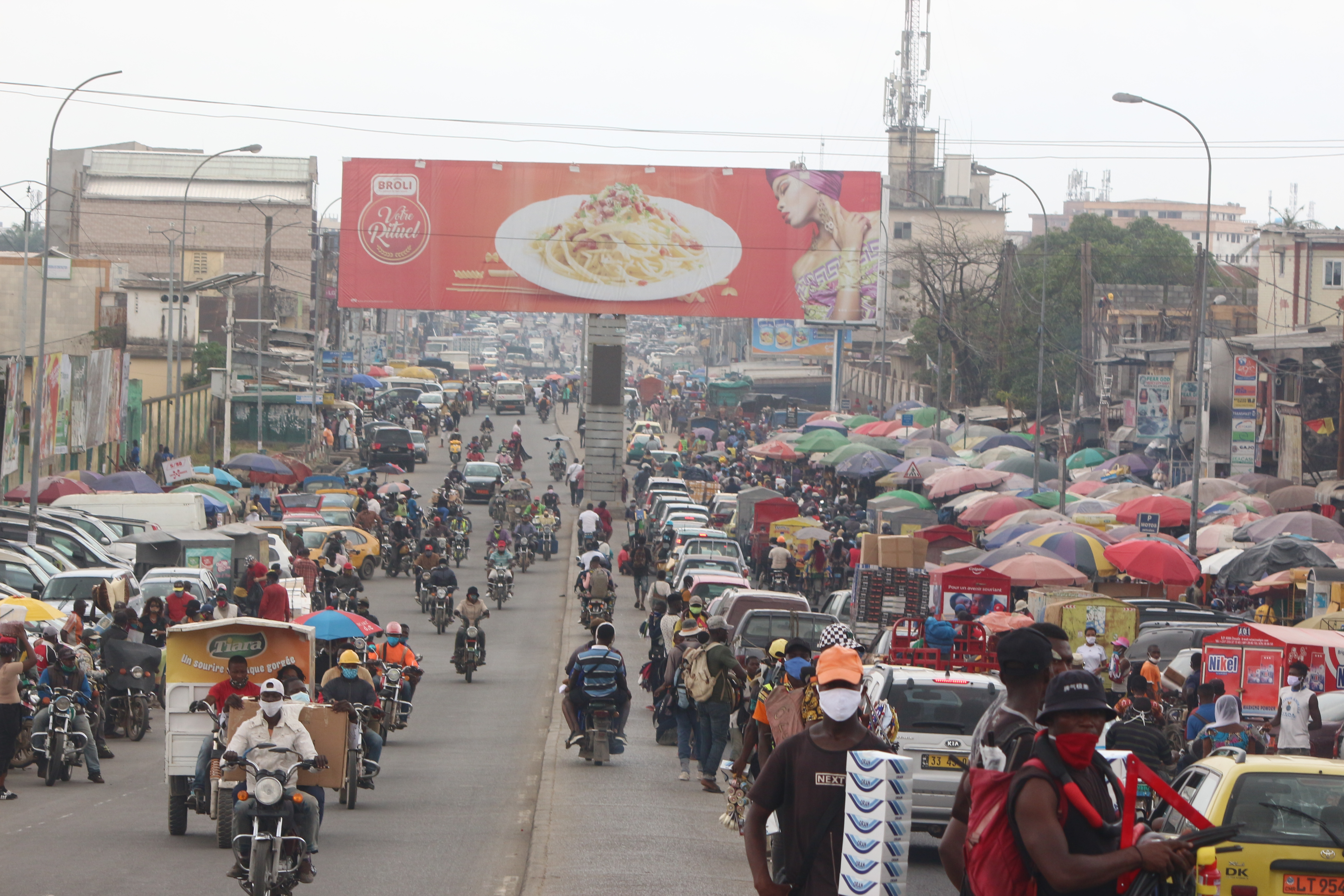
Douala City

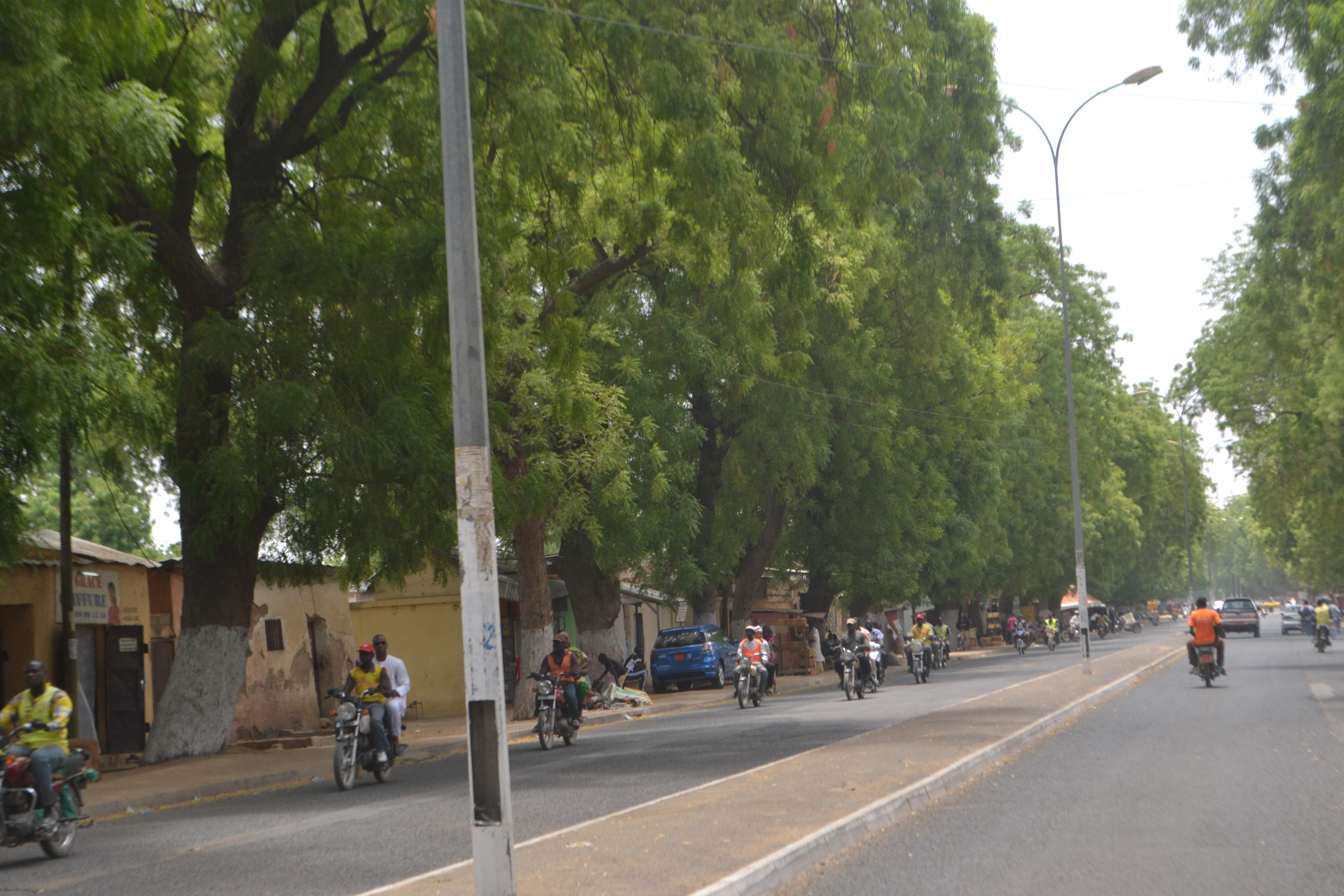
A street in Maroua

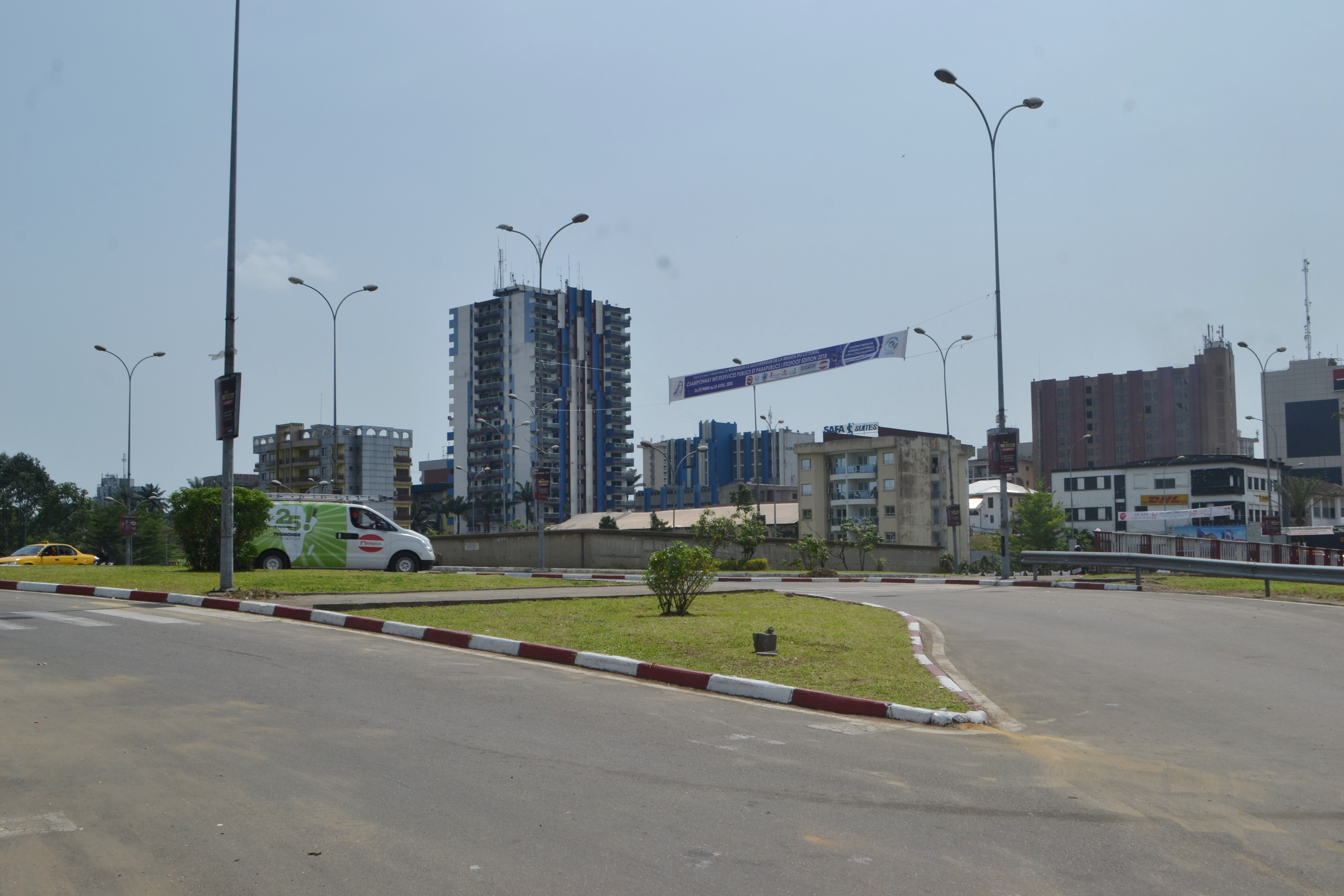
Bonanjo, Douala

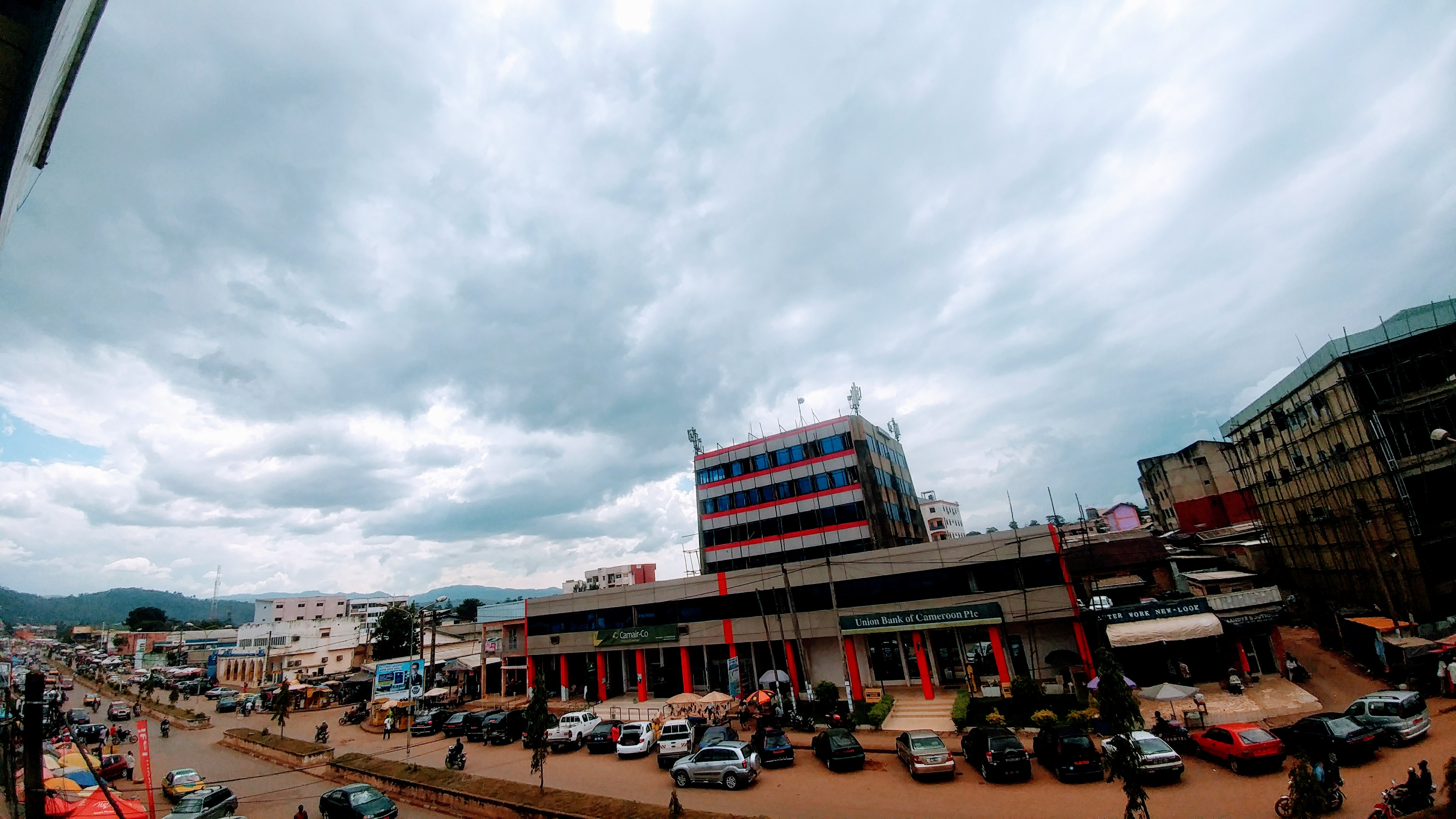
Bamenda town

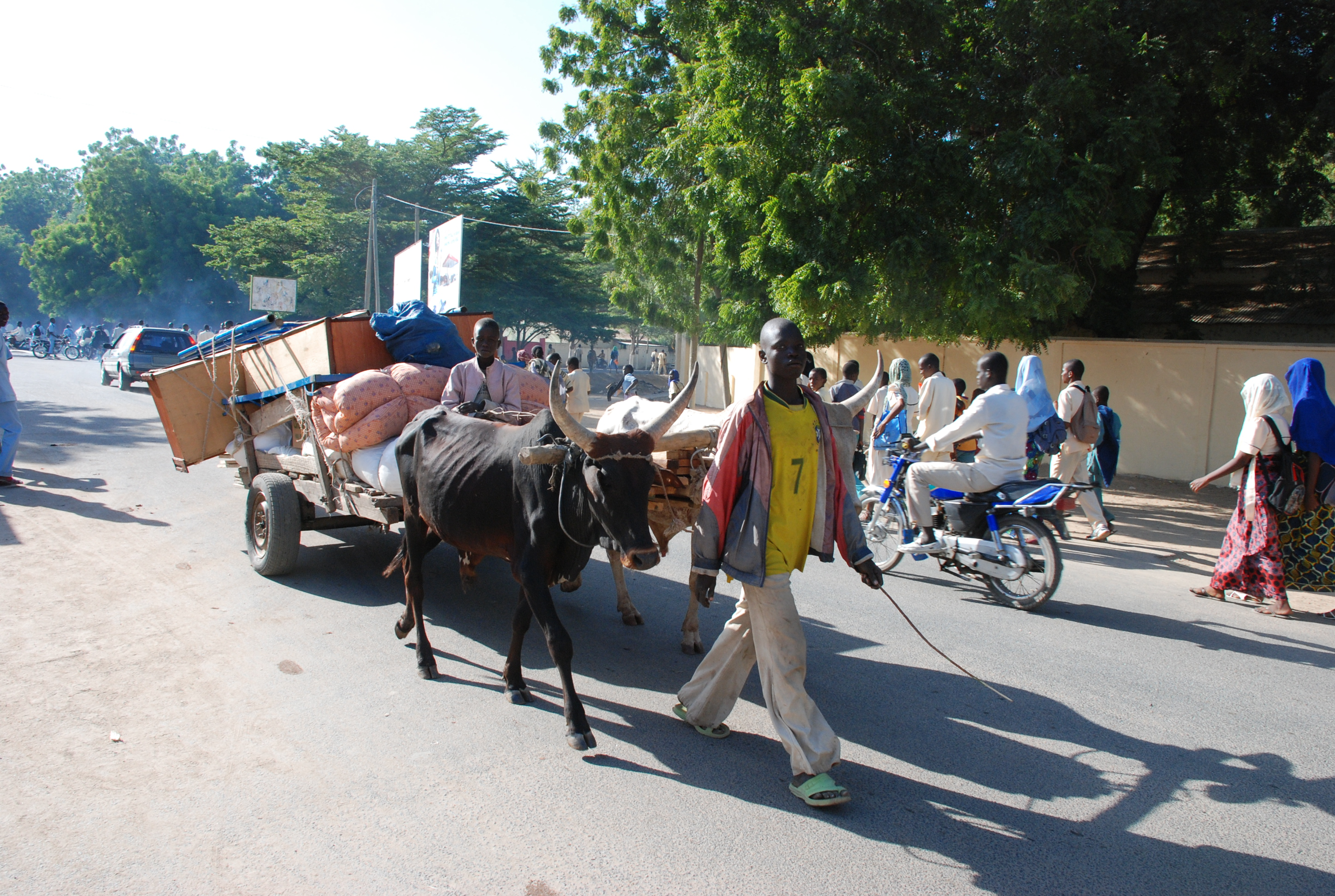
Garoua

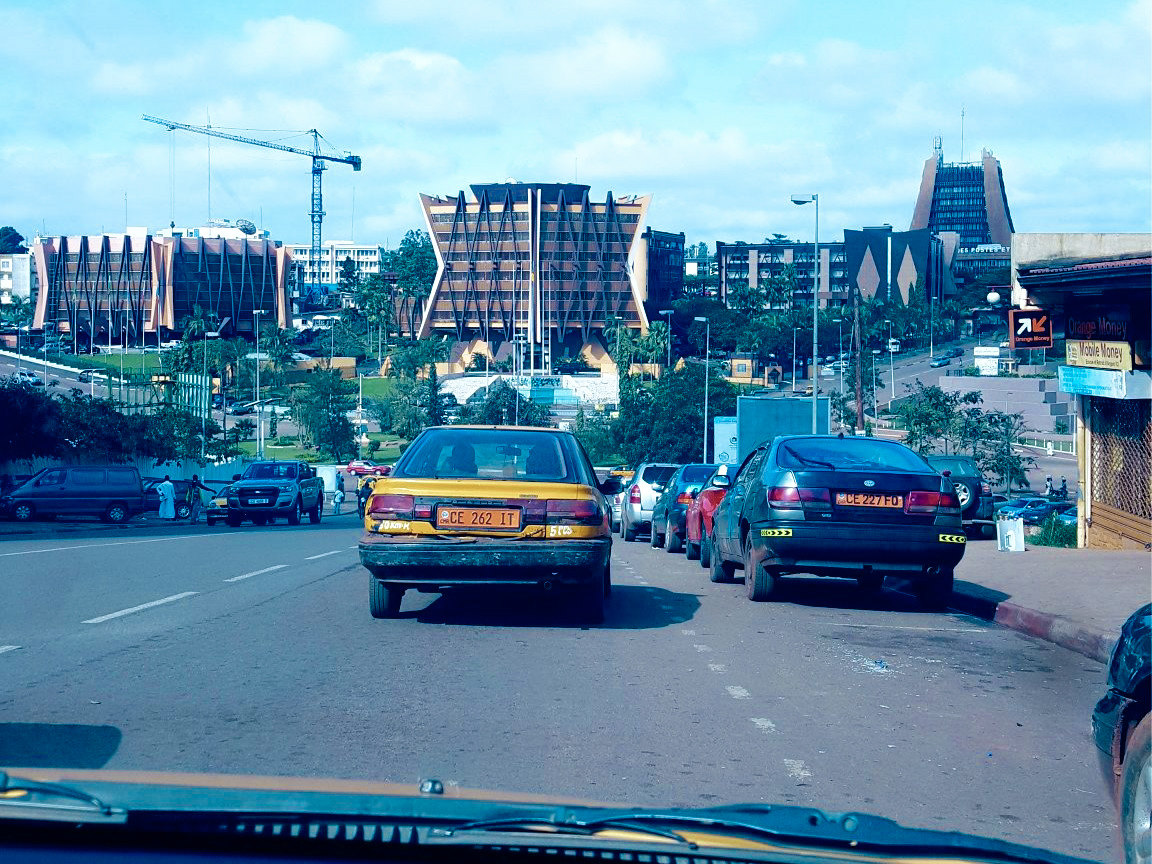
Yaounde

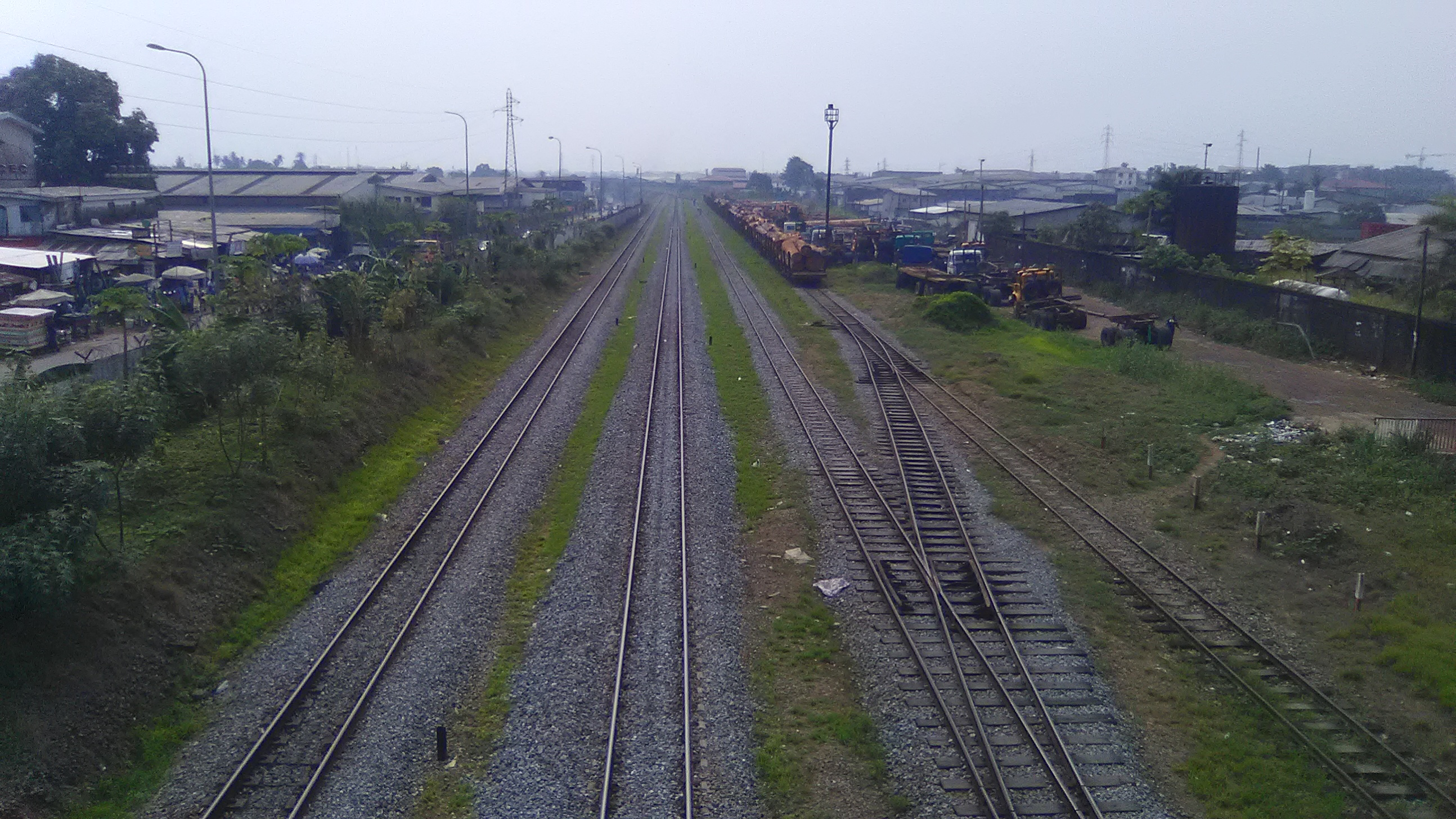
Railway in Douala

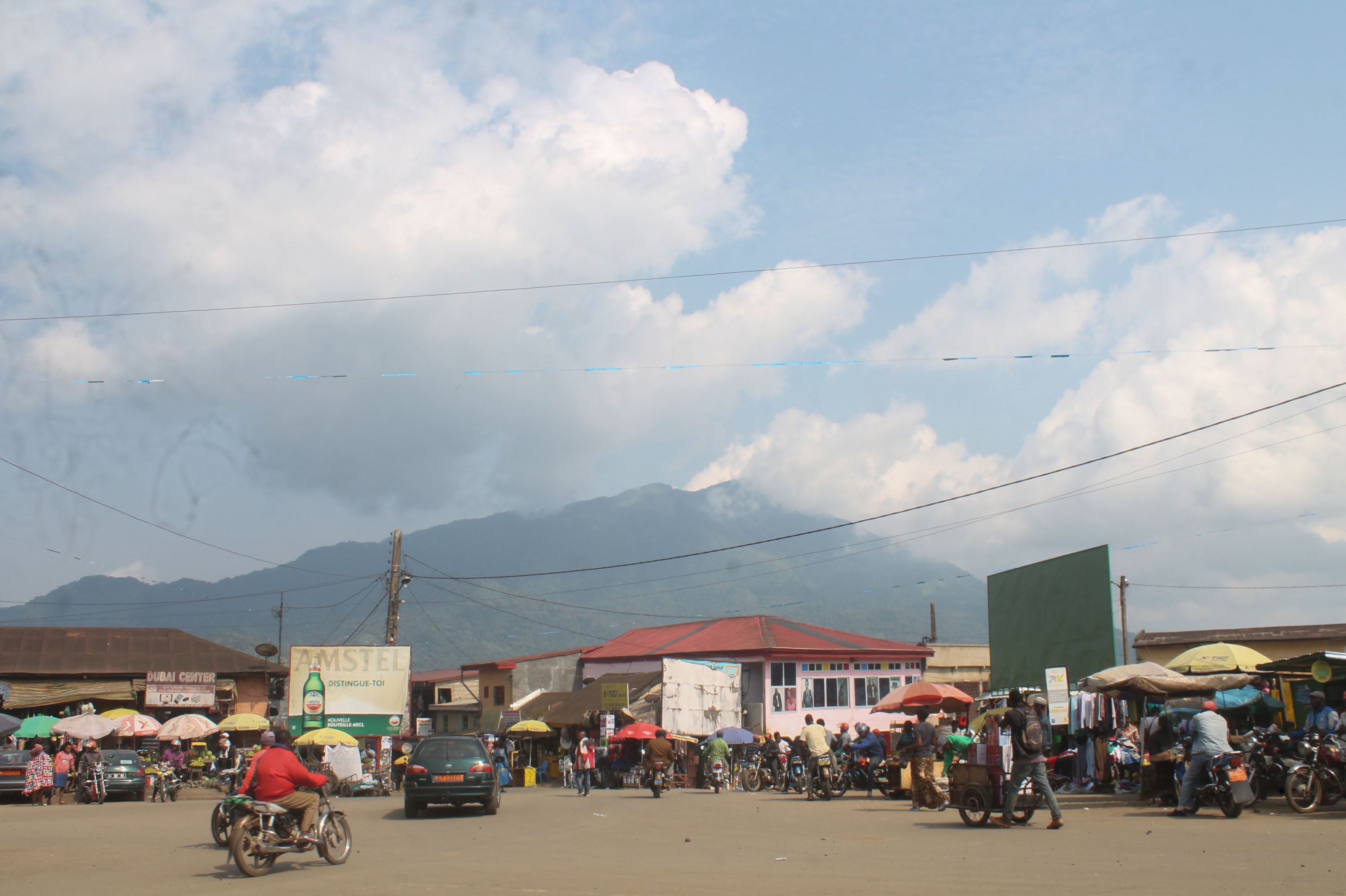
Nkongsamba

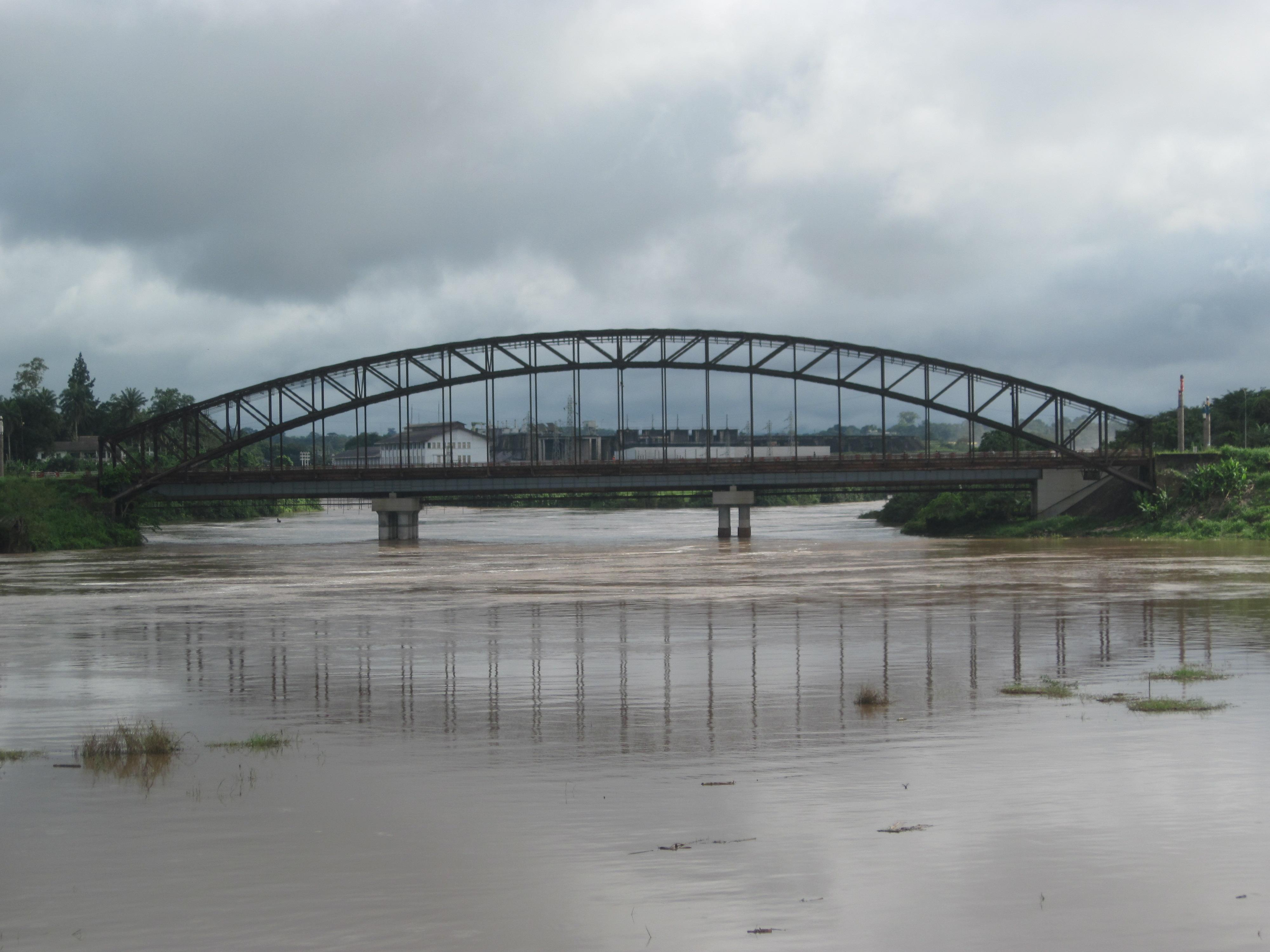
A German Bridge over the Edea River

As of 2005 (and since 1996) there are two urban communities (Douala and Yaoundé) divided into 11 urban districts (5 in Douala and 6 in Yaounde), nine towns with special status (Nkongsamba, Bafoussam, Bamenda, Limbe, Edéa, Ebolowa, Garoua, Maroua and Kumba), 11 urban communes and 305 rural communes.

The councils are headed by mayors and municipal councillors who are elected. The councils have a responsibility in principle for the management of local affairs under the supervision of the state.

Under Cameroonian law, the councils provide and regulate administrative, economic and social development, define and enforce work practices to increase efficiency and improve the quality of services, promote training and retraining of municipal staff.

The ballot for the election of municipal elections is a mixed system with both a majority system and a proportional representation system. The party which obtains the absolute majority of votes wins all the seats.

If no party receives an absolute majority, the party that obtains the plurality gets half the seats, with the other half allocated in proportion to the votes of each party.

The law requires the parties to take account of the various sociological components of the district, including the representation of ethnic minorities.

Urban municipalities and special urban communities are headed by representatives appointed by decree of president of the Republic of Cameroon, who serve as mayor and the metropolitan chairman.

In urban communities there are urban district headed by elected municipal councils, but whose functions are much reduced than in other iii

== List of municipalities ==
=== A-Z ===
==== A ====
Municipality	Département	Province
Abong-Mbang	Haut-Nyong	Est
Afanloum	Méfou-et-Afamba	Centre
Ako	Donga Mantung	Nord-Ouest
Akoeman	Nyong-et-So'o	Centre
Akom II	Océan	Sud
Akono	Méfou-et-Akono	Centre
Akonolinga	Nyong-et-Mfoumou	Centre
Akwaya	Manyu	Sud-Ouest
Alou	Lebialem	Sud-Ouest
Ambam	Vallée du Ntem	Sud
Andek	Momo	Nord-Ouest
Angossas	Haut-Nyong	Est
Atok	Haut-Nyong	Est
Awaé	Méfou-et-Afamba	Centre
Ayos	Nyong-et-Mfoumou	Centre

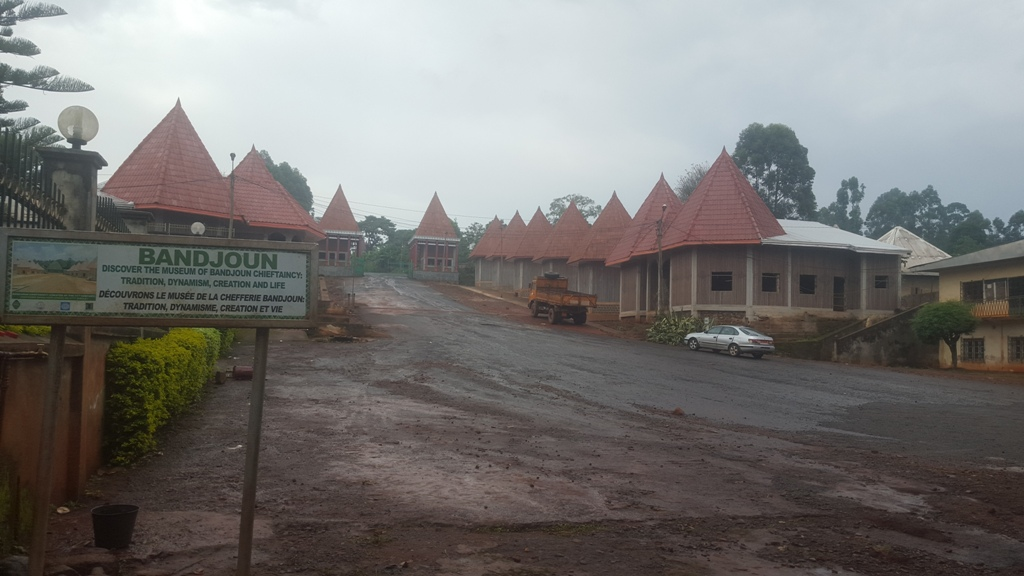
Bandjoun Palace

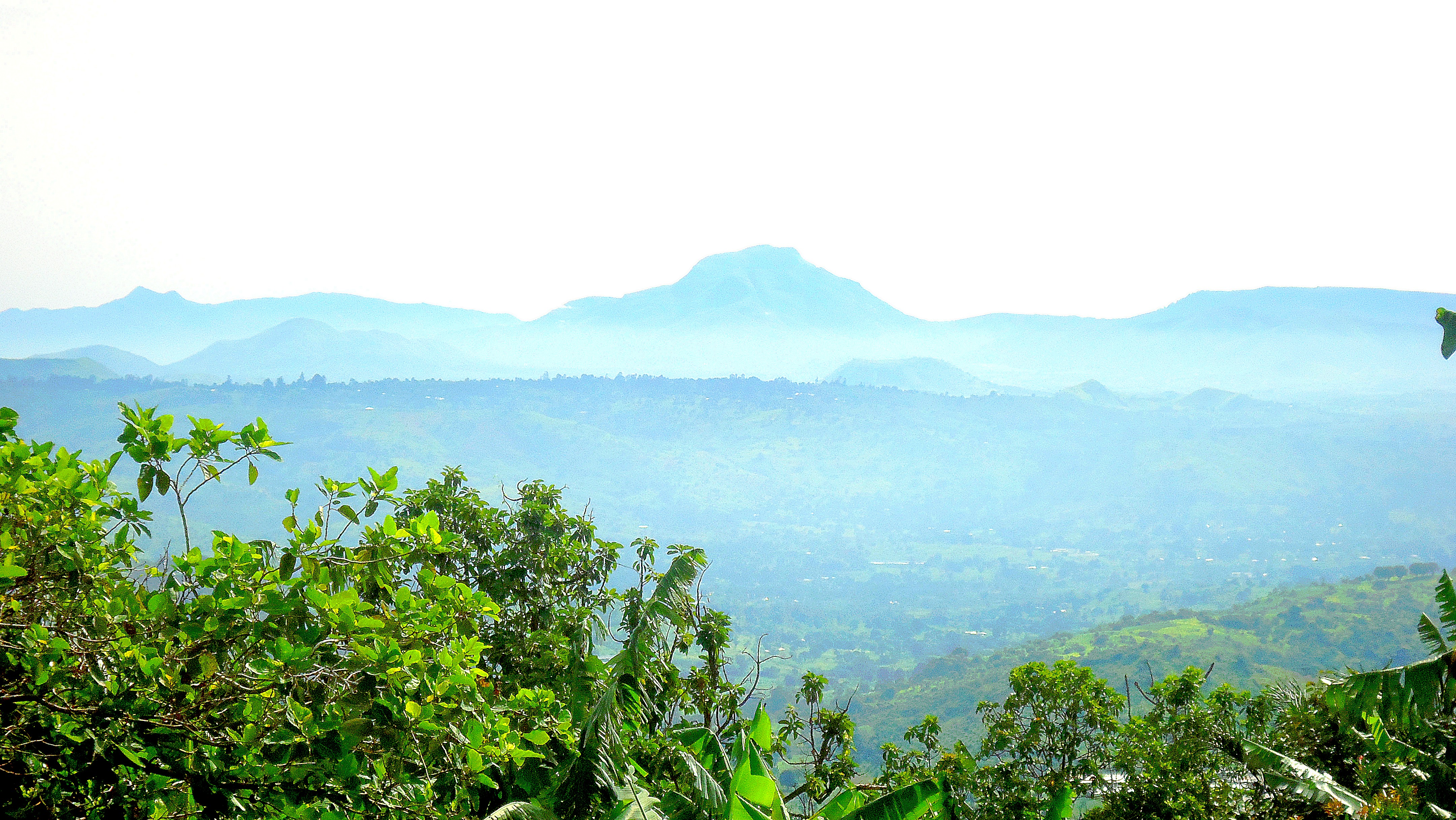
Bandjoun Landscape

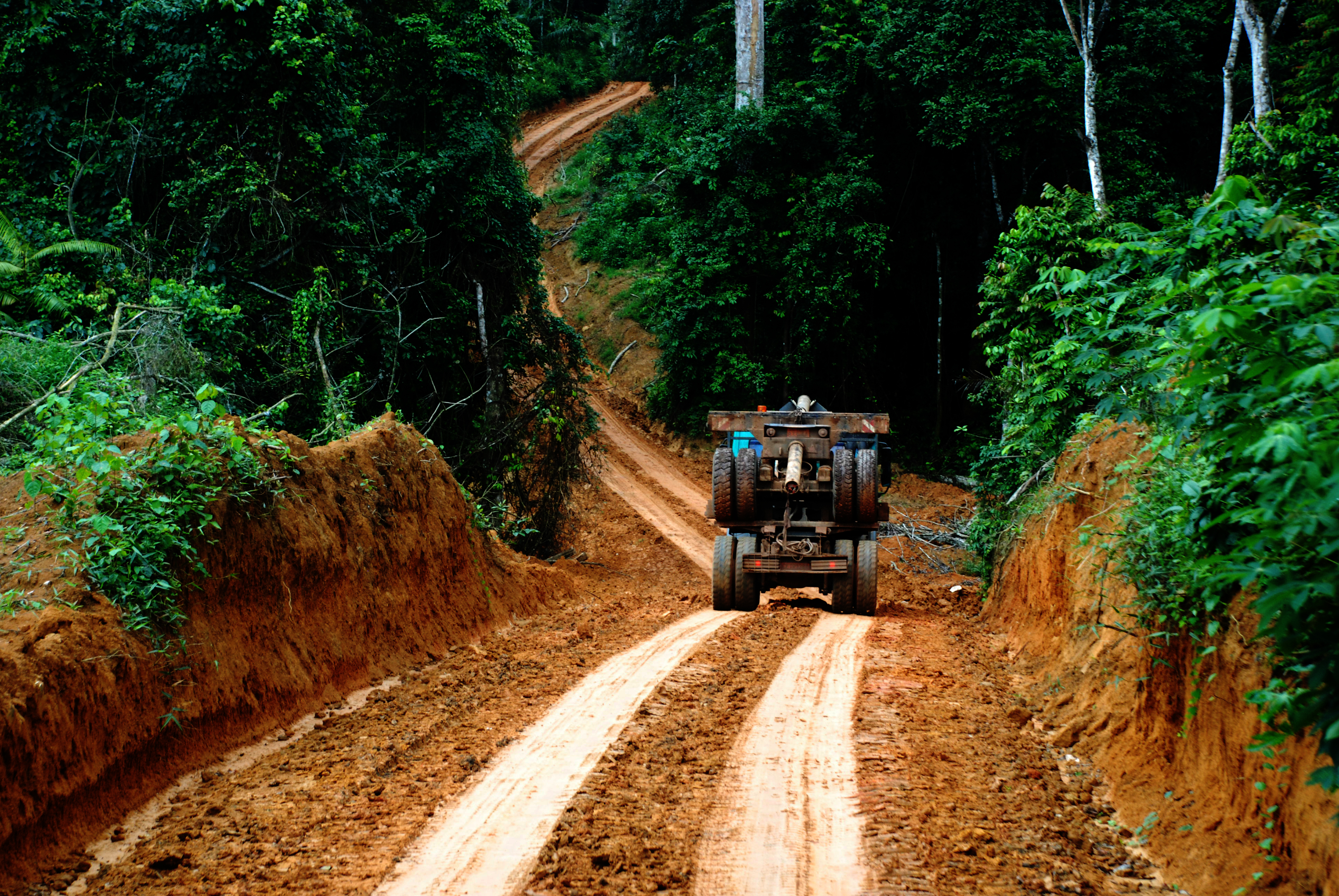
Makak Road

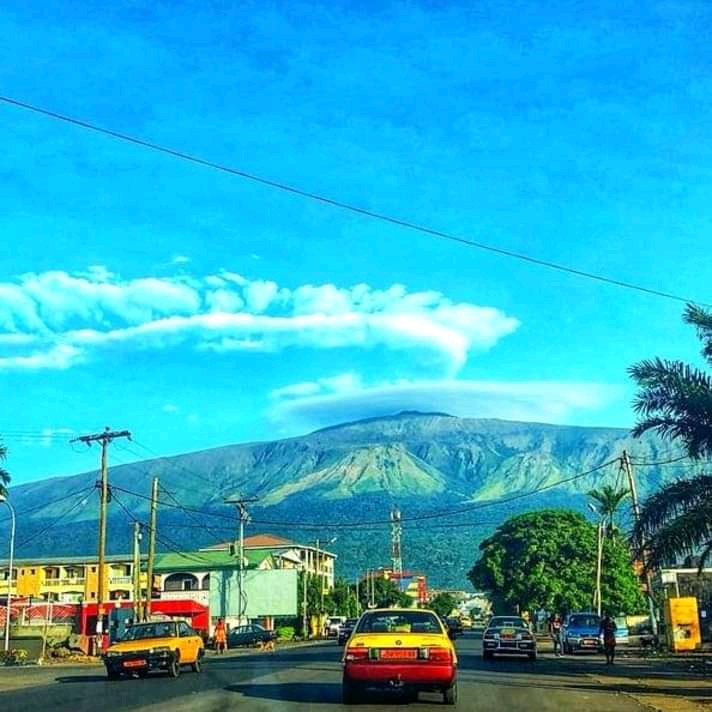
Buea City with a view of Mt Fako

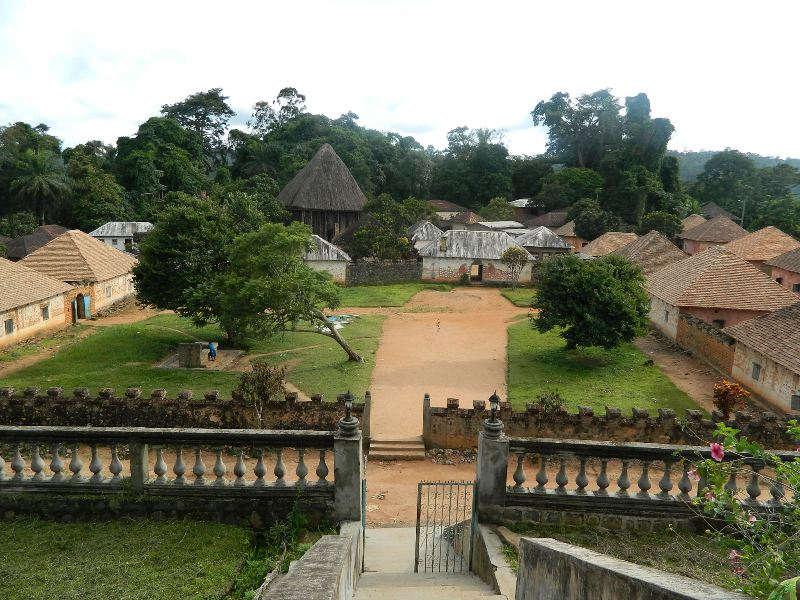
Bafut Palace

==== B ====
Commune	Département	Province
Babadjou	Bamboutos	Ouest
Babessi	Ngo-Ketunjia	Nord-Ouest
Babouantou	Haut-Nkam	Ouest
Bafang	Haut-Nkam	Ouest
Bafia	Mbam-et-Inoubou	Centre
Bafou	Haut-Nkam	Ouest
Bafoussam	Mifi	Ouest
Bafut	Mezam	Nord-Ouest
Baham	Hauts-Plateaux	Ouest
Bali	Mezam	Nord-Ouest
Balikumbat	Ngo-Ketunjia	Nord-Ouest
Bamenda	Mezam	Nord-Ouest
Bamendjou	Hauts-Plateaux	Ouest
Bamuso	Ndian	Sud-Ouest
Bana	Haut-Nkam	Ouest
Bandja	Haut-Nkam	Ouest
Bandjoun	Koung-Khi	Ouest
Bangangté	Ndé	Ouest
Bangem	Koupé et Manengouba	Sud-Ouest
Banka	Haut-Nkam	Ouest
Bangou	Hauts-Plateaux	Ouest
Bangourain	Noun	Ouest
Bankim	Mayo-Banyo	Adamaoua
Banyo	Mayo-Banyo	Adamaoua
Baré	Mungo	Littoral
Barndaké	Bénoué	Nord
Bashéo	Bénoué	Nord
Bassamba	Ndé	Ouest
Batcham	Bamboutos	Ouest
Batchenga	Lékié	Centre
Batibo	Momo	Nord-Ouest
Batié	Hauts-Plateaux	Ouest
Batoufam	Koung-Khi	Ouest
Batouri	Kadey	Est
Bayangam	Koung-Khi	Ouest
Bazou	Ndé	Ouest
Beka	Faro	Nord
Bélabo	Lom-et-Djérem	Est
Belel	Vina	Adamaoua
Belo	Boyo	Nord-Ouest
Benakuma	Menchum	Nord-Ouest
Bengbis	Dja et Lobo	Sud
Bertoua	Lom-et-Djérem	Est
Bétaré-Oya	Lom-et-Djérem	Est
Bibemi	Bénoué	Nord
Bibey	Haute- Sanaga	Centre
Bikok	Méfou-et-Akono	Centre
Bipindi	Océan	Sud
Biwong-Bane	Mvila	Sud
Biwong-Bulu	Mvila	Sud
Biyouha	Nyong-et-Kéllé	Centre
Blangoua	Logone-et-Chari	Extrême-Nord
Bogo	Diamaré	Extrême-Nord
Bokito	Mbam-et-Inoubou	Centre
Bonaléa	Mungo	Littoral
Bondjock	Nyong-et-Kéllé	Centre
Bot-Makak	Nyong-et-Kéllé	Centre
Bourrha	Mayo-Tsanaga	Extrême-Nord
Buéa	Fako	Sud-Ouest

==== C ====
Commune	Département	Province
Campo	Océan	Sud

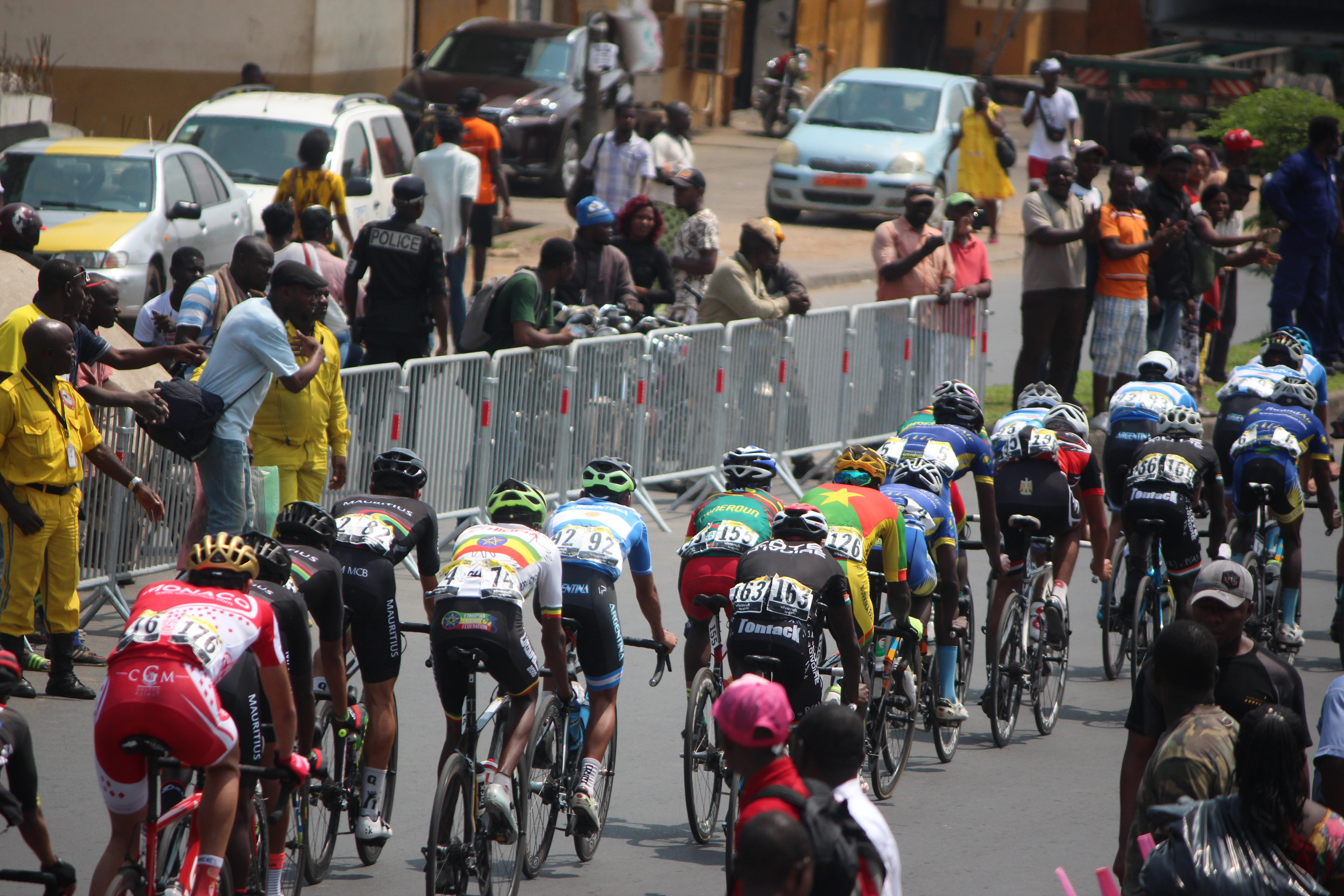
Cycling tour in the city of Douala

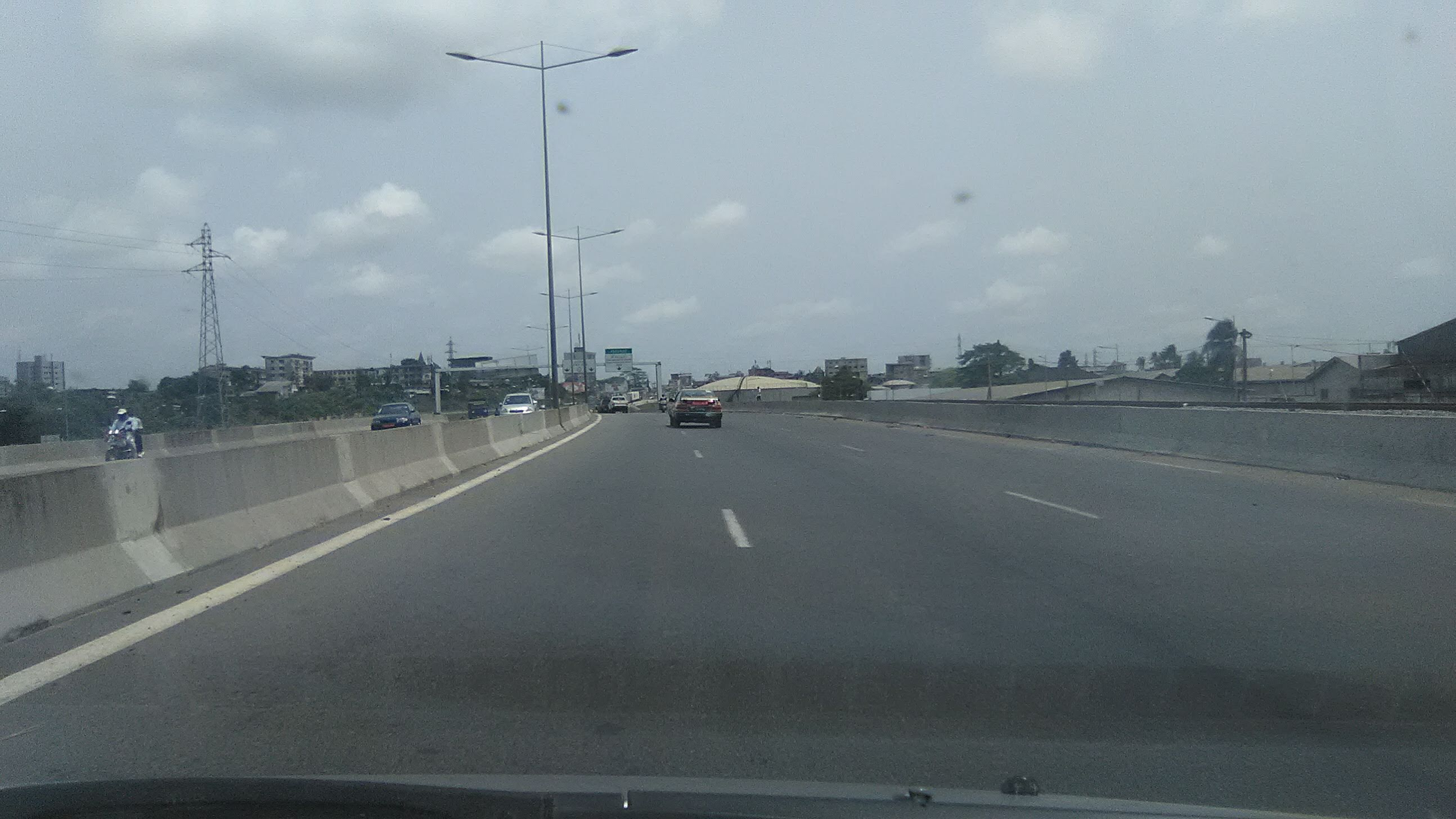
Bridge over the Wouri River in Douala

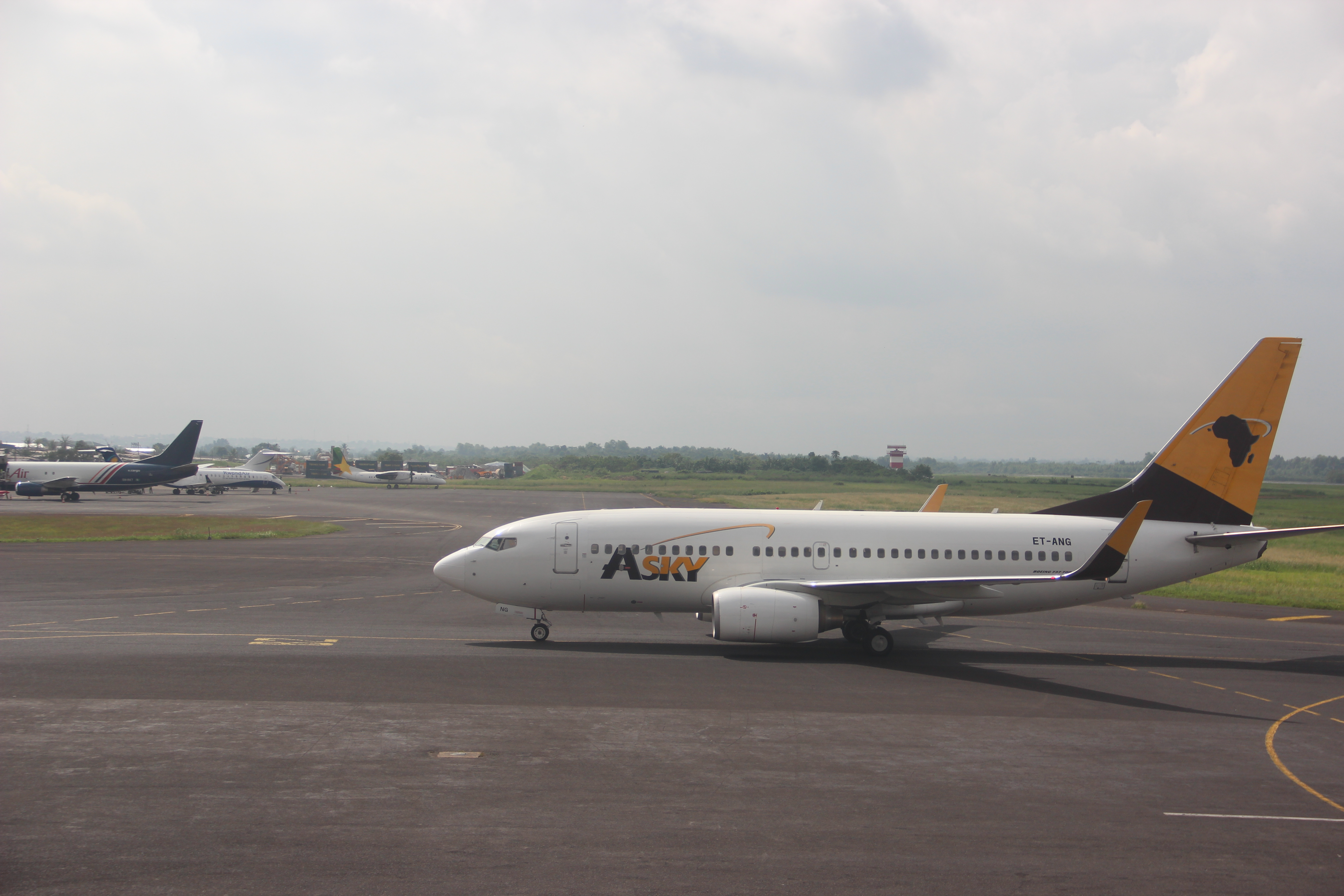
Douala International Airport flight line

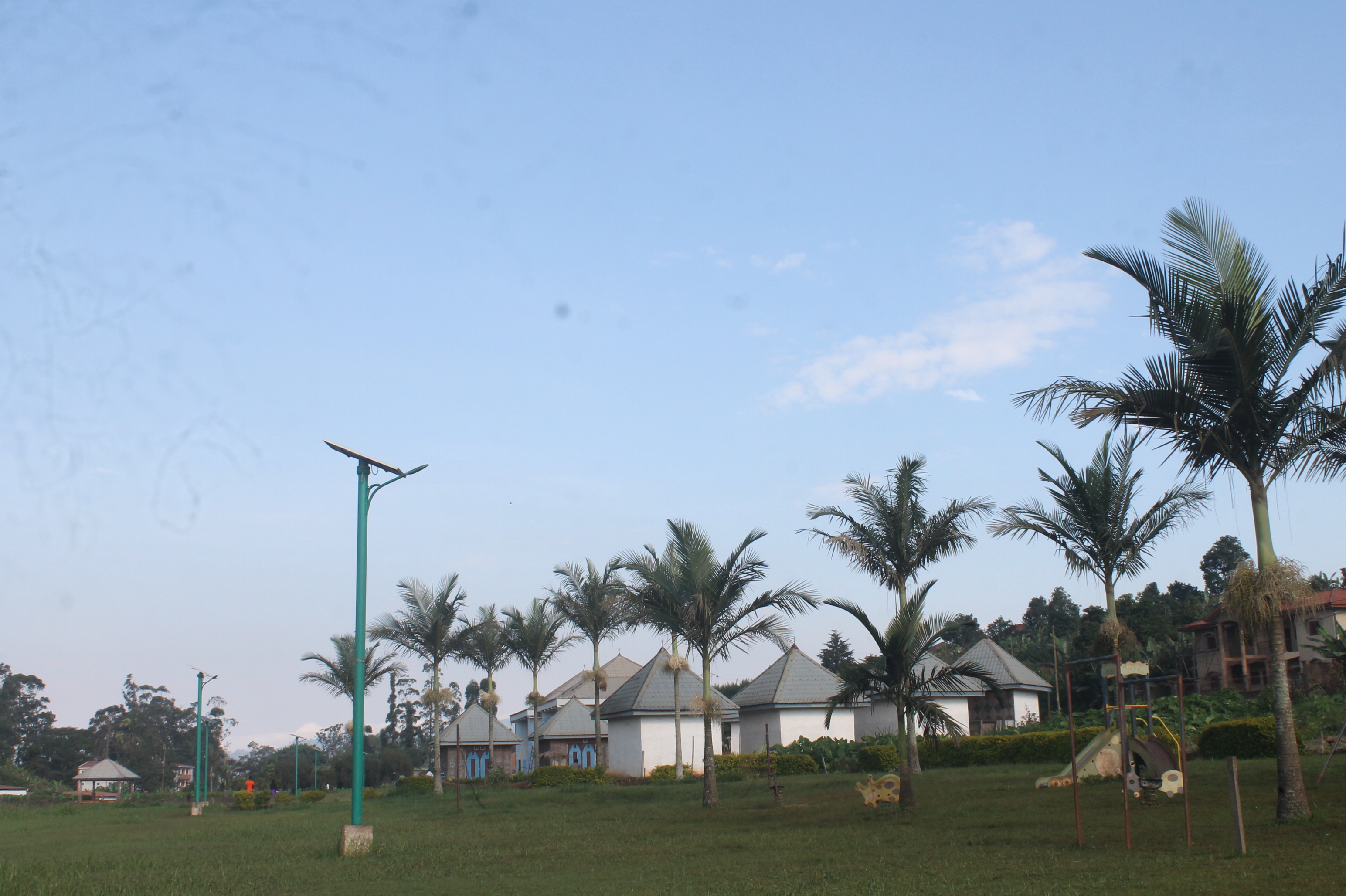
View of some buildings of the Civilizations Museum in Dschang

==== D ====
Commune	Département	Province
Dargala	Diamaré	Extrême-Nord
Darak	Diamaré	Extrême-Nord
Datcheka	Mayo-Danay	Extrême-Nord
Dembo	Bénoué	Nord
Demding	Koung-Khi	Ouest
Deuk	Mbam-et-Inoubou	Centre
Diang	Lom-et-Djérem	Est
Dibamba	Sanaga-Maritime	Littoral
Dibang	Nyong-et-Kéllé	Centre
Dibombari	Mungo	Littoral
Dikome-Balue	Ndian	Sud-Ouest
Dimako	Haut-Nyong	Est
Dir	Mbéré	Adamaoua
Dizangué	Sanaga-maritime	Littoral
Djohong	Mbéré	Adamaoua
Djoum	Dja et Lobo	Sud
Douala	Wouri	Littoral
Doumaintang	Haut-Nyong	Est
Doumé	Haut-Nyong	Est
Dschang	Menoua	Ouest
Dzeng	Nyong-et-So'o	Centre
Dziguilao	Mayo-kani	Extrême-Nord

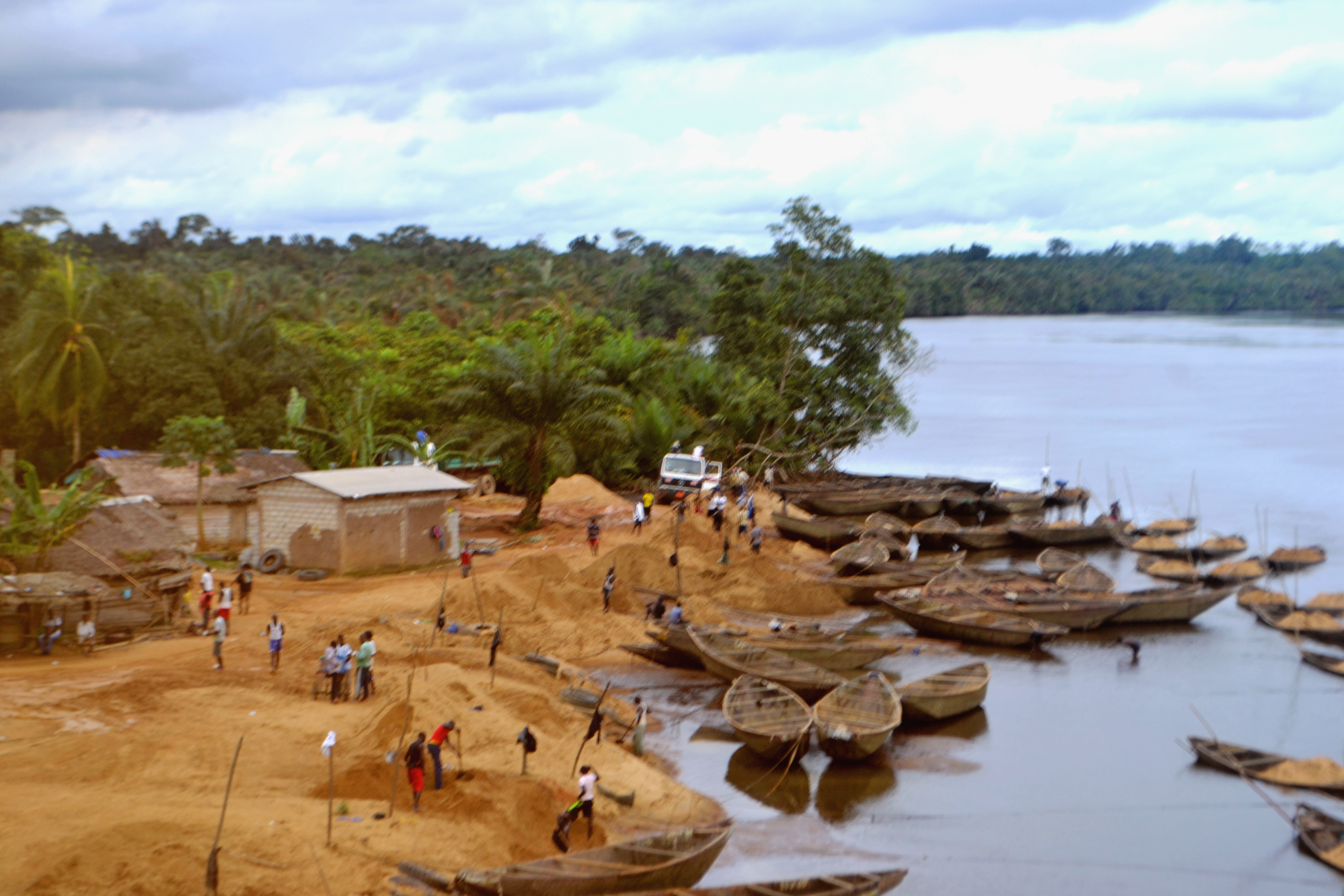
Sand quarry at Dibamba

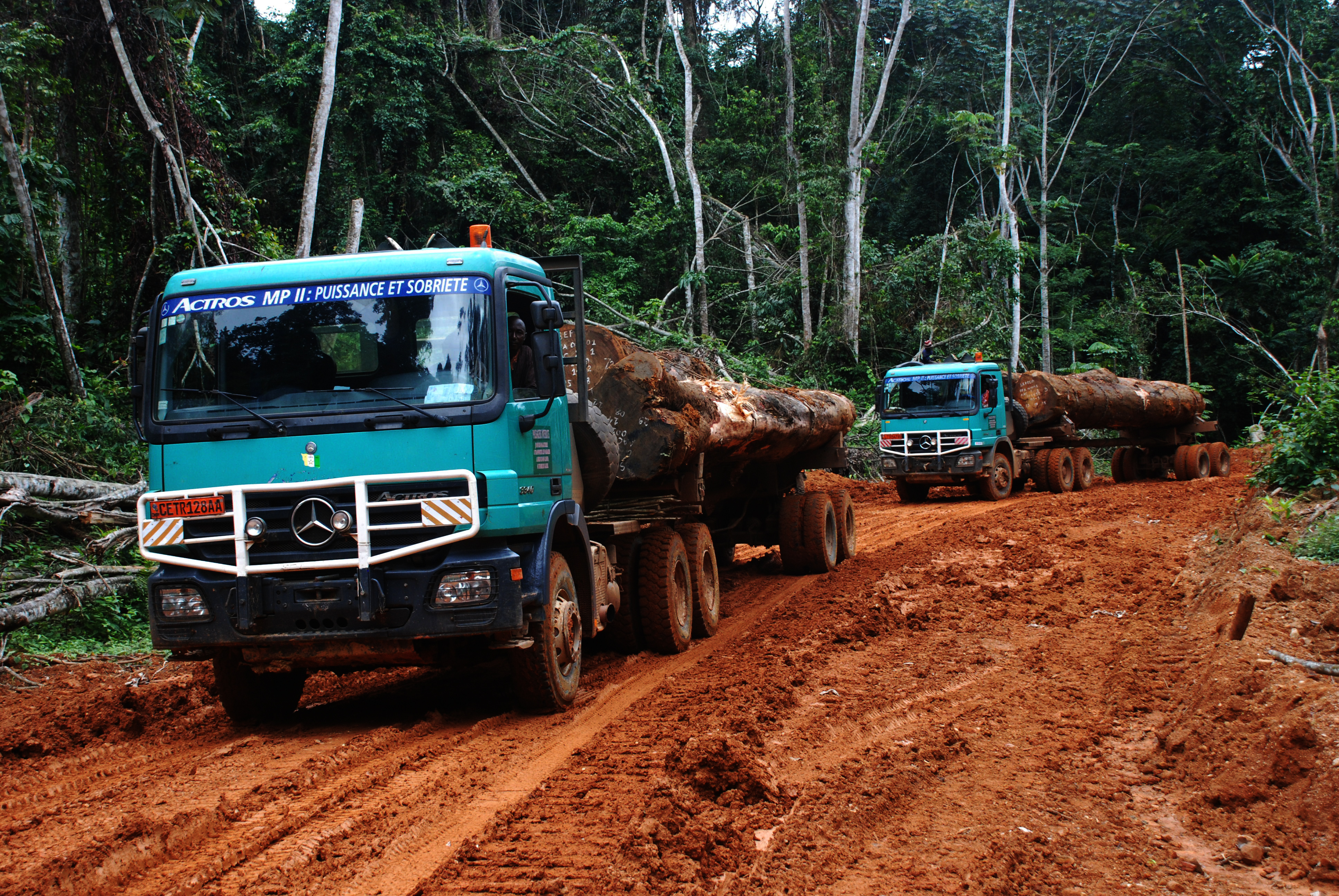
Eseka Forest

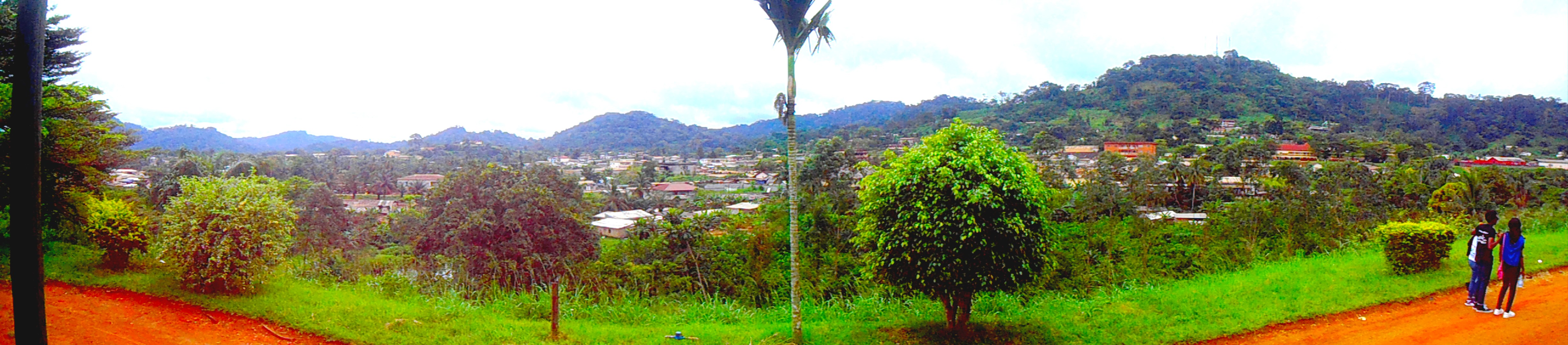
View of Eseka settlement area

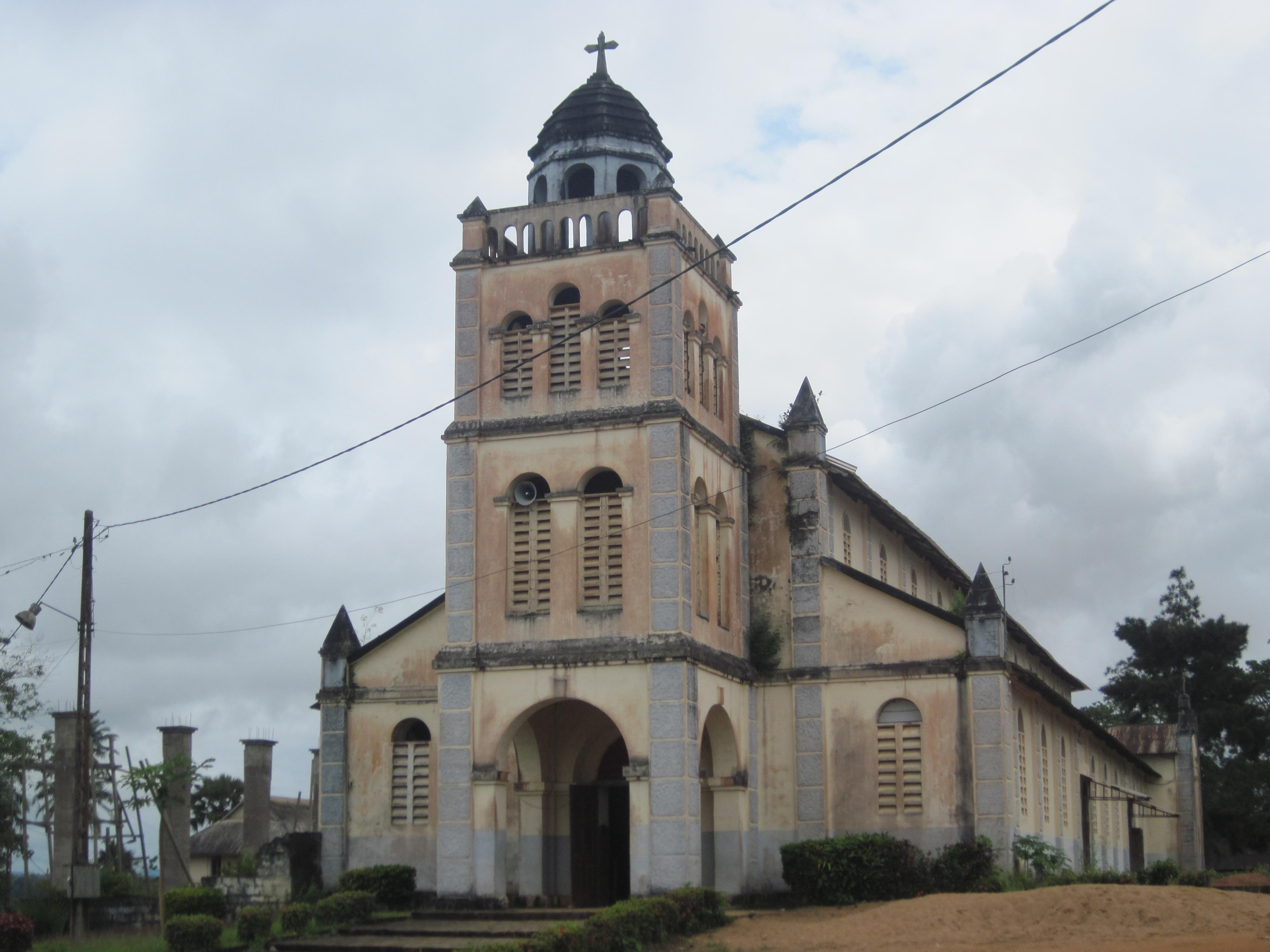
A Cathedral in Edea

==== E ====
Commune	Département	Province
Ebebda	Lékié	Centre
Ebolowa	Mvila	Sud
Ebone	Mungo	Littoral
Édéa	Sanaga maritime	Littoral
Edzendouan	Méfou-et-Afamba	Centre
Efoulan	Mvila	Sud
Ekondo-Titi	Ndian	Sud-Ouest
Elak-Oku	Bui	Nord-Ouest
Elig-Mfomo	Lékié	Centre
Endom	Nyong-et-Mfoumou	Centre
Éséka	Nyong et Kellé	Centre
Esse	Méfou-et-Afamba	Centre
Evodoula	Lékié	Centre
Eyumodjock	Manyu	Sud-Ouest

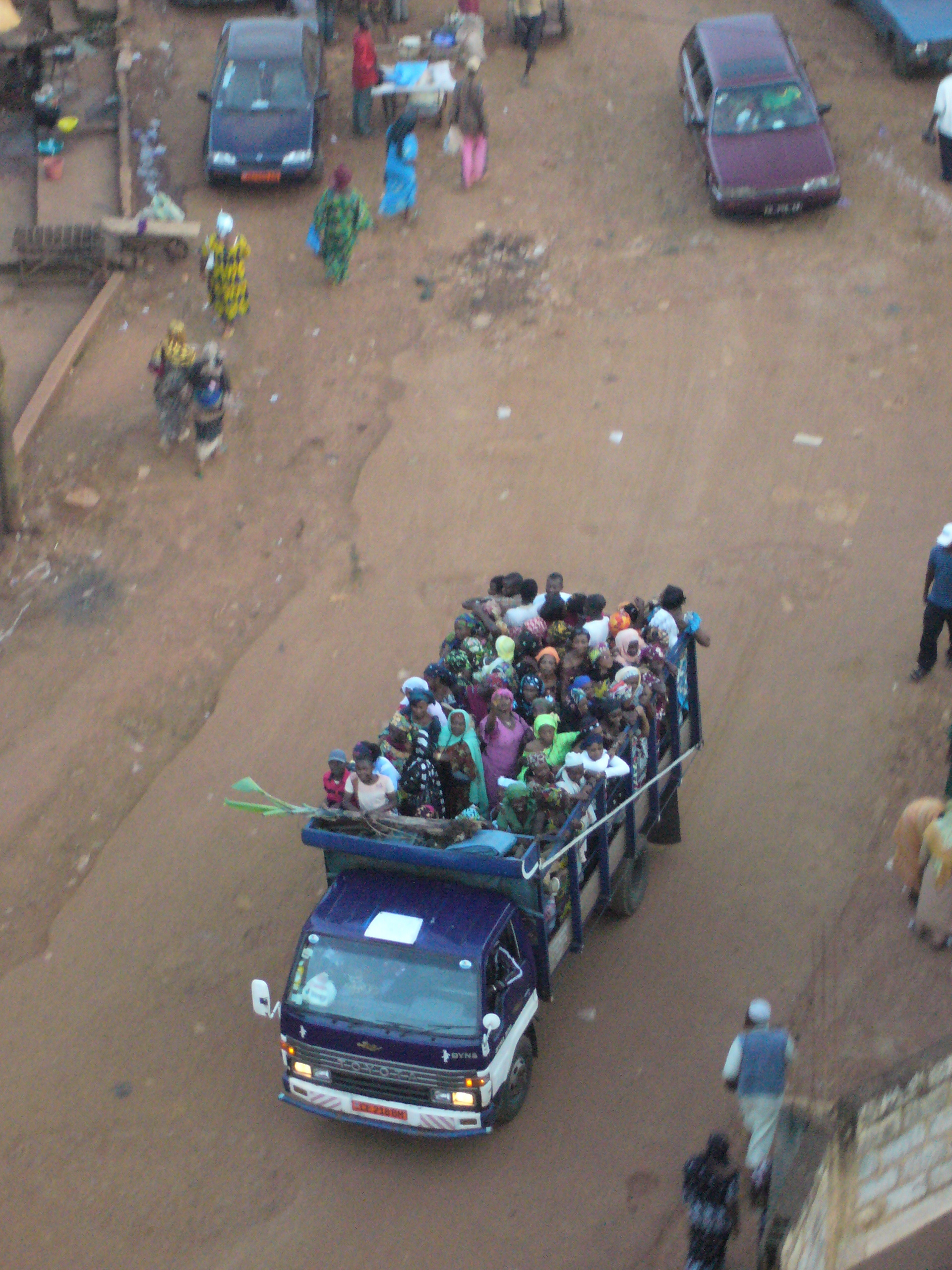
Foumban

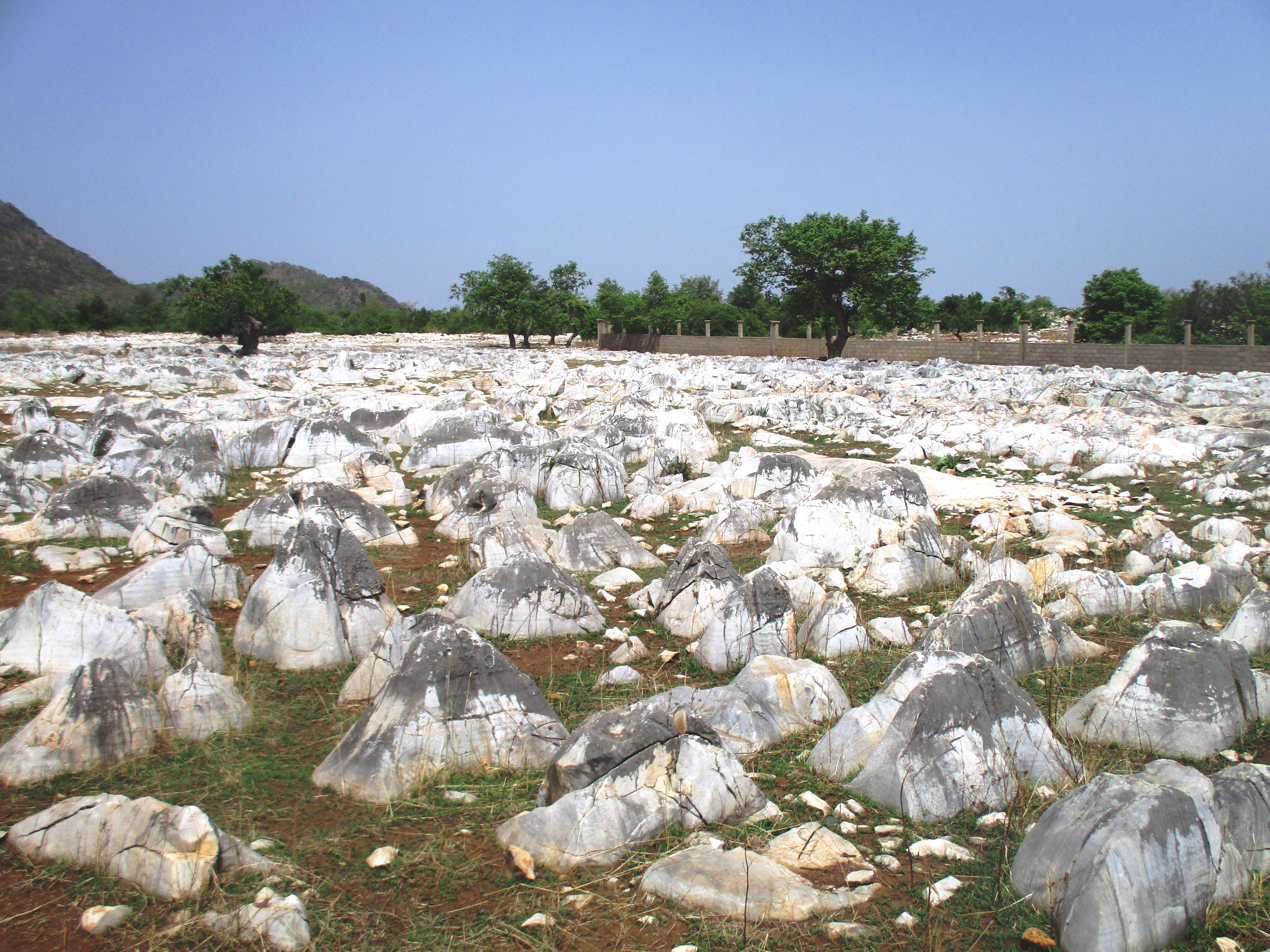
Archaeological site in Bidzar-Figuil

==== F ====
Commune	Département	Province
Figuil	Mayo-Louti	Nord
Fokoué	Menoua	Ouest
Fonfuka	Boyo	Nord-Ouest
Fongo-Tongo	Menoua	Ouest
Fotokol	Logone-et-Chari	Extrême-Nord
Foumban	Noun	Ouest
Foumbot	Noun	Ouest
Fundong	Boyo	Nord-Ouest
Furu-Awa	Menchum	Nord-Ouest

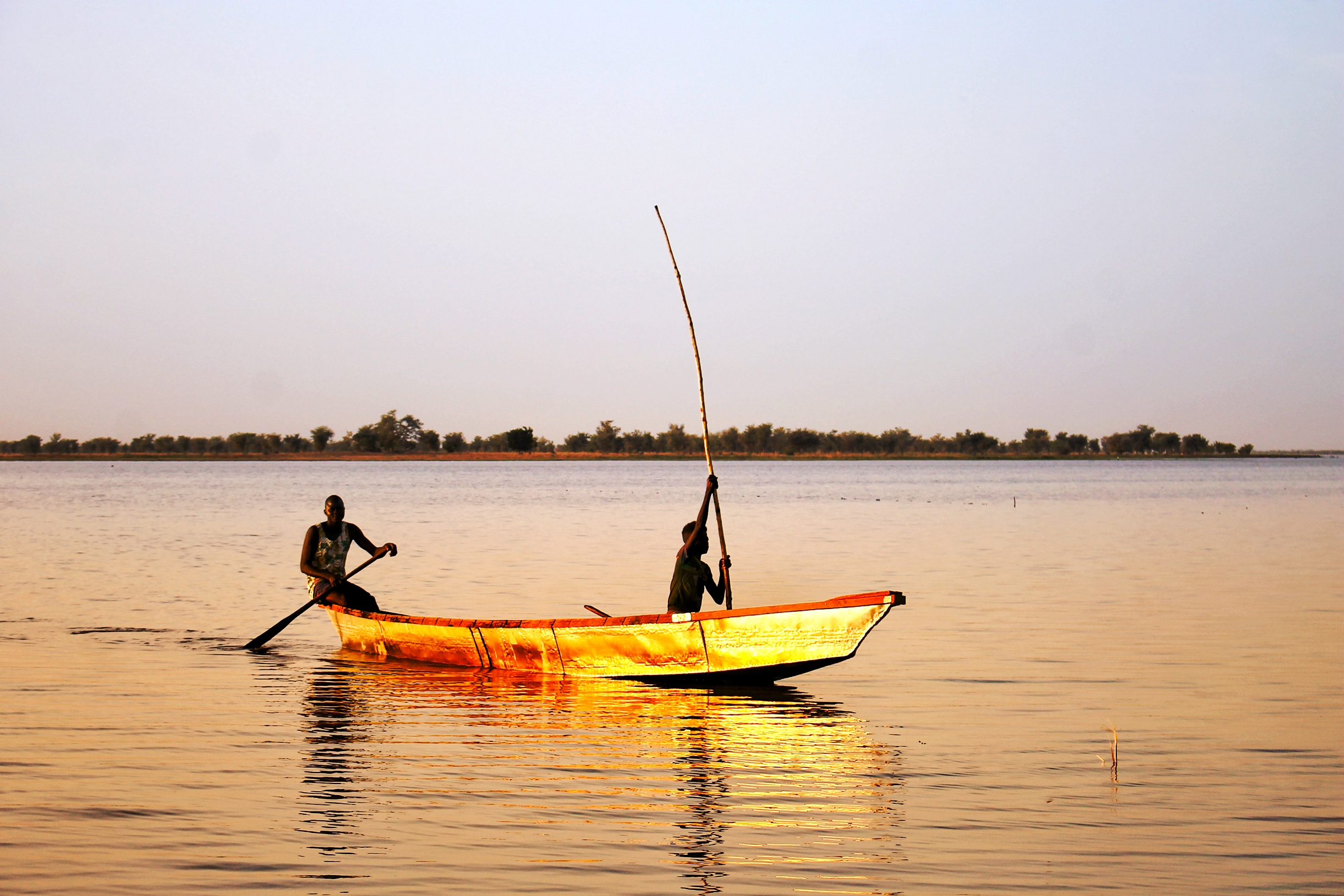
Lake Guere

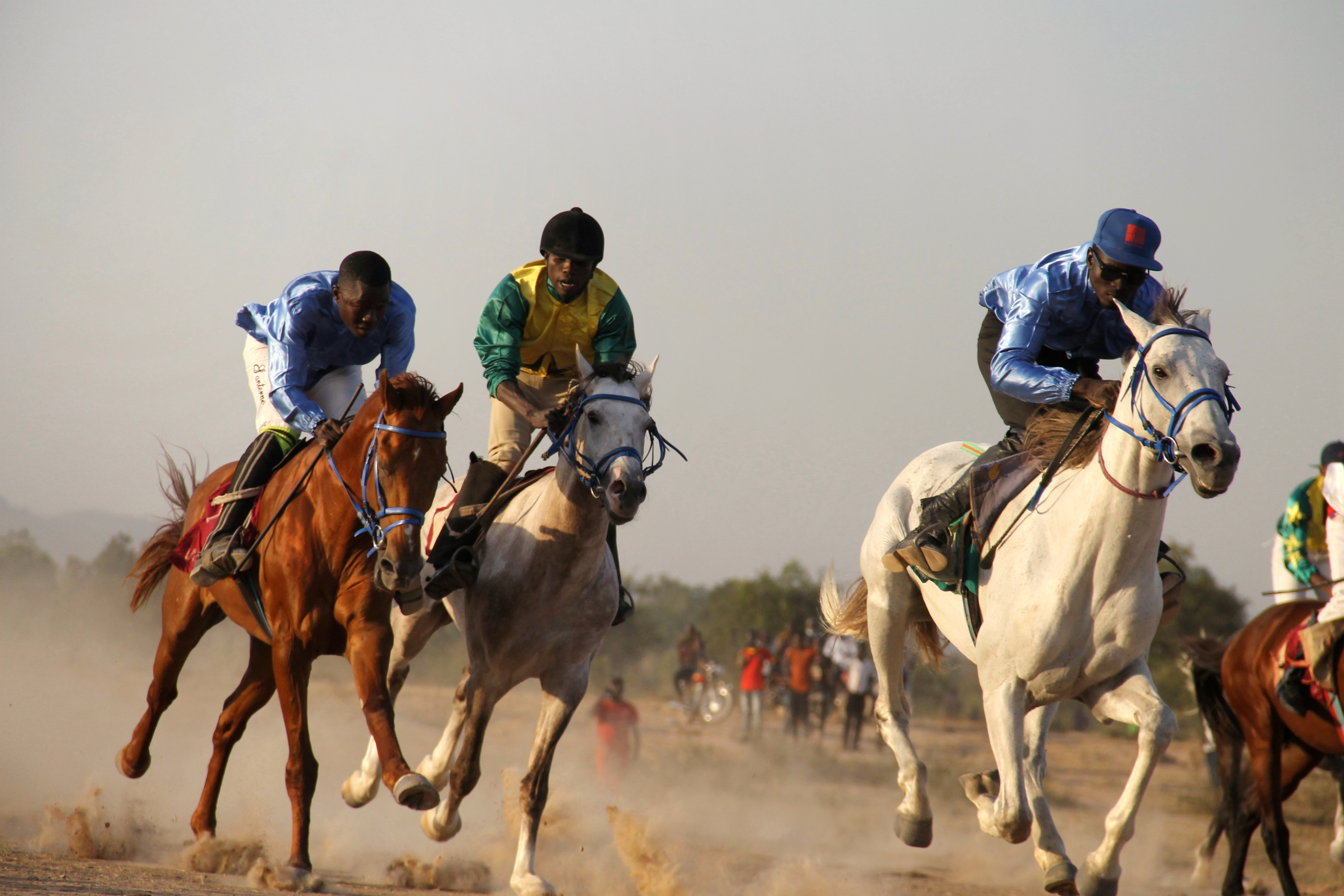
Horse Riders in Gashiga community

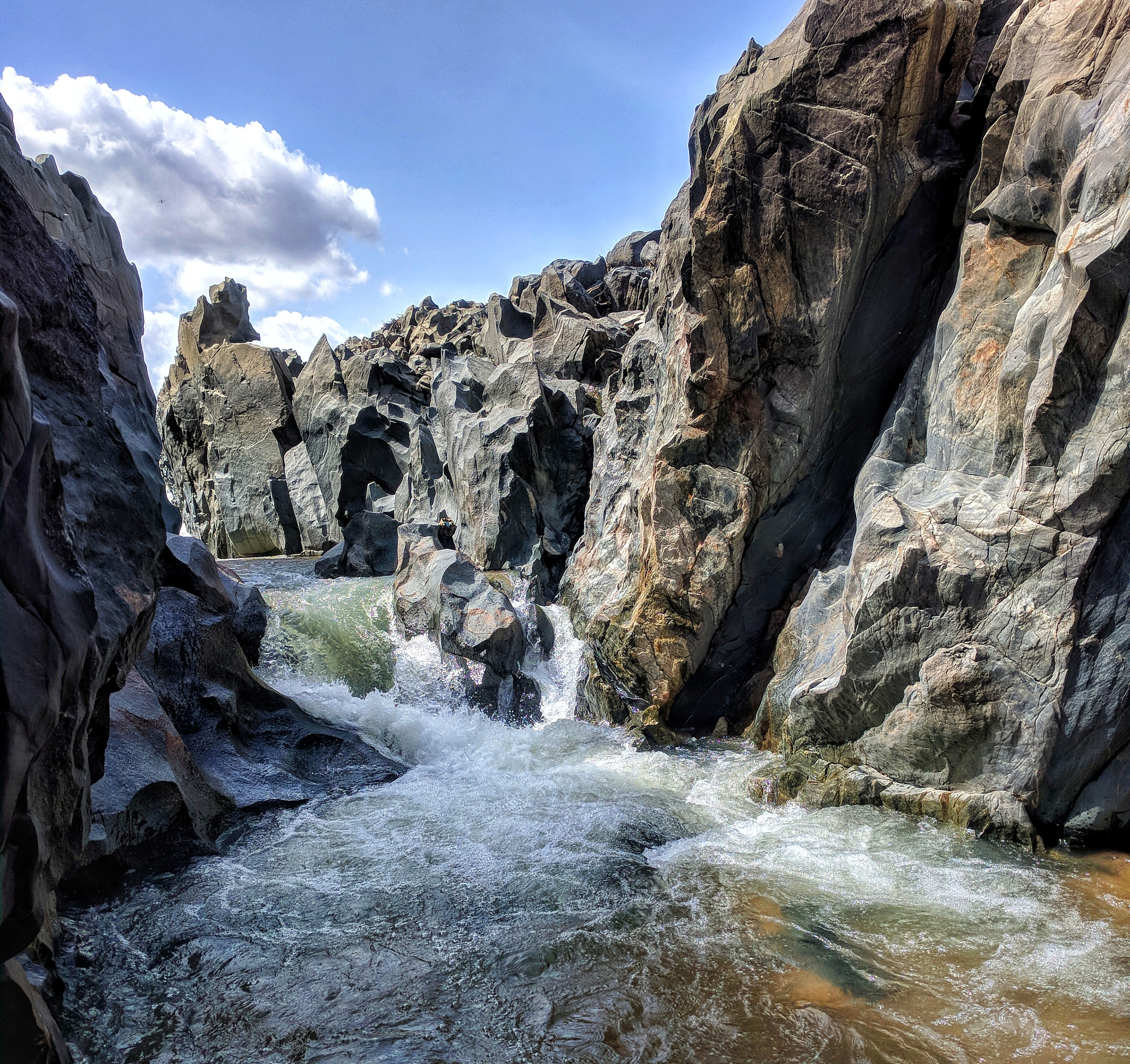
Kola Gorge is a touristic site in Mayo-Louti. It is located 5 km from Guider town

==== G ====
Commune	Département	Province
Galim	Bamboutos	Ouest
Galim-Tignère	Faro-et-Déo	Adamaoua
Gari-Gombo	Boumba-et-Ngoko	Est
Garoua	Bénoué	Nord
Garoua-Boulaï	Lom-et-Djérem	Est
Gashiga	Bénoué	Nord
Gawaza	Diamaré	Extrême-Nord
Gobo	Mayo-Danay	Extrême-Nord
Goulfey	Logone-et-Chari	Extrême-Nord
Gueme	Mayo-Danay	Extrême-Nord
Guere	Mayo-Danay	Extrême-Nord
Guider	Mayo-Louti	Nord
Guider	Mayo-Rey	Nord
Guidiguis	Mayo-kani	Extrême-Nord

==== H ====
Commune	Département	Province
Hile-Alifa	Logone-et-Chari	Extrême-Nord
Hina	Mayo-Tsanaga	Extrême-Nord

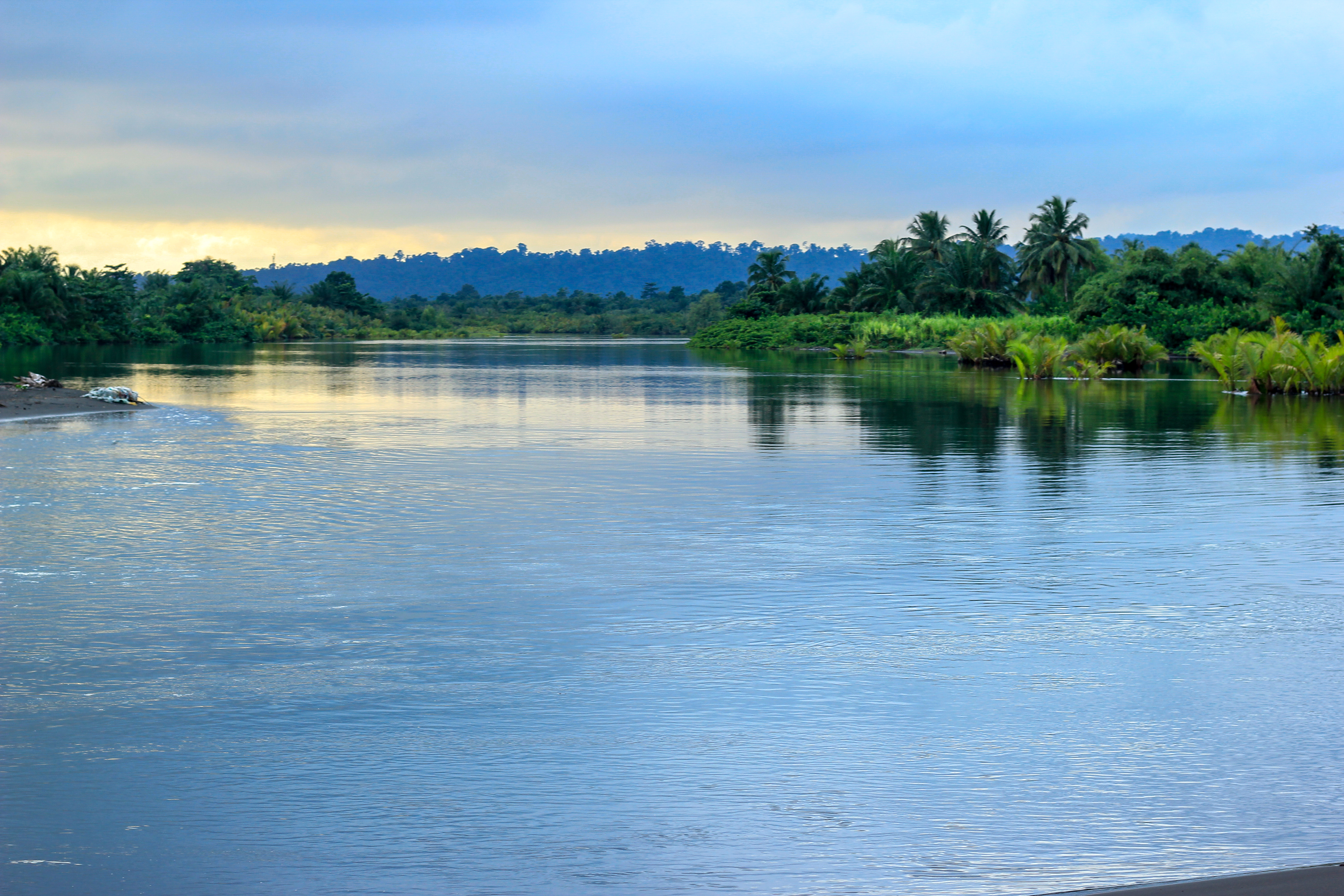
Idenau, South West Region

==== I ====
Commune	Département	Province
Idabato	Ndian	Sud-Ouest
West Coast	Fako	Sud-Ouest
Isanguele	Ndian	Sud-Ouest

==== J ====
Commune	Département	Province
Jakiri	Bui	Nord-Ouest

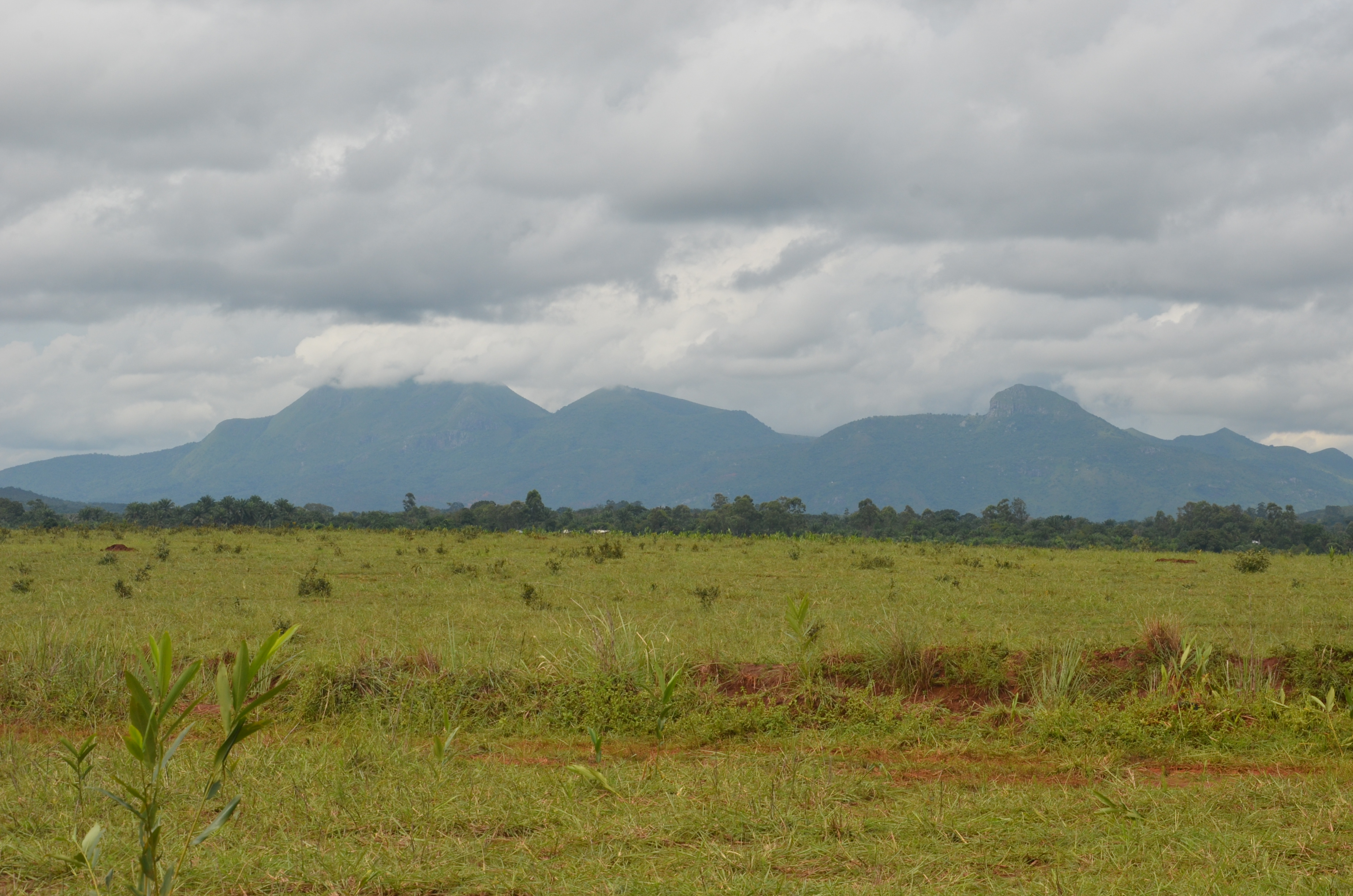
Physical environment in Koutaba

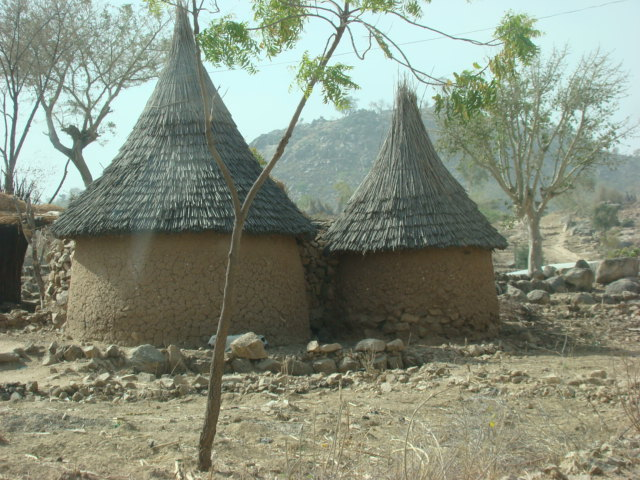
Housing structures in Koza

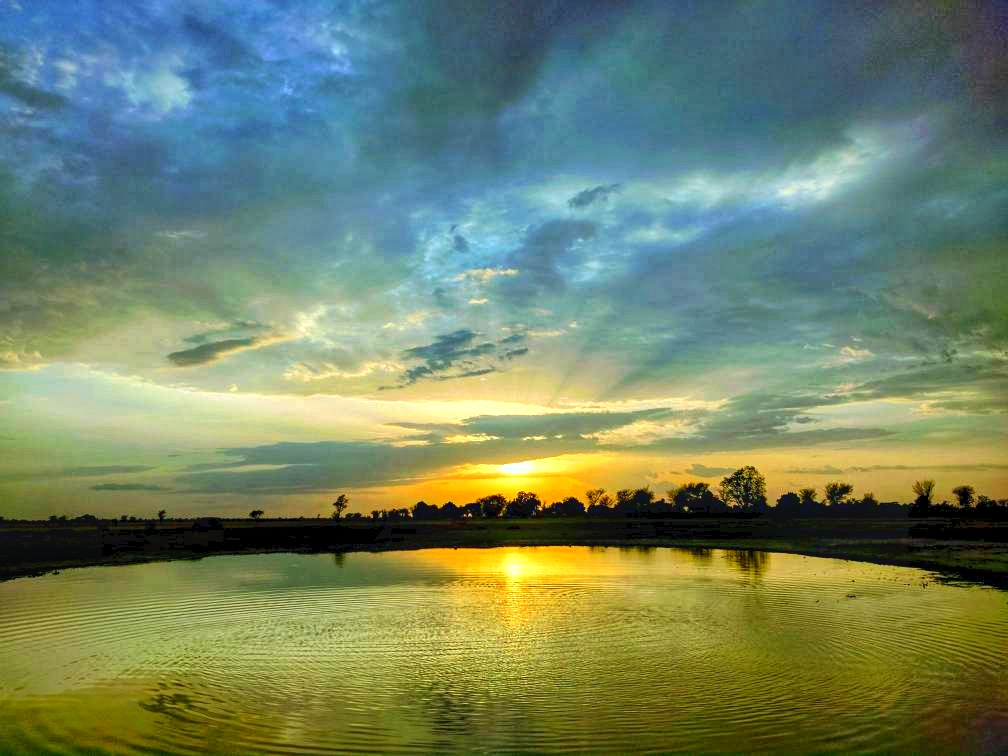
Beautiful sunset in Kalfou

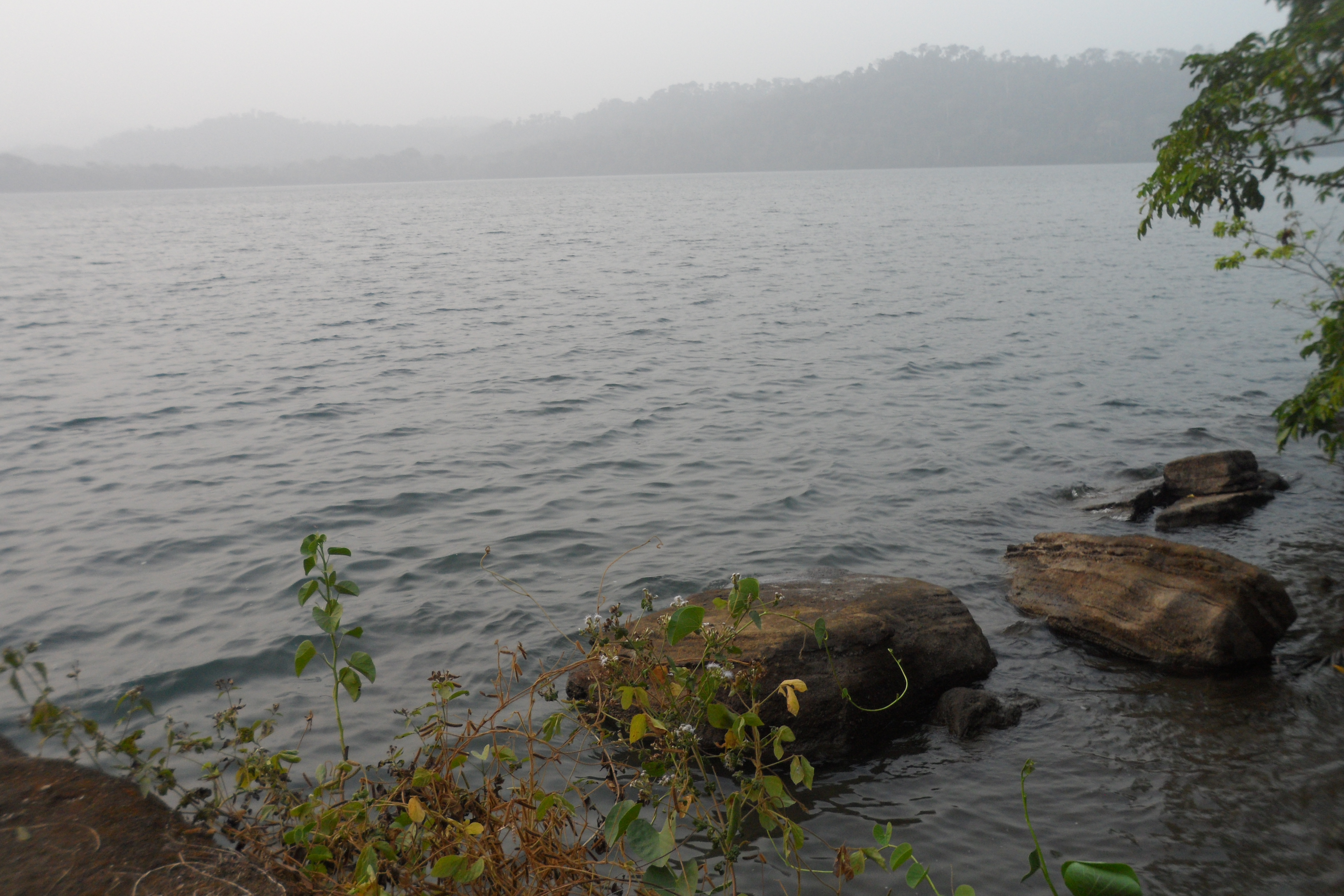
Lake Barombi, Kumba

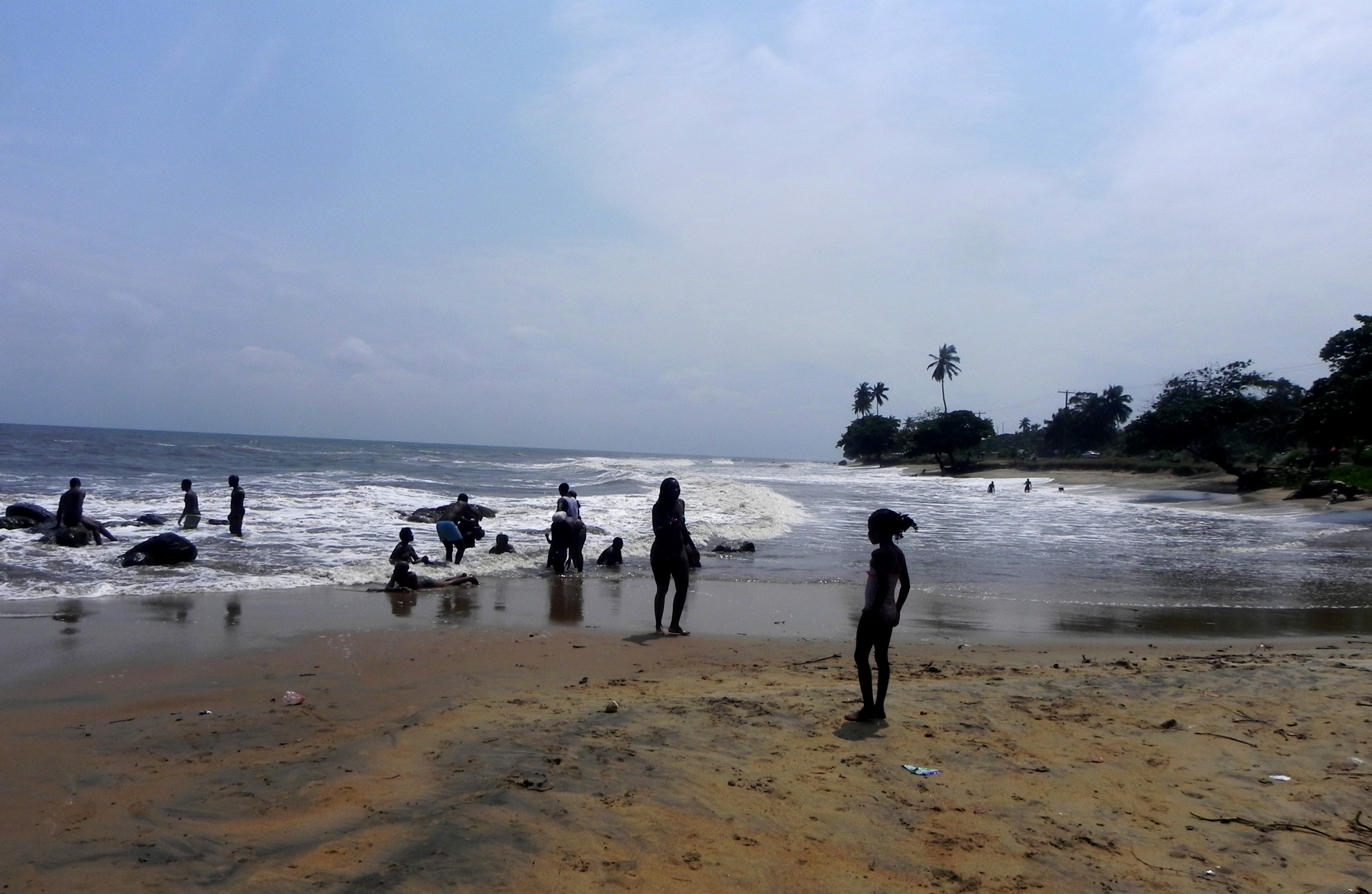
Kribi Beach. A beautiful touristic site in Cameroon

==== K ====
Commune	Département	Province
Kaélé	Mayo-kani	Extrême-Nord
Kai-Kai	Mayo-Danay	Extrême-Nord
Kalfou	Mayo-Danay	Extrême-Nord
Kay-Hay	Mayo-Danay	Extrême-Nord
Kékem	Haut-Nkam	Ouest
Kentzou	Kadey	Est
Kette	Kadey	Est
Kiiki	Mbam-et-Inoubou	Centre
Kobdombo	Nyong-et-Mfoumou	Centre
Kolofata	Mayo-sava	Extrême-Nord
Kombo-Abedimo	Ndian	Sud-Ouest
Kombo-Idinti	Ndian	Sud-Ouest
Kon-Yambetta	Mbam-et-Inoubou	Centre
Kongso-Bamougoum	Mifi	Ouest
Kontcha	Faro-et-Déo	Adamaoua
Konye	Meme	Sud-Ouest
Kouoptamo	Noun	Ouest
Kousséri	Logone-et-Chari	Extrême-Nord
Koutaba	Noun	Ouest
Koza	Mayo-Tsanaga	Extrême-Nord
Kribi	Océan	Sud
Kumba	Meme	Sud-Ouest
Kumbo	Bui	Nord-Ouest

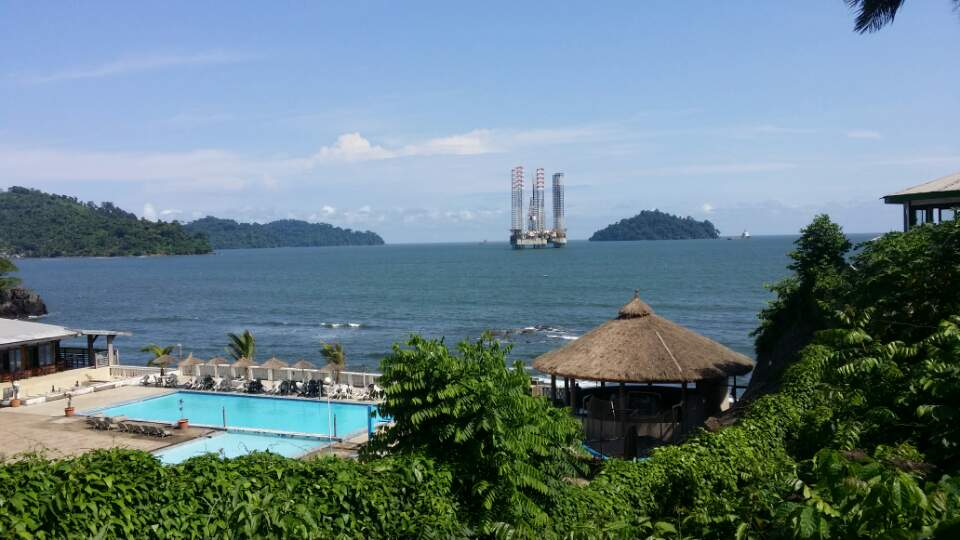
Limbe Atlantic Ocean

==== L ====
Commune	Département	Province
Lafé-Baleng	Mifi	Ouest
Lagdo	Bénoué	Nord
Lembe-Yezoum	Haute- Sanaga	Centre
Limbé	Fako	Sud-Ouest
Lobo	Lékié	Centre
Logone-Birni	Logone-et-Chari	Extrême-Nord
Lokoundje	Océan	Sud
Lolodorf	Océan	Sud
Lomié	Haut-Nyong	Est
Loum	Mungo	Littoral

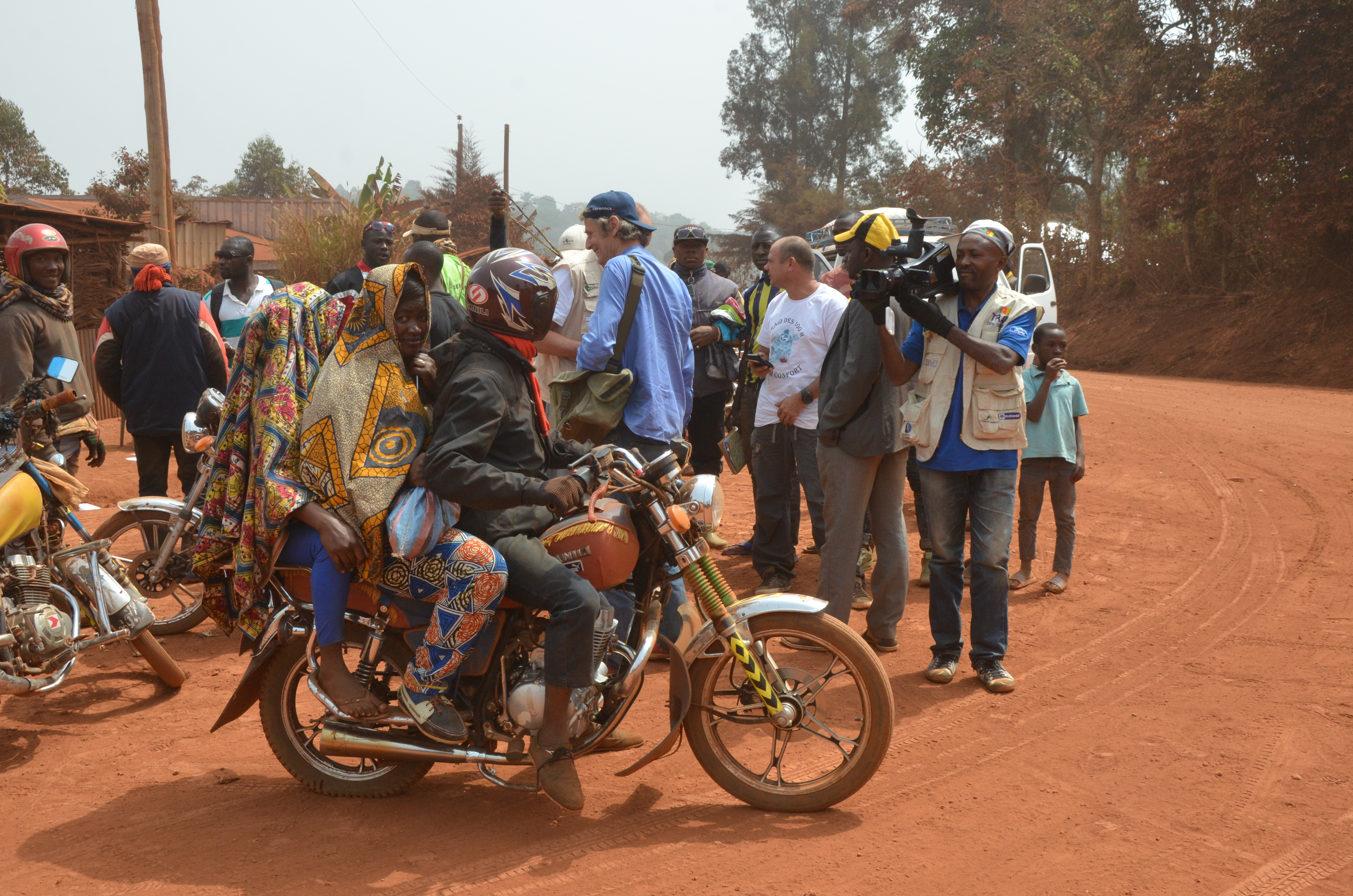
Motorbike park in Mbouda

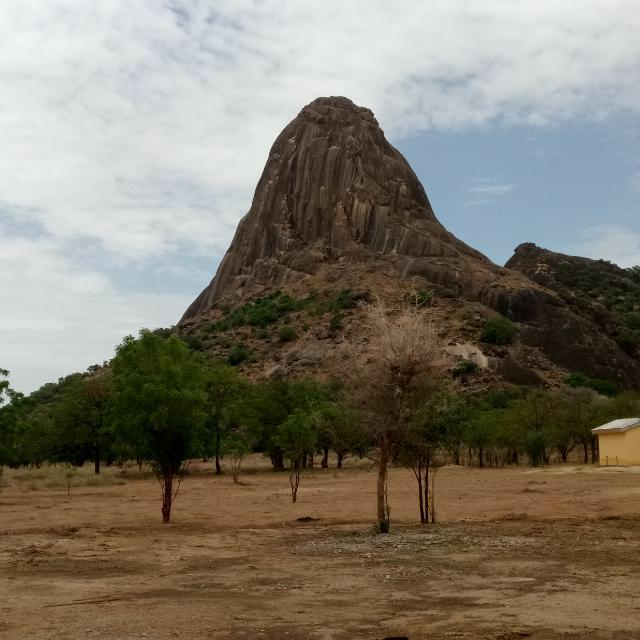
The peak of Mindif

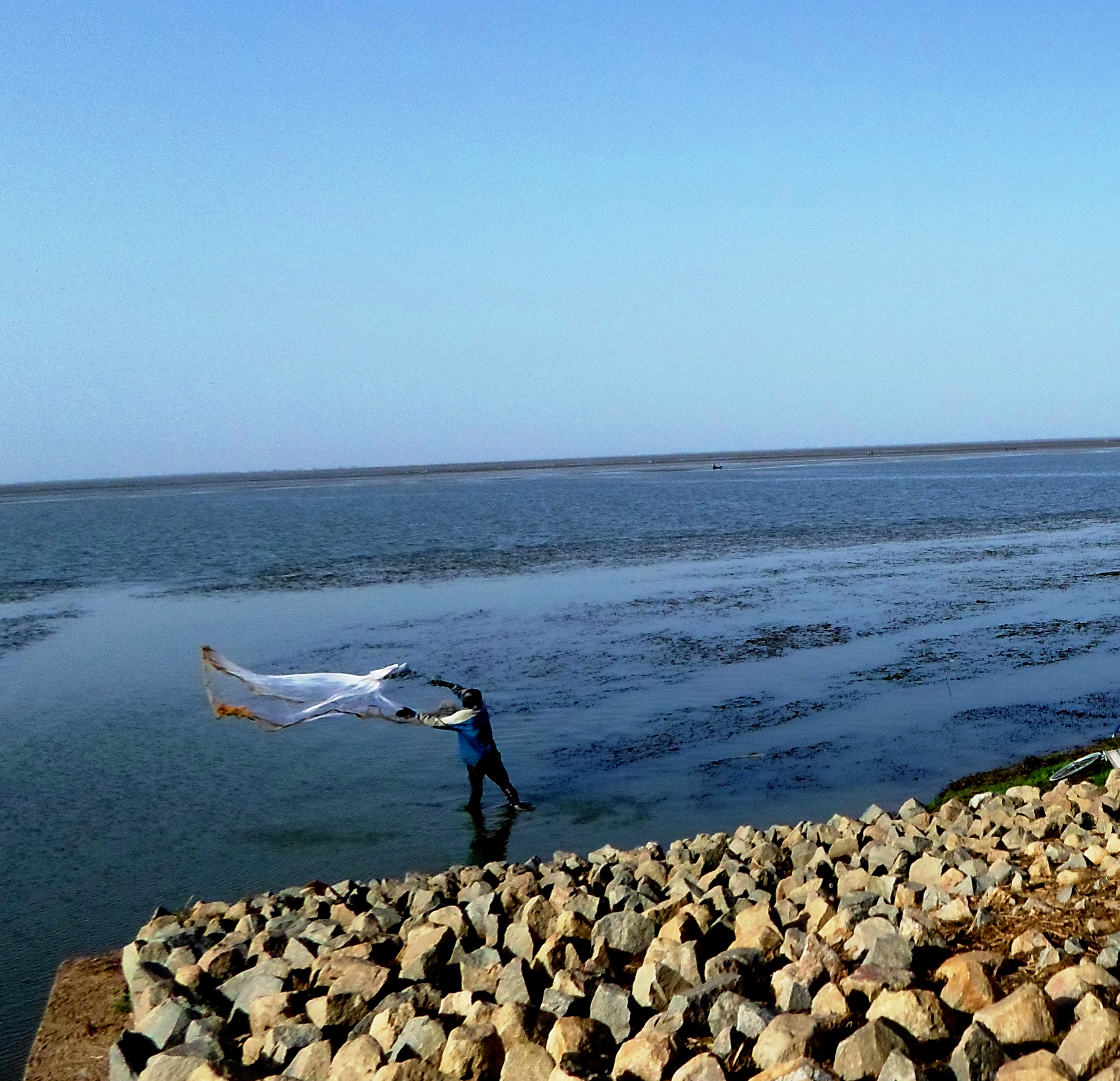
Fishing in Lake Maga

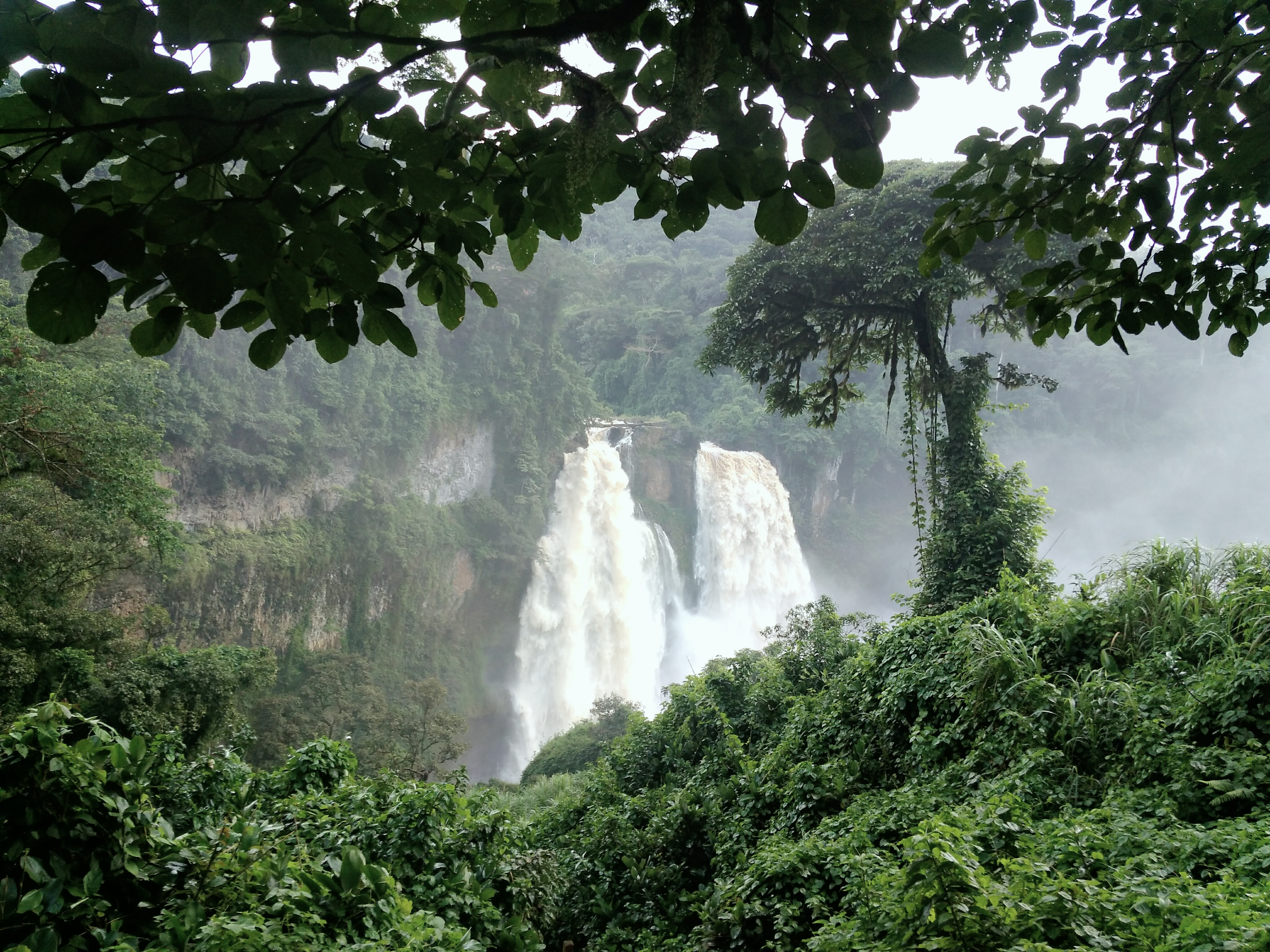
Ekom Nkam Waterfalls in Melong

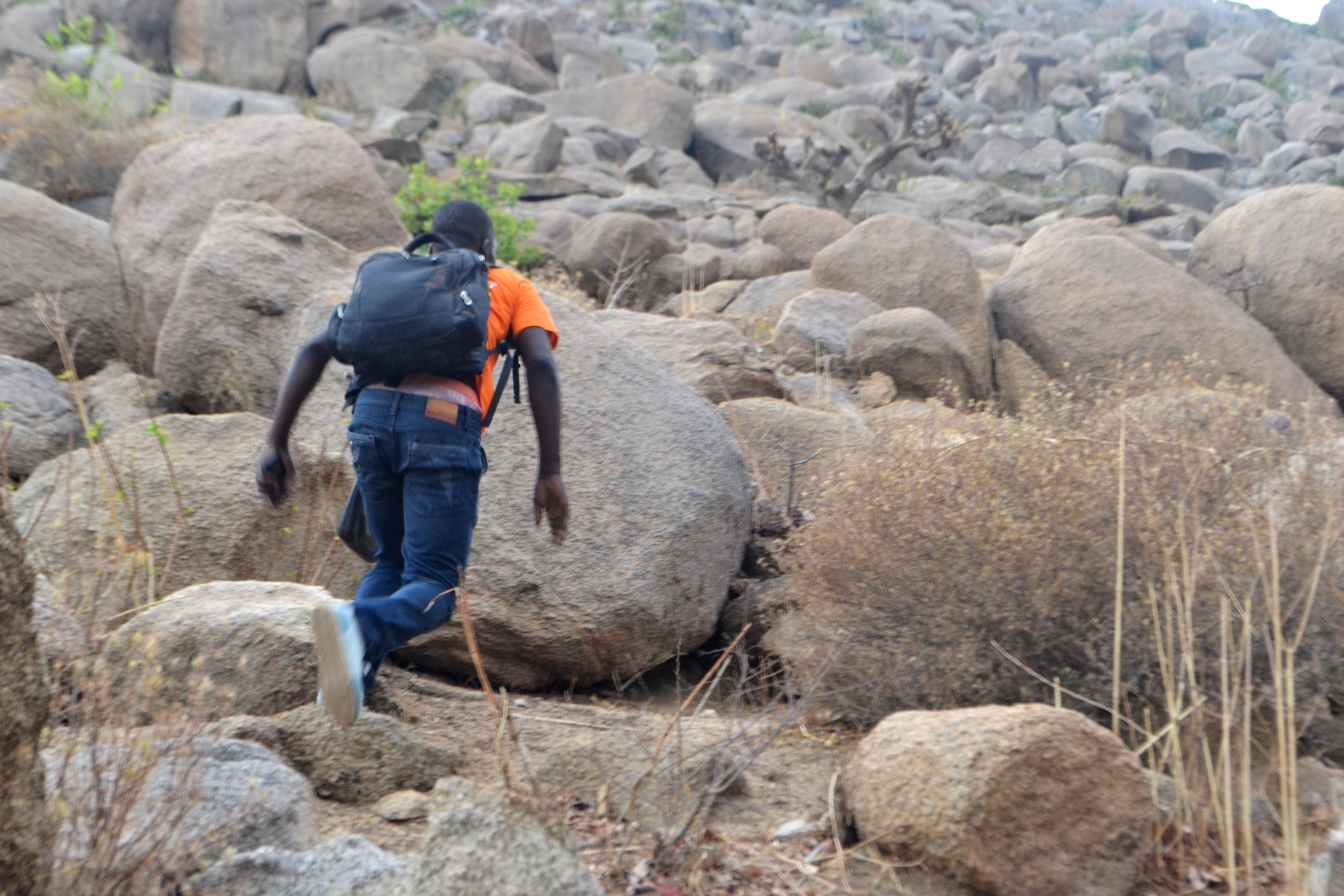
Hiking in Mora

==== M ====
Commune	Département	Province
Ma'an	Vallée du Ntem	Sud
Mabanga	Vina	Adamaoua
Maga	Mayo-Danay	Extrême-Nord
Magba	Noun	Ouest
Maikari	Logone-et-Chari	Extrême-Nord
Makak	Nyong-et-Kéllé	Centre
Makénéné	Mbam-et-Inoubou	Centre
Malentouen	Noun	Ouest
Mamfé	Manyu	Sud-Ouest
Mandingring	Mayo-Rey	Nord
Mandjou	Lom-et-Djérem	Est
Manjo	Mungo	Littoral
Manoka	Wouri	Littoral
Maroua	Diamaré	Extrême-Nord
Massangam	Noun	Ouest
Massock	Sanaga-maritime	Littoral
Matomb	Nyong-et-Kéllé	Centre
Mayo-Baléo	Faro-et-Déo	Adamaoua
Mayo-Darlé	Mayo-Banyo	Adamaoua
Mayo-Hourna	Bénoué	Nord
Mayo-Oulo	Mayo-Louti	Nord
Mbalmayo	Nyong et So'o	Centre
Mbandjock	Haute- Sanaga	Centre
Mbang	Kadey	Est
Mbanga	Mungo	Littoral
Mbangassina	Mbam-et-Kim	Centre
Mbankomo	Méfou-et-Akono	Centre
Mbe	Vina	Adamaoua
Mbengwi	Momo	Nord-Ouest
Mbiame	Bui	Nord-Ouest
Mboma	Haut-Nyong	Est
Mbonge	Meme	Sud-Ouest
Mbouda	Bamboutos	Ouest
Meiganga	Mbéré	Adamaoua
Melong	Mungo	Littoral
Mengang	Nyong-et-Mfoumou	Centre
Mengong	Mvila	Sud
Mengueme	Nyong-et-So'o	Centre
Menji	Lebialem	Sud-Ouest
Meri	Diamaré	Extrême-Nord
Messamena	Haut-Nyong	Est
Messok	Haut-Nyong	Est
Messondo	Nyong-et-Kéllé	Centre
Meyomessala	Dja-et-Lobo	Sud
Meyomessi	Dja-et-Lobo	Sud
Mfou	Méfou-et-Afamba	Centre
Mindif	Mayo-kani	Extrême-Nord
Mindourou	Haut-Nyong	Est
Minta	Haute- Sanaga	Centre
Mintom	Dja et Lobo	Sud
Misaje	Donga Mantung	Nord-Ouest
Modzogo	Mayo-Tsanaga	Extrême-Nord
Mogode	Mayo-Tsanaga	Extrême-Nord
Mokolo	Mayo-Tsanaga	Extrême-Nord
Moloundou	Boumba-et-Ngoko	Est
Mombo	Mungo	Littoral
Monatélé	Lékié	Centre
Mora	Mayo-sava	Extrême-Nord
Mouanko	Sanaga-maritime	Littoral
Moulvoudaye	Mayo-kani	Extrême-Nord
Moutourwa	Mayo-kani	Extrême-Nord
Mudemba	Ndian	Sud-Ouest
Muyuka	Fako	Sud-Ouest
Mvangane	Mvila	Sud
Mvengue	Océan	Sud

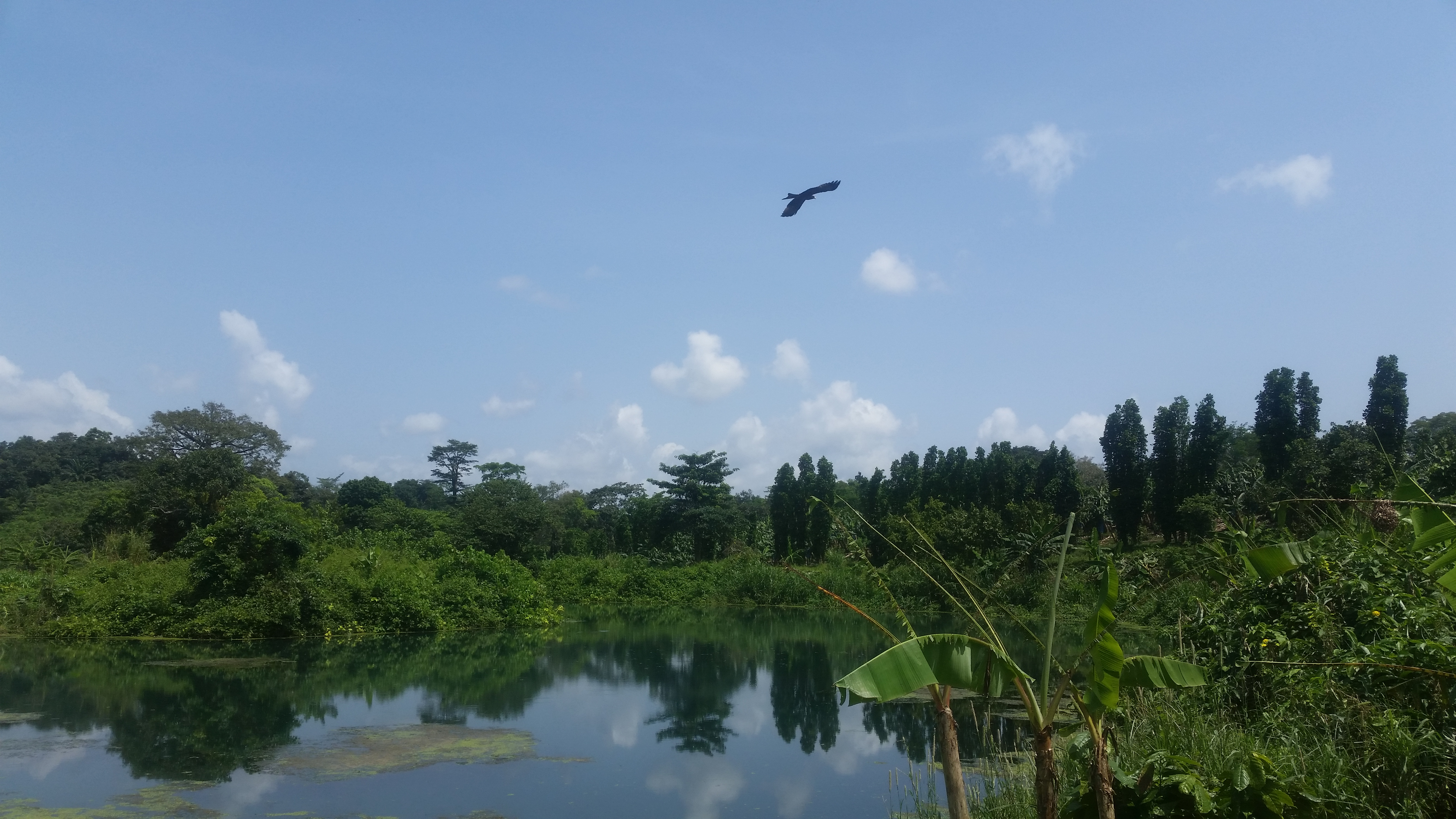
Artificial Lake in Njombe

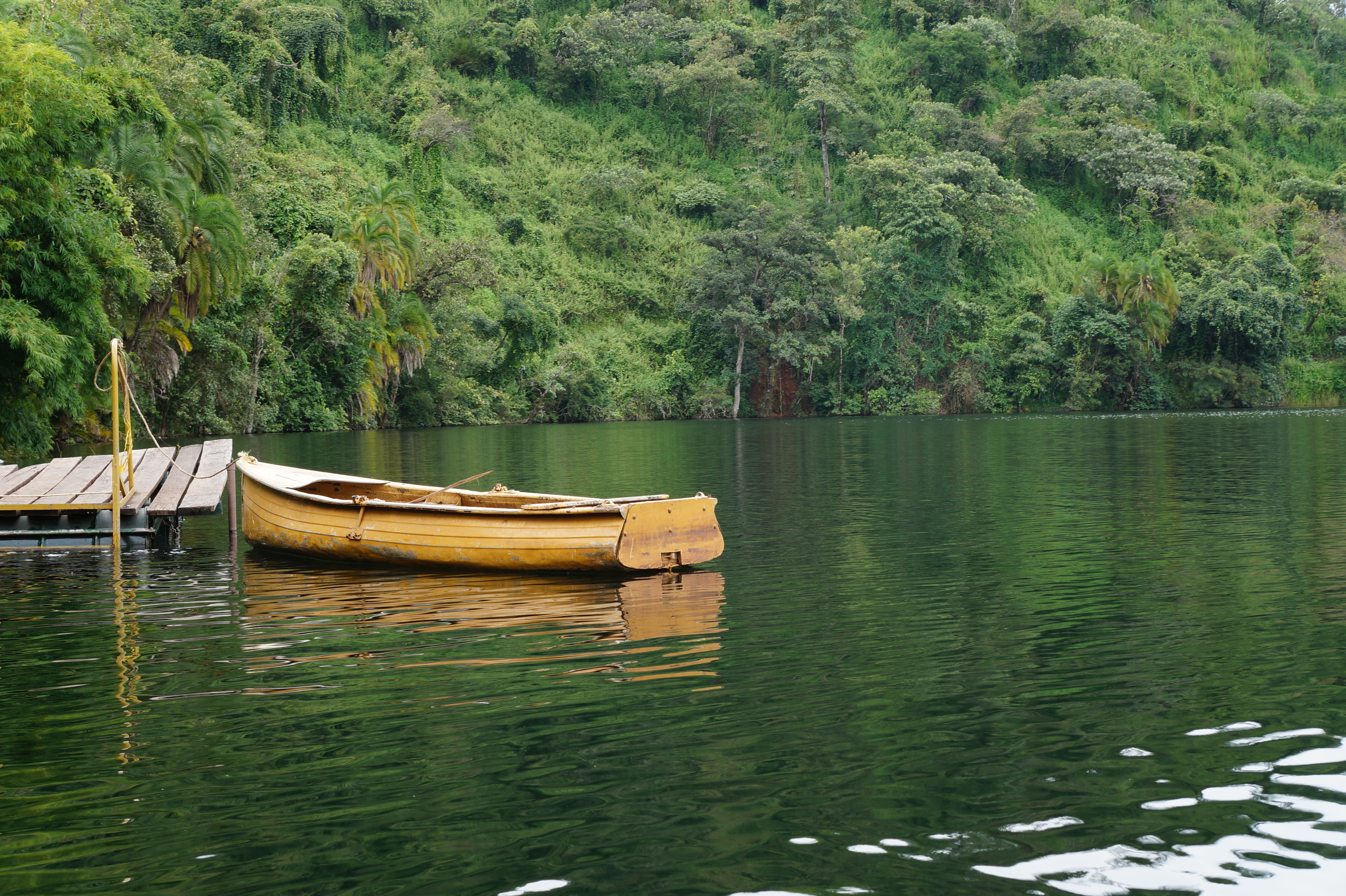
Lake Ngaoundaba located about forty km from the city of N'Gaoundéré

==== N ====
Commune	Département	Province
Nanga-Eboko	Haute- Sanaga	Centre
Ndelele	Kadey	Est
Ndikiniméki	Mbam-et-Inoubou	Centre
Ndobian	Nkam	Littoral
Ndom	Sanaga-maritime	Littoral
Ndop	Ngo-Ketunjia	Nord-Ouest
Ndoukoula	Diamaré	Extrême-Nord
Ndu	Donga Mantung	Nord-Ouest
Nganha	Vina	Adamaoua
Ngambé	Sanaga-maritime	Littoral
Ngambè-Tikar	Mbam-et-Kim	Centre
Ngaoui	Mbéré	Adamaoua
Ngaoundal	Djerem	Adamaoua
Ngaoundéré	Vina	Adamaoua
Ngog-Mapubi	Nyong-et-Kéllé	Centre
Ngomedzap	Nyong-et-So'o	Centre
Ngong	Bénoué	Nord
Ngoro	Mbam-et-Kim	Centre
Ngoulemakong	Mvila	Sud
Ngoumou	Méfou-et-Akono	Centre
Ngoura	Lom-et-Djérem	Est
Ngoyla	Haut-Nyong	Est
Nguelebok	Kadey	Est
Nguelemendouka	Haut-Nyong	Est
Ngui-Bassal	Nyong-et-Kéllé	Centre
Ngwei	Sanaga-Maritime	Littoral
Niete	Océan	Sud
Nitoukou	Mbam-et-Inoubou	Centre
Njikwa	Momo	Nord-Ouest
Njimom	Noun	Ouest
Njinikom	Boyo	Nord-Ouest
Njombé	Moungo	Littoral
Nkambé	Donga Mantung	Nord-Ouest
Nkolafamba	Méfou-et-Afamba	Centre
Nkolmetet	Nyong-et-So'o	Centre
Nkondjock	Nkam	Littoral
Nkongsamba	Mungo	Littoral
Nkongsamba	Moungo	Littoral
Nkong-Zem	Menoua	Ouest
Nkor	Bui	Nord-Ouest
Nkoteng	Haute- Sanaga	Centre
Nkum	Bui	Nord-Ouest
Nsem	Haute- Sanaga	Centre
Ntui	Mbam-et-Kim	Centre
Nwa	Donga Mantung	Nord-Ouest
Nyambaka	Vina	Adamaoua
Nyanon	Sanaga-maritime	Littoral

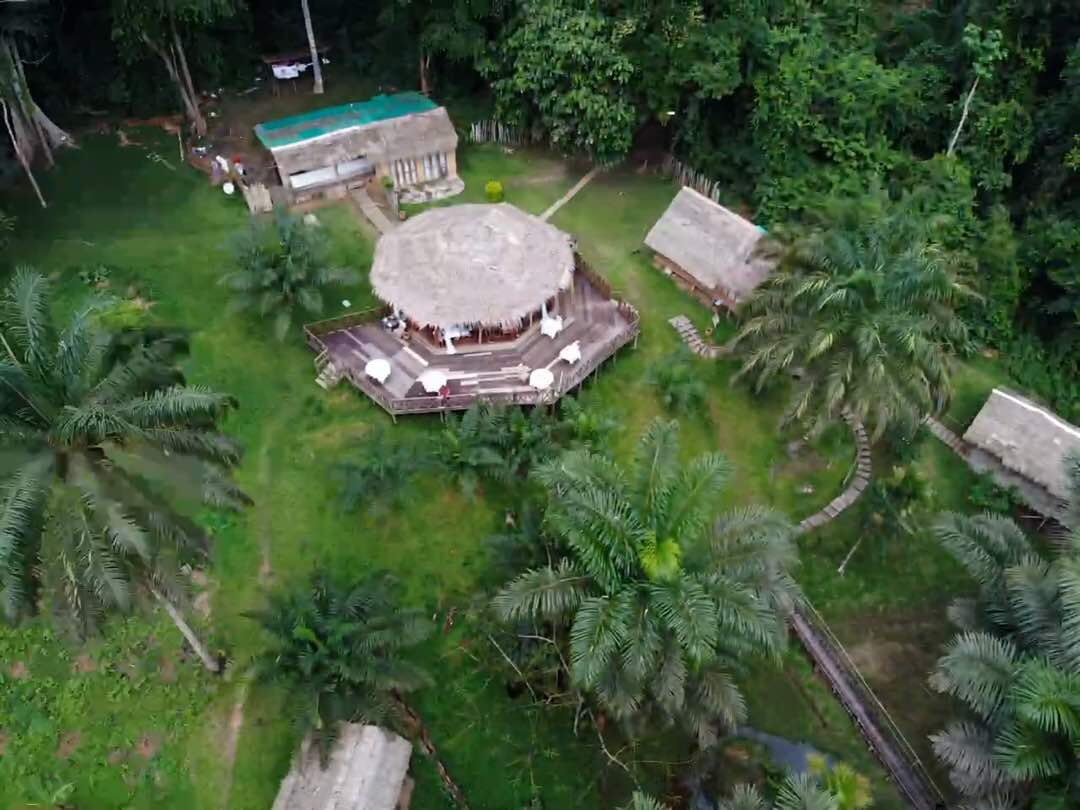
View of a beautiful forest Lodge in Oveng

==== O ====
Commune	Département	Province
Obala	Lékié	Centre
Okola	Lékié	Centre
Olamze	Vallée du Ntem	Sud
Olanguina	Méfou-et-Afamba	Centre
Ombessa	Mbam-et-Inoubou	Centre
Ouli	Kadey	Est
Oveng	Dja et Lobo	Sud

==== P ====
Commune	Département	Province
Penja	Mungo	Littoral
Penka-Michel	Menoua	Ouest
Petté	Diamaré	Extrême-Nord
Pitoa	Bénoué	Nord
Poli	Faro	Nord
Pouma	Sanaga-maritime	Littoral

==== R ====
Commune	Département	Province
Roua	Mayo-Tsanaga	Extrême-Nord

==== S ====
Commune	Département	Province
Sa'a	Lékié	Centre
Salapoumbé	Boumba-et-Ngoko	Est
Sangmélima	Dja et Lobo	Sud
Santa	Mezam	Nord-Ouest
Santchou	Menoua	Ouest
Soa	Méfou-et-Afamba	Centre
Somalomo	Haut-Nyong	Est

==== T ====
Commune	Département	Province
Tchati-Bali	Mayo-Danay	Extrême-Nord
Tcholliré	Mayo-Rey	Nord
Tibati	Djerem	Adamaoua
Tignère	Faro-et-Déo	Adamaoua
Tiko	Fako	Sud-Ouest
Tinto	Manyu	Sud-Ouest
Toko	Ndian	Sud-Ouest
Tokombéré	Mayo-sava	Extrême-Nord
Tombel	Koupé et Manengouba	Sud-Ouest
Tonga	Ndé	Ouest
Touboro	Mayo-Rey	Nord
Touloum	Mayo-kani	Extrême-Nord
Touroua	Bénoué	Nord
Tubah	Mezam	Nord-Ouest

==== W ====
Commune	Département	Province
Wabane	Lebialem	Sud-Ouest
Wasa	Logone-et-Chari	Extrême-Nord
Widikum-Boffe	Momo	Nord-Ouest
Wina	Mayo-Danay	Extrême-Nord
Wum	Menchum	Nord-Ouest

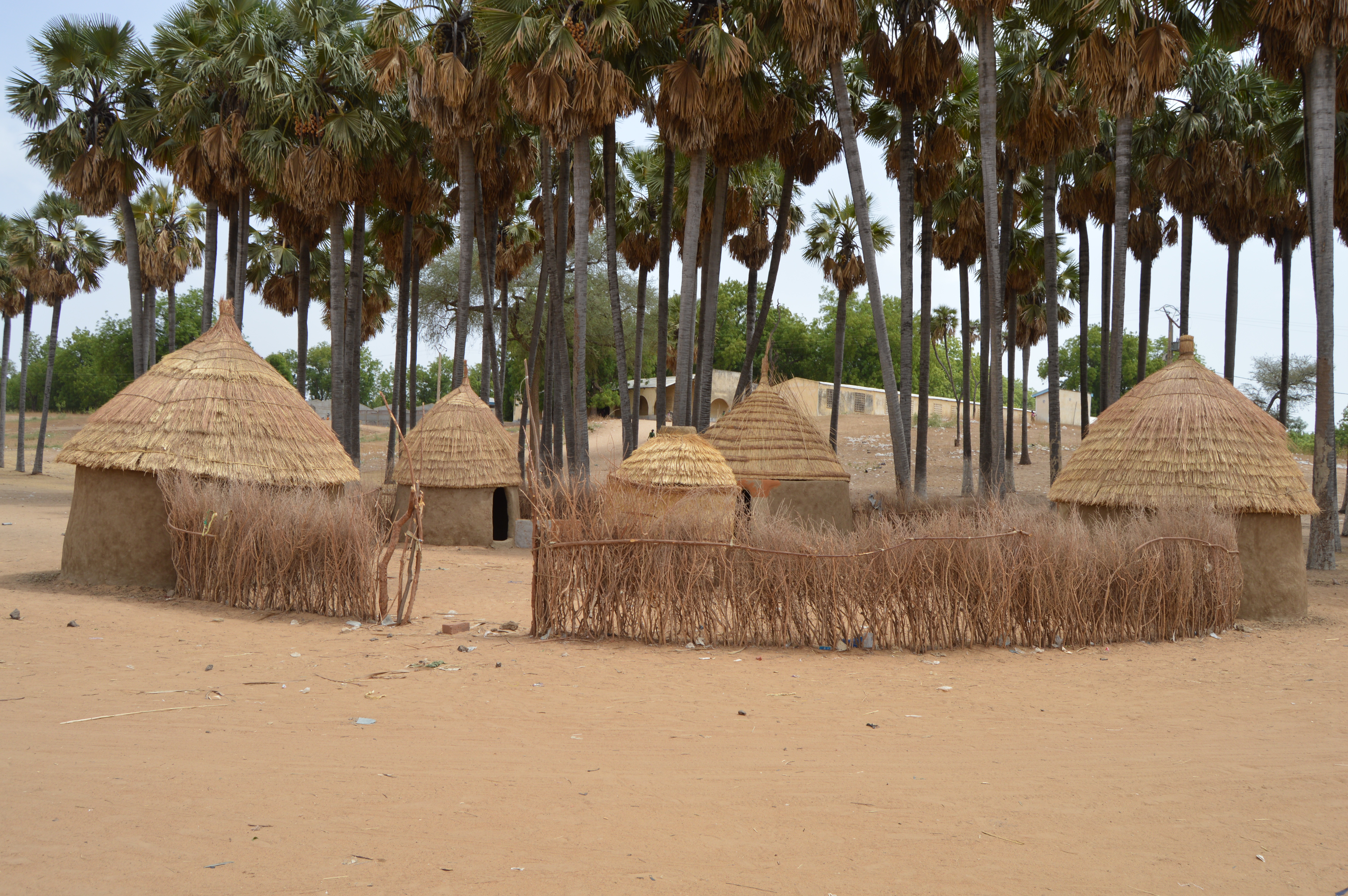
Village settlement structure, Yagoua

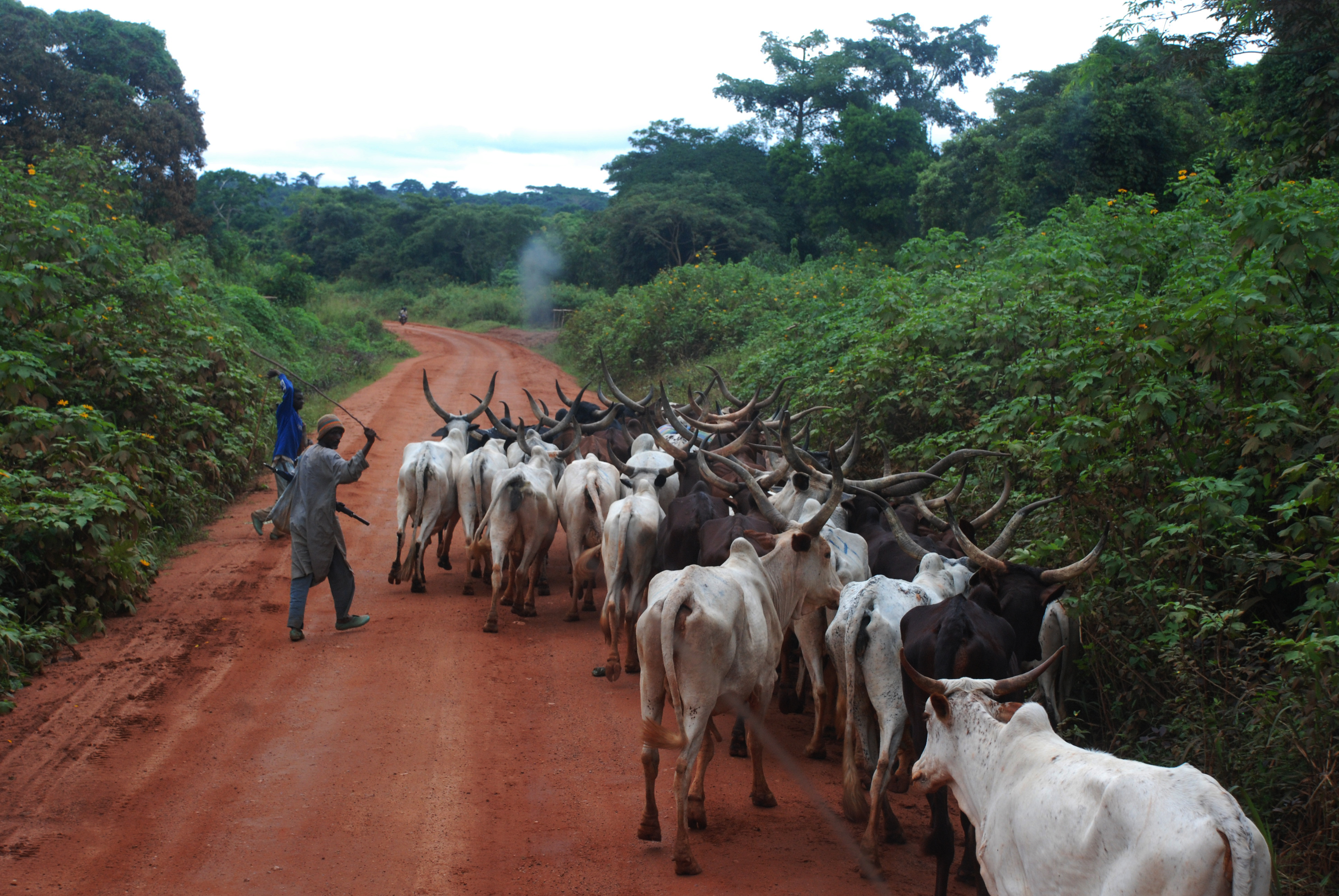
Cattle herd in Yokadouma

==== Y ====
Commune	Département	Province
Yabassi	Nkam	Littoral
Yagoua	Mayo-Danay	Extrême-Nord
Yaoundé	Mfoundi	Centre
Yingui	Nkam	Littoral
Yokadouma	Boumba-et-Ngoko	Est
Yoko	Mbam-et-Kim	Centre

==== Z ====
Commune	Département	Province
Zhoa	Menchum	Nord-Ouest
Zina	Logone-et-Chari	Extrême-Nord
Zoétélé	Dja-et-Lobo	Sud

== Sources ==
- Site de la primature - Élections municipales 2002
- Contrôle de gestion et performance des services publics communaux des villes camerounaises - Thèse de Donation Avele - Université Montesquieu Bordeaux IV
- Charles Nanga, La réforme de l’administration territoriale au Cameroun à la lumière de la loi constitutionnelle n° 96/06 du 18 janvier 1996, Mémoire ENA. "Internet archive version since original link not working July 2017"
- Décret n°2007/117 du 24 avril 2007.
