= Lindoï =

- Location within Cameroon
- Coordinates: 3°45′N 11°06′E
- Country: Cameroon
- Region: Centre
- Department: Nyong-et-Kellé
- Commune: Bondjock

Government
  - Mayor: André Libam

Population (2005)
  - Total: 1,973

Lindoï (French: [lindɔi]) is a village in the Centre Region of Cameroon, located in the Bondjock commune of the Nyong-et-Kéllé department.

== History ==
When Lindoï was created in 1941, the village was named "Mambine" which means "fruit-bearing tree" in Bassa by General Reli, who oversaw the region during the colonial era. After administrative cutbacks and during the decentralization process, Mambine was formed from its territories in Bondjock and Matomb and placed under the jurisdiction of Bondjock. From 1941 until 2009, the village has had four leaders from one ruling family. In 2009, the mayor was André Libam.

== Population and Society ==
Lindoï was recorded as having 1,973 inhabitants in the 2005 census, and its majority ethnic group is Bassa. Young people comprise 85% of the population. The village has one comprehensive public school, a general private secondary school, and a public secondary school. Despite these educational facilities, their gross enrolment ratio remains low. Lindoï has one Catholic and one Presbyterian parish, and several Christian Revival churches. Homes are built out of adobe, dry bamboo and baked mud bricks. Several borehole wells provide the town with water.
