= Nyong-et-Kéllé =

- Department
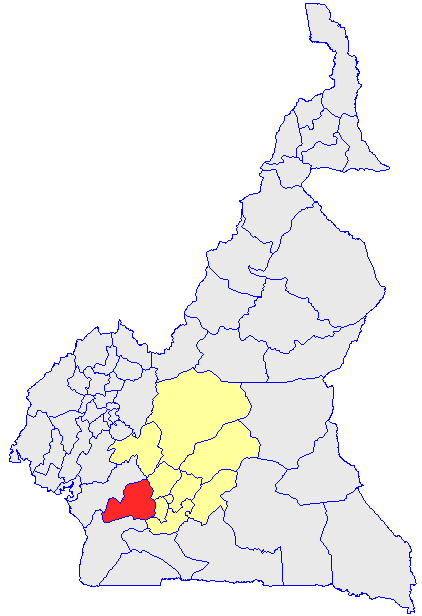
- Department location in Cameroon

- Location within Cameroon Location within Africa
- Country: Cameroon
- Province: Centre Province
- Capital: Éséka

Area
  - Total: 2,456 sq mi (6,362 km^{2})

Population (2001)
  - Total: 145,181
- Time zone: UTC+1 (WAT)

Nyong-et-Kéllé is a department of Centre Province in Cameroon. The department covers an area of 6,362 km^{2} and as of 2001 had a total population of 145,181. The capital of the department lies at Éséka.

== Subdivisions ==
The department is divided administratively into 10 communes and in turn into villages.

=== Communes ===
- Biyouha
- Bondjock
- Bot-Makak
- Dibang
- Eséka
- Makak
- Matomb
- Messondo
- Ngog-Mapubi
- Ngui-Bassal
