= Philippe Mpay =

Cameroonian general (1939–2026)

- Born: 1939; Nguibassal, Nyong-et-Kéllé, French Cameroon
- Died: 9 May 2026 (aged 86–87) Yaoundé, Cameroon
- Allegiance: Cameroon
- Branch: Cameroonian Armed Forces
- Service years: 1960–2000s
- Rank: Major general
- Commands: 2nd Military Region; 3rd Military Region; 5th Military Region; 6th Military Region; Operational Command of Douala; Combined Arms Military Schools and Training Centres
- Education: École spéciale militaire de Saint-Cyr; École supérieure de guerre

Philippe Mpay (1939 – 9 May 2026) was a Cameroonian army officer who served in the Cameroonian Armed Forces and rose to the rank of major general. His service included various operational, administrative, and training commands, such as leading military regions, the Operational Command of Douala, and the Combined Arms Military Schools and Training Centres.

== Early life and education ==
Philippe Mpay was born in 1939 in Nguibassal, in the Nyong-et-Kéllé department of French Cameroon.

He completed his primary education in Libamba and Makak, before attending secondary school at Lycée Joss in Douala and Lycée Général-Leclerc in Yaoundé. In 1960, he obtained a baccalaureate in philosophy in Brazzaville, in the Republic of the Congo.

== Military training ==
Mpay enlisted in the Cameroonian Armed Forces on 19 October 1960, shortly after the independence of Cameroon. He subsequently received military training in France, including at the École spéciale militaire de Saint-Cyr, the Infantry Application School at Saint-Maixent-l'École, an officers' school in Montpellier, and the École supérieure de guerre in Paris, from which he graduated in the 1975 class.

== Military career ==
=== Early commands ===
After returning to Cameroon, Mpay held several command and staff positions in the army. In 1981, he was appointed commander of the 3rd Military Sector in Bafoussam. He later became commander of military schools and training centres, before taking command of the 3rd Military Region in 1985.

=== Ministry of Defence roles ===
On 21 October 1988, Mpay was appointed Director of Equipment at the Armed Forces General Staff. In 1990, he became Director of Military Equipment at the Ministry of Defence.

On 5 February 1993, he was promoted to brigadier general. On 26 February 1993, he assumed command of the 5th Military Region in Ngaoundéré.

=== Regional and operational commands ===
In 1998, Mpay was appointed commander of the 2nd Military Region. Between April and September 2001, he also commanded the 6th Military Region, based in Bamenda.

On 20 February 2000, he was appointed head of the Operational Command of Douala, a special military structure created to combat urban crime in Cameroon.

On 25 September 2001, he was promoted to major general.

=== Military education and training ===
Mpay later served as commander of the Combined Arms Military Schools and Training Centres, a structure responsible for military training institutions within the Cameroonian Armed Forces.

In June 2021, he presided over the graduation ceremony of the 2019 cohort of the Non-Commissioned Officers Training Centre in Koutaba.

In October 2021, he presided over a colours presentation ceremony for new commandos of the Rapid Intervention Battalion in Limbé.

He also took part in official ceremonies of the École militaire interarmées and the International Higher War School.

=== Judicial functions ===
In May 2018, Mpay was appointed alternate assessor to the military chambers of Cameroon's courts of appeal by presidential decree.

== Death ==
Mpay died in Yaoundé on 9 May 2026.
