= Agriculture in Cameroon =

Agriculture in Cameroon is an important part of the Economy of Cameroon. It is one of the largest producers of Taro, cocoa bean, Palm oil and Cooking banana in the world. Approximately 70% of the workers in the country are involved in agriculture, and over 80% of the economically important industries are connected.

== Production ==
In 2018, Cameroon produced:

- 5 million tons of cassava (13th largest producer in the world);
- 3.9 million tonnes of plantain (3rd largest producer in the world, only behind Congo and Ghana);
- 2.6 million tons of palm oil (7th largest producer in the world);
- 2.3 million tons of maize;
- 1.9 million tons of taro (3rd largest producer in the world, second only to Nigeria and China);
- 1.4 million tons of sorghum;
- 1.2 million tons of banana;
- 1.2 million tons of sugarcane;
- 1 million tons of tomato (19th largest producer in the world);
- 674 thousand tonnes of yam (7th largest producer in the world);
- 594 thousand tons of peanut;
- 410 thousand tons of sweet potato;
- 402 thousand tons of beans;
- 332 thousand tons of rice;
- 310 thousand tons of pineapple;
- 307 thousand tons of cocoa (5th largest producer in the world, losing to Ivory Coast, Ghana, Indonesia and Nigeria);
- 302 thousand tons of potato;
- 301 thousand tons of onion;
- 249 thousand tons of cotton;

In addition to smaller productions of other agricultural products, such as coffee (33 thousand tons) and natural rubber (55 thousand tons).

== Crops ==
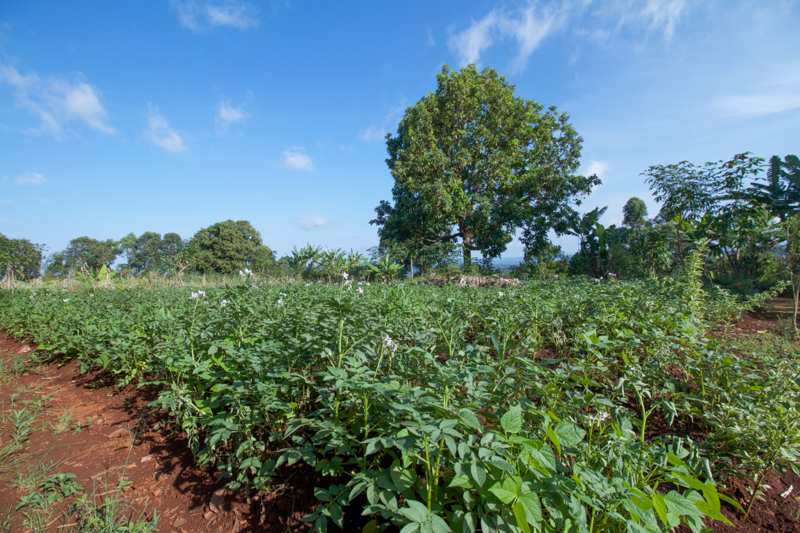
Potato field in Bamboutos

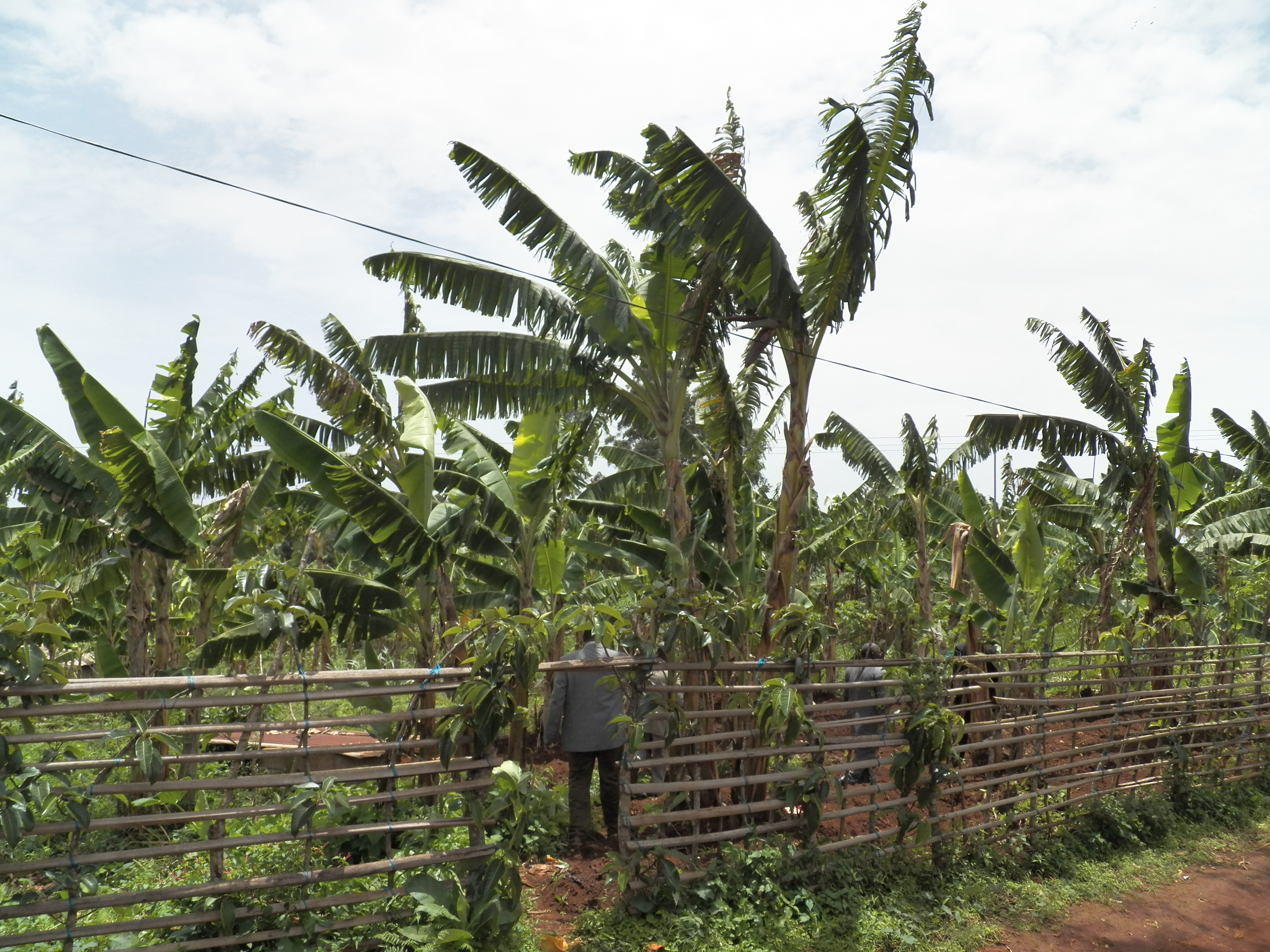
Cooking bananas near Bandjoun

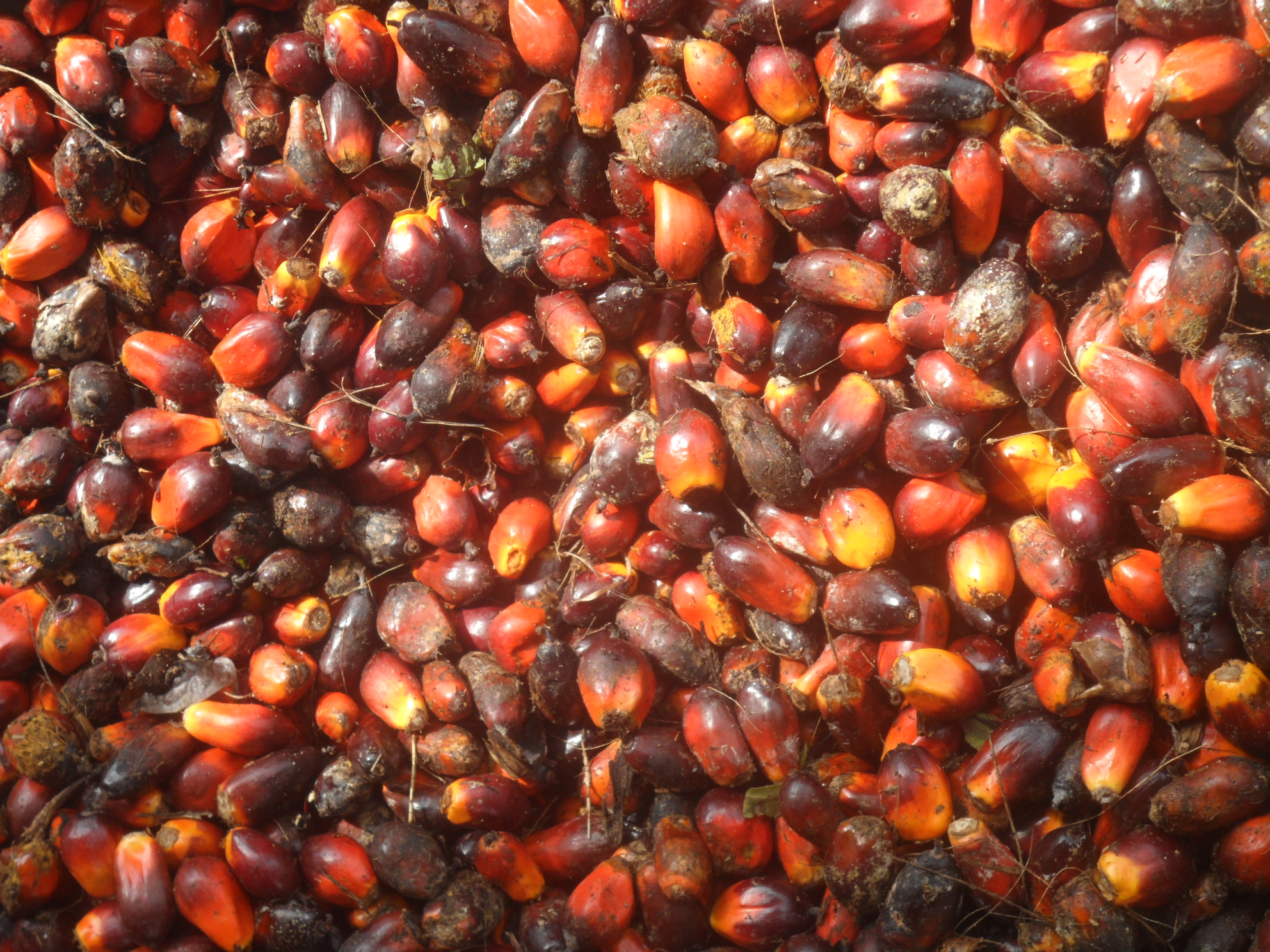
Palm kernels in Tayap

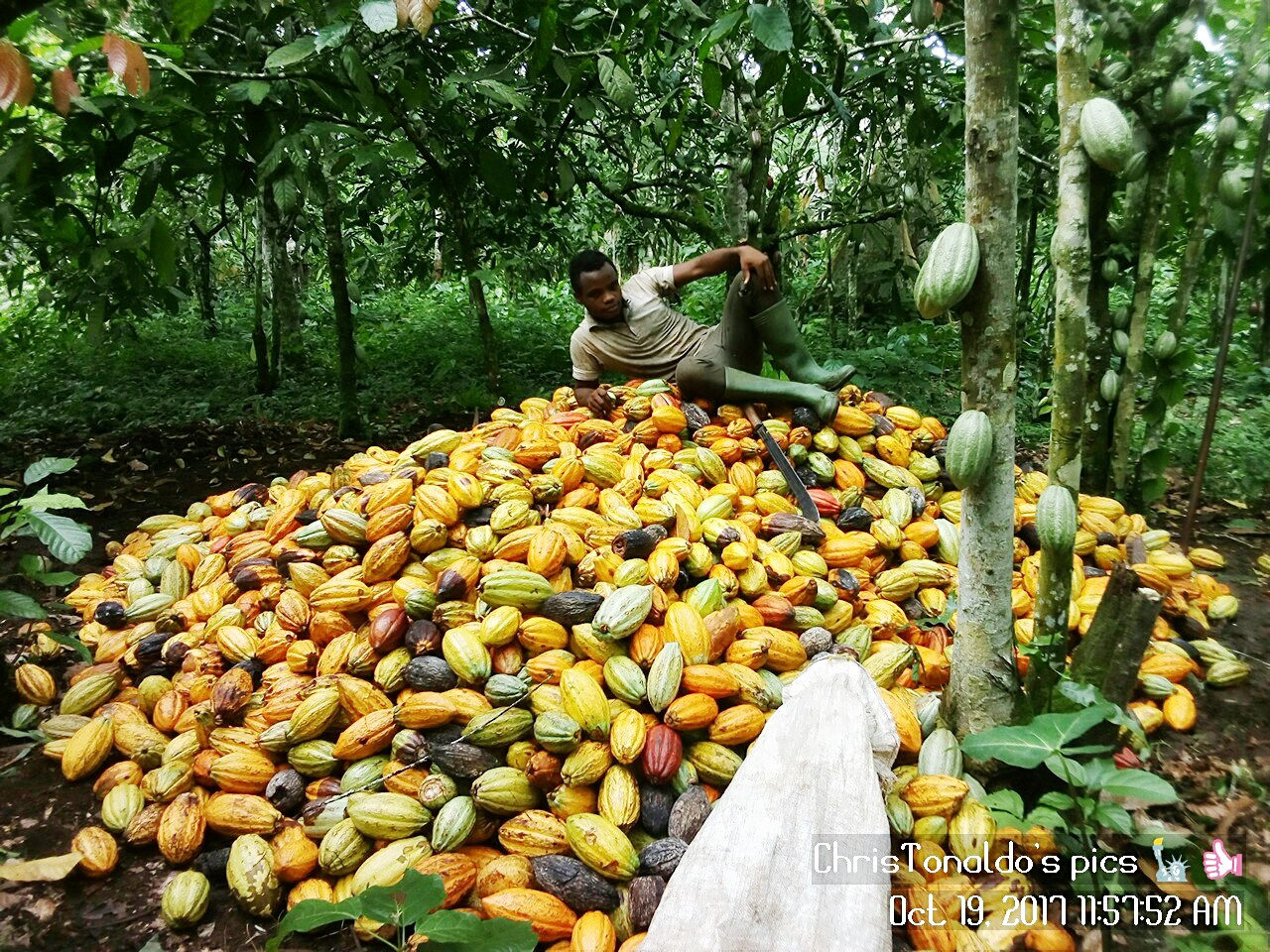
Cocoa Farm

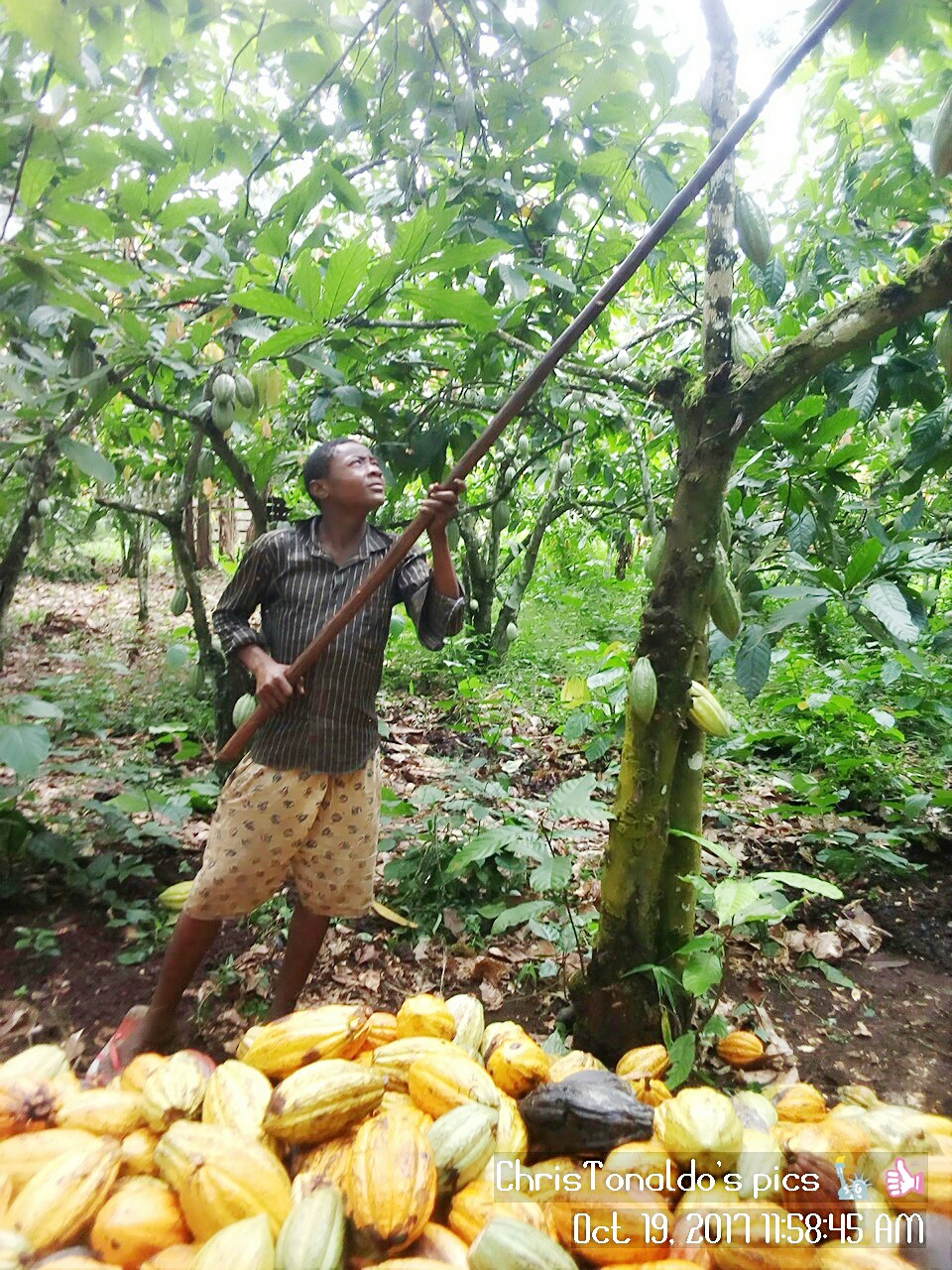
Mr. Ateh Eldeno harvesting cocoa in his farm

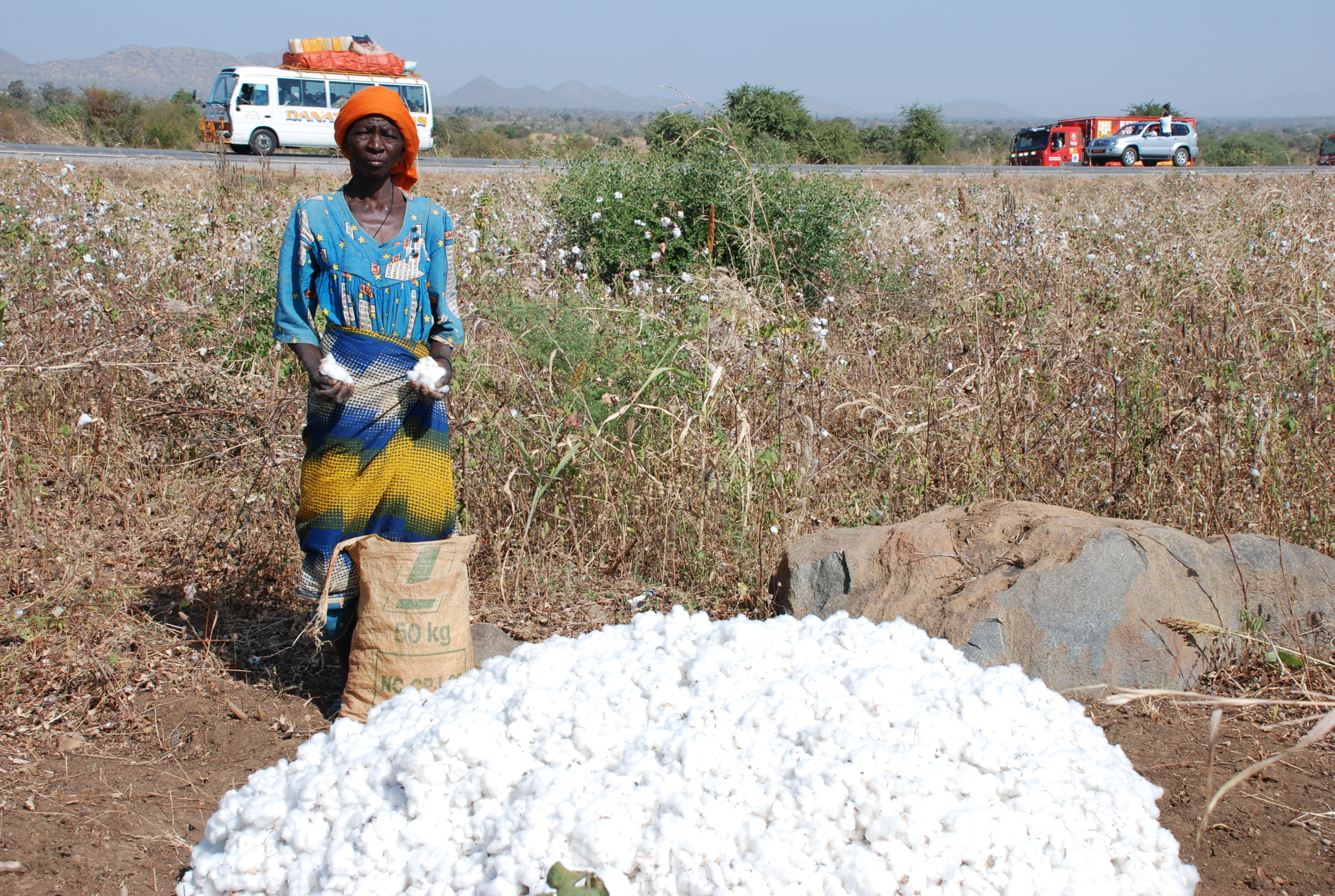
Cotton harvesting

According to a document jointly published in 2007 by the Ministry of Agriculture and Rural Development (MINADER), and that of Fishery, Livestock and Animal Husbandry (MINEPIA); in recent years, food production did not follow the rapid demographic increase, especially in the urban areas. According to these ministries, food security has to be assured by an increase in the production of food stuff and other crops which could substitute importations. To meet these needs, these ministries have as an objective for a sector's development strategy, set a target in 2015 to train 30.000 farmers per year. MINADER has 35 centres for agricultural training (24 are rural training centres and 11 are centres for the training of young farmers). Furthermore, these two ministries are actually offering training in the rural development sector like extension agents, agricultural advisers and professional farmer groupings (farmers’ organisations).

The Government, faced with the effects of the financial crisis, has taken steps to boost production of commodities such as corn, rice, cassava, potato, oil palm and plantain. For food crops, these measures aim to improve commercialisation products through the construction of warehouses for conservation. In 2009, the agricultural sector accounted for approximately 75.6% of primary industry with 68.8% for food and agriculture 6.8% for export crops. This sub-sector increased by 8.3% compared to 2008, contributing 0.7 percentage point to growth actual primary sector. (Institut National de la Statistique – Annuaire Statistique du Cameroun 2010) In 2009, the government through the Ministry of Agriculture and Rural Development intends to implement an emergency plan to increase agricultural production. This plan aims to provide farmers planting material; subsidize pesticides and fertilizer from 20 to 50%, grant loans at low interest rates, create five pools of agricultural machinery support up to 15%, acquire about a hundred tractors and increase the capacity of processing, storage and packaging. All this will lead to improved agricultural production. The National Agricultural Extension and Agricultural Research (PNVRA) through outreach activities conducted by Extension Agents Zone (AVZ) provide technical guidance and sometimes financial farmers. (Institut National de la Statistique – Annuaire Statistique du Cameroun 2010)

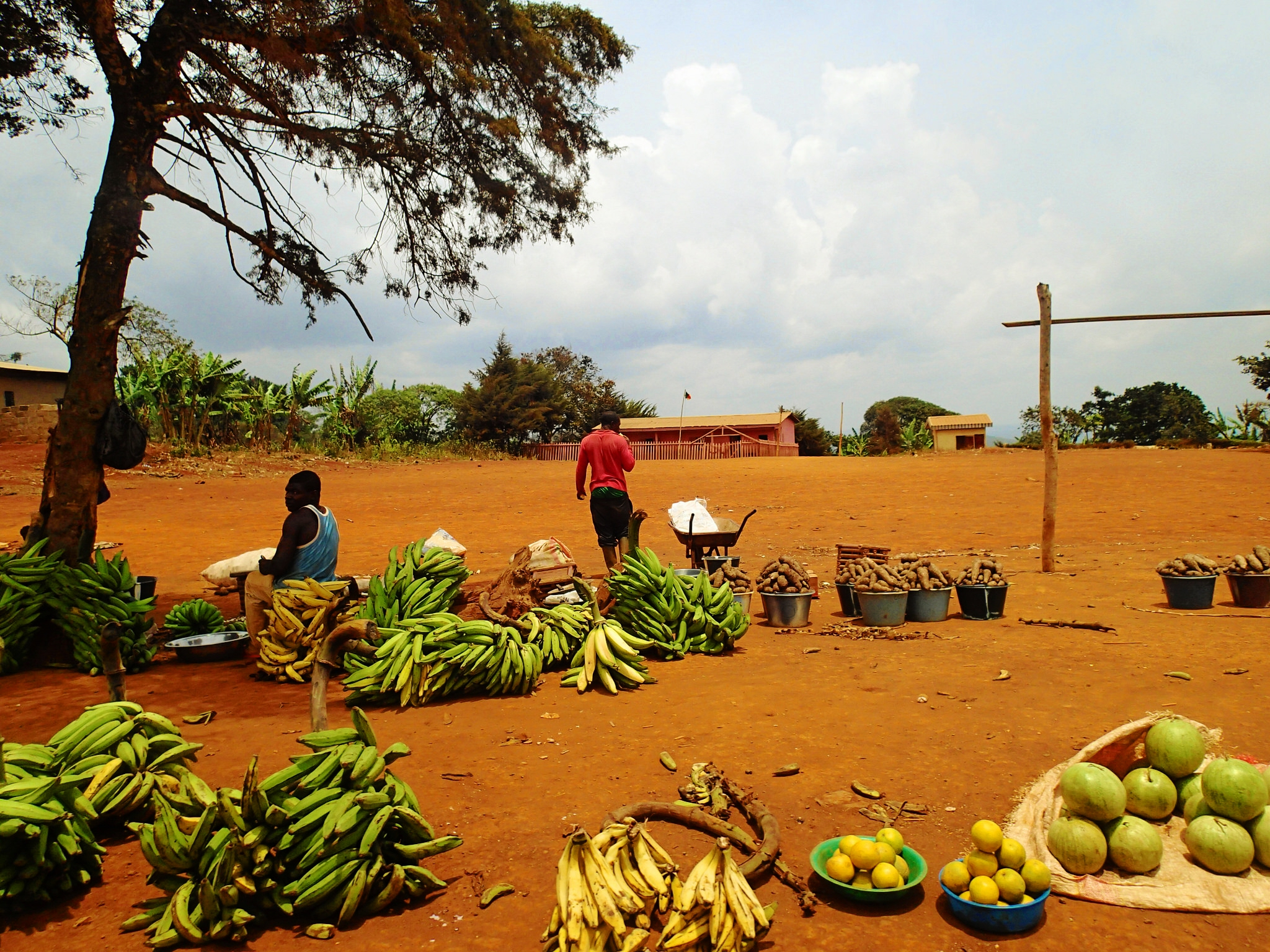
Market stall selling yams and plantains in the West Region of Cameroon, 2014.

In March 2012, “Cameroun Tribune” published an article on the eve of the launching of the 2012 farming season in Cameroon, stating that apart from some few mechanised industrial exploitations, agriculture in Cameroon is essentially traditional. With subsistence agriculture, manual work is usually very arduous, the cultivated surface area is also reduced, and yields are low and therefore insufficient to meet both domestic and external demand for food. This article reveals that Cameroon is forced to import large quantities of cereals (rice, maize) to fill the gap in production, feed its population and meet the demands of the brewing industries. That is why during the agro pastoral show in Ebolowa, President Paul Biya stressed the need to modernised Cameroon's agriculture, so as to increase the productivity of small farmers and encourage the emergence of “second generation” production units; that is to say large and medium size companies. In this perspective, the mechanisation of agriculture must be a fact, given the multiplier effect of machines in the chain of production.

=== Coffee ===
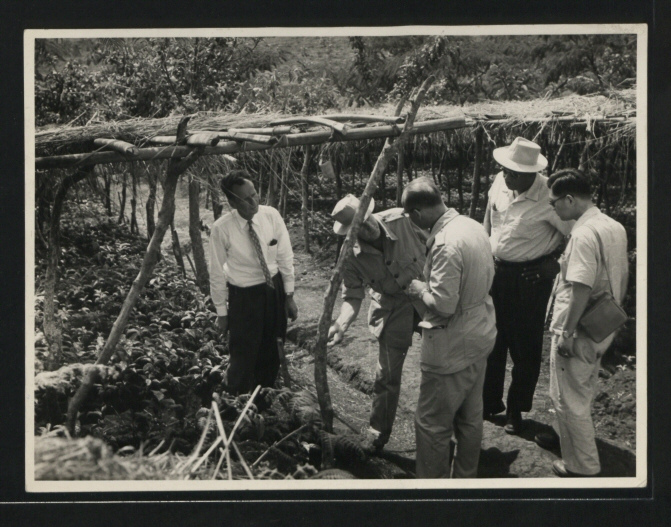
Santa Coffee Estate in Bamenda

Coffee production is important to the economy of Cameroon. The crop is grown extensively in the country, with robusta more prevalent in the coastal areas and arabica more widespread in the western highlands. The two varieties of arabica cultivated are Java and Jamaïca of which only Java is resistant to pests such as coffee berry disease and rust. In 2014, Cameroon was ranked the 31st largest producer of coffee in world.

== See also ==
- Economy of Cameroon
- Union Centrale des Coopératives Agricoles de l'Ouest (UCCAO)
- mountains
