= Dibang (disambiguation) =

Dibang may refer to the following places and people:

- Dibang, an Indian journalist
- Dibang River, India
- Dibang Valley district in India
- Dibang, Cameroon, a commune in Cameroon
