= Tayap =

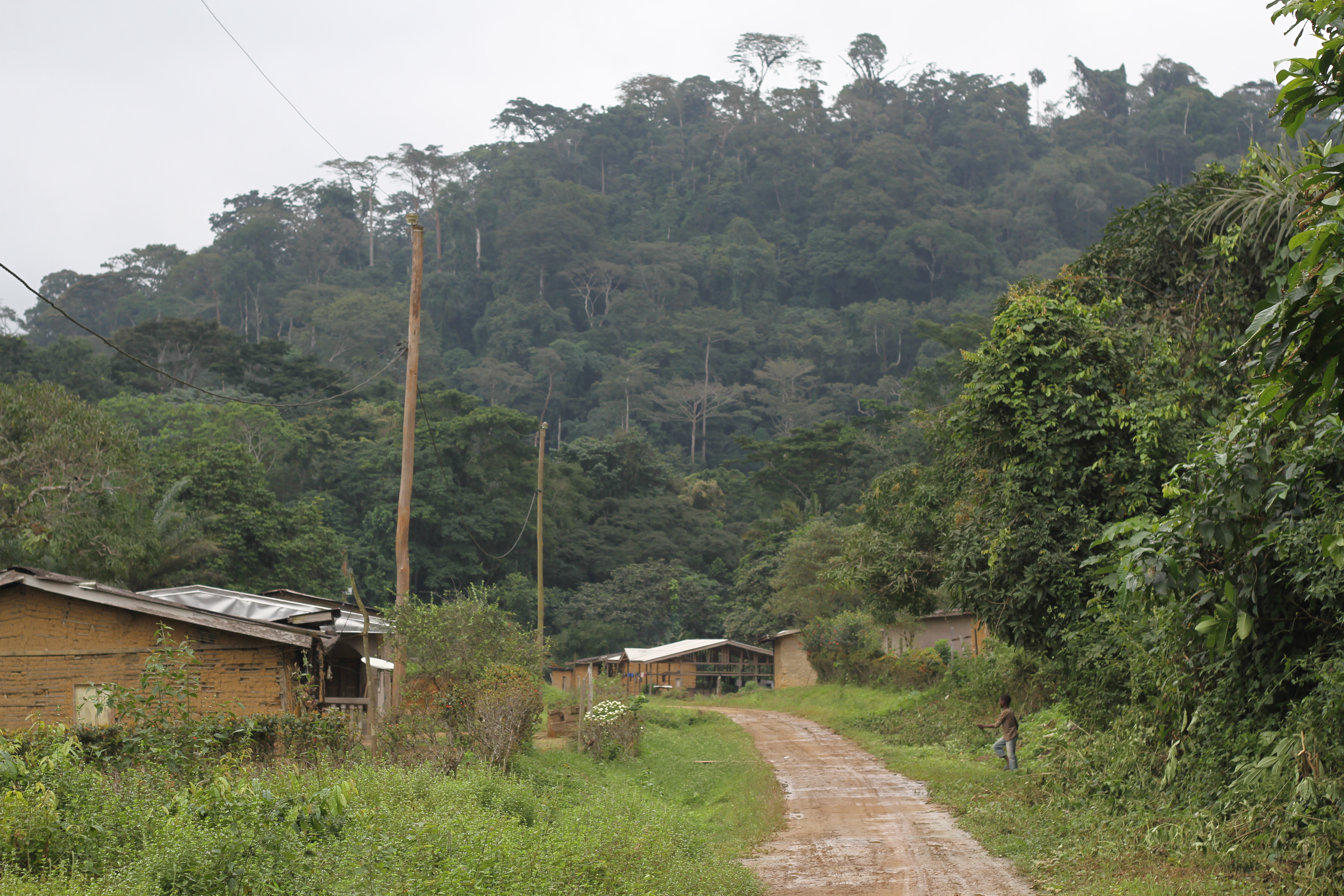
- Tayap

- Location in Cameroon
- Coordinates: 3.817241°N 10.901418°E
- Country: Cameroon
- Region: Centre Region
- Department: Nyong-et-Kéllé
- Elevation: 350 m (1,150 ft)

Population (2010)
  - Total: 254 (census)

Tayap is a small village of Cameroon located in the Centre Region, between the country's capital Yaounde (86 km) and Douala (164 km). The village of Tayap is part of the Ngog-Mapubi district of the Nyong-et-Kéllé department.

Situated in the north-western zone of the forest of the Congo Basin, the world's second-largest rain forest after the Amazon, the village of Tayap has suffered from deforestation in Cameroon caused by different factors like the increase in population growth, the development of logging, the collection of firewood and the practice of slash-and-burn.

Since 2011, Tayap has been the site of a pilot project of agroecology and ecotourism aiming to protect its biodiversity and lands and to develop activities which generate income for its residents.

== Geography ==
=== Location ===
The village of Tayap is located at 3°49°2.067’’N and 10°54'5.106’’E. Tayap borders the villages of Omog and Mamb to the North, Mamb Kelle and Song Mpeck to the West, Lamal Pougue to the East and Nlep be and Ngong to the South.

Tayap is situated 86 km from Yaounde (12 km from Boumnyebel on motorway N3 Douala-Yaounde) and extends along a bush road a dozen kilometers long joining the main Douala-Yaounde road. Tayap is connected to the N3 Douala-Yaounde motorway by a path which is not regularly maintained, which makes travel difficult in the rainy season. The village of Tayap is situated 6 kilometers from Omog.

=== Climate ===
Tayap enjoys a humid climate of the equatorial type in four seasons: two dry seasons and two wet seasons. The main wet season takes place between August and October, and the minor wet season from March to May. The main dry season is from November to February and the minor dry season in June and July. The nearest meteorological station is at Eseka about 20 km to the South-West of Tayap. The mean annual temperature is 25C. Rainfall varies between 1,500 and 2,500 mm a year.

=== Geology and speleology ===
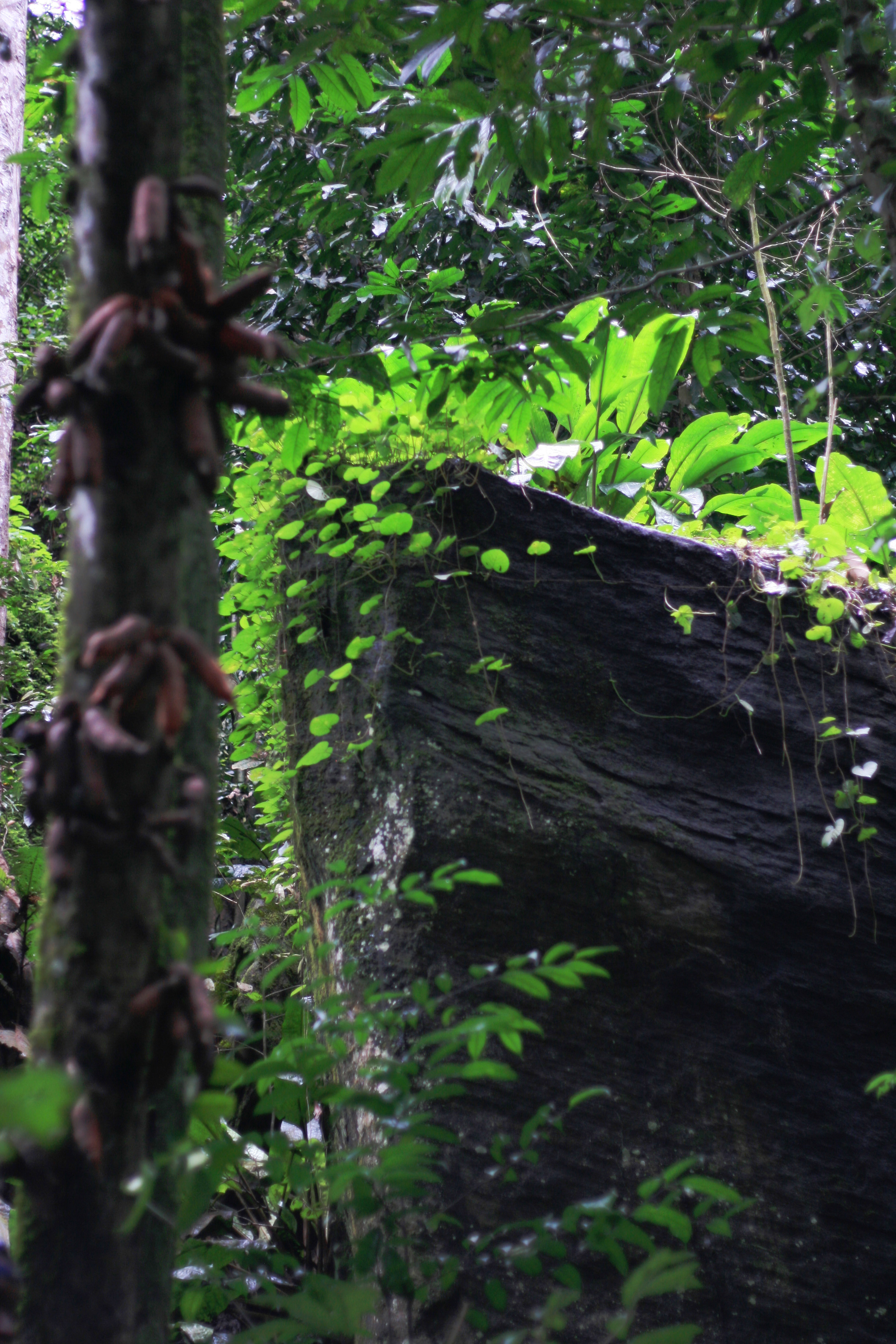
Rock formation

The village of Tayap is characterized by a mean altitude of about 350 meters and by hills with steep slopes. It demonstrates an undersoil rich in silicate rock (quartzite) and magnetic rocks like pyrites and micaschist.

Tayap is rich in speleological sites. On its hill, which is more than 544 meters high, are to be found grottos or rocks which have been physically deformed to create a series of displaced scales. One of the grottos contains nests of bald rockfowl, a bird threatened with extinction. One of the rocks, of triangular shape, forms a genuine shelter at a height of more than 100 meters and acted as a refuge for Cameroonian nationalists during the Cameroon's struggle for independence.

=== Environment ===
Tayap is situated in the Northern zone of the forest of the Congo Basin. Vegetation is essentially woodland. Two types of forests coexist: the primary forest met at the peaks of the hills and the secondary forest which results from the destruction of primary forests for agriculture or forestry. The forest of the Congo Basin suffers damage from deforestation in very specific areas This deforestation is explained first of all by the important development of forestry, an economic alternative which the Cameroon has found to compensate for falling prices of cocoa and coffee, its main resources in 1990, but also by the practice of cultivation on burned ground which goes on in intertropical forest zones. The annual rate of deforestation in Cameroon varies between 0.5 and 1.2 per cent a year. In absolute terms, estimates of annual deforestation vary between 80,000 and 200,000 hectares The village of Tayap still has 1,400 hectares of forest up to 1,200 meters, or about 30% of its area. Essentially, it subsists on the peaks of hills.

== History ==
In the aftermaths of World War II, Cameroon was placed under the protection of France and Britain and obtained, like Togo, the status of associated territory of the French Union. From the 1940s and 1950s onwards, the Union of the Peoples of Cameroon (UPC), a national liberation movement led by Ruben Um Nyobe, played a central role in Cameroon's progress towards independence. In 1955, following violence which caused the deaths of many Cameroonians, the UPC was dissolved and its leaders began resistance. The area around Tayap was one of the bastions of nationalist resistance in the Bassa led by Ruben Um Nyobe. According to the historian of postcolonialism, Achille Mbembe, the village of Ngog included after 1956 fifteen or so of its inhabitants who were engaged in resistance in the bush.

== Administration and politics ==
Tayap is a chieftainate of the third degree in Cameroon, traditional chieftainates are a scale of administrative organization. Chieftainates were micro-states before colonization and can be of first, second or third degree according to their territorial or historic importance. To date, the last chief of the village, Germain Francois Yogo, died on 17 June 2008. Ever since, the village has been without a chief. A transparent election should be organized by the Cameroon government in order to furnish the village with a democratically elected chief. The functioning, management and development of the village are currently led by the Association of inhabitants of the villages of Omog and Tayap (AROTAD).

Two parties coexist in the village: the Union of the Peoples of Cameroon (UPC) and the Cameroon People's Democratic Movement (RDPC). At the time of the last linked legislative and municipal elections which took place in Cameroon on 30 September 2013, the UPC received 32% of the vote compared with 68% for the RDPC.

== Population and society ==
=== Demography ===
Tayap contained 254 inhabitants (57 households) comprising 132 men (52%) and 122 women (48%) at the last census in 2010.10 The population of Tayap represents 2.5% of the population of the commune of Ngog Mapubi. A majority of the population are young and for the most part comprise Bassa people, plus a minority (8%) made up of other Cameroon tribes (Bamenda, Bamileke, Hausa, Beti). It is distributed along the roads and pathways in a multitude of hamlets. The latter are from 0.5 to 2 kilometers from each other. The two main agglomerations are central Tayap and Libolo. The village comprises about sixty houses.

=== Health ===
Tayap does not possess any health establishments. The nearest health centre is at Boumnyebel, 12 km from Tayap. The nearest hospital is at Yaounde (86 km from Tayap).

=== Other basic social services ===
The village of Tayap is provided with drinking water by three pits or sink holes worked by a hand pump with a lever. The water is then taken in buckets or jerrycans to wherever it will be used. The village of Tayap is not electrified despite the presence of a high tension line at the village of Omog. The absence of electricity is an important obstacle to the development of Tayap. The very light winds do not allow a wind-power solution. On the other hand, there is no river with hydroelectric potential close to the village (except at about 8k, accessible only by a bush path).

== Education ==
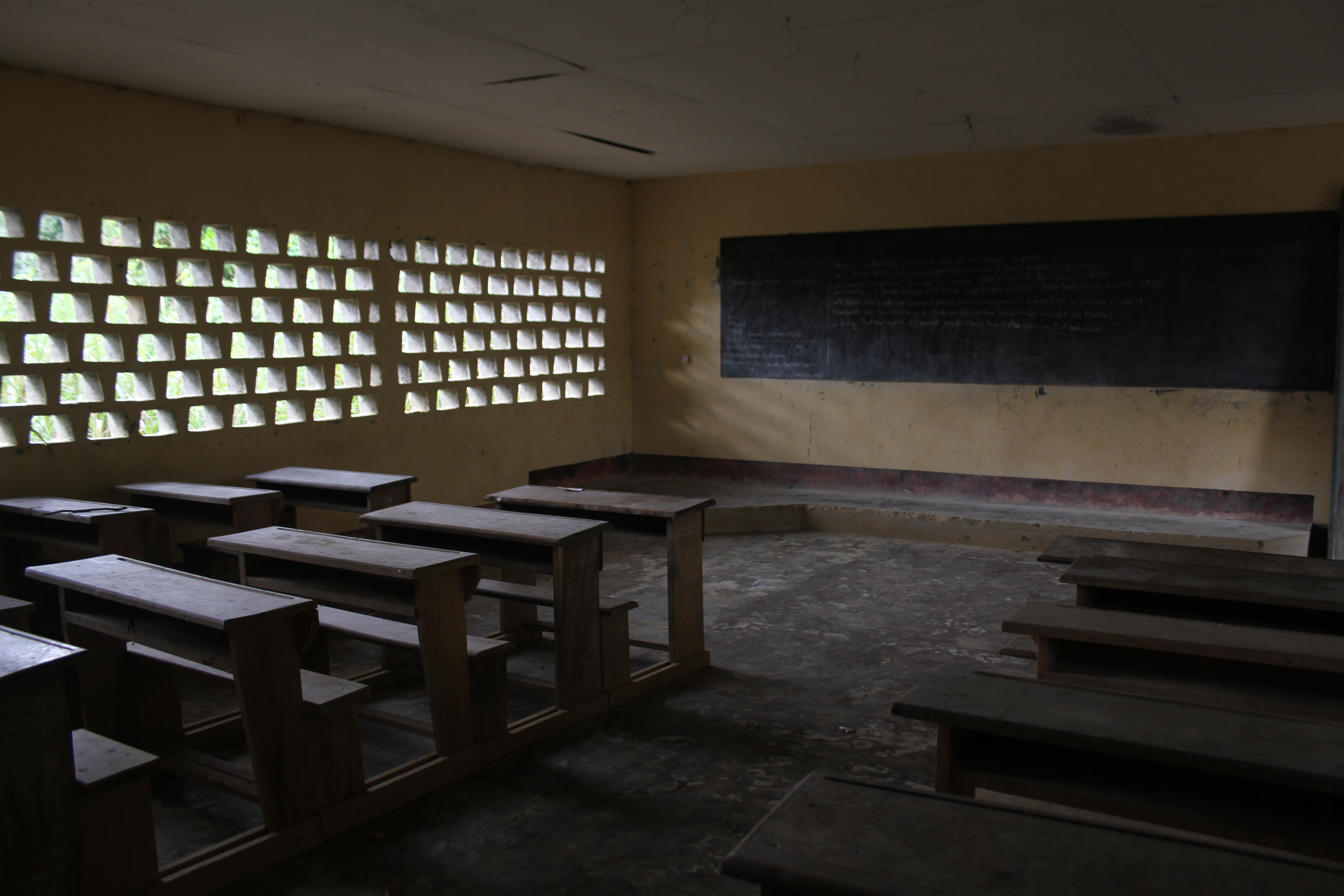
Primary school classroom

In 2003, Tayap was equipped with a primary school constructed by the local population. The school welcomed 34 pupils from the age of six for its first year of operation, and 75 since 2010. The school is mid-way (about 1.5 km) between the hamlets of Libolo and Tayap. In April 2006, the Cameroon government provided two extra classrooms, taking the total number of public school classrooms in Tayap to four. Each class includes two levels, in order to offer all six levels of primary education. After primary school, pupils from the village continue their education in secondary schools (CES) at Lamal-Pougoue or Mamb.

== Religion ==
The population of Tayap is mainly Catholic or Protestant Christian. Two places of worship exist in the village: a Cameroon Presbyterian church and a catholic church.

== Culture ==
The population of Tayap retains four elements of its culture:

- Food, with the legendary dish bongo’o tchobi, a dish of fish accompanied by macabo, plantain, cassava or cassava sticks. The local breakfast based on cassava cake is called mintoumba, with traditional palm wine.
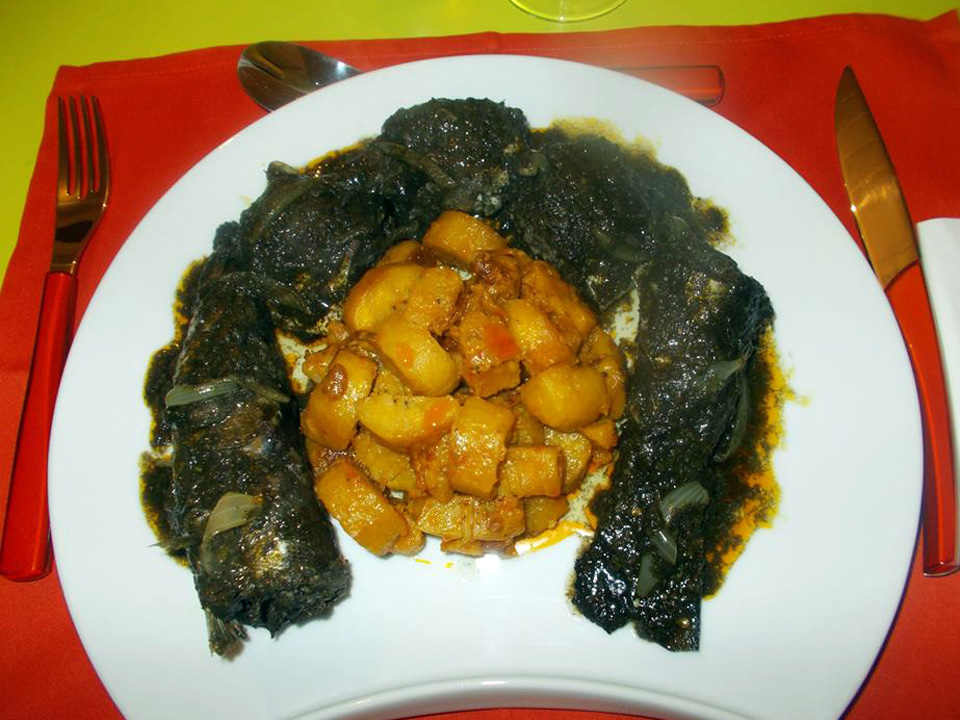
Bongo'o tjobi and banana plantain.

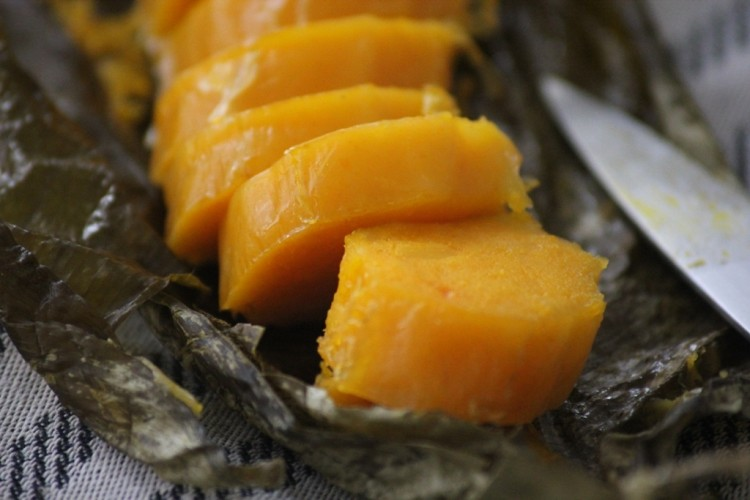
Mintumba.
- The rhythms of the landscape, with Ngola chants and Assiko belly dance.
- Cultural marriage in three stages (li bat Ngond, which means “the proposal of marriage” in basaa language; li ti pos, which means “give the bottle” for the engagement; and bijeck bi lon, which means “food for the family” for the customary marriage.
- Phytotherapy, which uses the plants of the countryside.
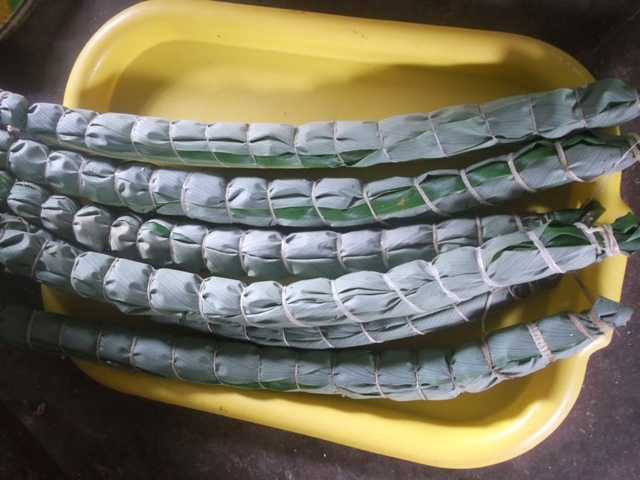
Cassava sticks

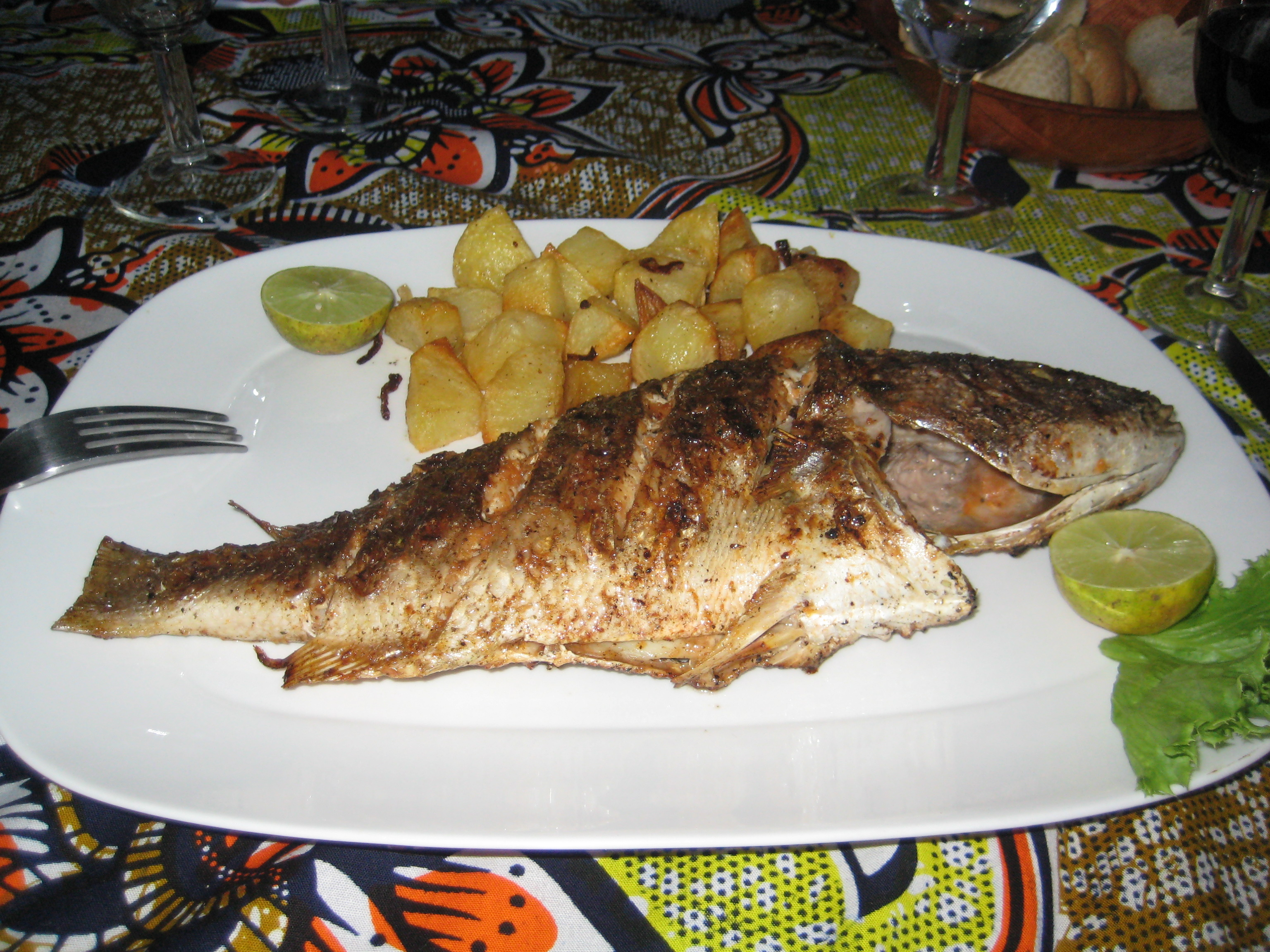
Grilled fish

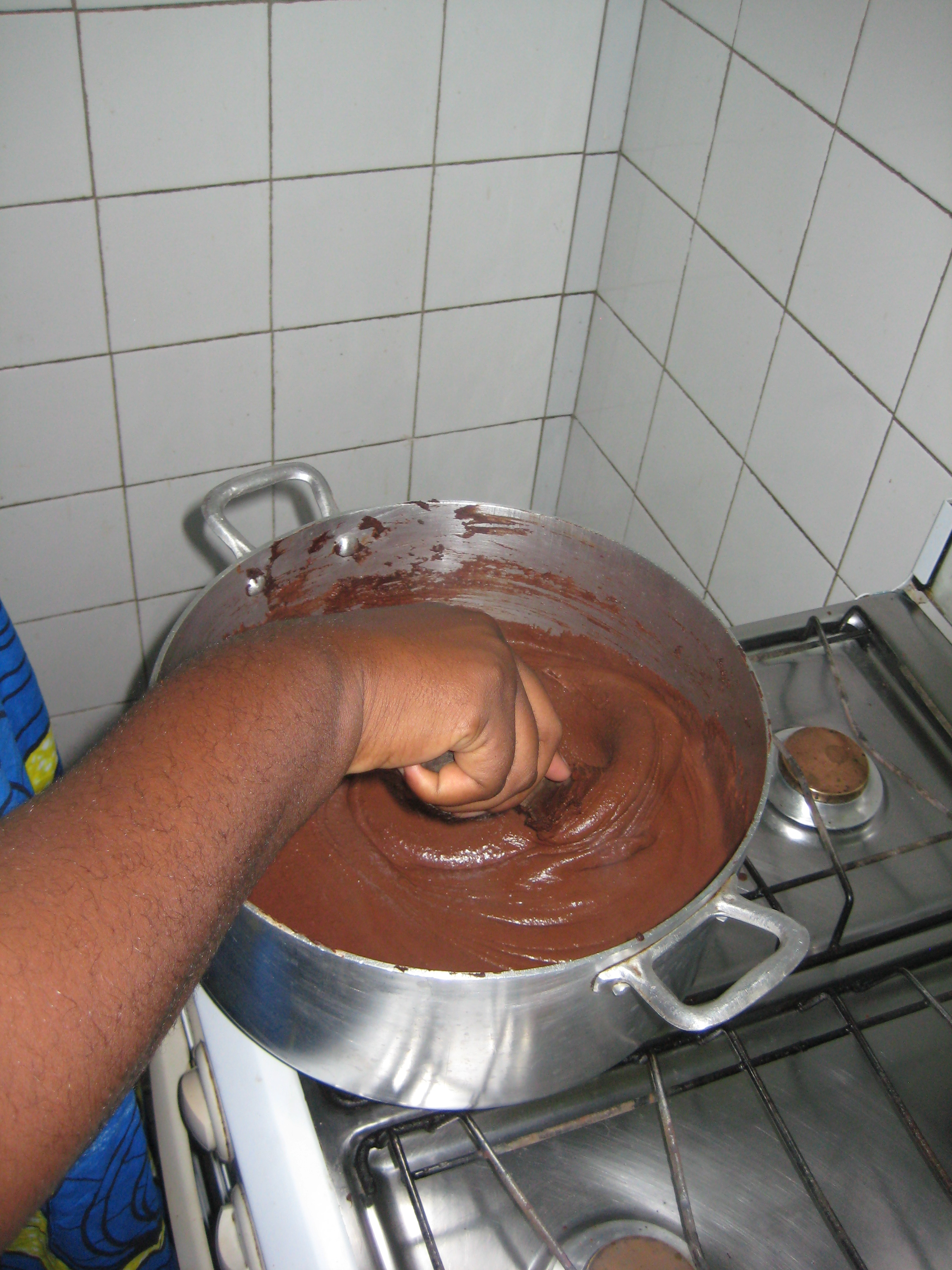
Home-made chocolate

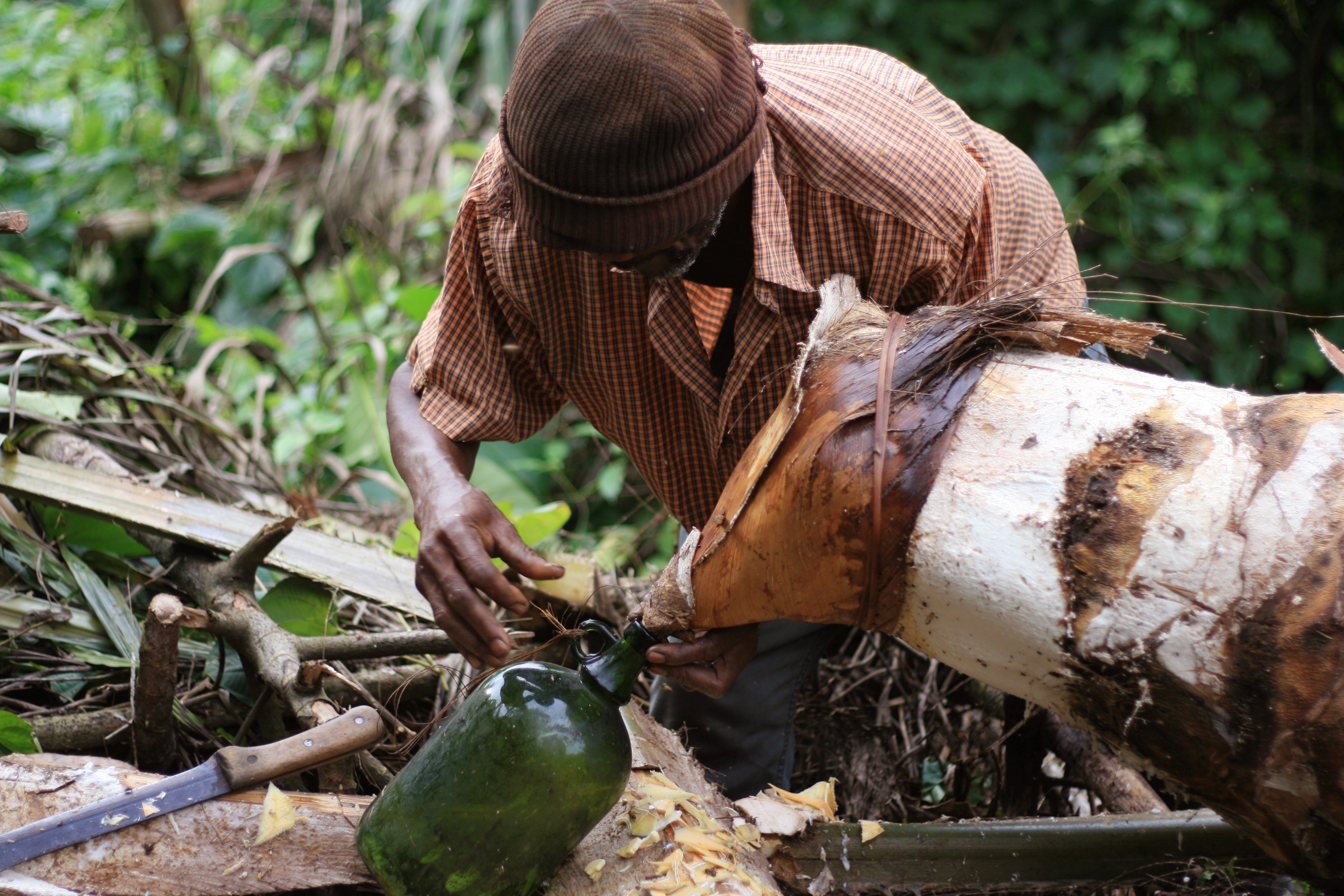
Palm wine

== Economy ==
In 2013, the active population reached 179 persons. Most jobs in the village are based on agriculture.

=== Agriculture ===
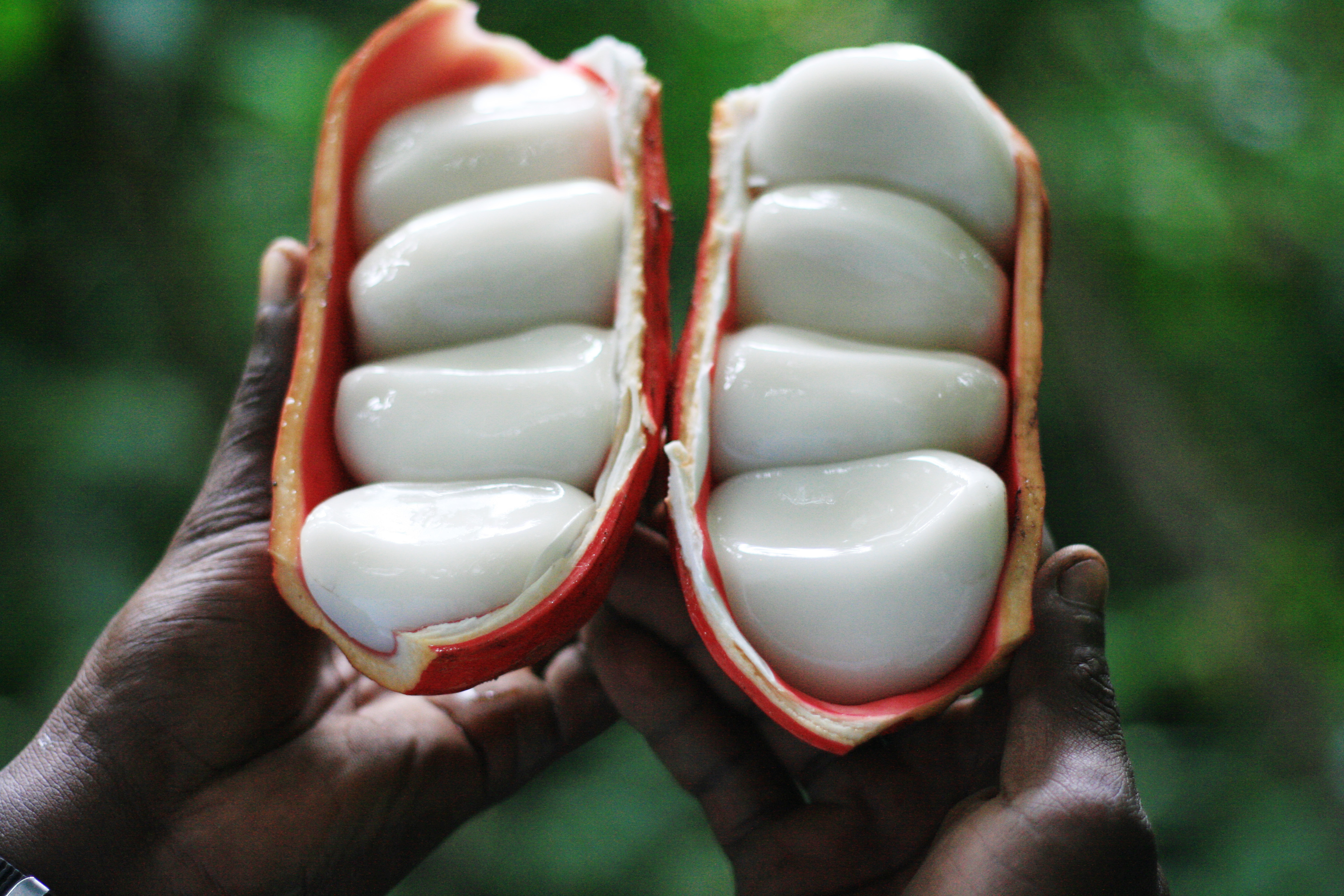
Non-timber forest product : Cola pachycarpa K. Schum. or komngoei in basaa language

Agriculture is the main source of income for the village of Tayap. Trade in non-timber forest products is also carried out. Economic activity concentrates on agriculture with its cultures of investment (cocoa and palm oil), food-production (plantains, cassava, cocoyam, taro, peanuts, bananas) fruit (bush pear, mango, lemon, orange, grapefruit, papaya, kola nuts) and market gardening (pimento, vegetables). These products are traded at Boumnyebel and Yaounde.

=== Other activities ===
The population of Tayap also practices the raising of small animals, fishing and hunting. Tayap has 6 units for pressing palm oil and mutual microfinance. With the construction of two ecolodges and the recognition of existing guest houses, an offer of eco-tourism is in the process of becoming established as an activity which generates extra income for the village. Illegal exploitation of the forest is also a means of subsistence for certain members of the village.

=== Local development initiatives ===
Since 2011, Tayap has been the site of a pilot project to develop agro-ecology and ecotourism as part of the struggle against deforestation, to protect the biodiversity of the village lands and to develop activities which generate income for the inhabitants. This project, called The Ecological Orchards of Tayap, in 2011 received the SEED prize awarded by the SEED initiative (Supporting Entrepreneurs for Environment and Development), a world partnership for sustainable development created in 2002 by UNEP, the UNDP and the IUCN at the world summit on sustainable development in Johannesburg

Between 2014 and 2015, the project allowed th restoration of 110 hectaresof forest, organized into 3 green classes to welcome children from the locality and create a few green jobs for young people. On the ground, two eco-houses allow tourists to be welcomed with the aim of developing the eco-tourism offer as an alternative source of income for the locals. A renewable fund of 1,000,000 francs has likewise been put in place by the community with the support of the UNDP's GEF SPG in order to allocate microcredits to women, and also to finance entrepreneurial initiatives.17 A series of strip cartoons which present the adventure of Tayap development and the problems of African villages facing deforestation and cultivation on burned ground has likewise been created within the framework of the project.

In 2015, the AFD (French Development Agency) and the CIRAD (Centre for international cooperation in agronomical research for development) awarded the Ecological Orchards of Tayap “Agriculture and Forests Climate Challenge” prize for Lessening of climatic disruption in agriculture. In 2016, the ISTF Innovation Prize from Yale University was awarded to the project.

== Transport ==
Tayap is located about an hour from Yaounde and two hours from Douala along the motorway which links them. The line of the Douala-Yaounde railwayline does not serve the village of Tayap.

== See also ==
=== Further reading ===
- Achille Mbembe, 1996, La naissance du maquis dans le Sud-Cameroun (1920-1960). Histoire des usages de la raison en colonie, Paris, Karthala, 438 p., (ISBN 9782865376001)
- Clément Yonta Ngoune, 2010, Le contexte géologique des indices de talc de la région de Boumnyebel, Université Henri Poincaré (Nancy I) et université de Yaoundé I (thèse de doctorat en Sciences de la Terre), 425 p.
- Agripo, 2014, La monographie du village de Tayap. Tayap, Éditions Agripo, 36 p.
- Agripo, Winnie et Stéphanie Dordain, Tayap, la forêt enchantée, CreateSpace Independent Publishing Platform, 2015, 42 p. (strip cartoon)
- Adeline Flore Ngo Samnick (en collaboration avec Mireille Esther Ngo Mbanga et Émilienne Lionelle Ngo Samnick), Aux 1 000 saveurs de Tayap, CreateSpace Independent Publishing Platform, 2016, 104 p. (ISBN 978-1519271174)

=== Related articles ===
- Deforestation in Cameroon

=== External links ===
- Media related to Tayap at Wikimedia Commons
- Agripo
- Nicolas Richoffer, « Les vergers écologiques ont tout bon au Cameroun », 20 minutes, 23 février 2015
- « Les nouveaux résilients (4/7) : la militante antibrûlis », Terra Eco, 6 mars 2015
- Christophe Paget, « Le journal de la COP21 du vendredi 11 décembre », RFI, 11 décembre 2015 (interview)
- Josiane Kouagheu, « Tayap, le village écologique qui crée des emplois verts au Cameroun », Le Monde Afrique, 11 février 2016
