= Economy of Cameroon =

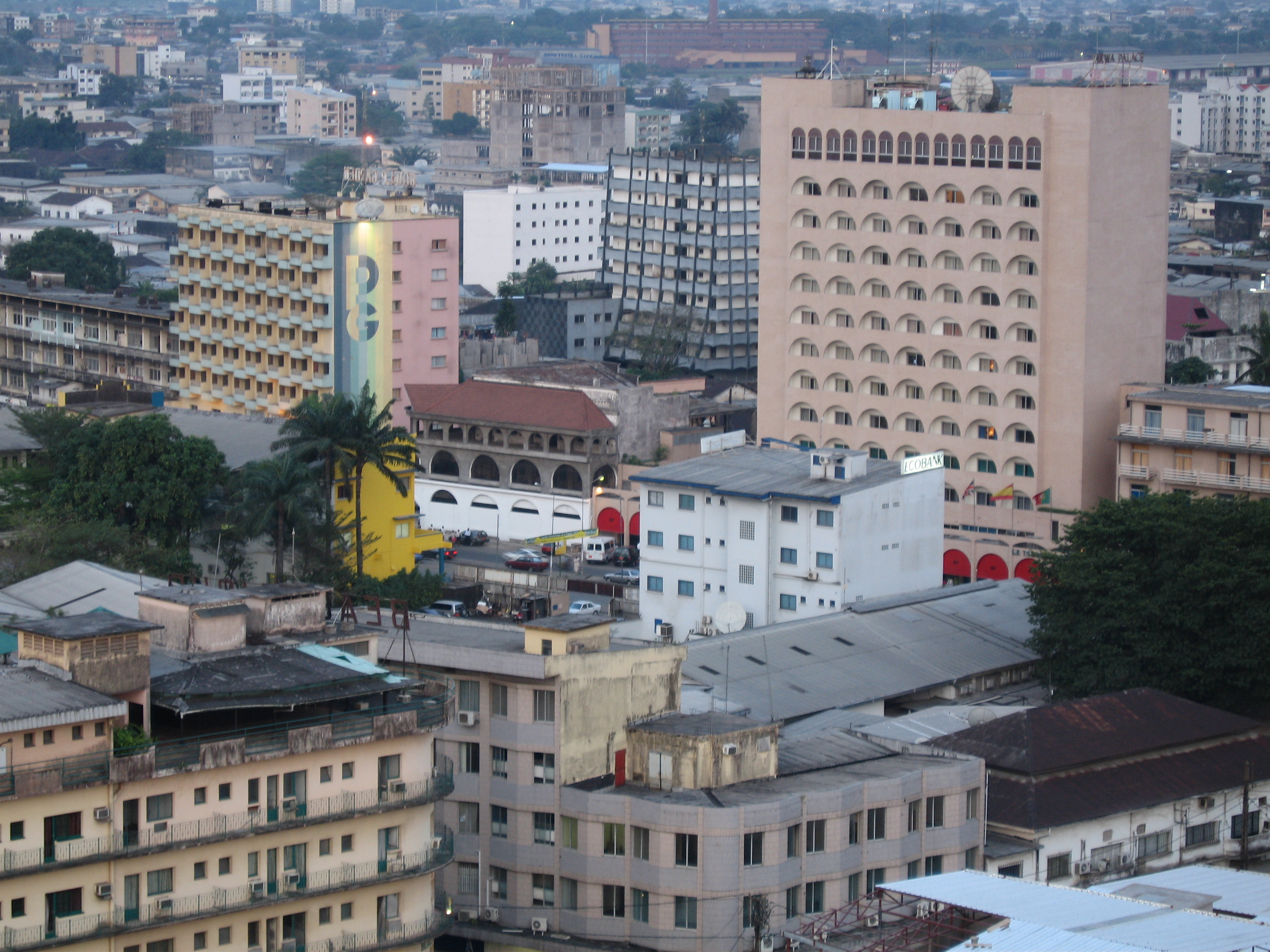
- Douala, the economic capital of Cameroon
- Currency: CFA franc (XAF)
- Fiscal year: Calendar year
- Trade organisations: AU, AfCFTA (signed), ECCAS, WTO
- Country group: Developing/Emerging; Lower-middle income economy

Statistics
- Population: ▲30,058,421 (2025)
- GDP: ▲$60.58 billion (nominal; 2025); ▲$173.30 billion (PPP; 2025)
- GDP rank: 87th (nominal; 2025); 86th (PPP; 2025)
- GDP growth: 3.6% (2024); 3.6% (2025)
- GDP per capita: ▲$2,027 (nominal; 2025); ▲$5,790 (PPP; 2025)
- GDP per capita rank: 152nd (nominal; 2025); 147th (PPP; 2025)
- GDP per capita growth: 0.9% (2024)
- GDP by sector: agriculture: 32.2%; industry: 17.2%; services: 50.6%; (2024 est.)
- Inflation (CPI): 3.4% (2025 est.)
- Population below national poverty line: 22% (2024, World Bank); 23% on less than $3.20/day (estimated in 2024)
- Gini coefficient: 42.2 medium (2014, World Bank)
- Human Development Index: ▲0.588 medium (2024) (148th); 0.470 low IHDI (2023)
- Labour force: ▲11,118,837 (2024); 62.9% employment rate (2024)
- Labour force by occupation: agriculture: 32.2%; industry: 17.2%; commerce: 50.6%; (2024 est.)
- Unemployment: 3.5% (2024 est.)
- Main industries: petroleum production and refining, aluminium production, food processing, light consumer goods, textiles, lumber, ship repair

External
- Exports: ▲$7 billion (2024 est.)
- Export goods: crude oil and petroleum products, lumber, cocoa beans, aluminium, coffee, cotton
- Main export partners: China 17%; France 8.9%; India 7.2%; Russia 6.8%; Belgium 3.8%; (2024)
- Imports: ▲$10.58 billion (2024 est.)
- Import goods: machinery, electrical equipment, transport equipment, fuel, food
- Main import partners: China 19%; France 7.6%; Nigeria 5.5%; India 4.8%; Russia 4.4%; (2024)
- Current account: ▲ −$1.2 billion (2024 est.)
- Gross external debt: ▲$15.104 billion (31 December 2024 est.)

Public finance
- Government debt: ▲37% of GDP (2024 est.)
- Foreign reserves: ▲$5.8 billion (31 December 2024 est.)
- Budget balance: −0.4% (of GDP) (2024 est.)
- Revenue: ▲$8.630 billion (2024 est.)
- Spending: ▲$9.370 billion (2024 est.)
- Economic aid: The Paris Club agreed to reduce Cameroon's debt of $1.3 billion by $900 million, debt relief now totals $1.26 billion (2001)
- Credit rating: Standard & Poor's: B- (Domestic); B (Foreign); BBB- (T&C Assessment)
- All values, unless otherwise stated, are in US dollars.

Cameroon has a developing economy considered lower-middle income. It was one of the most prosperous in Africa for a quarter of a century after independence. The drop in commodity prices for its principal exports – petroleum, cocoa, coffee, and cotton – in the mid-1980s, combined with an overvalued currency and economic mismanagement, led to a decade-long recession. Real per capita GDP fell by more than 60% from 1986 to 1994. The current account and fiscal deficits widened, and foreign debt grew. Yet because of its oil reserves and favorable agricultural conditions, Cameroon still has one of the best-endowed primary commodity economies in sub-Saharan Africa.

== Sectors ==
=== Agriculture ===
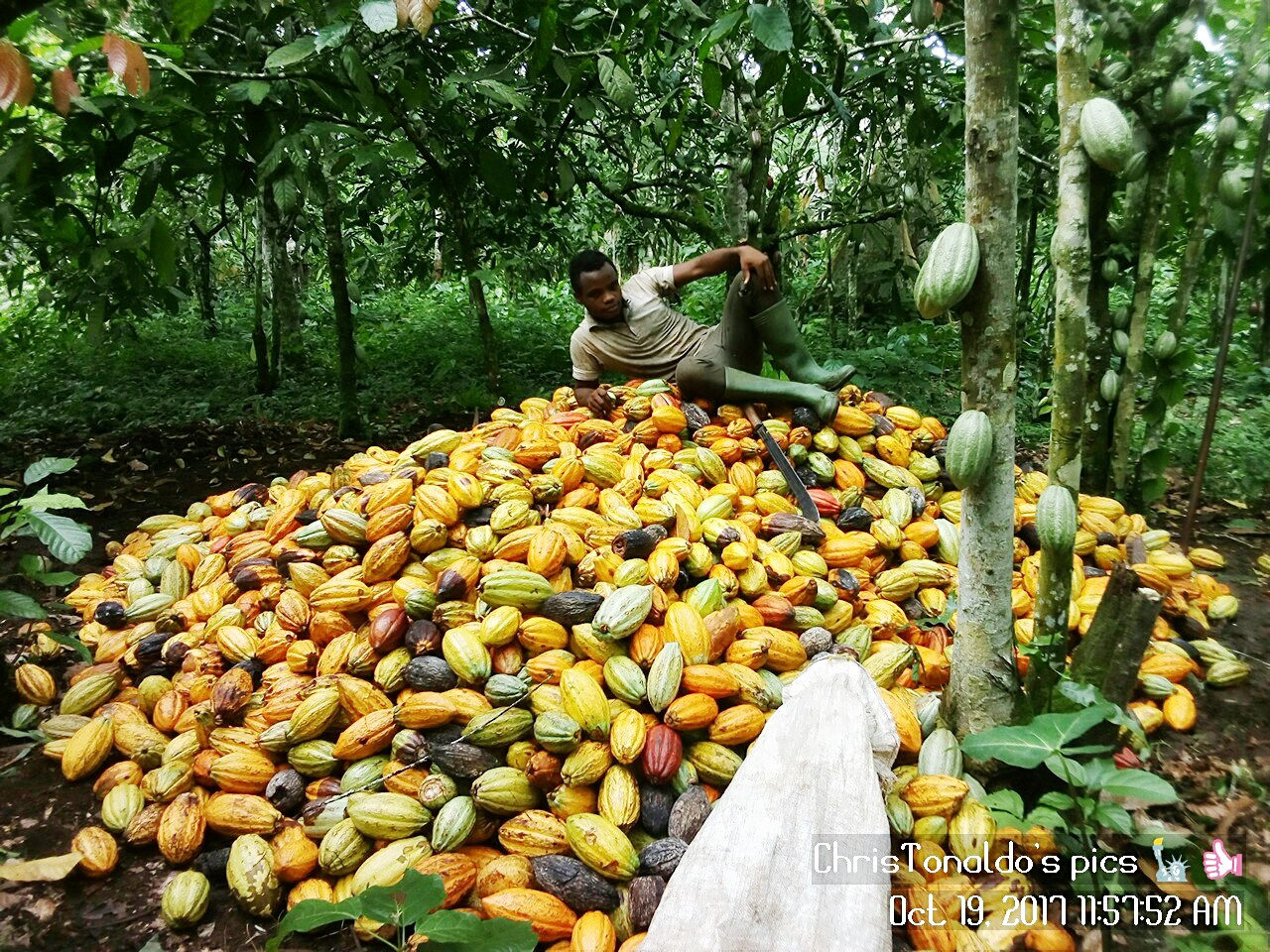
Cocoa Farm

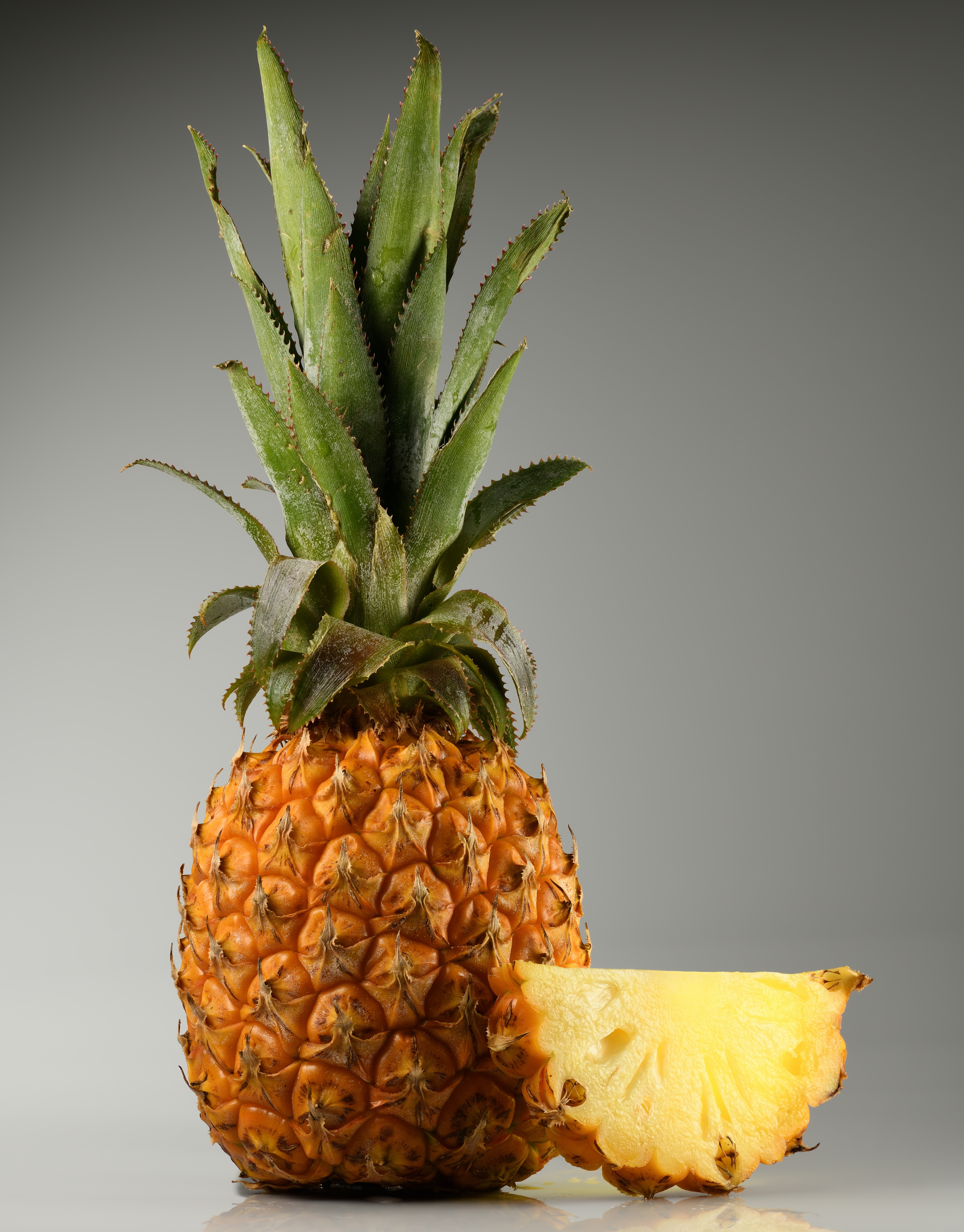
Pineapple 'Victoria', grown in Cameroon

Agriculture in Cameroon is an important part of the Economy of Cameroon. It is one of the largest producers of Taro, cocoa bean, Palm oil and Cooking banana in the world. Approximately 70% of the workers in the country are involved in agriculture, and over 80% of the economically important industries are connected.

In 2024, Cameroon produced:

- 19 million tons of cassava (6th largest producer in the world);
- 3.9 million tonnes of plantain (3rd largest producer in the world, only behind Congo and Ghana);
- 2.6 million tons of palm oil (7th largest producer in the world);
- 2.3 million tons of maize;
- 1.9 million tons of taro (3rd largest producer in the world, second only to Nigeria and China);
- 1.4 million tons of sorghum;
- 1.2 million tons of banana;
- 1.2 million tons of sugarcane;
- 1 million tons of tomato (19th largest producer in the world);
- 674,000 tonnes of yam (7th largest producer in the world);
- 594,000 tons of peanut;
- 410,000 tons of sweet potato;
- 402,000 tons of beans;
- 332,000 tons of rice;
- 310,000 tons of pineapple;
- 307,000 tons of cocoa (5th largest producer in the world, after Ivory Coast, Ghana, Indonesia and Nigeria);
- 302,000 tons of potato;
- 301,000 tons of onion;
- 249,000 tons of cotton.

In addition to smaller productions of other agricultural products, such as coffee (33,000 tons) and natural rubber (55,000 tons).

=== Mining ===
Despite being a mineral rich country, Cameroon has only recently begun to investigate mining on an industrial scale. Strong metal and industrial mineral prices since 2003 have encouraged companies to develop mines here. The terrain mainly consists of granite-rich ground with areas of ultramafic rocks that are sources of cobalt and nickel. There are also deposits of bauxite, gold, iron ore, nepheline syenite, and rutile. Alluvial gold is mainly mined by artisanal miners.

=== Finance and banking ===
Cameroon's financial system is the largest in the CEMAC region. Access to financial services is limited, particularly for SMEs. Aside from a traditional tendency for banks to prefer dealing with large, established companies, determining factors are also found in interest rates for loans to SMEs being capped at 15 percent and being heavily taxed. As of 2006, bank loans to SMEs hardly reached 15 percent of total outstanding loans (Molua, 2002).

Around 25 percent of Cameroonians have access to a bank account(as of 2024). While the microfinance sector is consequently becoming increasingly important, its development is hampered by a loose regulatory and supervisory framework for microfinance institutions (MFIs). The banking sector is highly concentrated and dominated by foreign commercial banks. 6 out of the 11 largest commercial banks are foreign-owned, and the three largest banks hold more than 50 percent of total financial system assets. While foreign banks generally display good solvency ratios, small domestic banks are in a much weaker position. Their capitalization is well below the average of banks in the CEMAC region and their profits are close to 2 percent, compared to 20 percent for foreign banks in the country. This is partially explained by the high levels of non-performing loans, which reached 12 percent in 2007, leading to most banks holding large amounts of excess reserves as a percentage of deposits and large levels of unutilized liquidity.

In 2018, Cameroon's financial system is being requested by the International Monetary Fund (IMF) to increase its tax base to cover the losses from the North-West and South-West Cameroon's regions instabilities, the loss of oil revenue, the failure to deliver on port facilities, and the decline in oil production from mature oil fields.

==== Climate finance ====
Climate finance in Cameroon comprises a mixture of the Forest Investment Program (FIP), domestic, and internationally sourced funding for climate change sustainability, control, and resilience. As Cameroon is built on the coastal regions with the highest risk of flood mortality, its economic resources of agriculture, on which 60% of its population relies, are shaken. This attracts the question of climate finance to salvage livelihood and security. According to the United Nations Development Programme (UNDP), countries need more finance for their climate targets than they can source domestically. It also reported that in 2009, high-income countries with a significant historical contribution to climate change committed to raising US$100 billion annually by 2020 to fund climate action in low-income countries.

Thus, in African countries like Cameroon, climate funds become an important source of finance to manage the climate crisis. The report from UNDP stated that 50 percent of mitigation financing tracked in Africa between 2011-2021 came from MDBs ($37 billion) and 45 percent from bilateral sources ($33.47 billion). It should be remembered that Cameroon signed the Global Methane Pledge to reduce global methane emissions by at least 30% from 2020 levels by 2030. The World Bank on Climate Change and Development Report (CCDR) in Cameroon, estimated the GDP loss to range from 4 to 10 percent in the most pessimistic scenario by 2050 if no action is taken. The indication is that climate change will also increase the balance of payments needs and require fiscal space.

Cameroon faces challenges in its climate finance mitigation. A study carried out by Lueong and Suiven on in-depth understanding and knowledge on the different tools, effectiveness, and challenges affecting climate finance in Cameroon, reported diverse funding sources, international climate funds, bilateral agreements, and national budget allocations. Another research stated that Cameroon's major challenge is inadequate financial resources to mitigate climate change.

=== Tourism ===
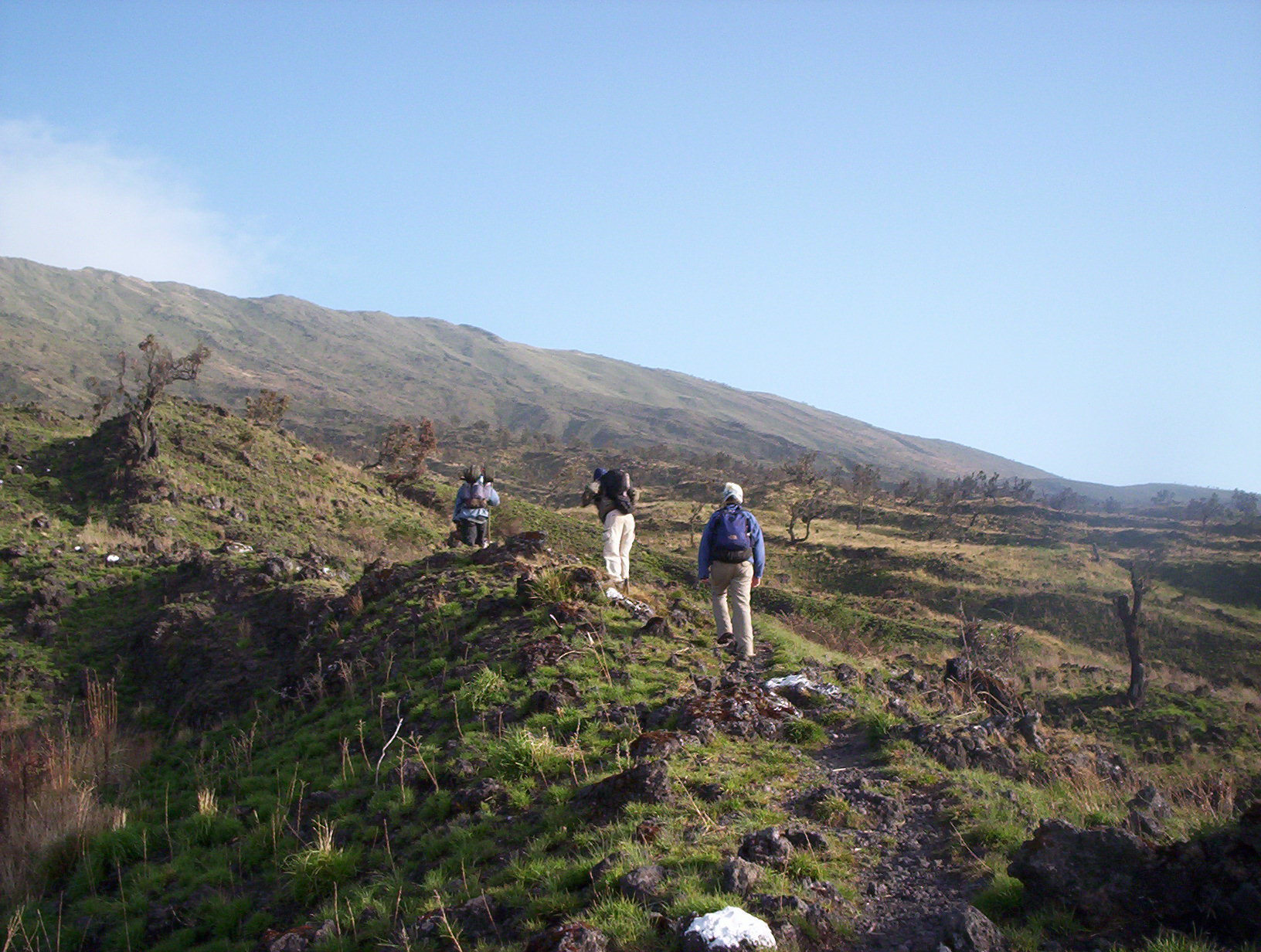
Tourists climbing Mount Cameroon, Southwest Province.

Tourism in Cameroon is a growing but relatively minor industry. Since the 1970s, the government of Cameroon has cultivated the industry by creating a ministry of tourism and by encouraging investment by airlines, hotels, and travel agencies. The government describes the country as "Africa in miniature", promoting its diversity of climate, culture, and geography. Cameroon's wildlife draws both safari-goers and big-game hunters, as Cameroon is home to many of Africa's iconic animals: cheetahs, chimpanzees, elephants, giraffes, gorillas, hippopotami, and rhinoceroses. Impediments to further growth of the tourism sector include poor transport infrastructure and corrupt officials who may harass visitors for bribes.

=== Transport ===
Different transportation options available in Cameroon. These options are available to citizens and tourists such as railways, roadways, waterways, pipelines, and airlines. These avenues of transport are used by citizens for personal transportation, of goods, and by tourists for both accessing the country and traveling.

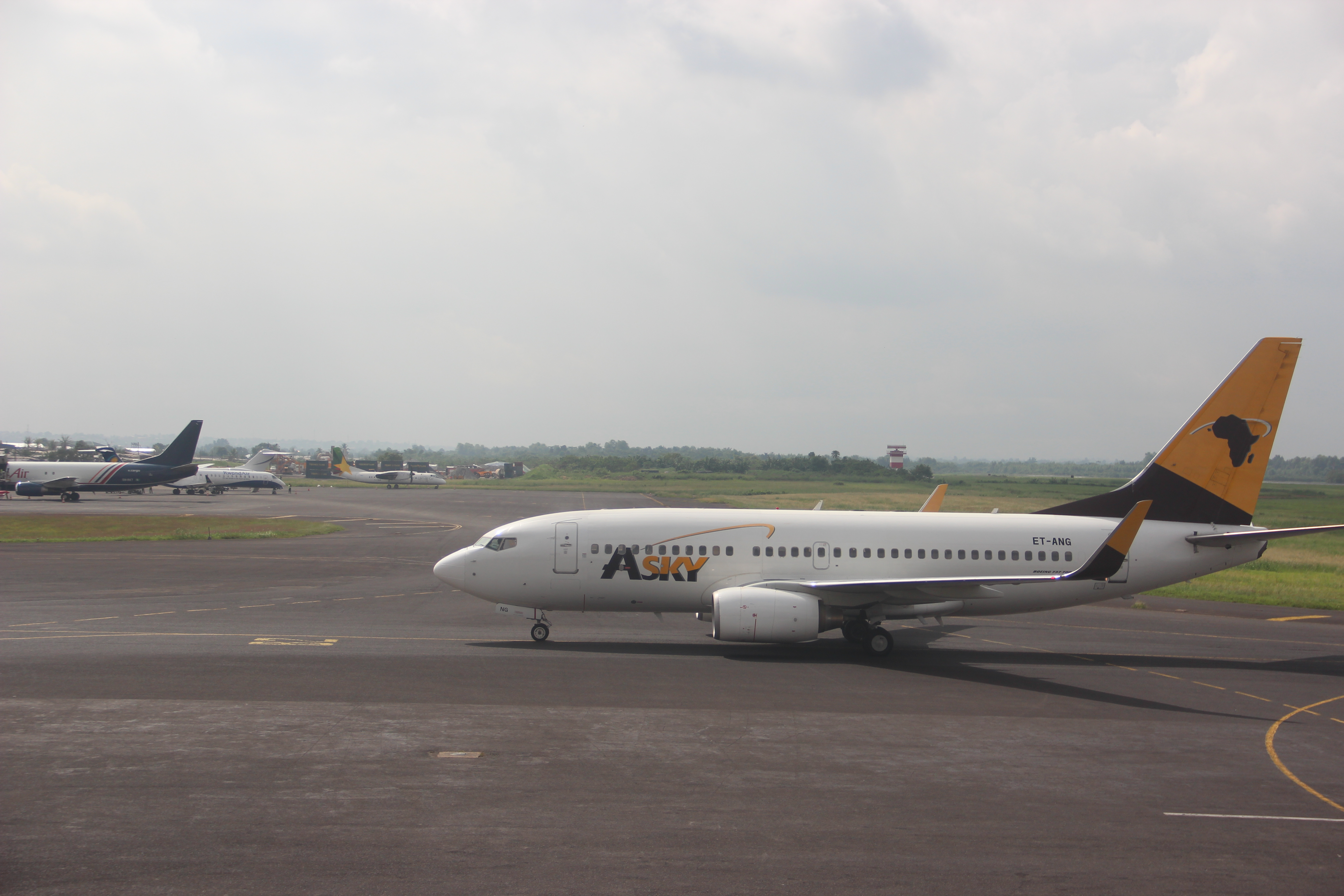
Douala International Airport

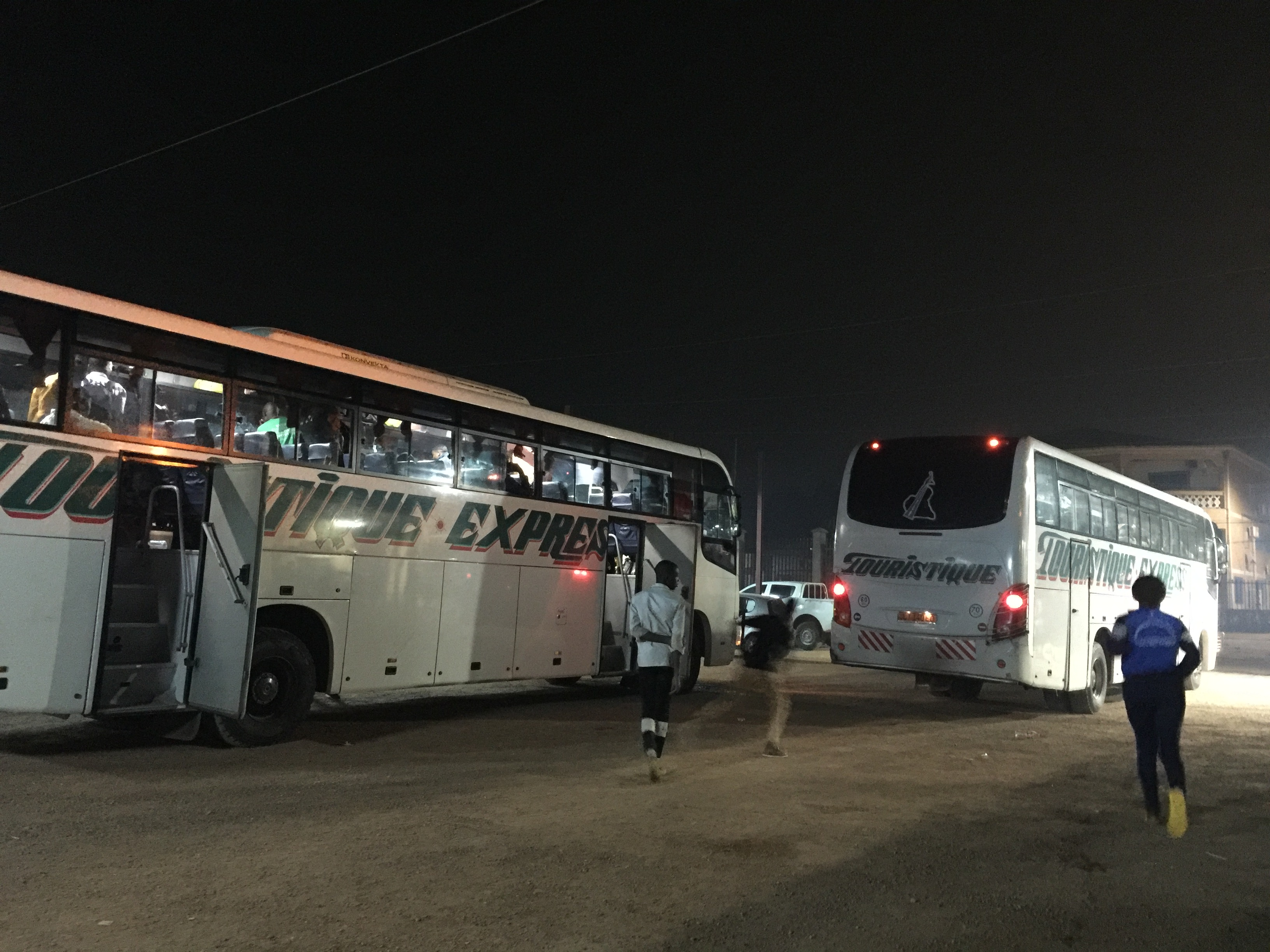
Intercity buses in transit during the night (Touristique Express)

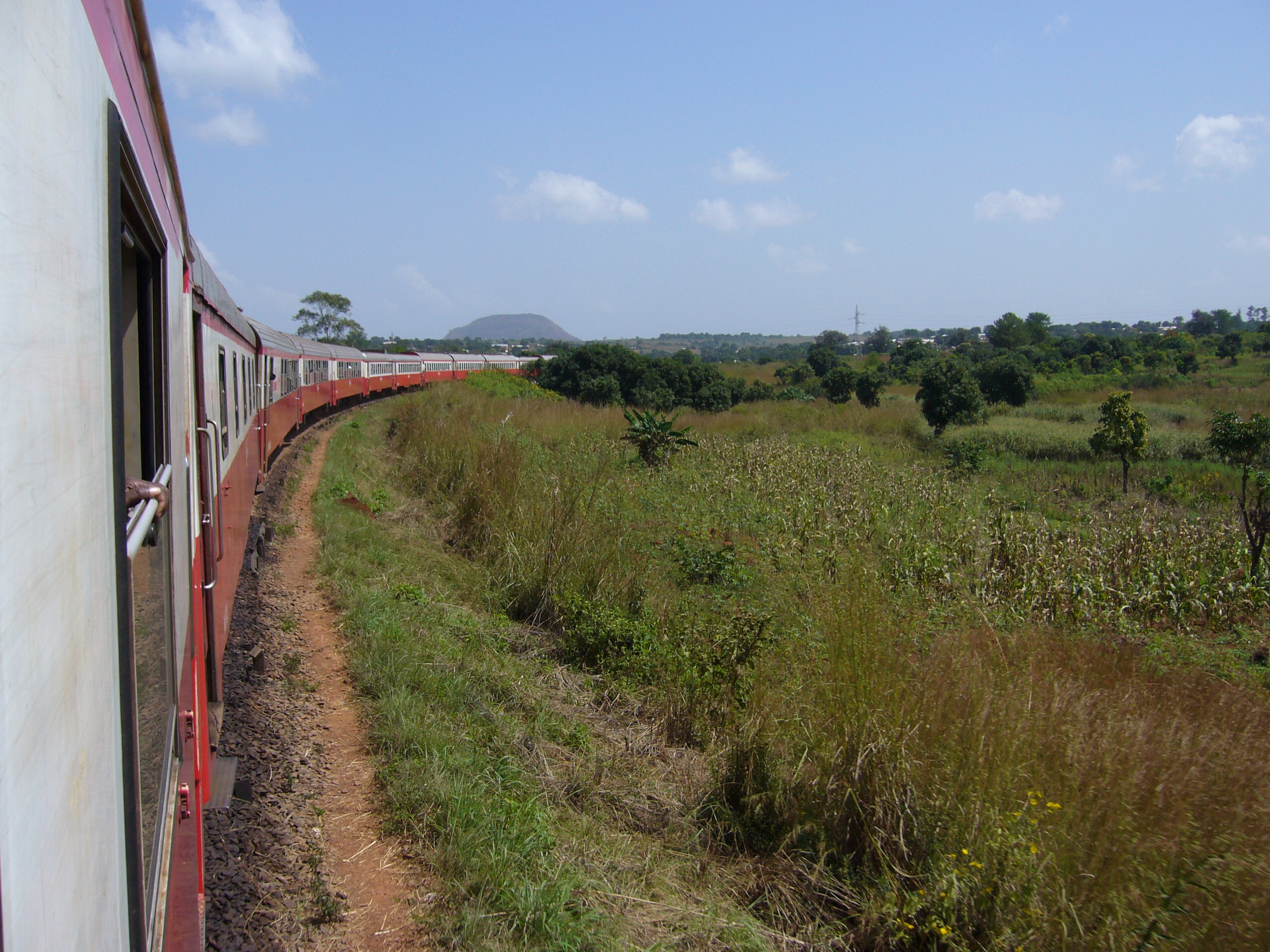
Interurban passenger train on the move in Cameroon (Douala-Yaounde-Ngaoundere)

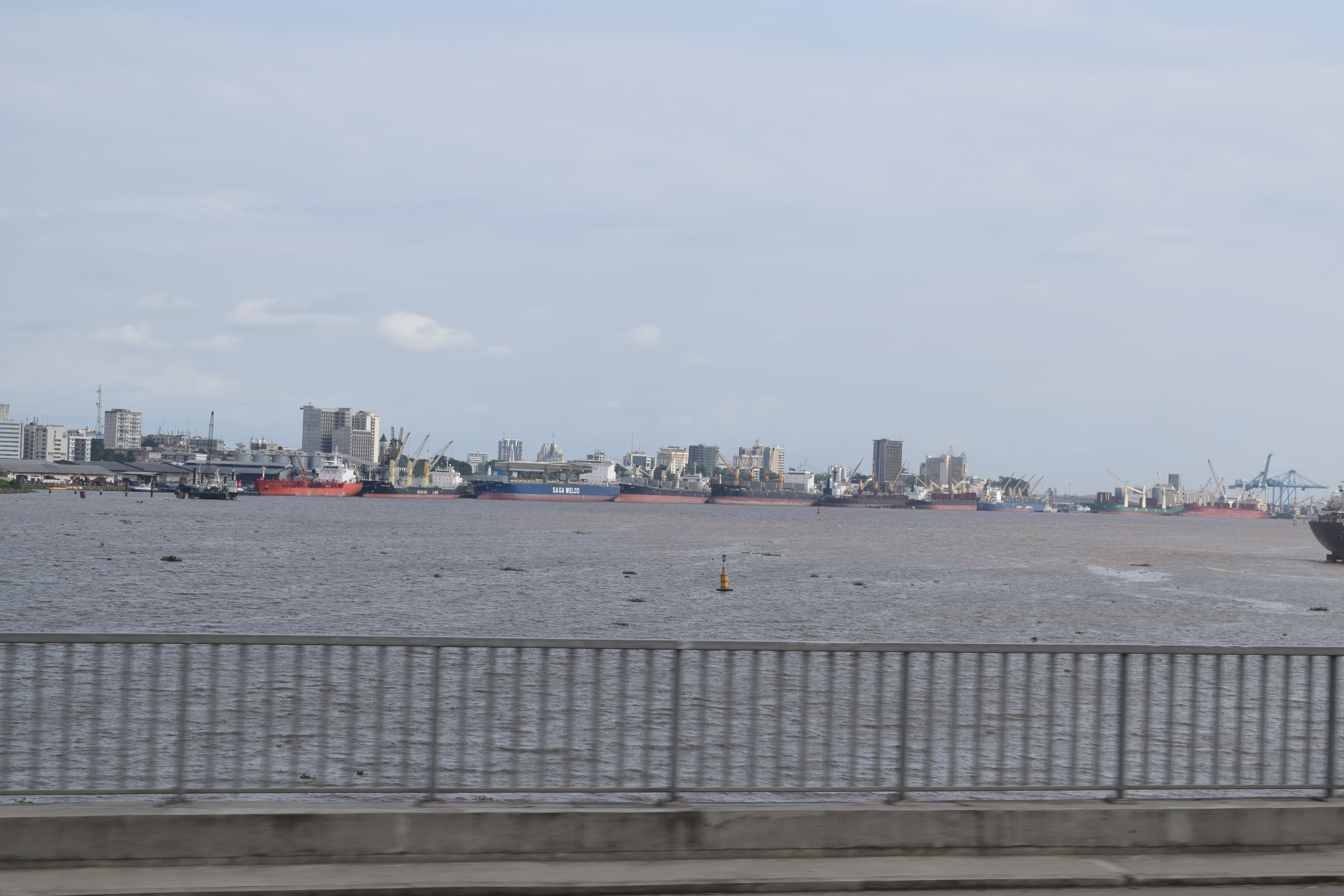
Douala Seaport

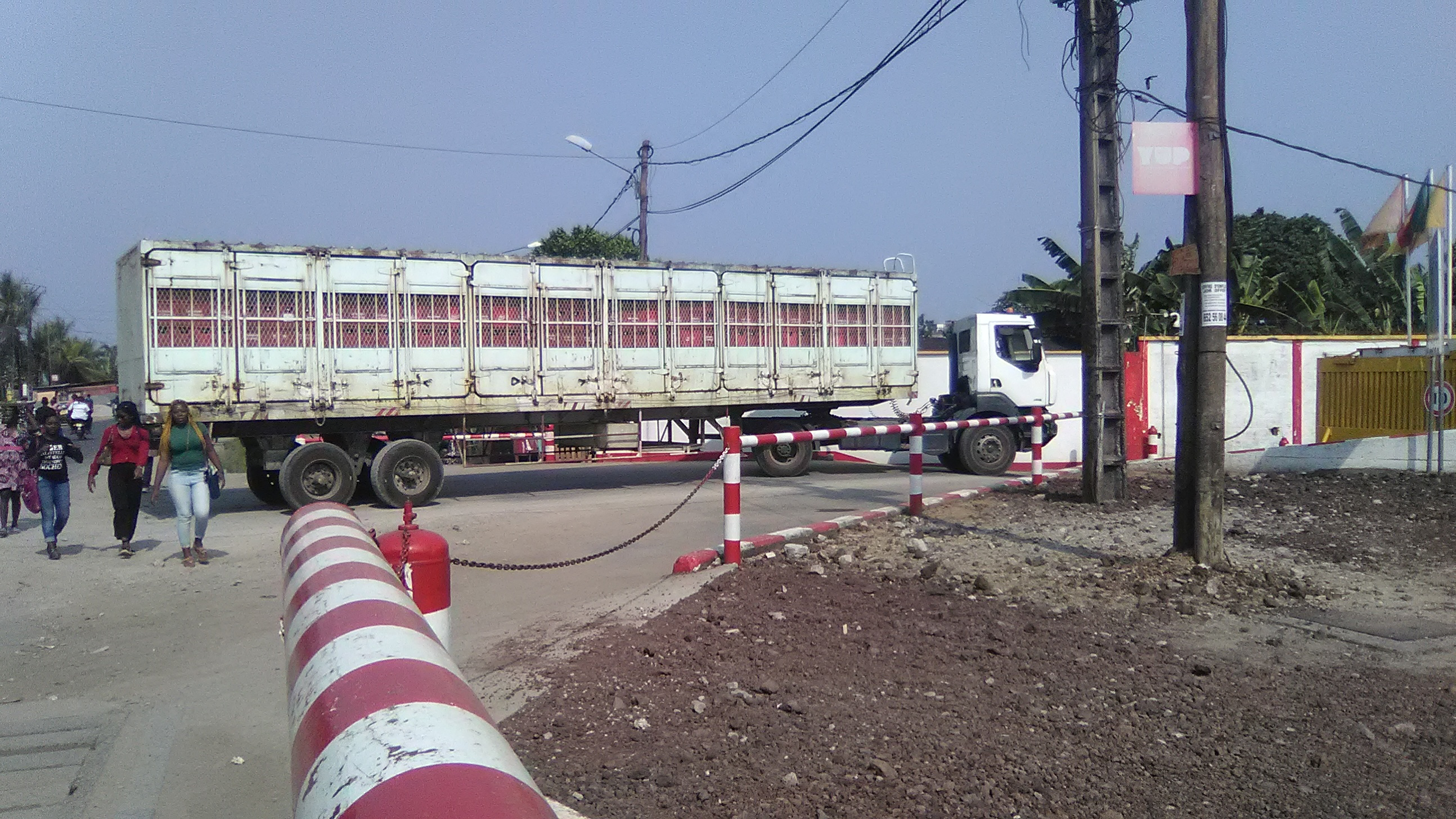
A truck transporting beers to various localities in Cameroon

== Foreign trade ==
Exports of Cameroon by product category (2019) Chemical products Transportation Machines Mineral products Plastics and rubbers Metals Foodstuffs Precious metals Textiles Instruments Animal products Vegetable products Paper goods Footwear and headwear Miscellaneous Stone and glass Wood products Animal and vegetable bi-products Animal hides Arts and antiques Weapons

Cargo shipped to Cameroonian ports must be covered by a bordereau électronique de suivi des cargaisons (BESC), an electronic cargo tracking note issued by the Conseil national des chargeurs du Cameroun (CNCC).

== Macro-economic trend ==
Cameroon became an oil-producing country in 1977. Claiming to want to make reserves for difficult times, the authorities manage "off-budget" oil revenues in total opacity (the funds are placed in Paris, Switzerland and New York accounts). Several billion dollars are thus diverted to the benefit of oil companies and regime officials. The influence of France and its 9,000 nationals in Cameroon remains considerable. African Affairs magazine noted in the early 1980s that they "continue to dominate almost all key sectors of the economy, much as they did before independence. French nationals control 55% of the modern sector of the Cameroonian economy and their control over the banking system is total.

Recent signs, however, are encouraging. As of March 1998, Cameroon's fifth IMF program – a 3-year enhanced structural adjustment program approved in August 1997 – is on track. Cameroon has rescheduled its Paris Club debt at favorable terms. GDP has grown by about 5% a year beginning in 1995. There is cautious optimism that Cameroon is emerging from its long period of economic hardship.

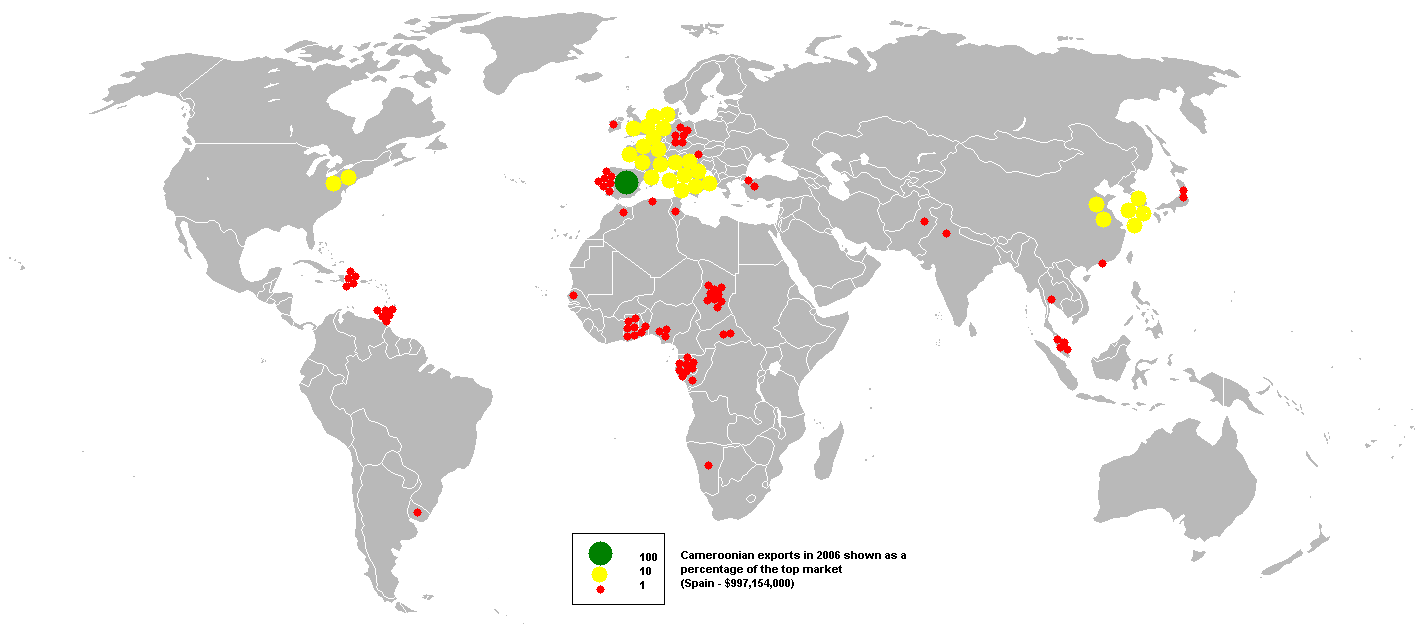
Cameroonian exports in 2006

The Enhanced Structural Adjustment Facility (ESAF) signed recently by the IMF and Government of Cameroon calls for greater macroeconomic planning and financial accountability; privatization of most of Cameroon's nearly 100 remaining non-financial parastatal enterprises; elimination of state marketing board monopolies on the export of cocoa, certain coffees, and cotton; privatization and price competition in the banking sector; implementation of the 1992 labor code; a vastly improved judicial system; and political liberalization to boost investment.

France is Cameroon's main trading partner and source of private investment and foreign aid. Cameroon has an investment guaranty agreement and a bilateral accord with the United States. USA investment in Cameroon is about $1 million, most of it in the oil sector. Inflation has been brought back under control. Cameroon aims at becoming emerging by 2035.

The government embarked upon a series of economic reform programs supported by the World Bank and International Monetary Fund (IMF) beginning in the late 1980s. Many of these measures have been painful; the government slashed civil service salaries by 65% in 1993. The CFA franc – the common currency of Cameroon and 13 other African states – was devalued by 50% in January 1994. The government failed to meet the conditions of the first four IMF programs.

This is a chart of trend of gross domestic product of Cameroon at market prices estimated by the International Monetary Fund with figures in millions of Central African CFA Francs.

Year	Gross Domestic Product	US Dollar Exchange
1980	1,600,186	209.20 Francs
1985	4,355,977	471.12 Francs
1990	3,804,428	300.65 Francs
1995	4,686,286	518.62 Francs
2000	6,612,385	658.21 Francs
2005	8,959,279	527.29 Francs

The following table shows the main economic indicators in 1980–2022. Inflation below 5% is in green.

Year	GDP (in Bil. US$PPP)	GDP per capita (in US$ PPP)	GDP (in Bil. US$nominal)	GDP growth (real)	Inflation rate (in Percent)	Government debt (in % of GDP)
1980	11.1	1,263	8.85	▲9.9%	▲7.7%	n/a
1981	▲14.3	▲1,572	▲10.03	▲17.1%	▲7.5%	n/a
1982	▲16.3	▲1,747	▼9.62	▲7.6%	▲15.3%	n/a
1983	▲18.1	▲1,887	▲9.69	▲6.8%	▲20.5%	n/a
1984	▲20.1	▲2,047	▲10.24	▲7.5%	▲12.1%	n/a
1985	▲22.4	▲2,223	▲10.70	▲8.1%	▲4.2%	n/a
1986	▲24.4	▲2,357	▲13.95	▲6.8%	▲4.3%	n/a
1987	▲24.5	▼2,298	▲16.15	▼-2.2%	▲2.8%	n/a
1988	▼23.4	▼2,129	▲16.40	▼-7.9%	▲1.7%	n/a
1989	▼23.9	▼2,110	▼14.63	▼-1.8%	▲1.6%	n/a
1990	▼23.2	▼1,992	▲14.64	▼-6.2%	▲1.5%	n/a
1991	▼23.1	▼1,922	▲16.33	▼-3.8%	▼-0.6%	n/a
1992	▼22.9	▼1,850	▼14.96	▼-3.1%	▲1.9%	n/a
1993	▼22.7	▼1,780	▲15.61	▼-3.2%	▼-3.7%	n/a
1994	▼22.6	▼1,722	▼10.62	▼-2.5%	▲12.7%	n/a
1995	▲23.9	▲1,766	▼10.08	▲3.3%	▲25.8%	n/a
1996	▲25.5	▲1,836	▲11.23	▲4.9%	▲3.9%	n/a
1997	▲27.3	▲1,913	▲11.35	▲5.3%	▲4.8%	n/a
1998	▲29.0	▲1,974	▼11.34	▲4.9%	▲3.2%	68%
1999	▲30.6	▲2,026	▲11.55	▲4.1%	▲1.8%	68%
2000	▲32.3	▲2,084	▼10.25	▲3.4%	▲1.2%	▲76%
2001	▲34.2	▲2,145	▲10.95	▲3.4%	▲4.5%	▼62%
2002	▲36.4	▲2,224	▲12.37	▲4.8%	▲2.8%	▼57%
2003	▲38.9	▲2,318	▲15.94	▲5.0%	▲0.6%	▼52%
2004	▲42.6	▲2,469	▲18.80	▲6.6%	▲0.3%	52%
2005	▲44.5	▲2,509	▲19.53	▲1.2%	▲2.0%	▼44%
2006	▲47.5	▲2,605	▲20.91	▲3.5%	▲4.9%	▼18%
2007	▲50.8	▲2,710	▲23.93	▲4.1%	▲1.1%	▼14%
2008	▲53.2	▲2,764	▲27.71	▲2.9%	▲5.3%	▼11%
2009	▲55.0	▲2,777	▲27.90	▲2.6%	▲3.0%	11%
2010	▲57.2	▲2,814	▼27.53	▲2.9%	▲1.3%	▲14%
2011	▲60.5	▲2,892	▲30.63	▲3.5%	▲3.0%	▲15%
2012	▲63.6	▲2,959	▼30.17	▲4.5%	▲2.4%	▲15%
2013	▲69.1	▲3,130	▲33.73	▲5.0%	▲2.1%	▲17%
2014	▲75.1	▲3,313	▲36.40	▲5.8%	▲1.9%	▲21%
2015	▲79.1	▲3,396	▼32.21	▲5.6%	▲2.7%	▲32%
2016	▲84.4	▲3,527	▲33.81	▲4.5%	▲0.9%	32%
2017	▲90.0	▲3,665	▲36.09	▲3.5%	▲0.6%	▲37%
2018	▲95.9	▲3,803	▲39.99	▲4.0%	▲1.1%	▲38%
2019	▲101.0	▲3,901	▲39.67	▲3.4%	▲2.5%	▲42%
2020	▲102.7	▼3,870	▲40.86	▲0.5%	▲2.5%	▲45%
2021	▲110.9	▲4,073	▲45.39	▲3.6%	▲2.3%	▲46%
2022	▲123.3	▲4,419	▼44.32	▲3.8%	▲4.6%	▲47%

== Gallery ==
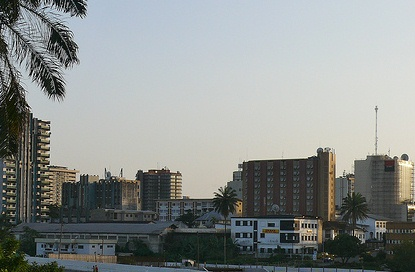
Douala

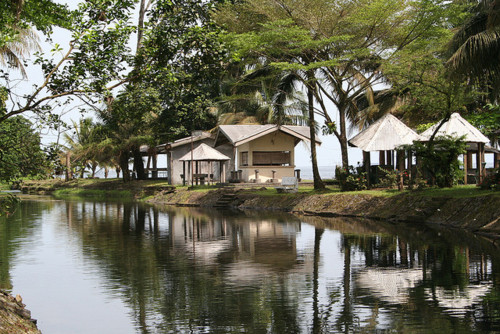
A touristic area in Limbe

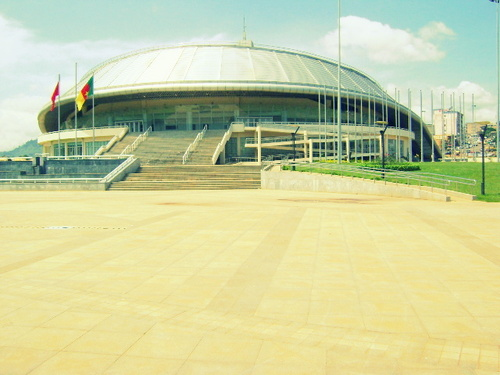
Yaoundé Sport palace

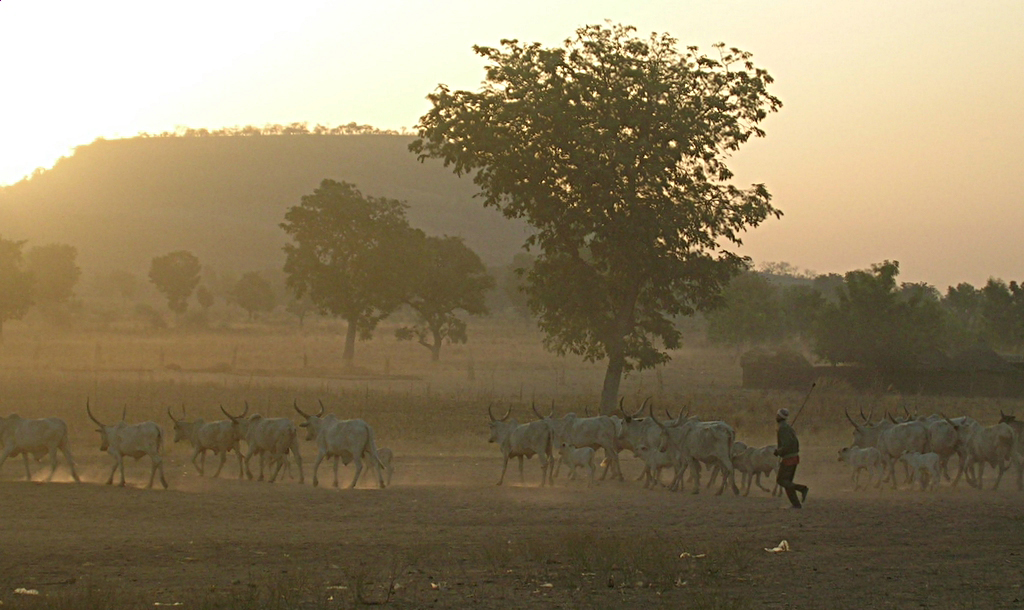
A Fulani herder drives his cattle in northern Cameroon.

== See also ==
- Cameroon
- Transport in Cameroon
- United Nations Economic Commission for Africa
