= Union Centrale des Coopératives Agricoles de l'Ouest =

Cameroonian agricultural cooperative union

- Abbreviation: UCCAO
- Formation: 17 October 1958; 68 years ago
- Type: Agricultural cooperative union
- Headquarters: Bafoussam, West Region
- Region served: Cameroon
- Members: 6 cooperatives (over 100,000 farmers)
- Website: uccao-cameroun.com
- Formerly called: Union des Coopératives de Café Arabica de l'Ouest

The Union Centrale des Coopératives Agricoles de l'Ouest (UCCAO; French for "Central Union of Agricultural Cooperatives of the West") is a Cameroonian union of agricultural cooperatives founded in 1958. It is the largest agricultural cooperative in the West Region of Cameroon and the country's largest coffee producers' cooperative.

Headquartered in Bafoussam, it groups six departmental cooperatives and processes and markets the coffee of its members.

== History ==
The UCCAO was founded on 17 October 1958 as the Union des Coopératives de Café Arabica de l'Ouest (Union of Arabica Coffee Cooperatives of the West). At its creation it brought together seven cooperatives, the oldest being those of Dschang and Foumban, founded in 1932 and 1933. In 1978 the union diversified its activities and took its current name.

== Organization ==
The UCCAO groups more than 100,000 farmers in six cooperatives:

- CAPLAME (Menoua, in Dschang)
- CAPLABAM (Bamboutos, in Mbouda)
- CAPLABA (Noun, in Foumban)
- CAPLAMI (Mifi, in Bafoussam)
- CAPLAHN (Haut-Nkam, in Bafang)
- CAPLANDE (Ndé, in Bangangté)

Its main activity is the processing and marketing of coffee. It operates six hulling plants, in Dschang (two), Bafoussam, Foumban, Foumbot and Mbouda. Its share capital is 870 million CFA francs.

== See also ==
- Agriculture in Cameroon
