= Messondo =

Coordinates: 3.6975°N 10.4528°E

- Commune and town
- Interactive map of Messondo
- Country: Cameroon
- Time zone: UTC+1 (WAT)

Messondo is a town and commune in Cameroon.

== See also ==
- Communes of Cameroon
