= Dibang, Cameroon =

Dibang
- Commune and town
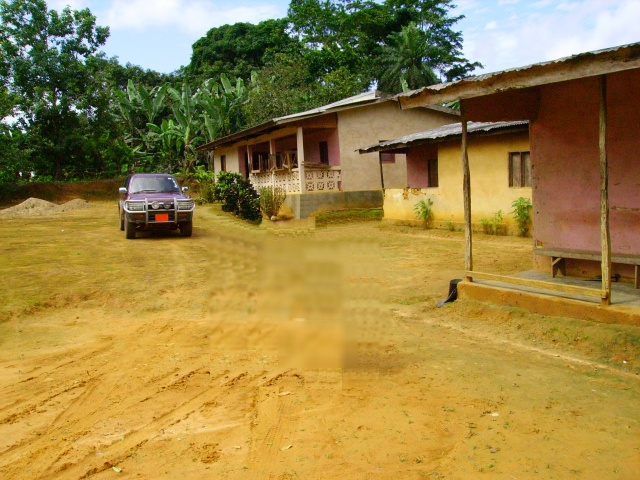
- Interactive map of Dibang
- Coordinates: 3°59′52″N 10°43′10″E
- Country: Cameroon
- Region: Centre
- Department: Nyong-et-Kellé

Population (2005)
  - Total: 9,063
- Time zone: UTC+1 (WAT)

Dibang is a town and commune in the Nyong-et-Kellé department, Centre Region of Cameroon. As of 2005 census, it had a population of 9,063.

== See also ==
- Communes of Cameroon
