= Ngog-Mapubi =

Coordinates: 3.9333°N 10.8500°E

- Commune and town
- Interactive map of Ngog-Mapubi
- Country: Cameroon
- Region: Centre Region
- Time zone: UTC+1 (WAT)

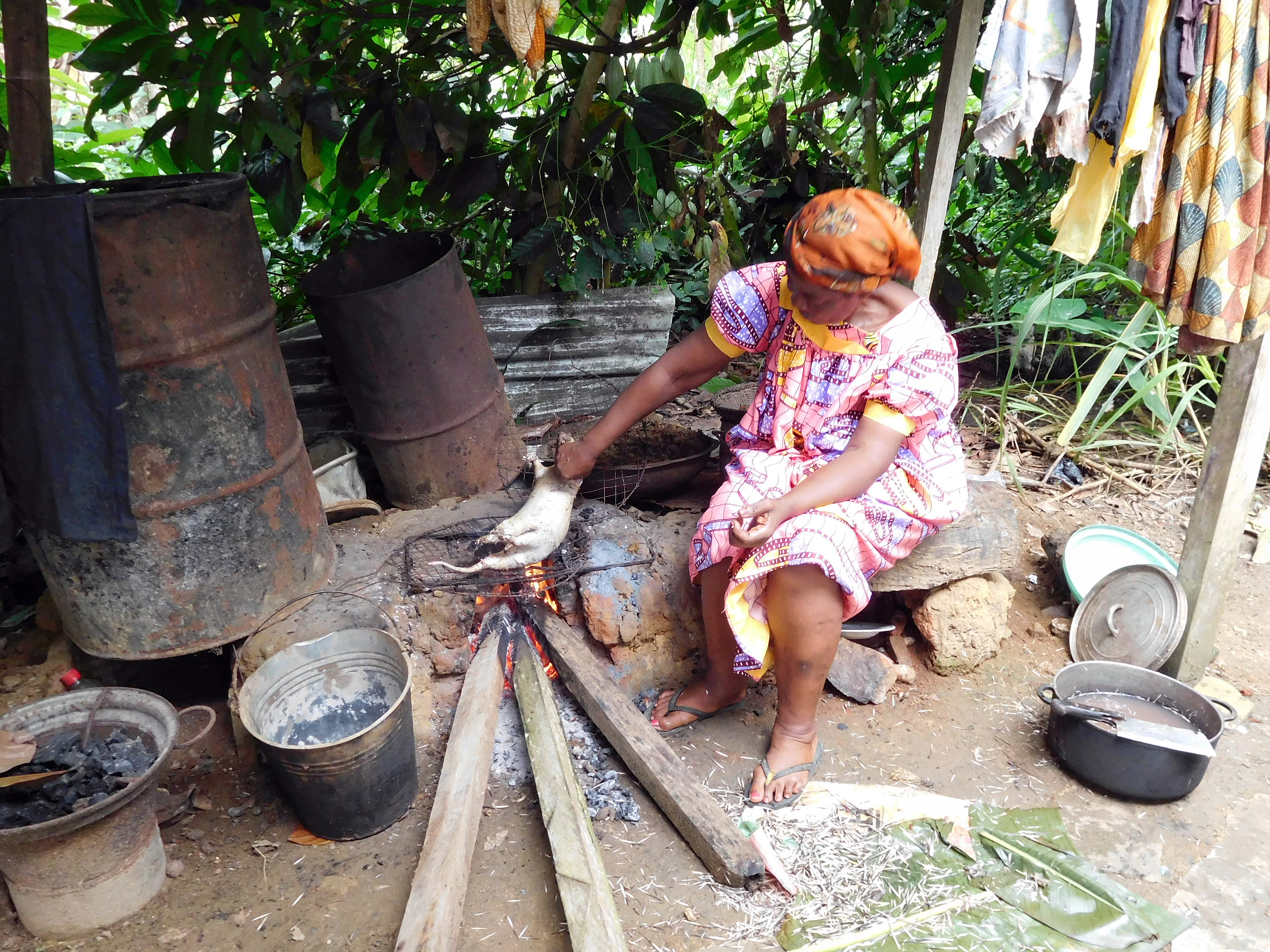

Ngog-Mapubi is a town and commune in Cameroon.

== See also ==
- Communes of Cameroon
- Tayap (village)
