= Bot-Makak =

- Commune and town
- Interactive map of Bot-Makak
- Coordinates: 3°59′53″N 10°53′11″E
- Country: Cameroon
- Time zone: UTC+1 (WAT)

Bot-Makak is a town and commune in Cameroon.

== Demographics ==
Bot-Makak registered a population of 17,089 in the 2005 census. According to that census 50.3% of residents are male and 49.7% are female. 75.1% live rurally, while the other 24.9% live in an urban environment.

== See also ==
- Communes of Cameroon
