= Biyouha =

- Commune and town
- Location in Cameroon
- Coordinates: 3°50′N 10°44′E
- Country: Cameroon
- Time zone: UTC+1 (WAT)

Biyouha is a town and commune in Cameroon.

== See also ==
- Communes of Cameroon
