= Bondjock =

Coordinates: 4.6298°N 11.7068°E

- Commune and town
- Interactive map of Bondjock
- Country: Cameroon
- Time zone: UTC+1 (WAT)

Bondjock is a town and commune in the Nyong-et-Kéllé department of Cameroon.

== See also ==
- Communes of Cameroon
