= Matomb =

- Commune and town
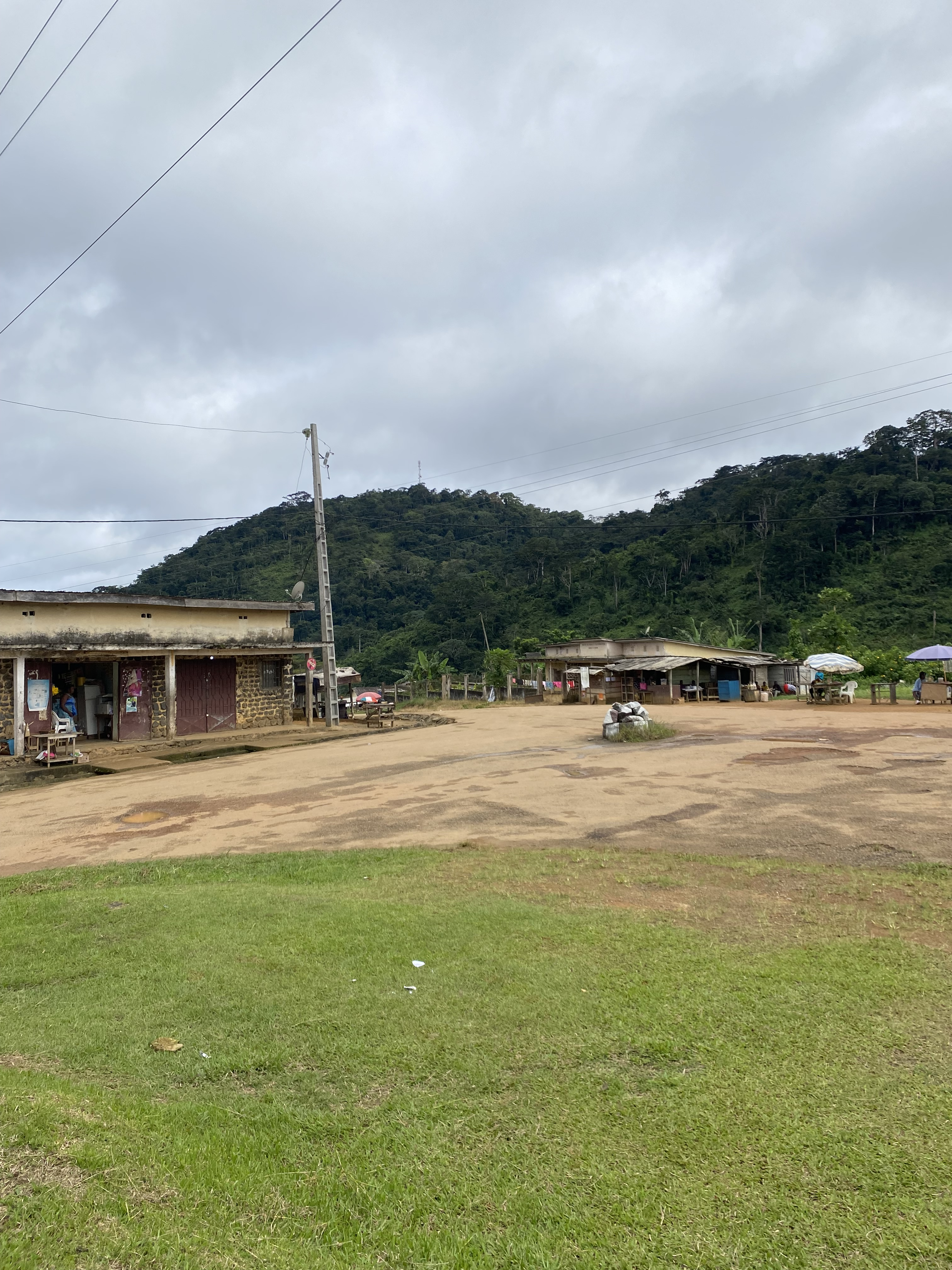
- Interactive map of Matomb
- Coordinates: 3.821276°N 11.061497°E
- Country: Cameroon
- Established: | first_established_date = December 12, 1962

Area
  - Total: 240 sq mi (620 km^{2})

Population
  - Estimate (2005): 11,512
- Time zone: UTC+1 (WAT)
- Website: https://communedematomb.com/

Matomb, located in the Nyong-et-Kéllé department of Cameroon's Centre Region, is a commune situated approximately 65 kilometers southwest of Yaoundé. It serves as the administrative center for the arrondissement bearing the same name. The commune encompasses several villages, including Bingongog, Bomtol, Boumbone, Kombeng, Lamal-Pouguè, Lissé, Mambine, Mandoga, Mandoumba, Manguèn I, Manguèn II, Manyaï, Mawel, Mayebeg, Mayos, Mbemndjock, Mbeng, Nganda, Ngoung, Nkenglikok, Nkongtock, and Pan-Pan.

According to the Third General Population and Housing Census conducted in 2005, Matomb had a population of 11,512 residents, with 2,234 residing in the urban center. The majority of the population belongs to the Bassa ethnic group. Matomb is located just off the Yaoundé-Douala (N3) highway. The region is also a hub for agricultural activity, with a strong emphasis on palm oil production, which is a significant source of income for many local farmers.

== See also ==
- Communes of Cameroon
