= Tupuri language =

Language of Chad and Cameroon

Tupuri
- jäāk Tüpürï
- Native to: Chad, Cameroon
- Ethnicity: Tupuri people
- Native speakers: 320,000 (2005–2019)
- Language family: Niger–Congo?: Atlantic–Congo; Mbum–Day; Mbum; Northern Mbum; Tupuri–Mambai; Tupuri

Language codes
- ISO 639-3: tui
- Glottolog: tupu1244

Tupuri (autonym: jäāk Tüpürï), sometimes rendered as Toupouri, is a language mostly spoken in the Mayo-Kebbi Est Region of southern Chad and in small parts of northern Cameroon. It is an Mbum language spoken by the Tupuri people with approximately 352,000 speakers.

Tupuri was erroneously classified as a Chadic language by Joseph Greenberg, due to a vocabulary list that is actually that of Kera (cf. K. Ebert 1974).

== Distribution ==
Tupuri is predominantly spoken in the southeastern part of the Moulvouday plain, in:

- Kaélé, Porhi, Taibong villages in Moulvouday commune
- Guidigis commune, in Mayo-Kani department
- Kar-Hay, Kalfou, Datcheka, Tchatibali communes in Mayo-Danay department

The Viri or Wina are ethnically Tupuri, but today they speak a Massa dialect.

Tupuri is also spoken in Chad. In Cameroon, it has about 125,000 speakers (SIL 2000).

== Phonology ==
=== Consonants ===
		Labial	Alveolar	Palatal	Velar	Glottal
Plosive/ Affricate	voiceless	p	t	t͡ʃ	k	ʔ
Plosive/ Affricate	voiced	b	d	d͡ʒ	ɡ	
Plosive/ Affricate	prenasal	ᵐb	ⁿd		ᵑɡ	
Plosive/ Affricate	implosive	ɓ	ɗ			
Fricative		f	s			h
Nasal		m	n	ɲ	ŋ	
Rhotic			r			
Lateral			l			
Approximant				j	w	

=== Vowels ===
Oral vowels
	Front	Central	Back
Close	i iː		u uː
Close-mid	e eː		o oː
Open-mid	ɛ ɛː		ɔ ɔː
Open		a aː	

Nasal vowels
	Front	Central	Back
Close	ĩ ĩː		ũ ũː
Close-mid	ẽ ẽː		õ õː
Open		ã ãː	
