= Mayo-Danay =

- Department
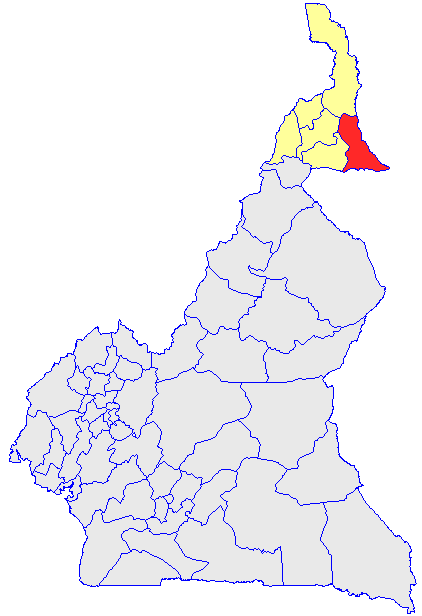
- Department location in Cameroon

- Location within Cameroon Location within Africa
- Coordinates: 10°20′N 15°14′E
- Country: Cameroon
- Province: Extreme-Nord Province
- Capital: Yagoua

Area
  - Total: 2,047 sq mi (5,303 km^{2})

Population (2005)
  - Total: 529,061
- Time zone: UTC+1 (WAT)

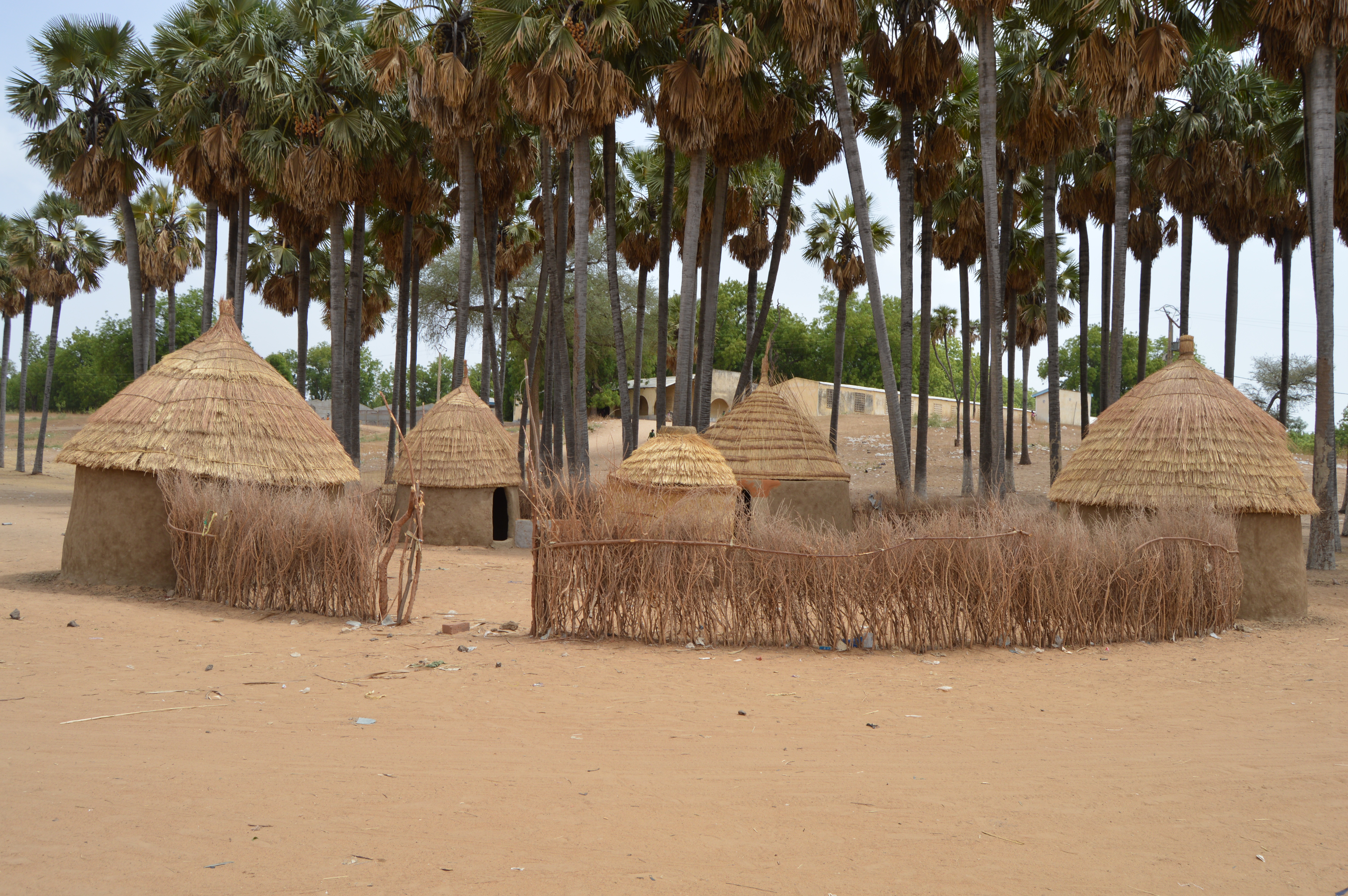
Village, Yagoua

Mayo-Danay is a department of Far North Province, Cameroon. The department covers an area of 5,303 km^{2} and at the 2005 Census had a total population of 529,061. The capital of the department is at Yagoua.

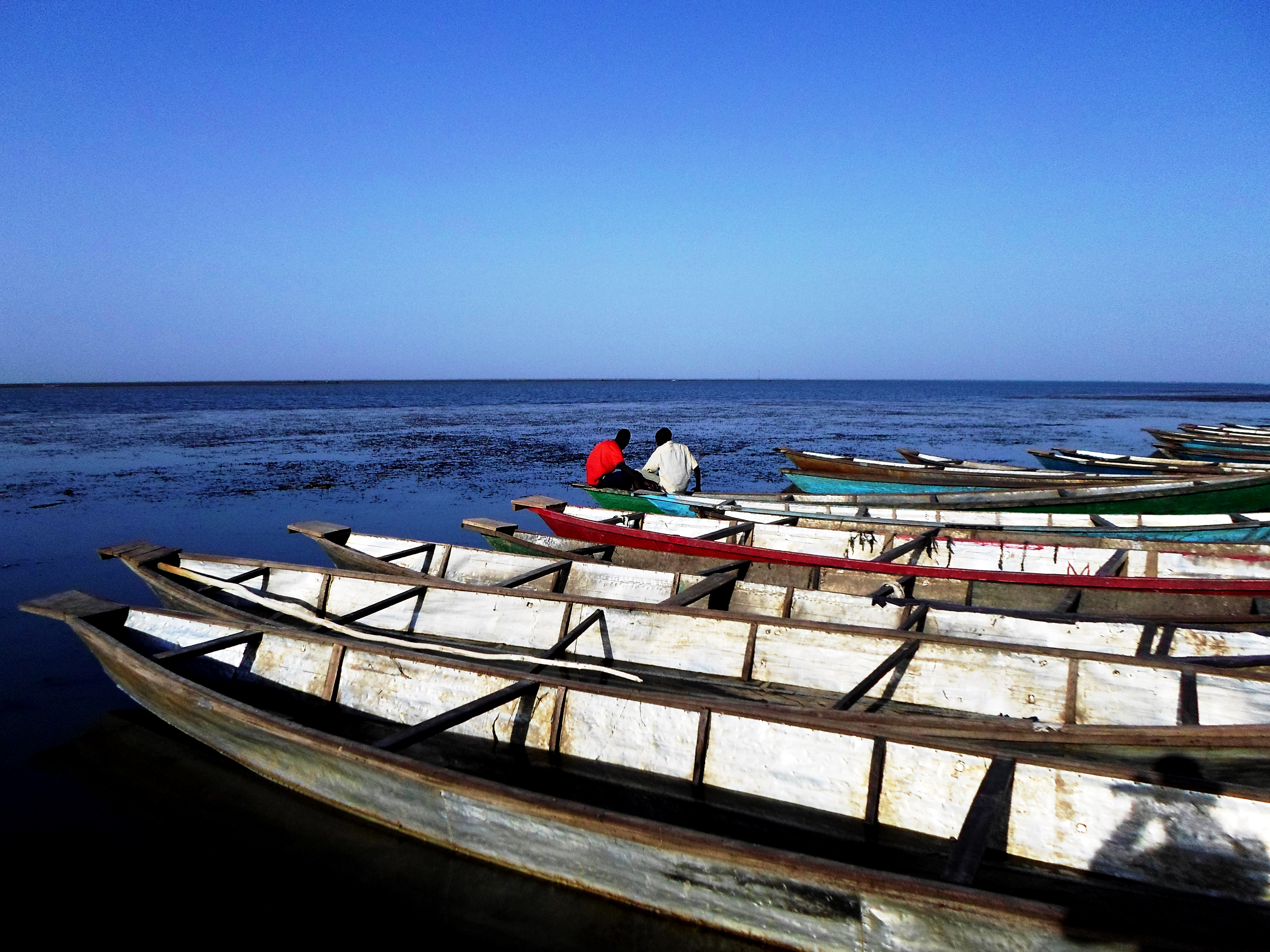
Maga Lake in Mayo-Danay. May 2015.

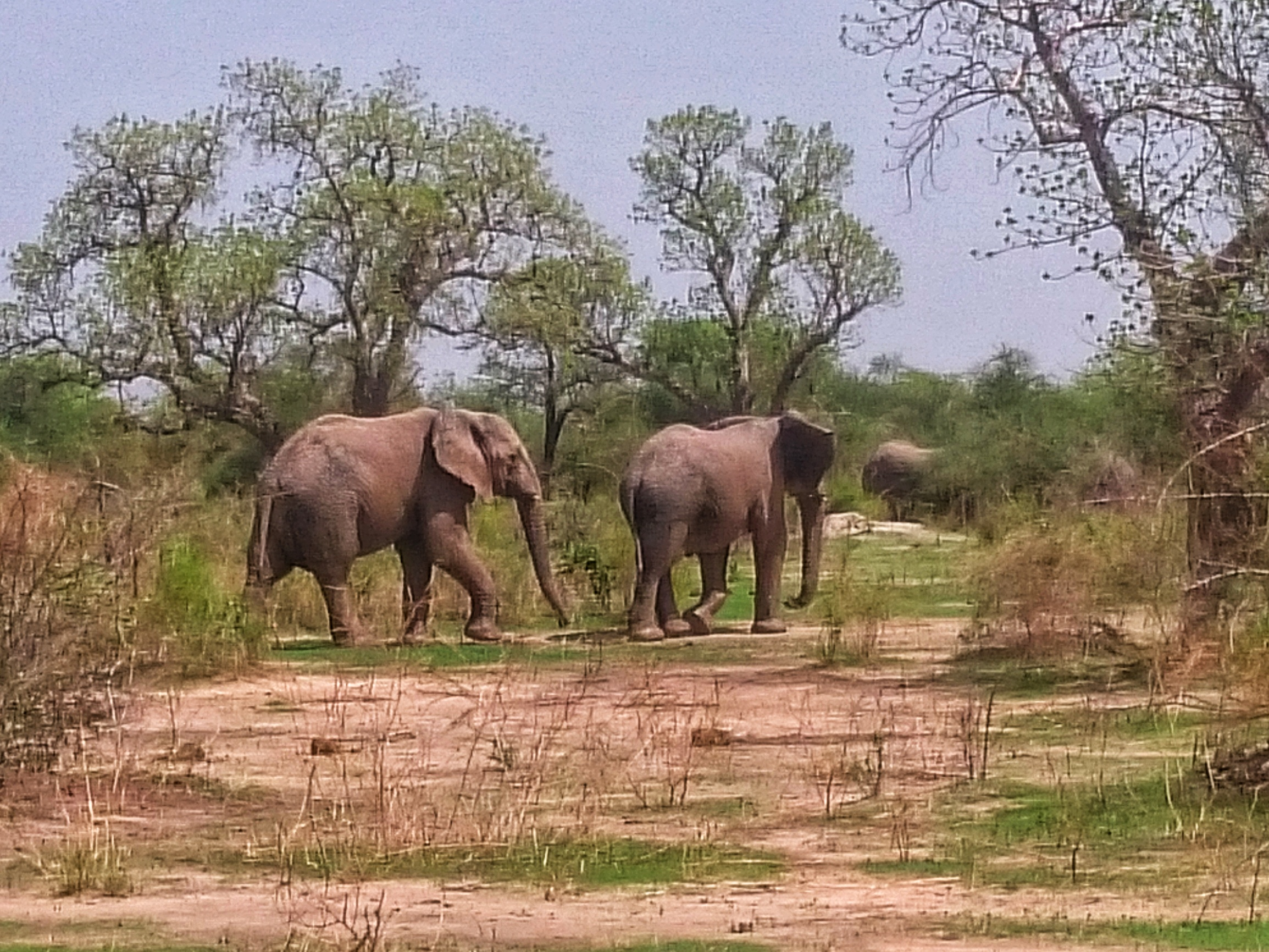
Elephants in the Kalfou wildlife reserve in Mayo-Danay. May 2016.

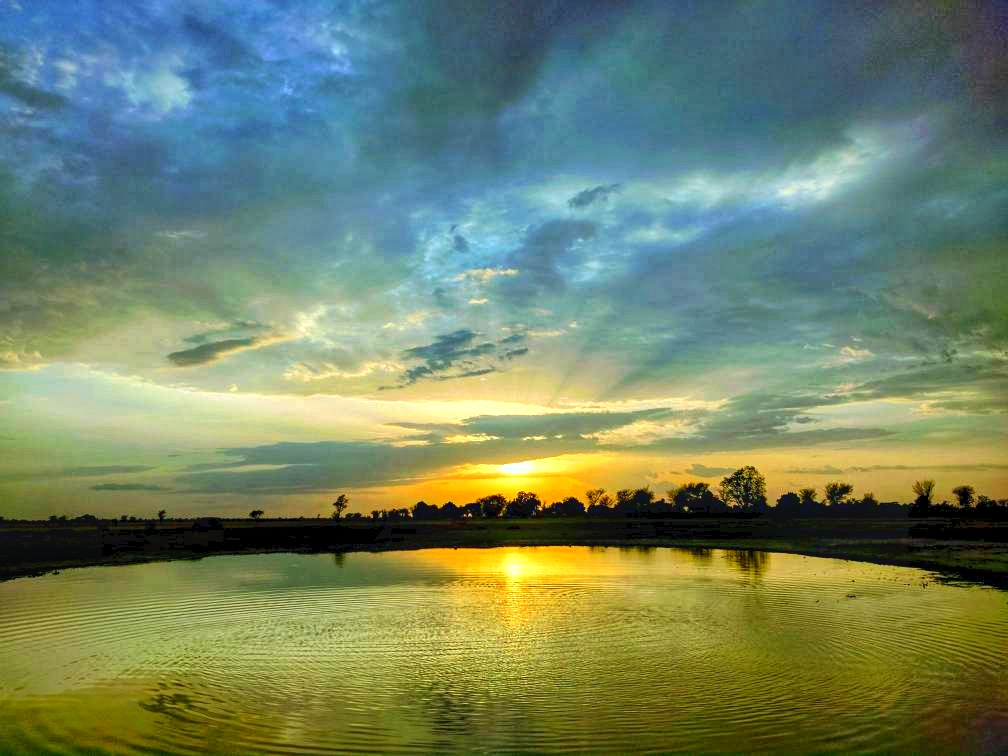
Kalfou sunset

== Subdivisions ==
The department is divided administratively into 11 communes and in turn into villages.

=== Communes ===
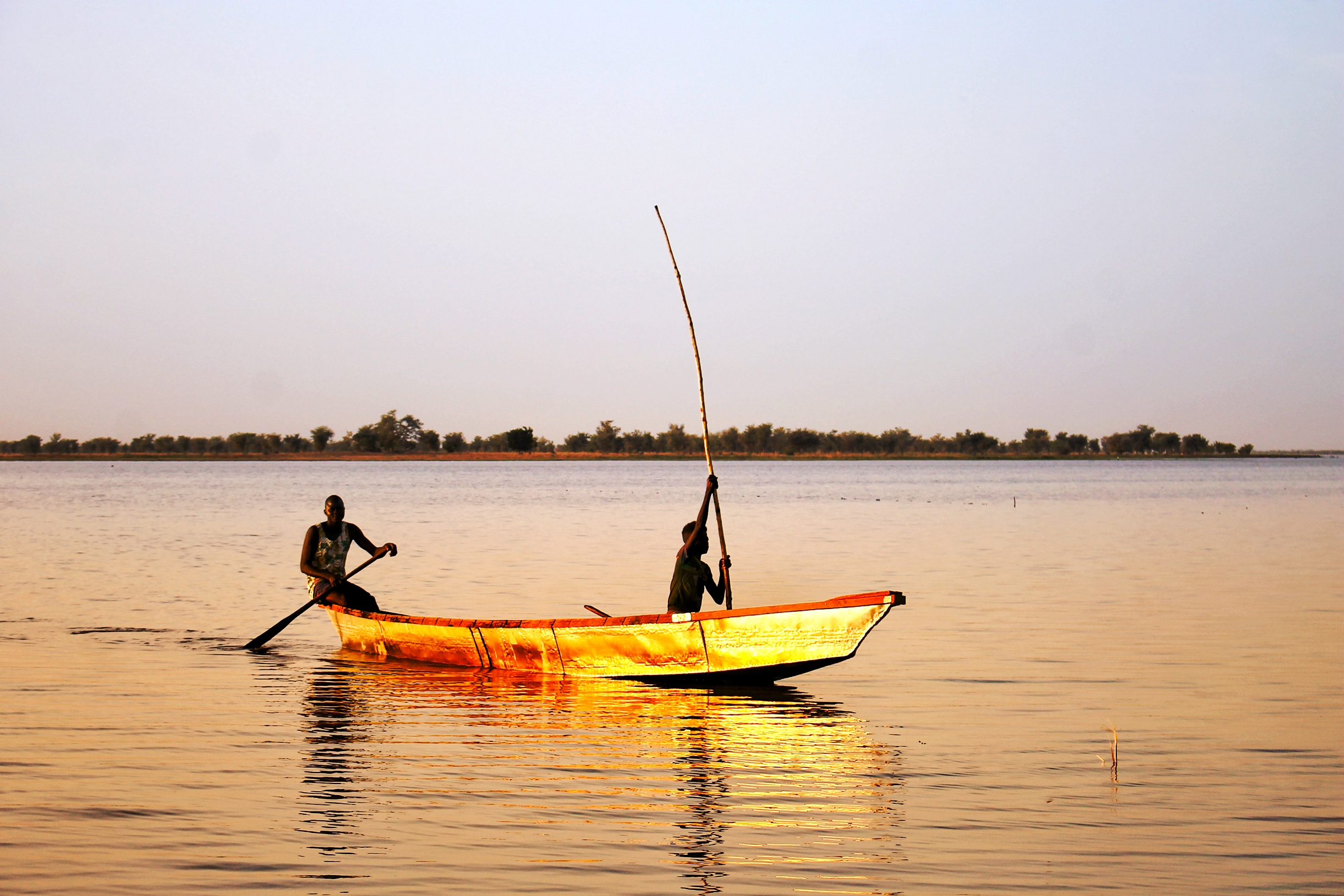
Lake Guere, Mayo Danay Division

1. Datcheka
2. Gobo
3. Gueme
4. Guere
5. Kai-Kai
6. Kalfou
7. Kay-Hay
8. Maga
9. Tchati-Bali
10. Wina
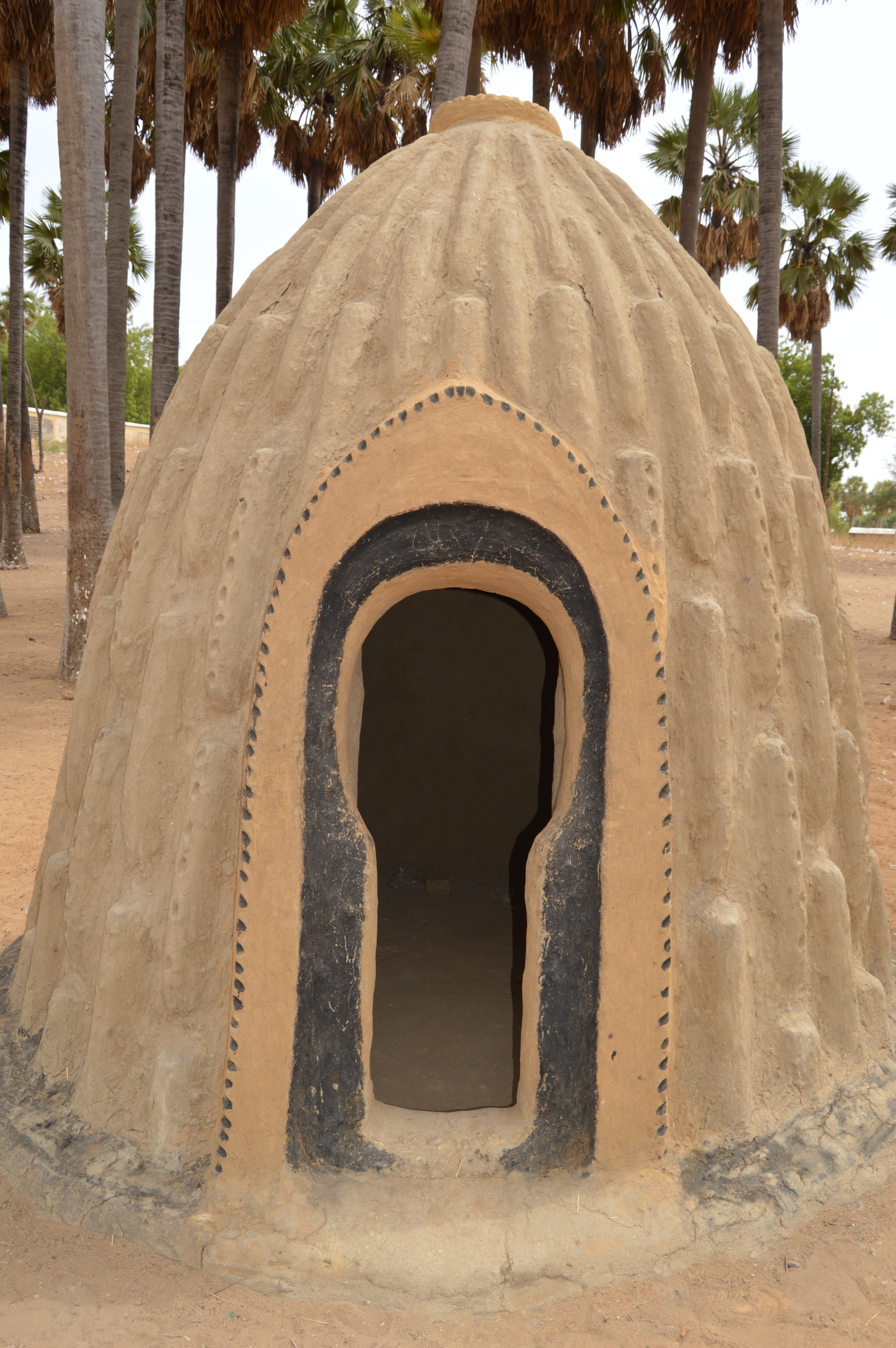
11. Hut in Yagoua
  Yagoua

=== Villages ===
1. Guirvidig
