= Gobo, Cameroon =

Coordinates: 10°01′N 15°26′E

Gobo is a commune in Mayo-Danay Department, Cameroon. In 2005, the population was recorded at 53119.

== See also ==
- Communes of Cameroon
