= Maga, Cameroon =

Maga
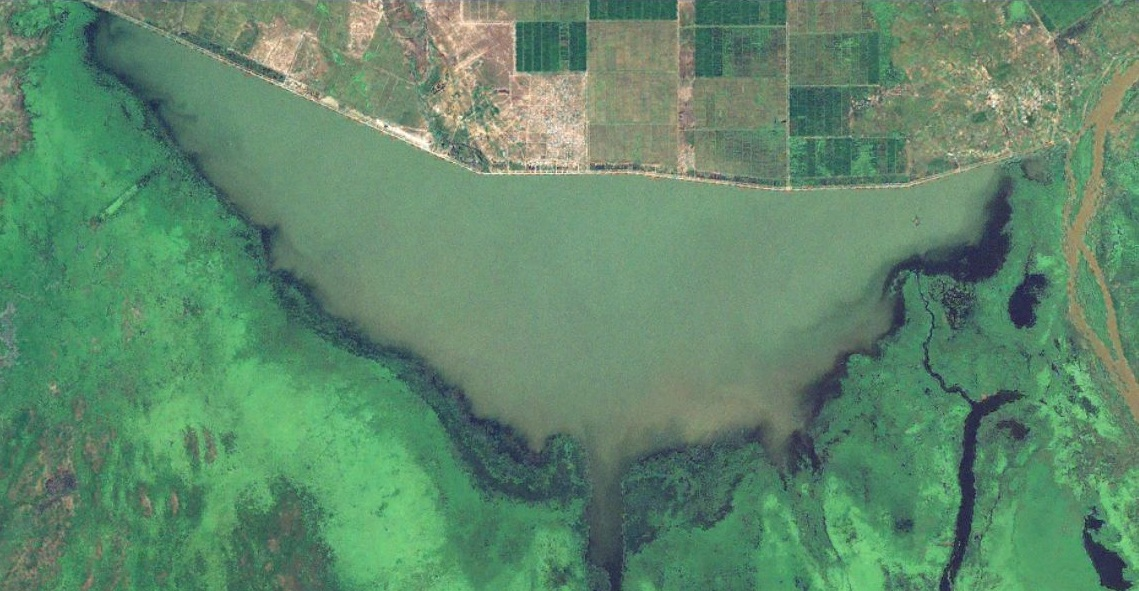
- Maga dam.

- Location in Cameroon
- Coordinates: 10°51′N 14°56′E
- Country: Cameroon
- Province: Far North
- Department: Mayo-Danay
- Elevation: 304 m (997 ft)

Population (2005)(Census)
  - Total: 85,100
- Area code: 00237

Maga is a commune in Mayo-Danay Department, Cameroon. In 2005, the population was recorded at 85100.

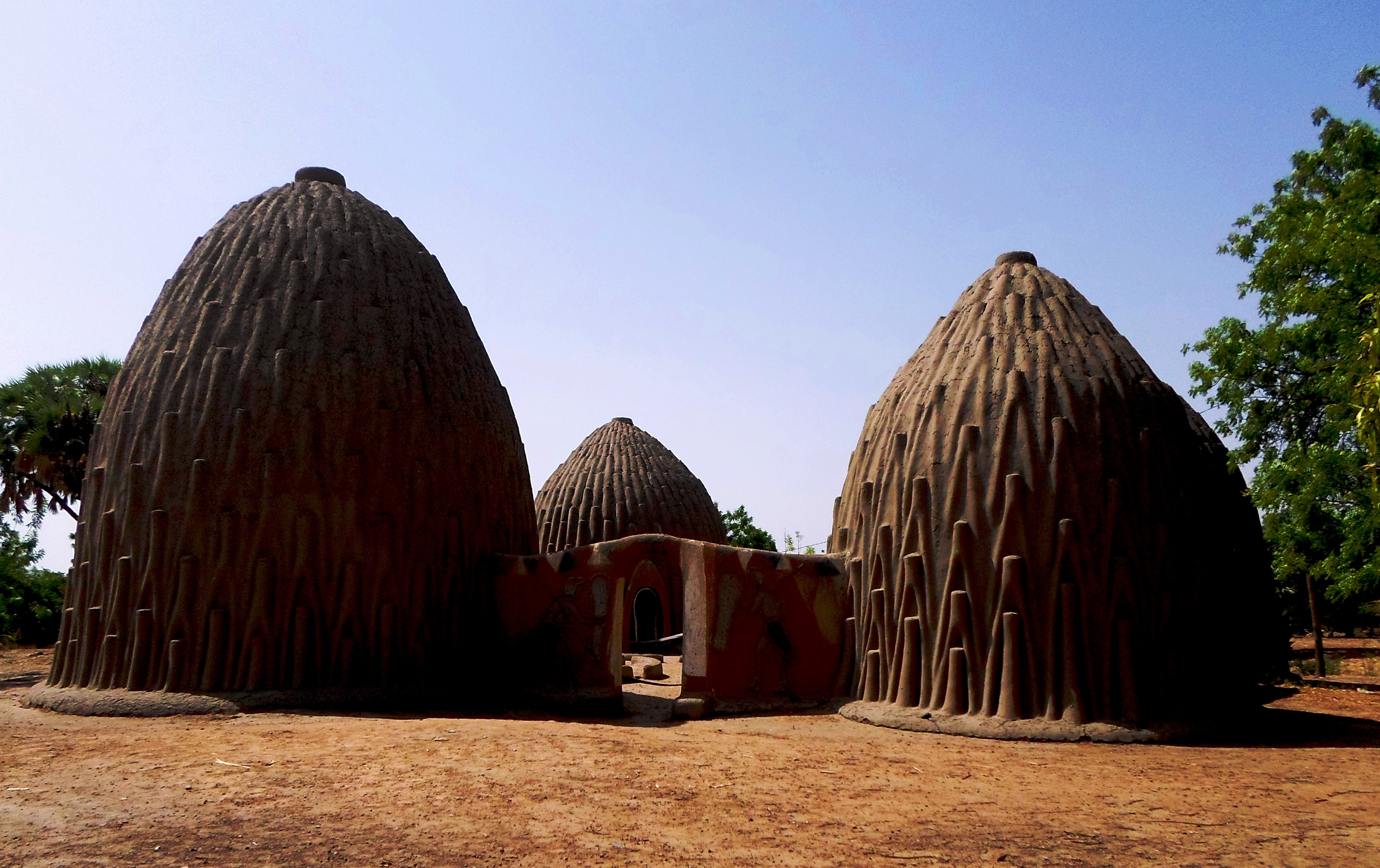
Traditional huts of the Mousgoum people

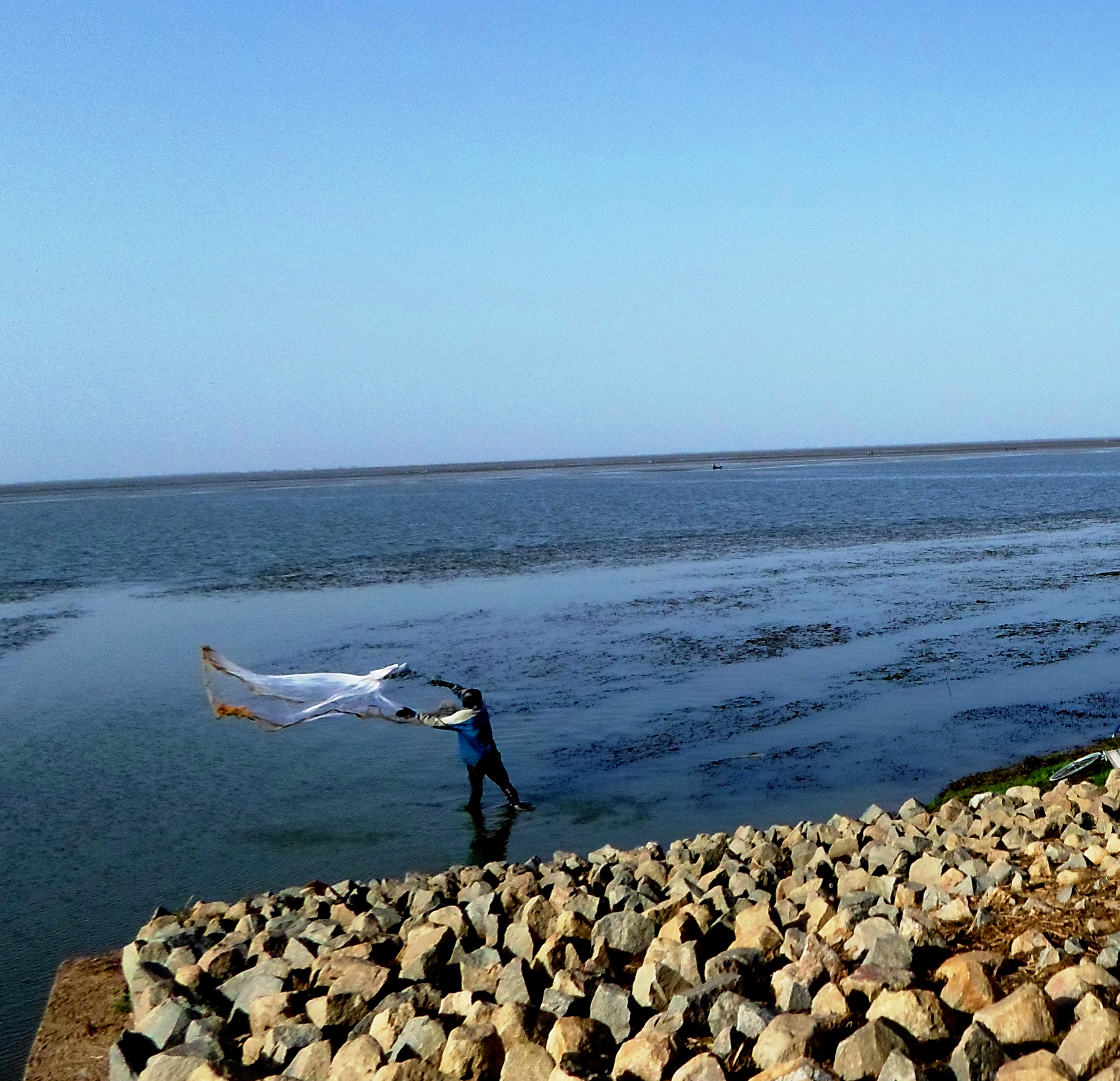
Maga Lake

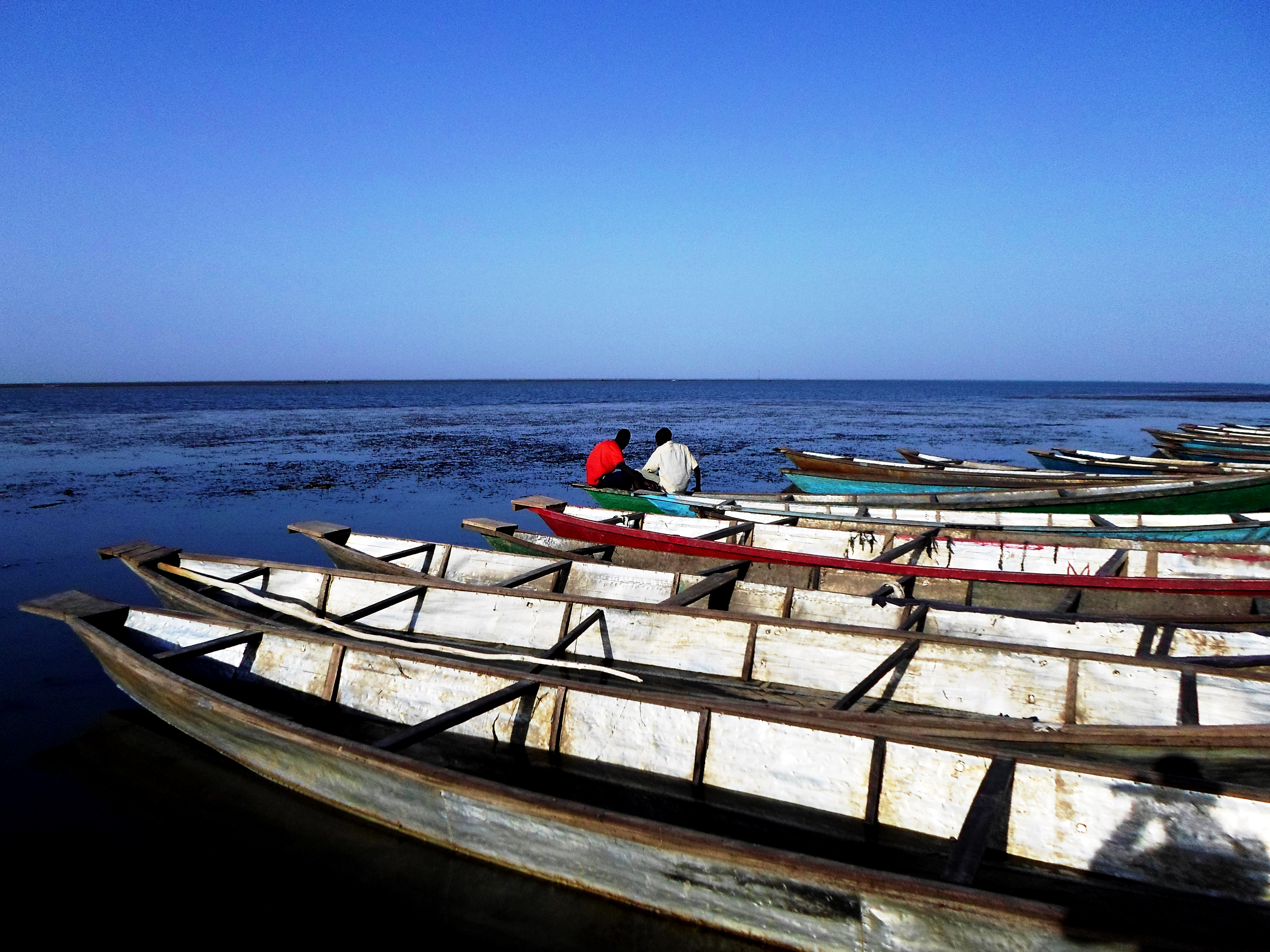
Canoe in Maga Lake

== Gallery ==
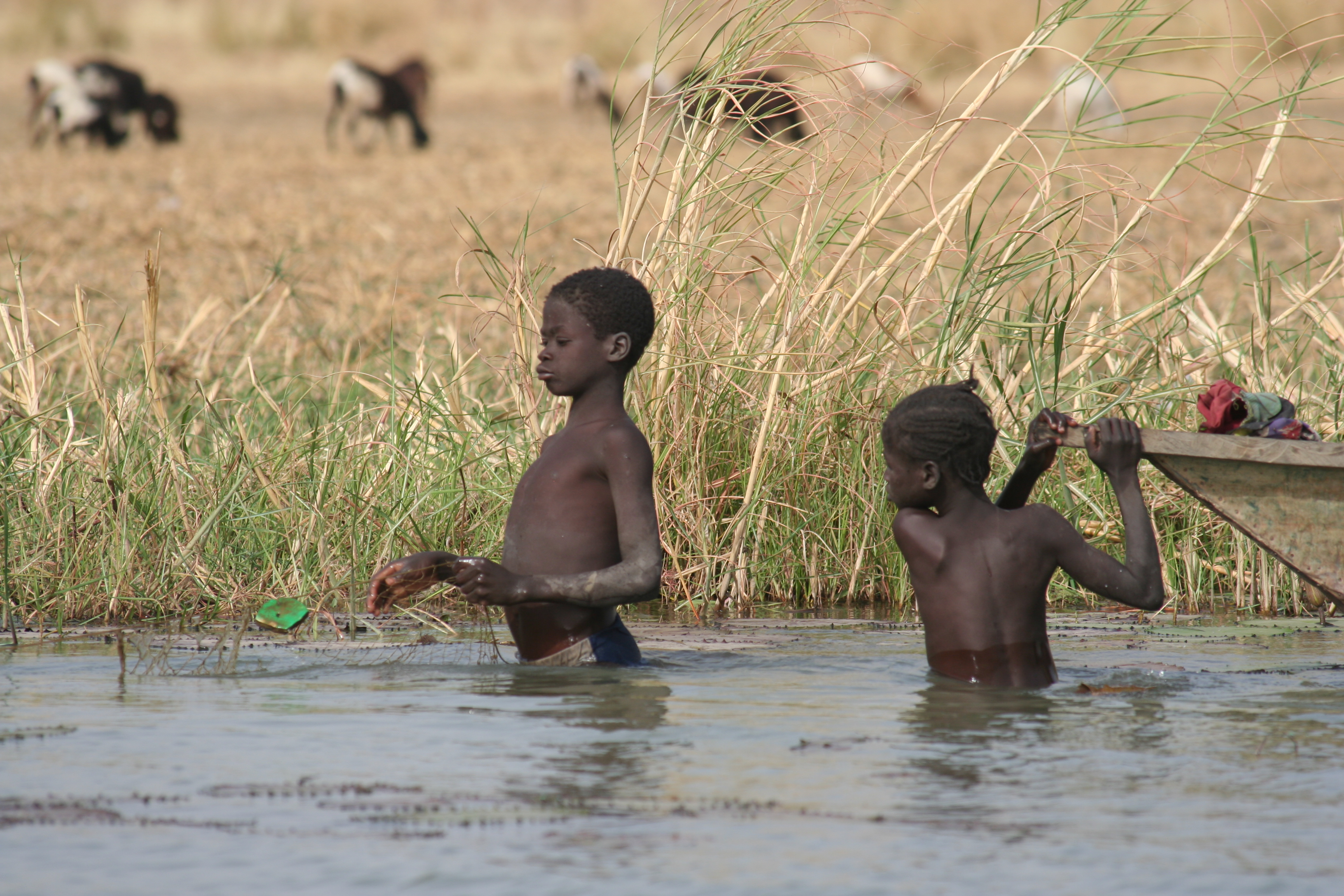
Children fishing in Lake Maga.

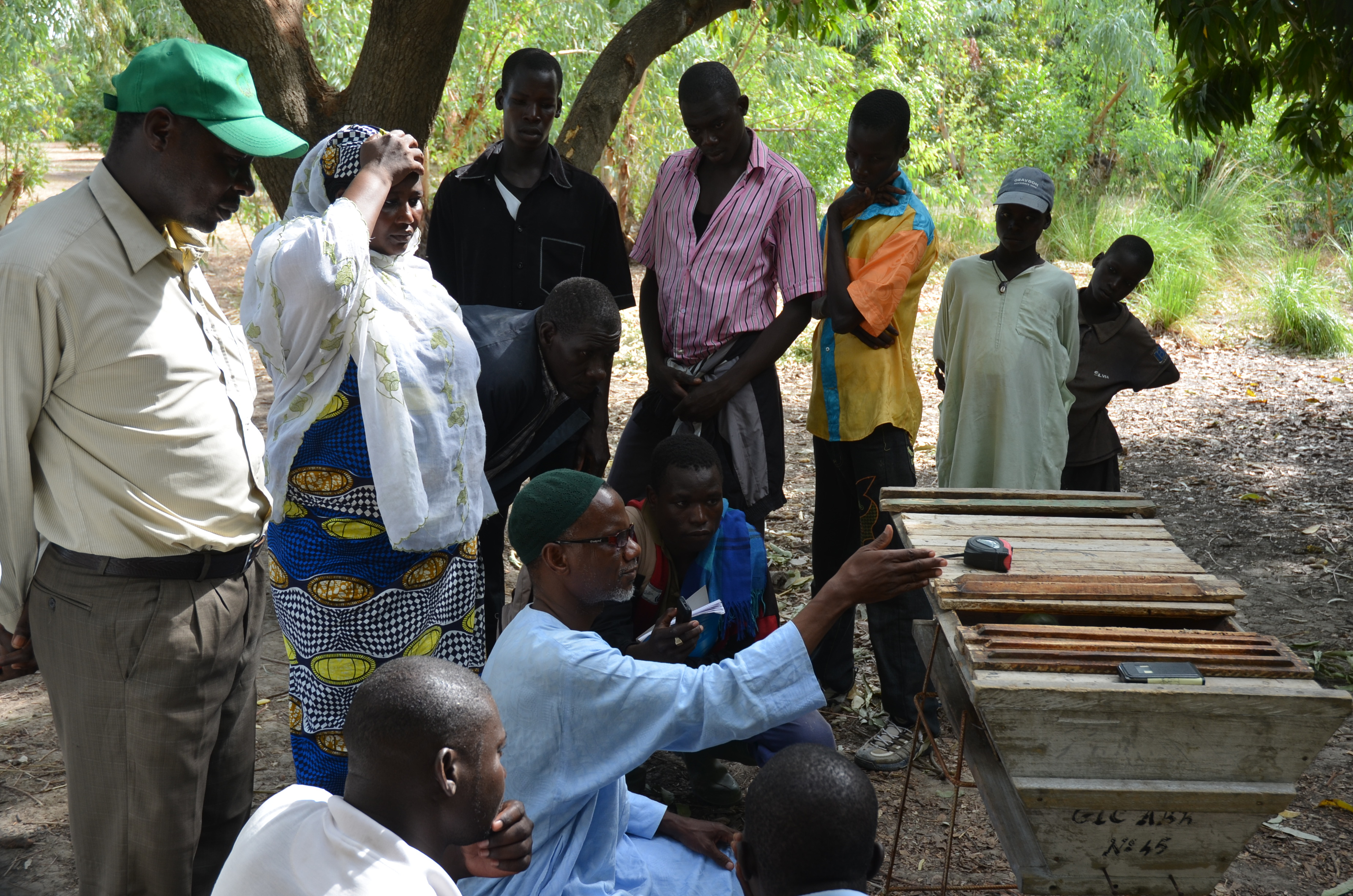
Beekeeping training.

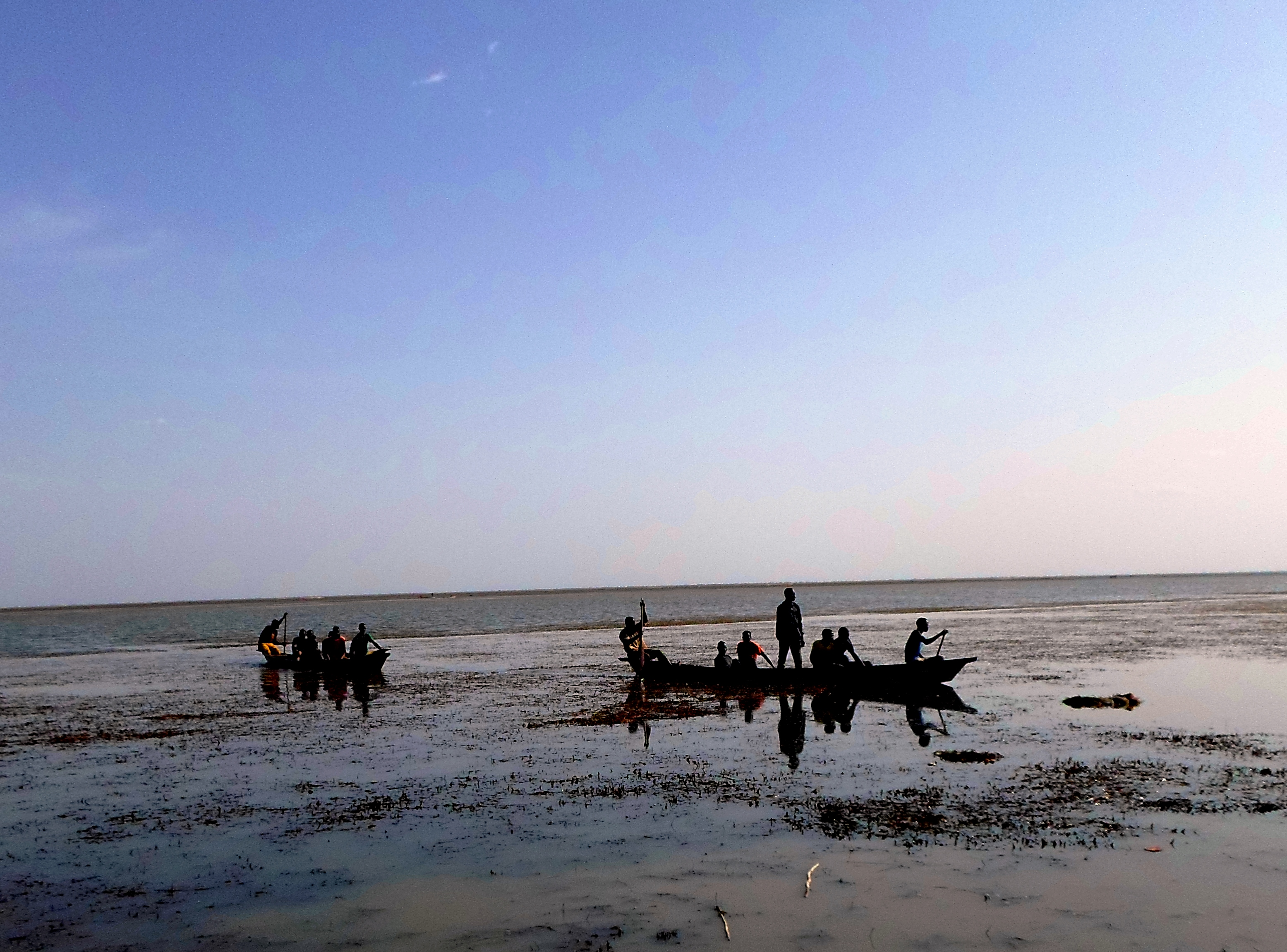
Return from fishing.

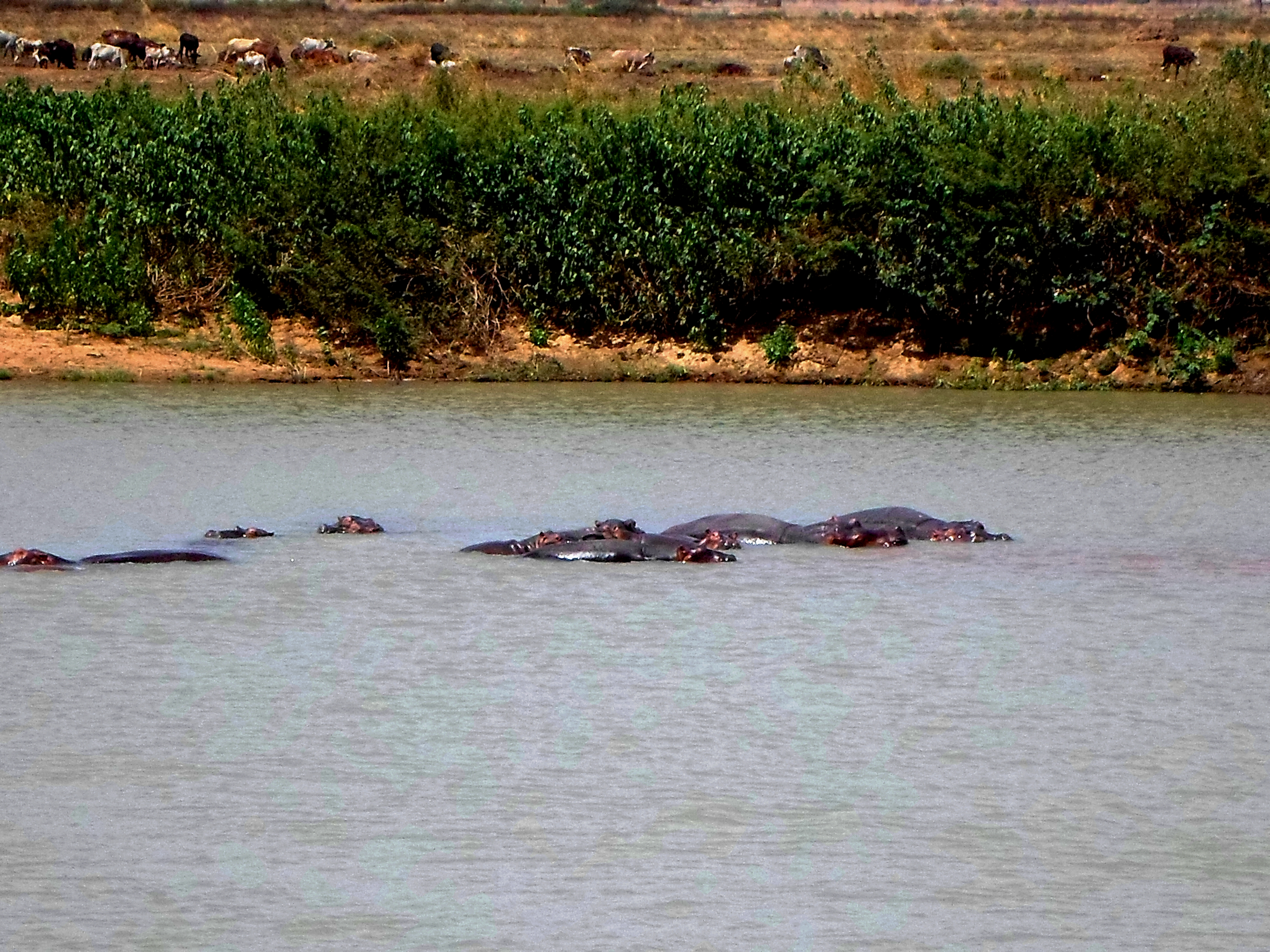
Hippopotamuses in Lake Maga.
