= Tupuri people =

Tupuri
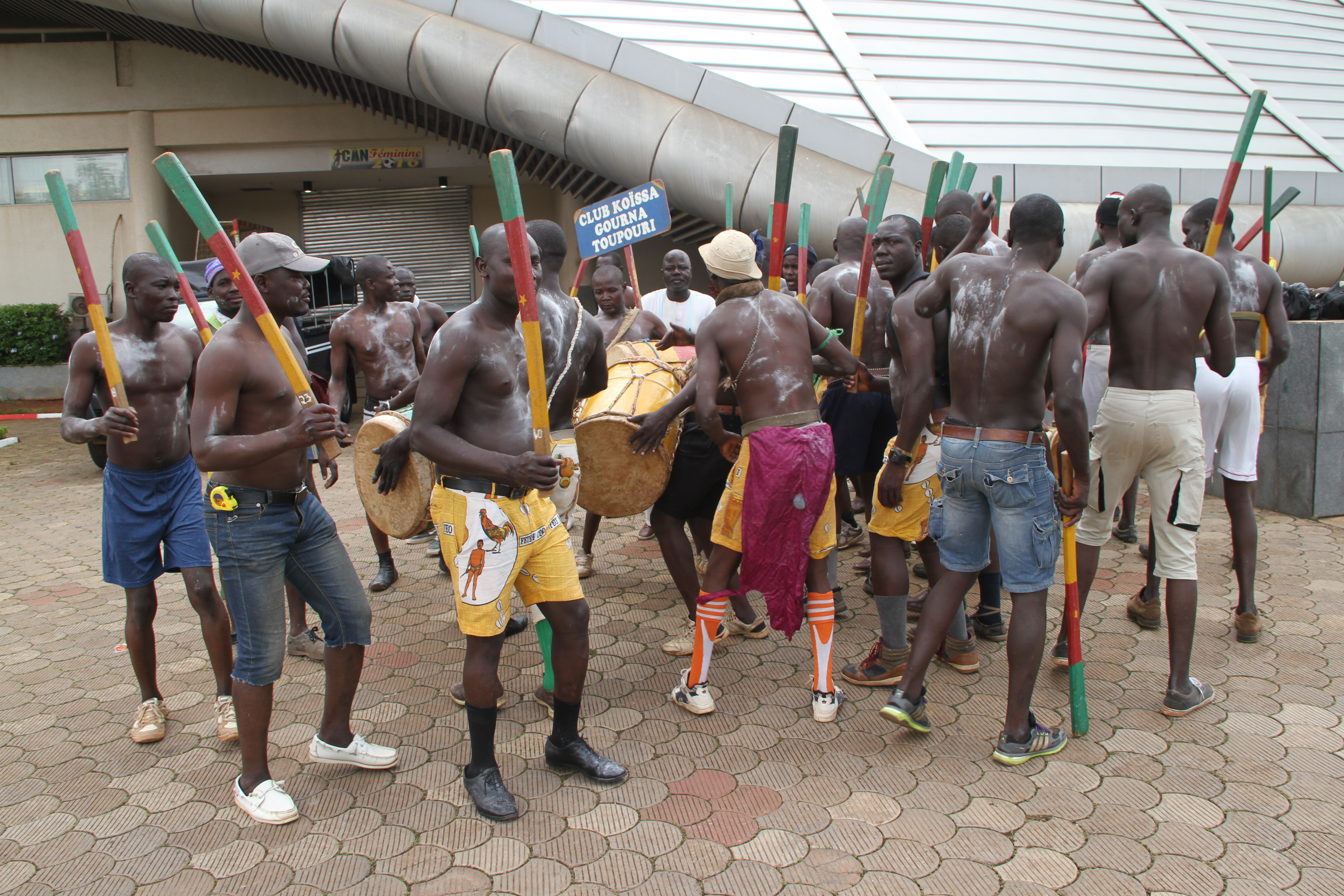
- Tupuri dance group

Regions with significant populations
- Cameroon and Chad
- Chad: 215,466
- Cameroon: 125,000

Languages
- Tupuri • Arabic • French

Religion
- Christianity • Traditional

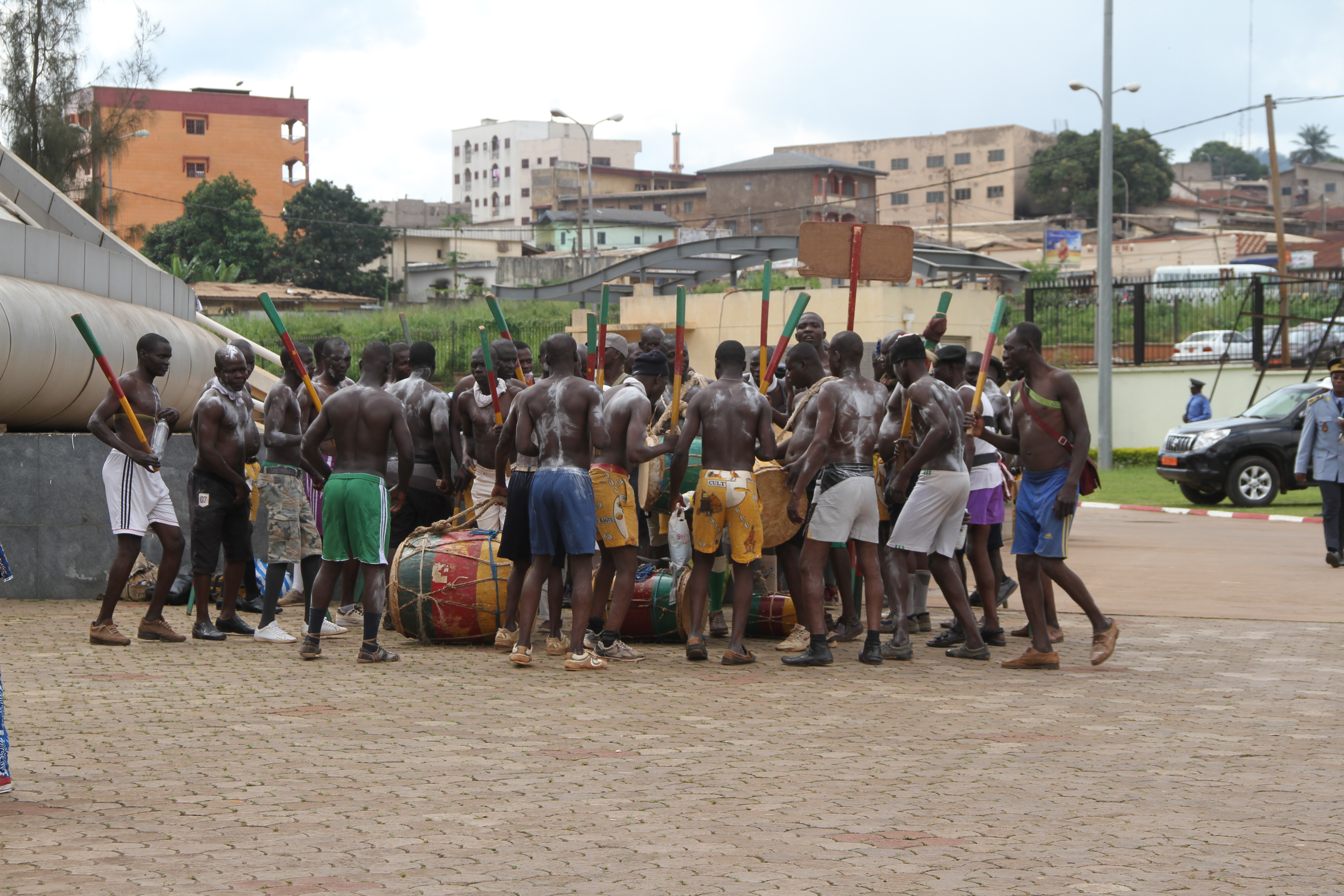
Tupuri dance group

The Tupuri are an ethnic group in Cameroon and Chad. They speak a language called Tupuri, which had 125,000 speakers in Cameroon at an unspecified date and 90,785 speakers in Chad in 1993. There were 215,466 Tupuri in Chad in 2009.

== Population ==
Globally there are approximately 600,000 Tupuri, mostly split between Cameroon and Chad.

== Geographic range ==
In Cameroon, the Tupuri live east of Kaélé in the Kaele division and in the Kar-Hay subdivision of the Mayo-Danay division of the Far North Province.

In Chad, Tupuri live near Fianga, Fianga Subprefecture, Mayo-Kebbi Prefecture in the southwest of the country. They arrived in that area after fleeing from the lowlands to avoid Fulbe slave traders.

== Culture ==
Tulpuri culture is based around fishing, raising cattle, and millet and sorghum farming. The millet and sorghum crops are farmed in terraced fields cut into hillsides.

The Tupuri are also known as poultry farmers, trading chicken with other tribes such as the Guidar. They have a traditional dance called the gourna, "the dance of the cock", which involves the dancers forming a circle and holding long sticks, and celebrate a chicken festival.

The Tupuri political and religious life is headed by the Wang Doré, the traditional Kings of Doré, who are based in the village of Doré near Fianga, Chad. A secondary political and religious pole is the chief of the village of Ganhou.

In October, Tupuri lineages claiming descent from the mythical ancestor Dore, participate in the chicken festival officiated by the chief of Dore. Meanwhile, in March, Tupuri lineages claiming descent from the mythical ancestor Gouwa celebrate the festival of Méné. This March festival is officiated by the chief of Ganhou.

The predominant religion of the Tupuri is animism.
