= Wina, Cameroon =

Commune of Cameroon

Coordinates: 10°09′N 15°13′E

Wina is a commune in Mayo-Danay Department, Cameroon. In 2005, the population was recorded at 30702.
