= Wang Doré =

Chief religious and political figure of the Tupuri people

The Wang Doré or Wang Kulu is the chief religious and political figure of the Tupuri people. Based in the village of Doré near the Chadian town of Fianga, the Wang Doré have traditionally acted as the kings of the Tupuri, with the areas under their suzerainty being known as the Kingdom of Doré. Today, he still holds religious and political power over the Tupuri living across the borders of Chad and Cameroon.
