= Yagoua =

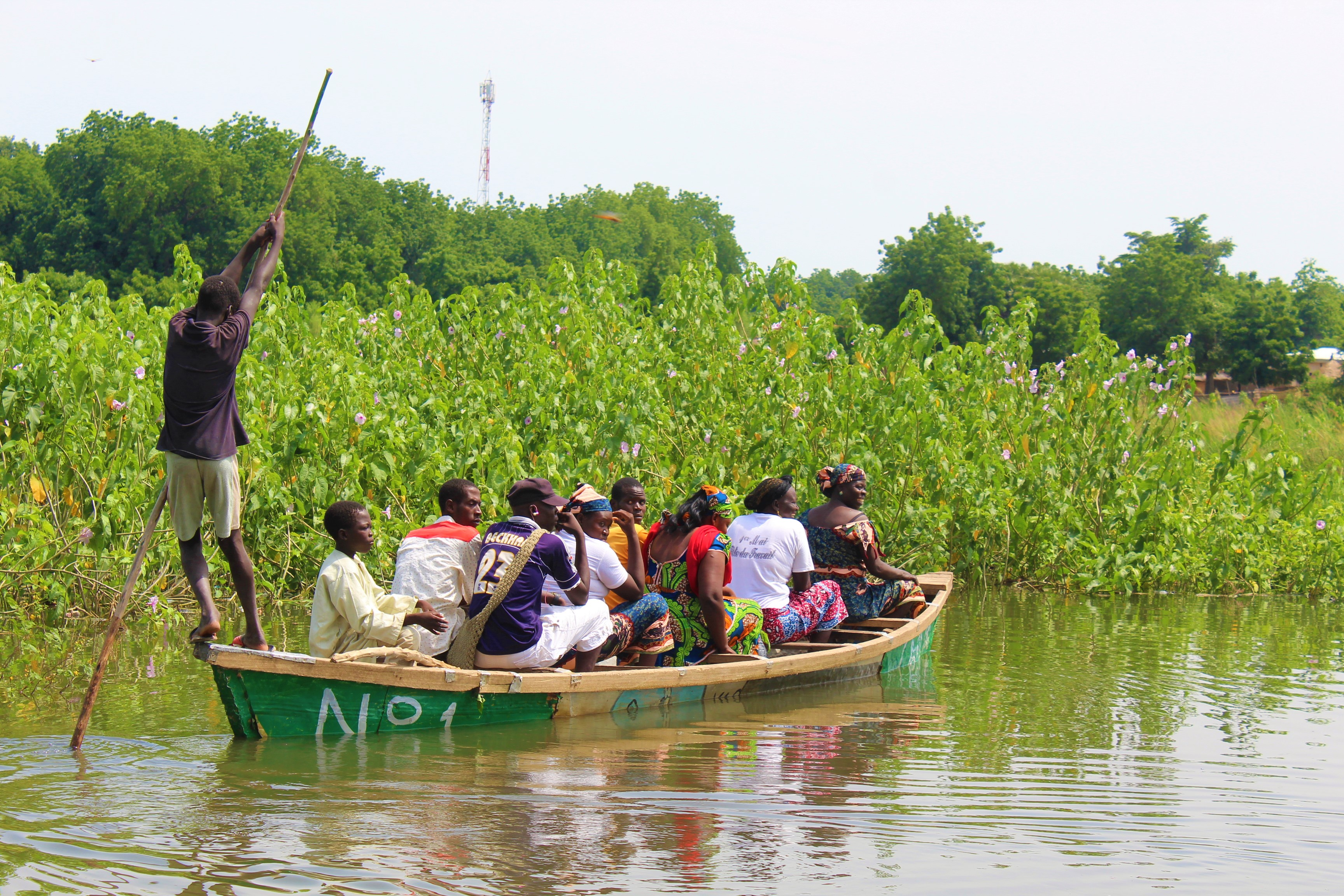
- Paddler at Yagoua

- Location in Cameroon
- Coordinates: 10°20′34″N 15°14′26″E
- Country: Cameroon
- Province: Far North (Extrême-Nord)
- Department: Mayo-Danay
- Elevation: 356 m (1,168 ft)

Population (2012)
  - Total: 41,957

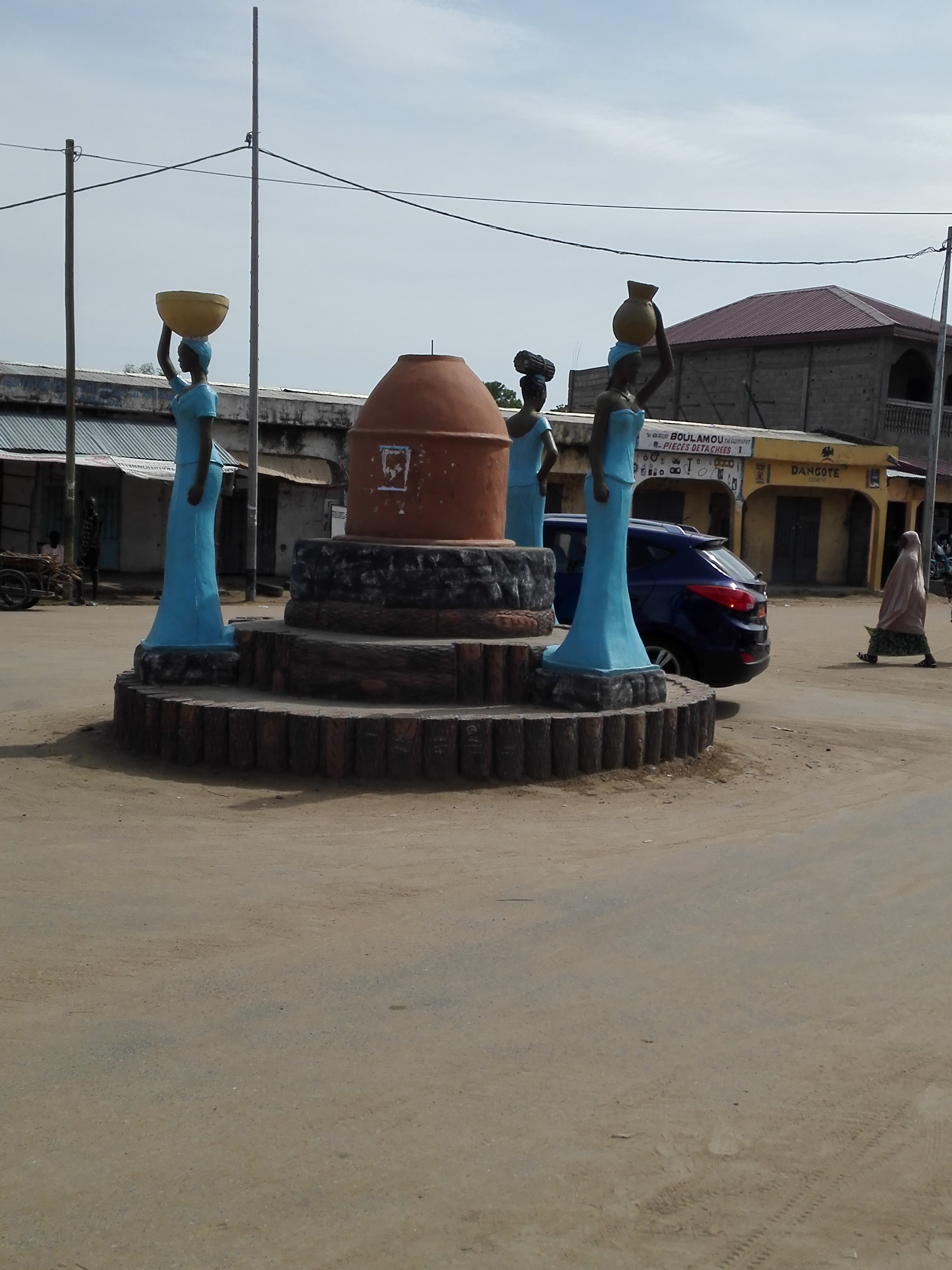
Carrefour Total Yagoua

Yagoua is a town and commune in the Far North Province of Cameroon. It is the capital of the department of Mayo-Danay.

== Administrative structure ==
Localities are:

- Bagarao
- Dana
- Danay Diguizi
- Déhé I
- Déhé II
- Djokoydi
- Domo
- Hounou
- Kalak
- Kirsidi
- Masgaya
- Miogoye I
- Miogoye II
- Mouri I
- Mouri II
- Ngaya
- Tcherféké
- Toukou
- Vormounoun
- Vounaloum
- Yrdeng
- Zébé I
- Zébé II
- Zébé Marao
- Zoulla

== Climate ==
Yagoua has a hot semi-arid climate (BSh) with little to no rain from October to April and moderate to heavy rainfall from May to September.

Climate data for Yagoua
Month	Jan	Feb	Mar	Apr	May	Jun	Jul	Aug	Sep	Oct	Nov	Dec	Year
Mean daily maximum °C (°F)	34.1 (93.4)	36.3 (97.3)	39.1 (102.4)	39.2 (102.6)	36.7 (98.1)	33.8 (92.8)	31.3 (88.3)	30.2 (86.4)	31.5 (88.7)	34.5 (94.1)	36.5 (97.7)	34.9 (94.8)	34.8 (94.7)
Daily mean °C (°F)	25.8 (78.4)	27.7 (81.9)	31.0 (87.8)	32.0 (89.6)	30.3 (86.5)	28.3 (82.9)	26.6 (79.9)	25.9 (78.6)	26.5 (79.7)	28.0 (82.4)	28.0 (82.4)	26.2 (79.2)	28.0 (82.4)
Mean daily minimum °C (°F)	17.5 (63.5)	19.2 (66.6)	23.0 (73.4)	24.9 (76.8)	23.9 (75.0)	22.8 (73.0)	21.9 (71.4)	21.6 (70.9)	21.5 (70.7)	21.5 (70.7)	19.6 (67.3)	17.5 (63.5)	21.2 (70.2)
Average rainfall mm (inches)	0 (0)	0 (0)	1 (0.0)	17 (0.7)	63 (2.5)	109 (4.3)	187 (7.4)	235 (9.3)	133 (5.2)	24 (0.9)	1 (0.0)	0 (0)	770 (30.3)
Source: Climate-Data.org

== Gallery ==
Village with shell huts

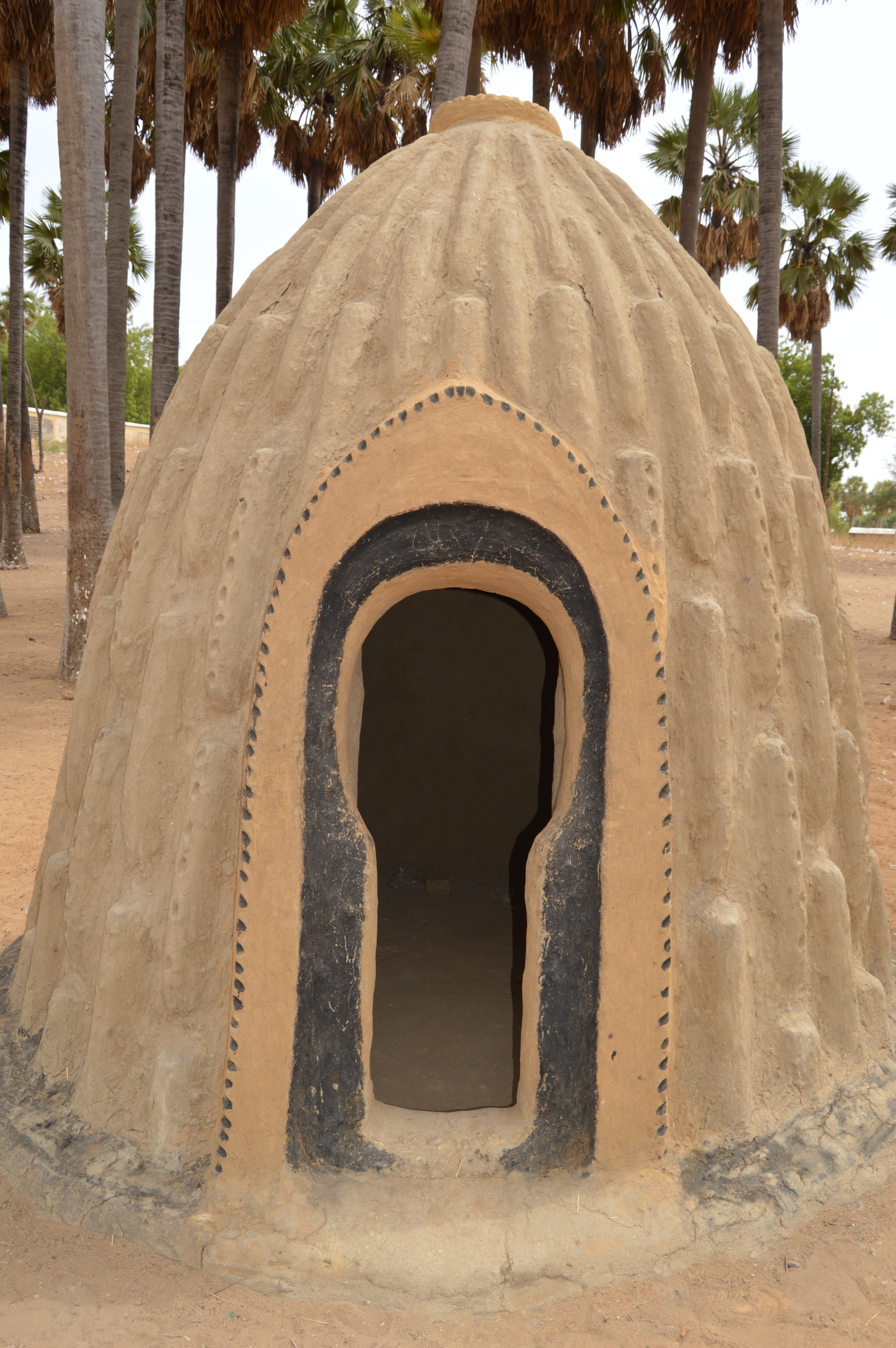

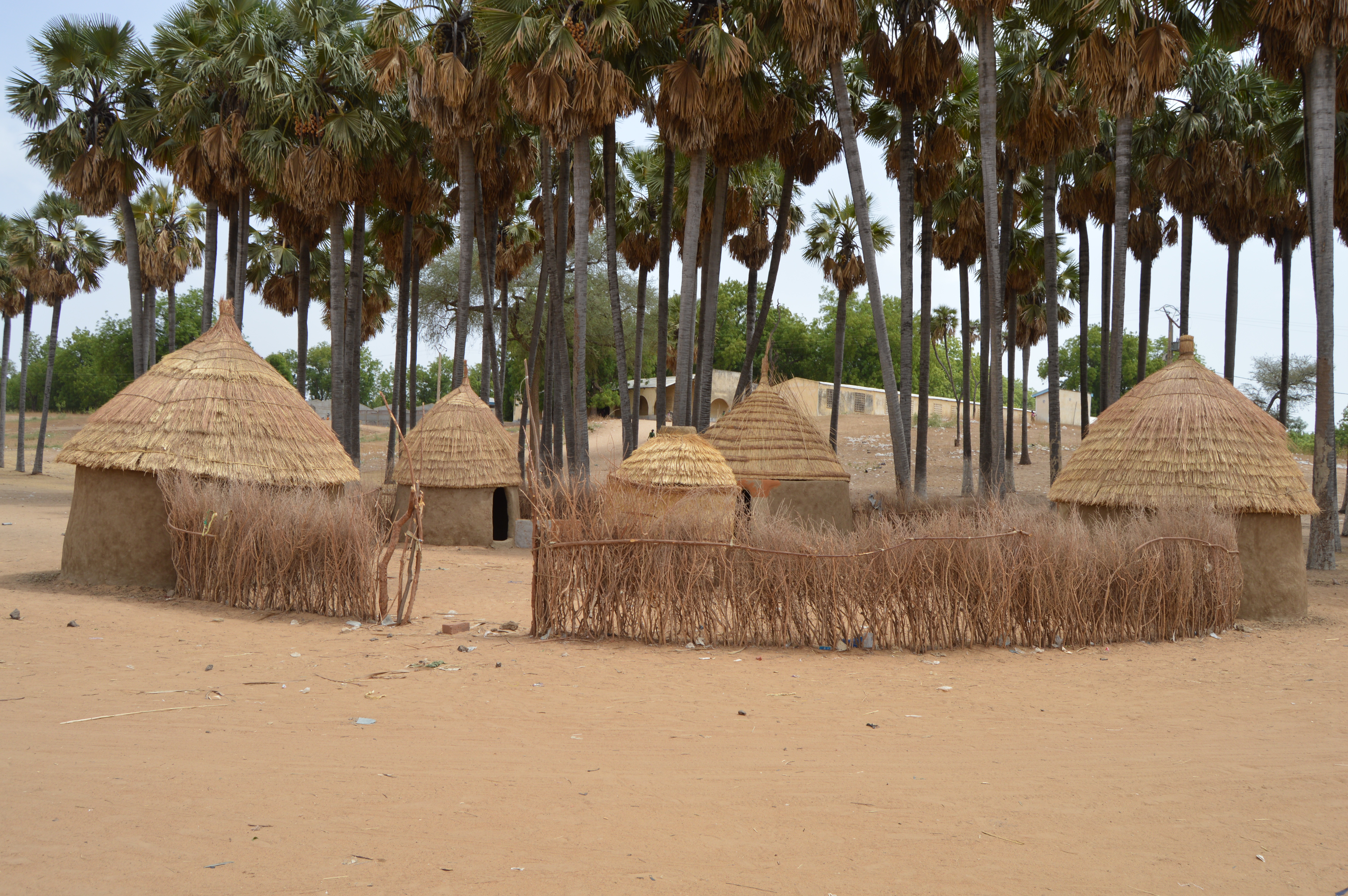
Life at Yagoua

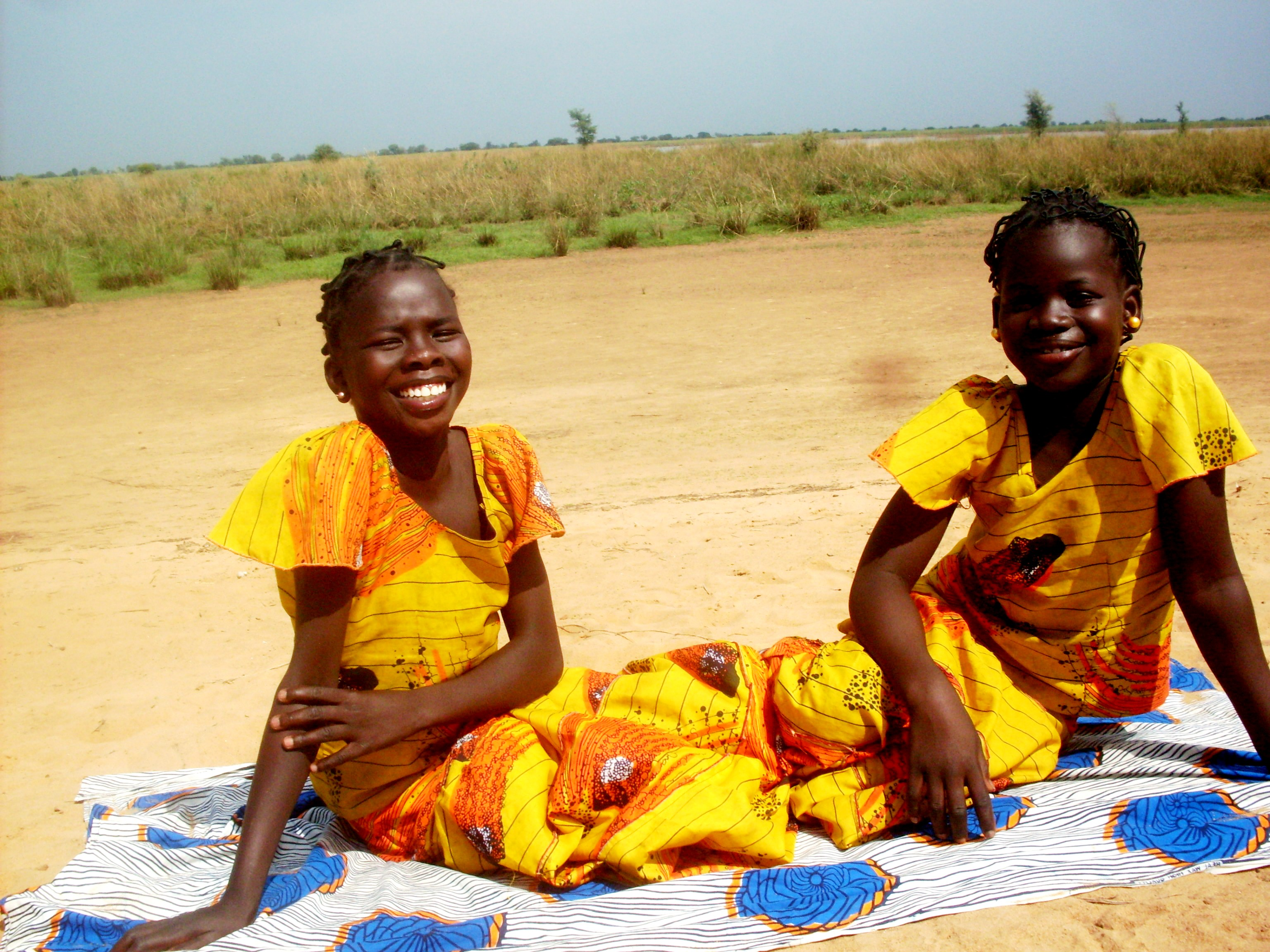
Young girl at Yagoua

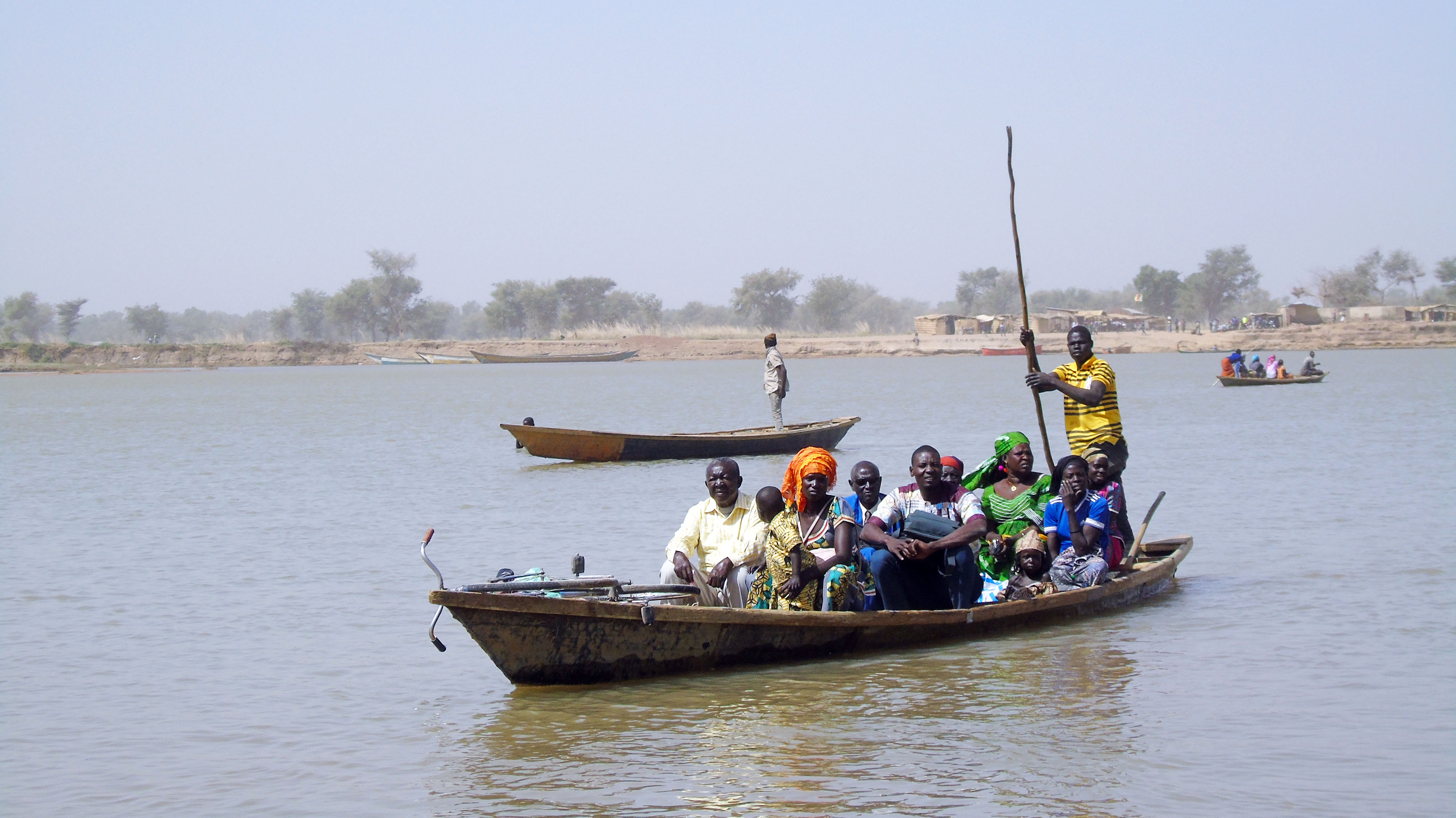
Canoe transport

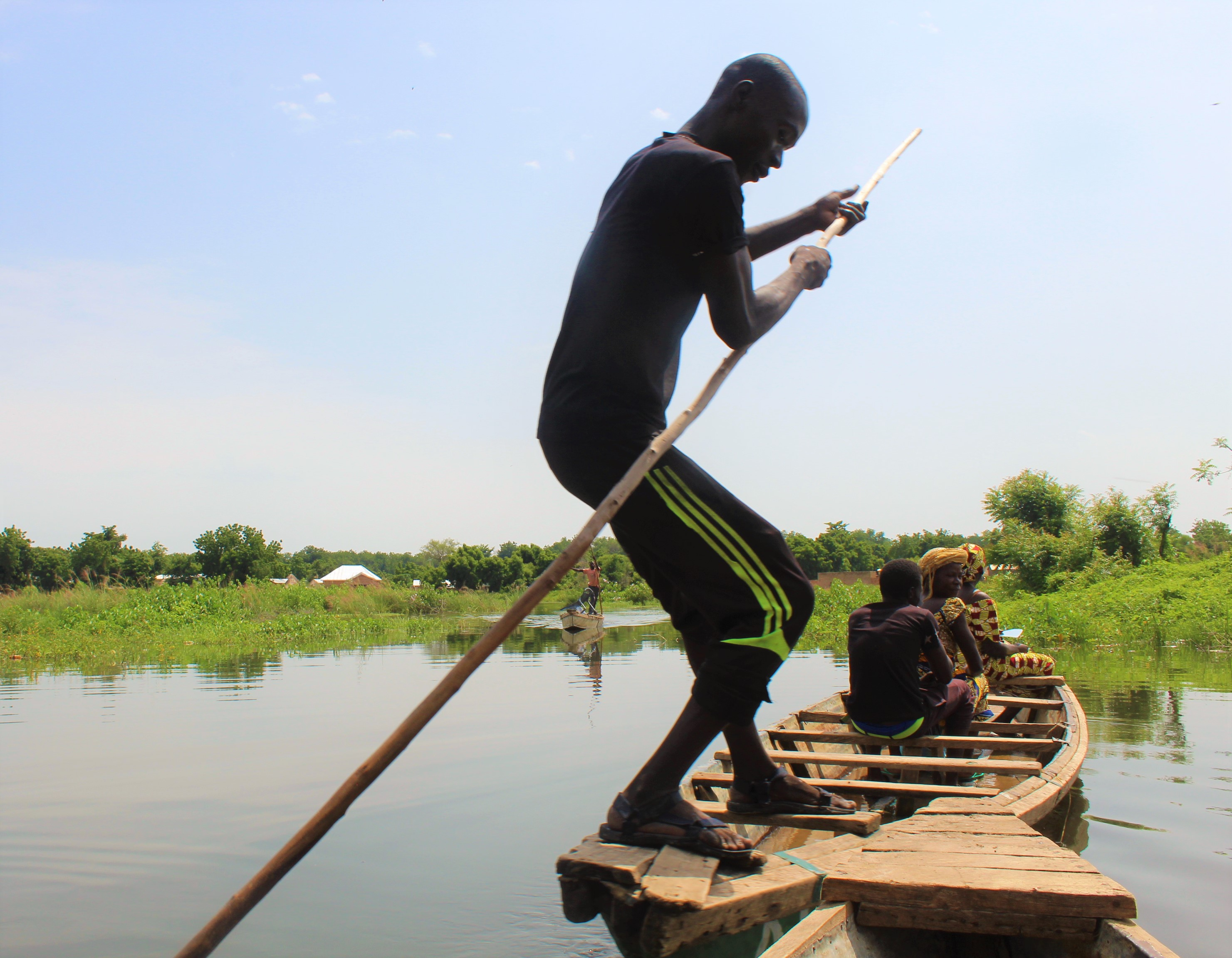
Paddling profession

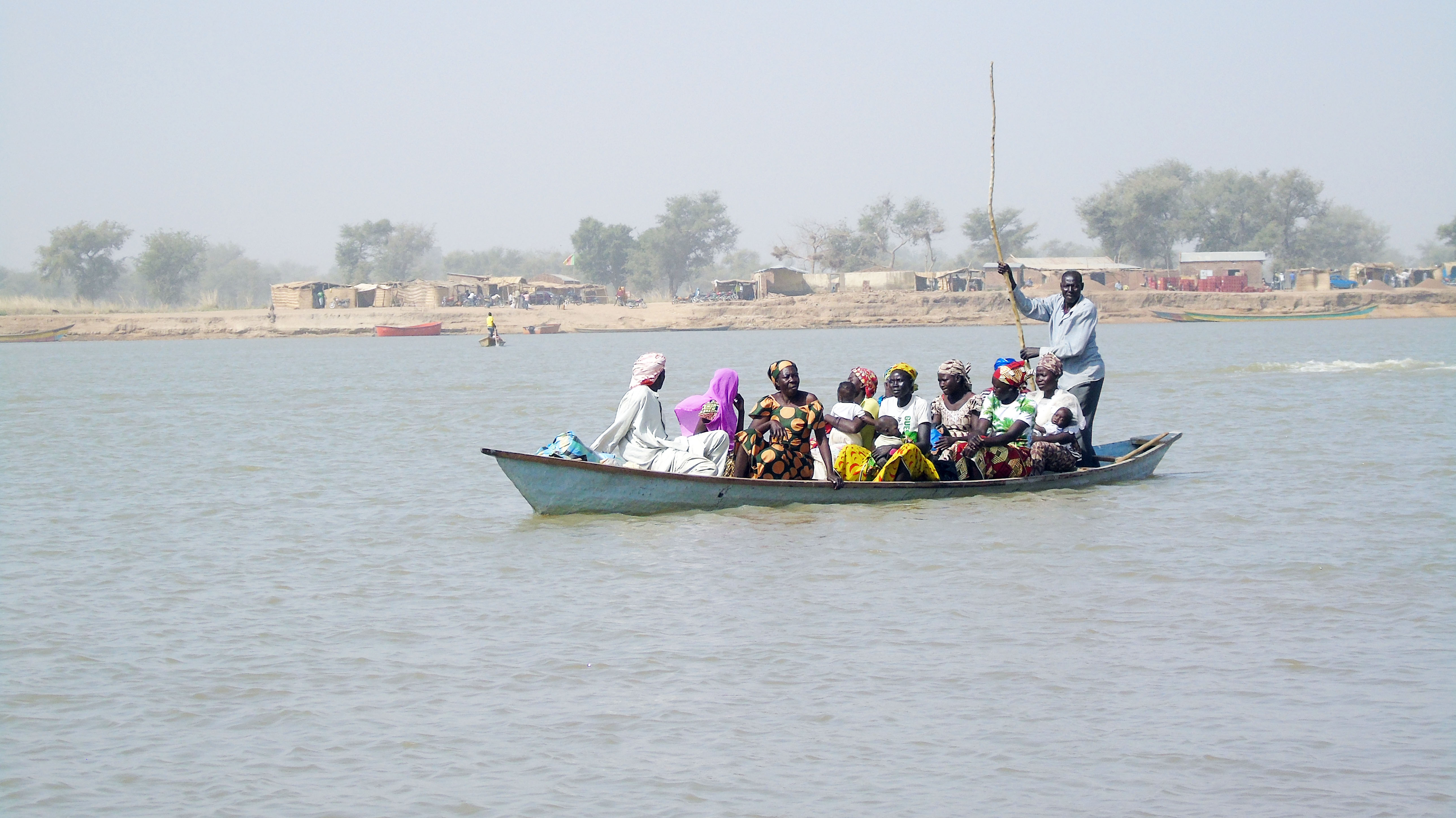
Canoe crossing

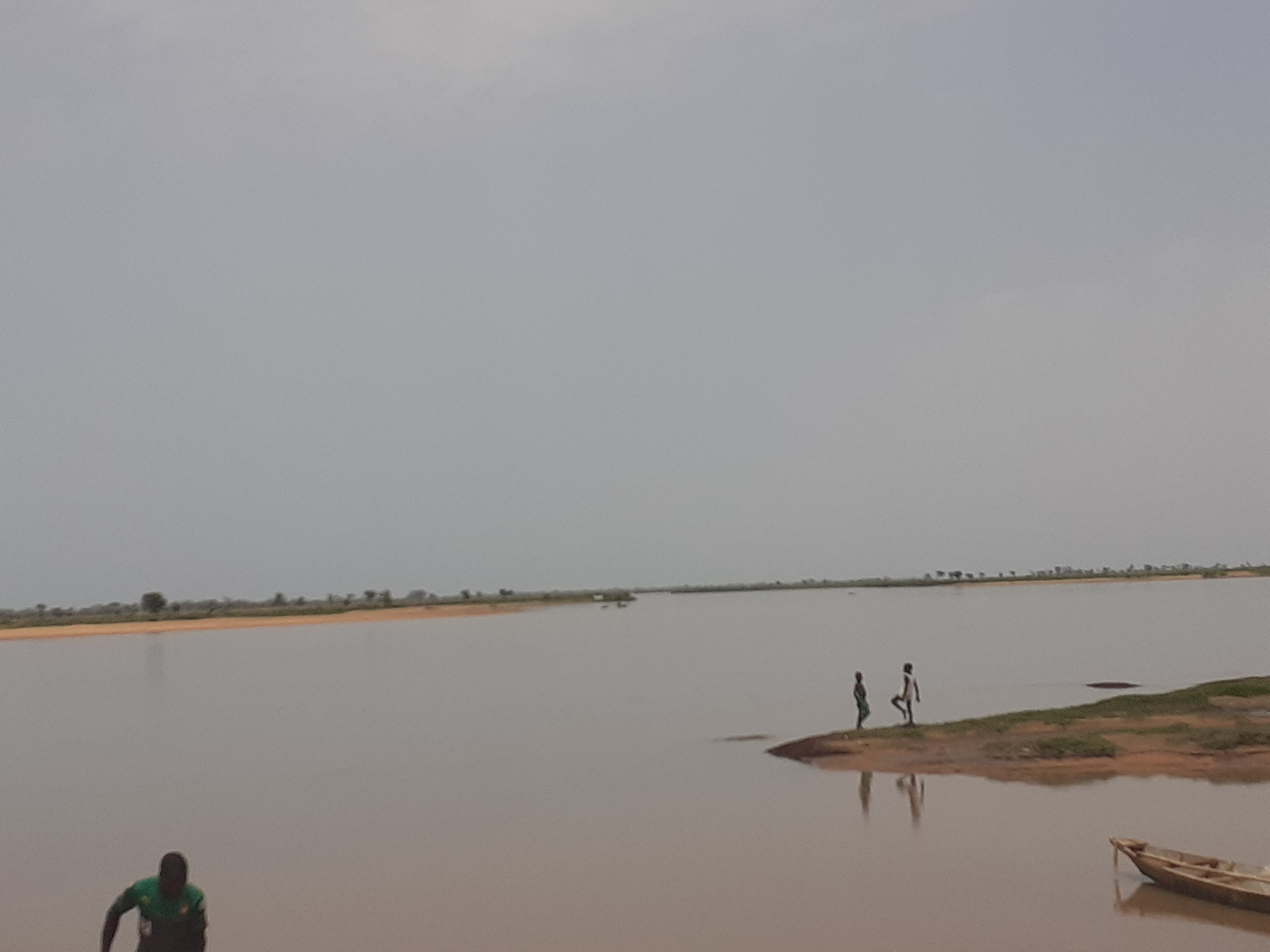
Fishermen in Zébé Marao Cameroon
