= Guere, Cameroon =

Guere
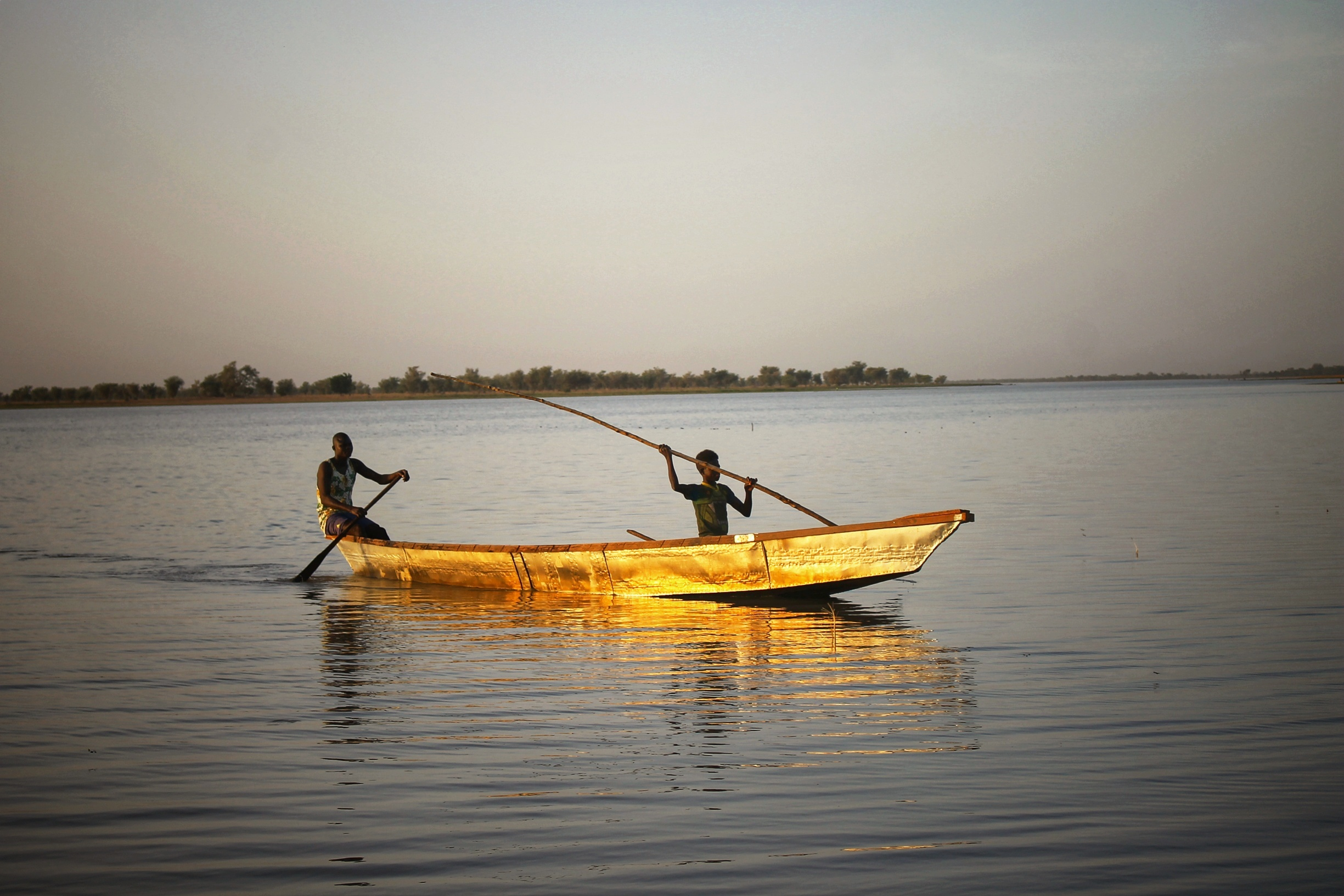
- Fishers at Guere

- Location in Cameroon
- Coordinates: 10.024°N 15.256°E
- Country: Cameroon
- Province: Far North (Extrême-Nord)
- Department: Mayo-Danay
- Elevation: 317 m (1,040 ft)

Population (2005)
  - Total: 38,328

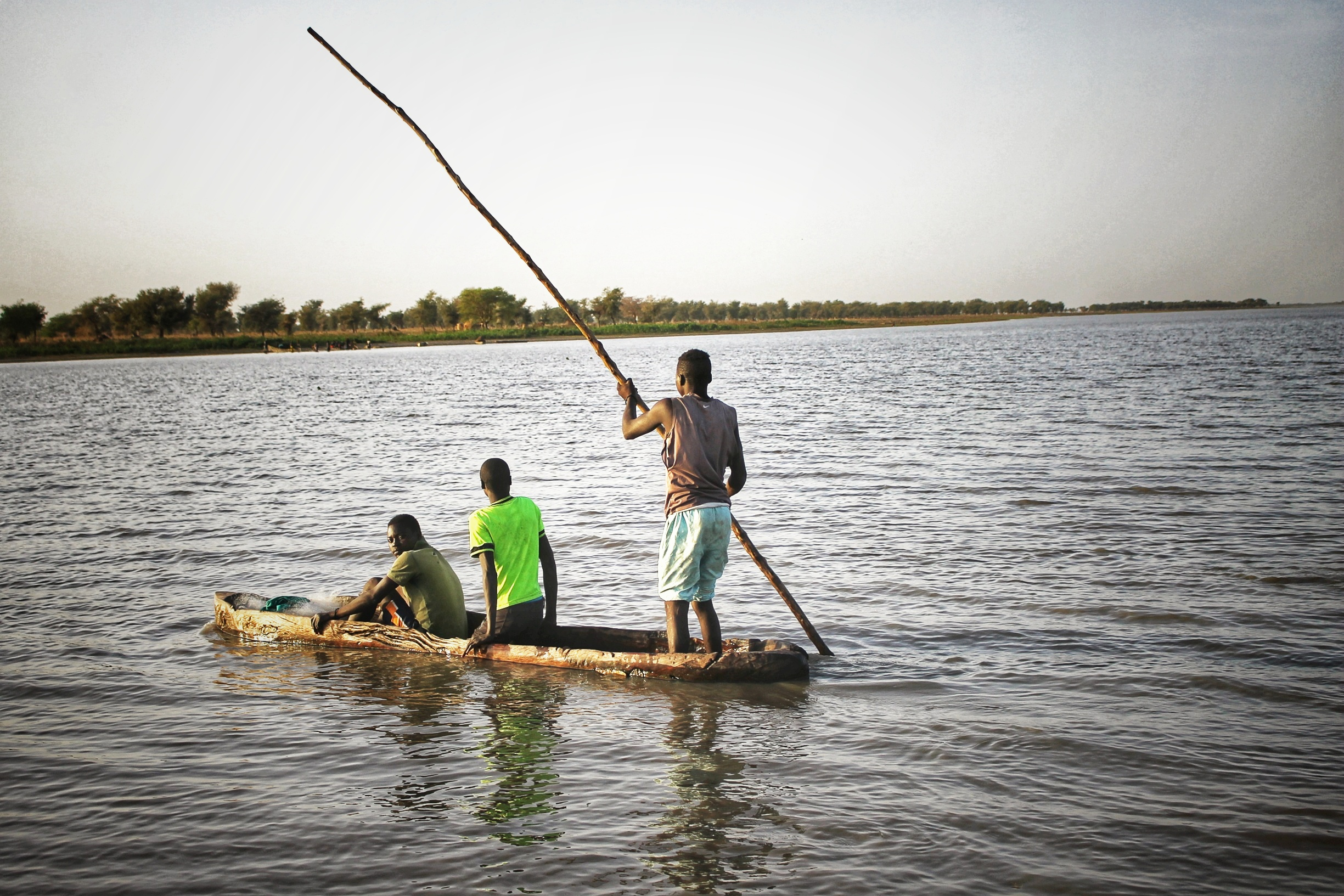
Fishing in Guere lake

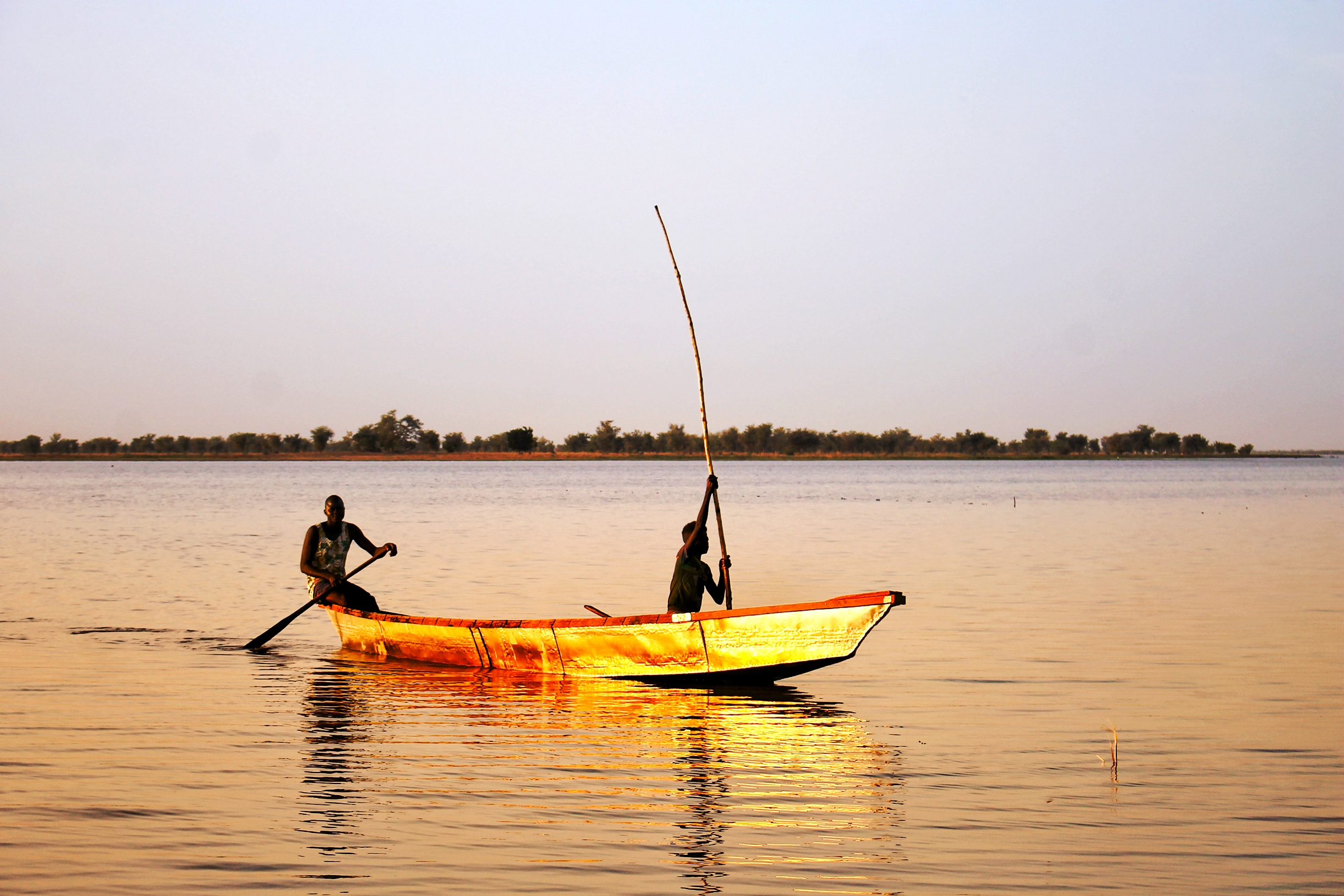
Fishermen on the lake of Guere. March 2019.

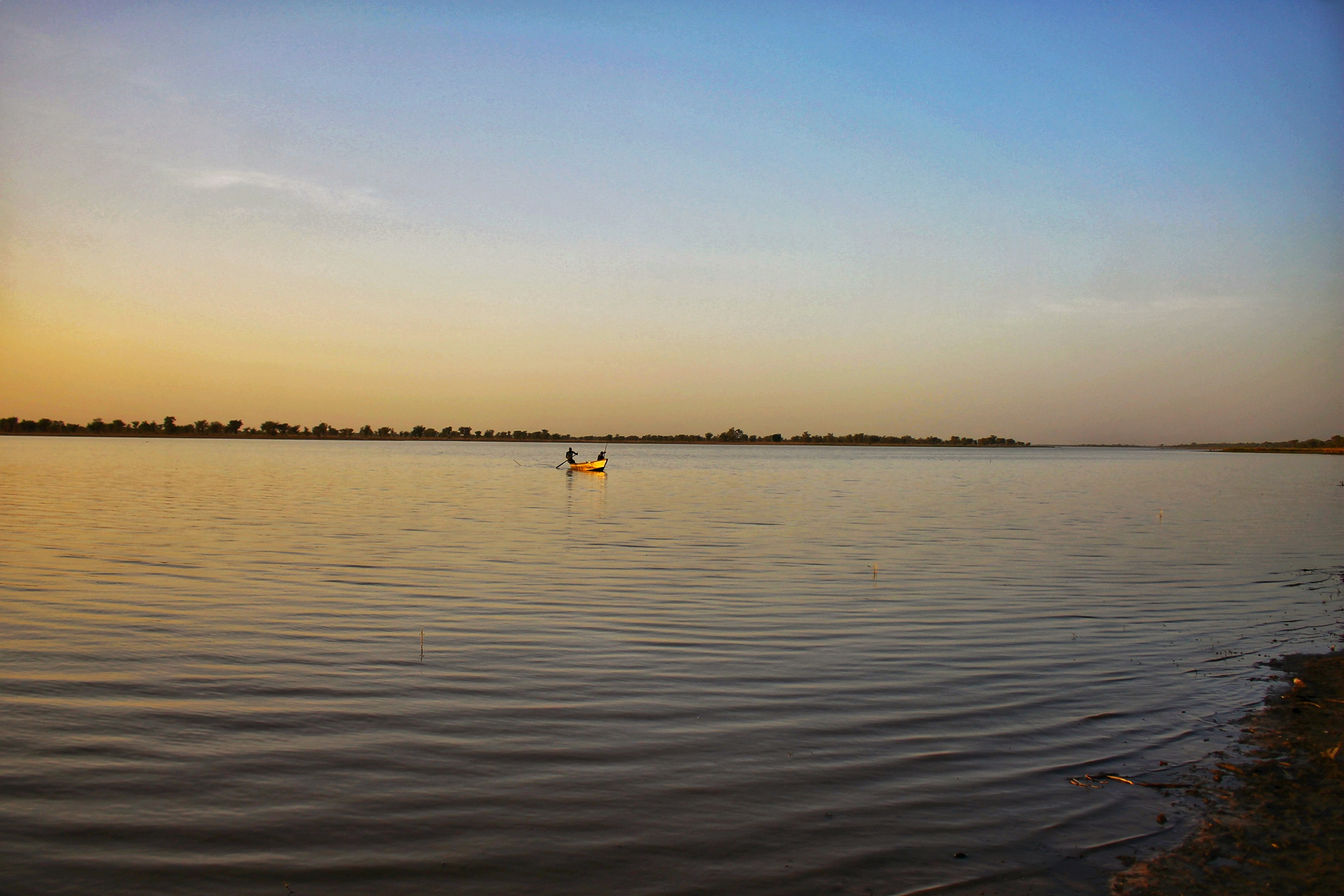
Lake Guere in Mayo-Danay at sunset

Guere (French: Guéré) is a commune in Mayo-Danay Department, Cameroon. In 2005, the population was recorded as 38,328.

== See also ==
- Communes of Cameroon
