= Datcheka =

- Commune and town
- Interactive map of Datcheka
- Country: Cameroon
- Region: Far North
- Department: Mayo-Danay

Population (2005)
  - Total: 31,545
- Time zone: UTC+1 (WAT)

Datcheka is a town and commune in Cameroon in the Mayo-Danay department, Far North Region of Cameroon. As of 2005 census, it had a population of 31,545.

== See also ==
- Communes of Cameroon
