= Kay-Hay =

Village in the Far North Region, Cameroon

Coordinates: 10.6316°N 14.6588°E

- Commune and town
- Interactive map of Kay-Hay
- Country: Cameroon
- Time zone: UTC+1 (WAT)

Kay-Hay is a town and commune in Cameroon.

== See also ==
- Communes of Cameroon
