= Tchati-Bali =

Coordinates: 10.0438°N 14.9296°E

- Commune and town
- Interactive map of Tchati-Bali
- Country: Cameroon
- Time zone: UTC+1 (WAT)

Tchati-Bali is a town and commune in Cameroon.

== See also ==
- Communes of Cameroon
