= Gueme =

Coordinates: 10°30′N 15°11′E

- Commune and town
- Interactive map of Gueme
- Country: Cameroon
- Time zone: UTC+1 (WAT)

Gueme is a town and commune in Cameroon.

== See also ==
- Communes of Cameroon
