= Kalfou, Cameroon =

Village in Far North Region, Cameroon

Coordinates: 10°17′N 14°56′E

- Commune and town
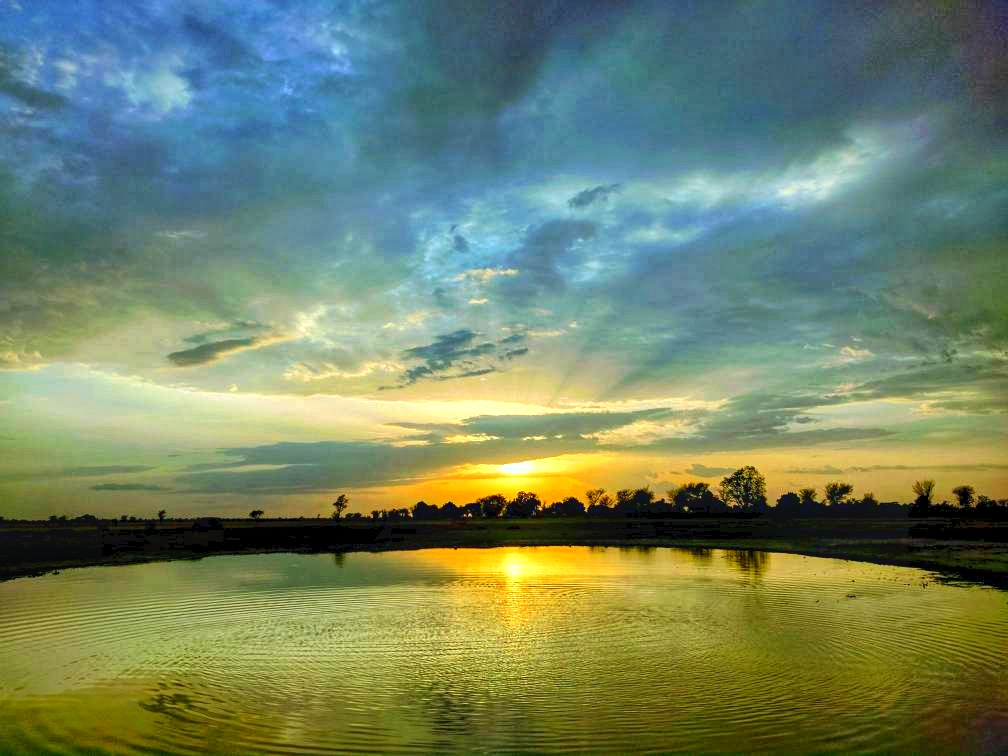
- Sunset in Kalfou community
- Interactive map of Kalfou, Cameroon
- Country: Cameroon
- Department: Far North Region
- Time zone: UTC+1 (WAT)

Kalfou, Cameroon is a town and commune in Cameroon.

== Gallery ==
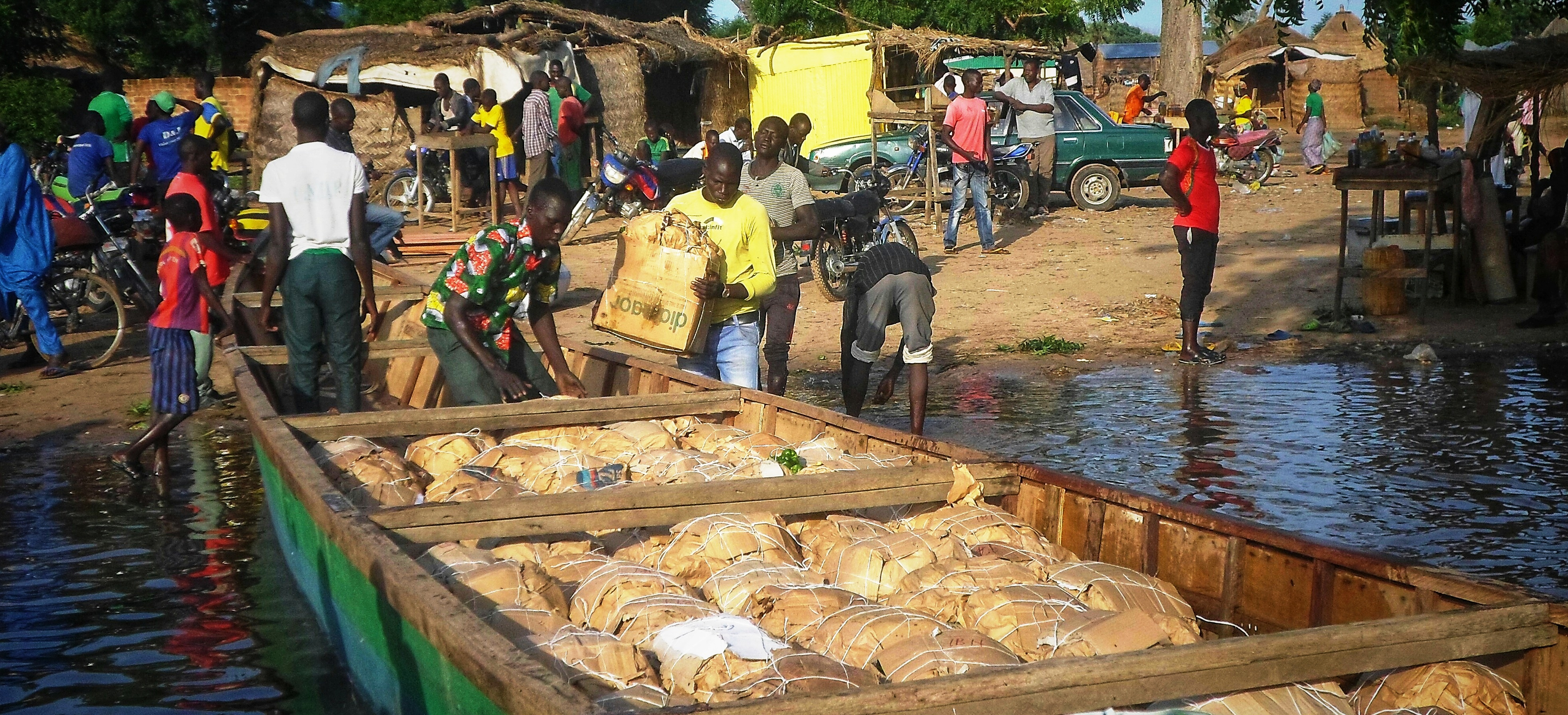
Embarcation of canoe.

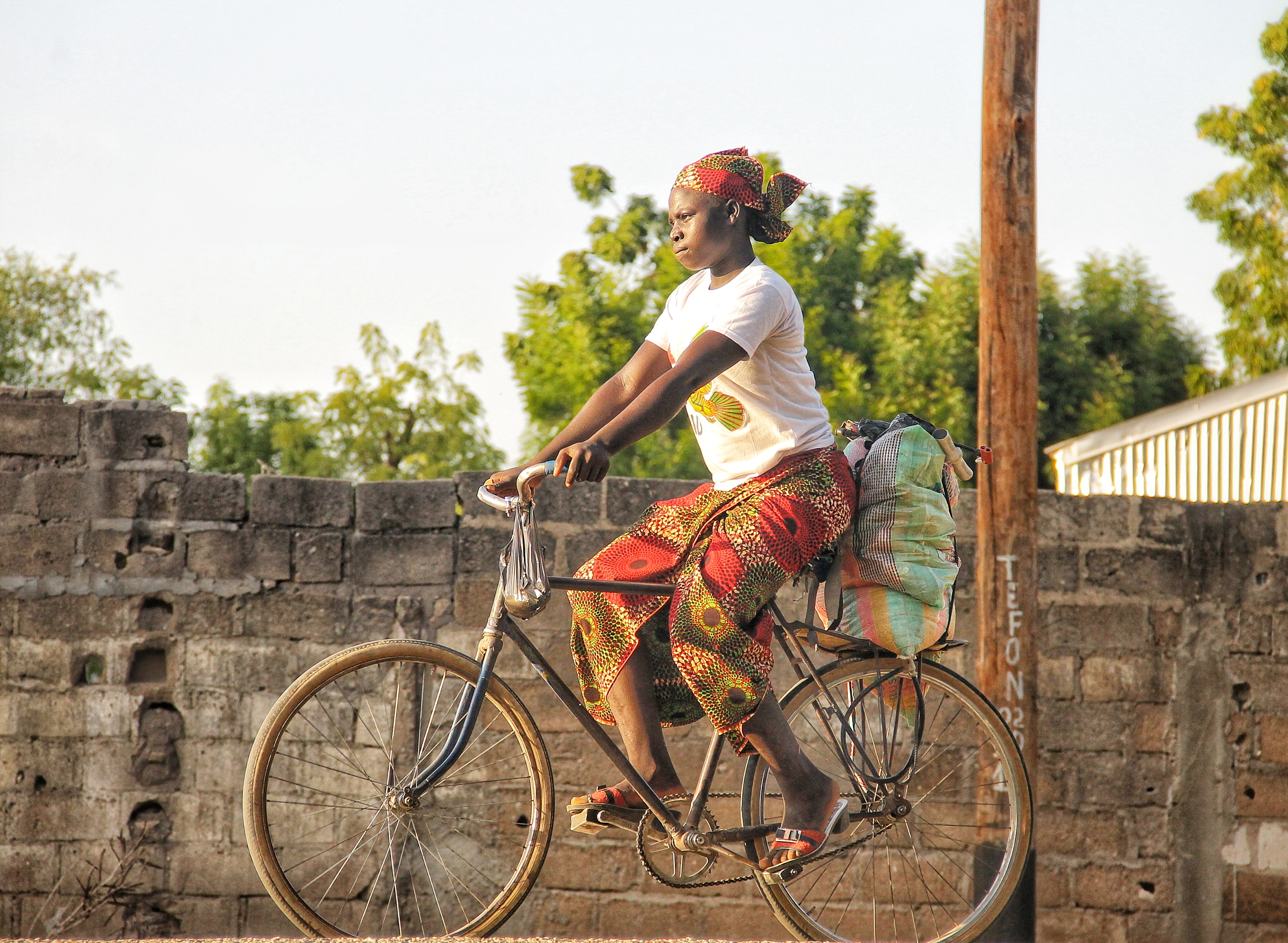
Woman on bicycle.

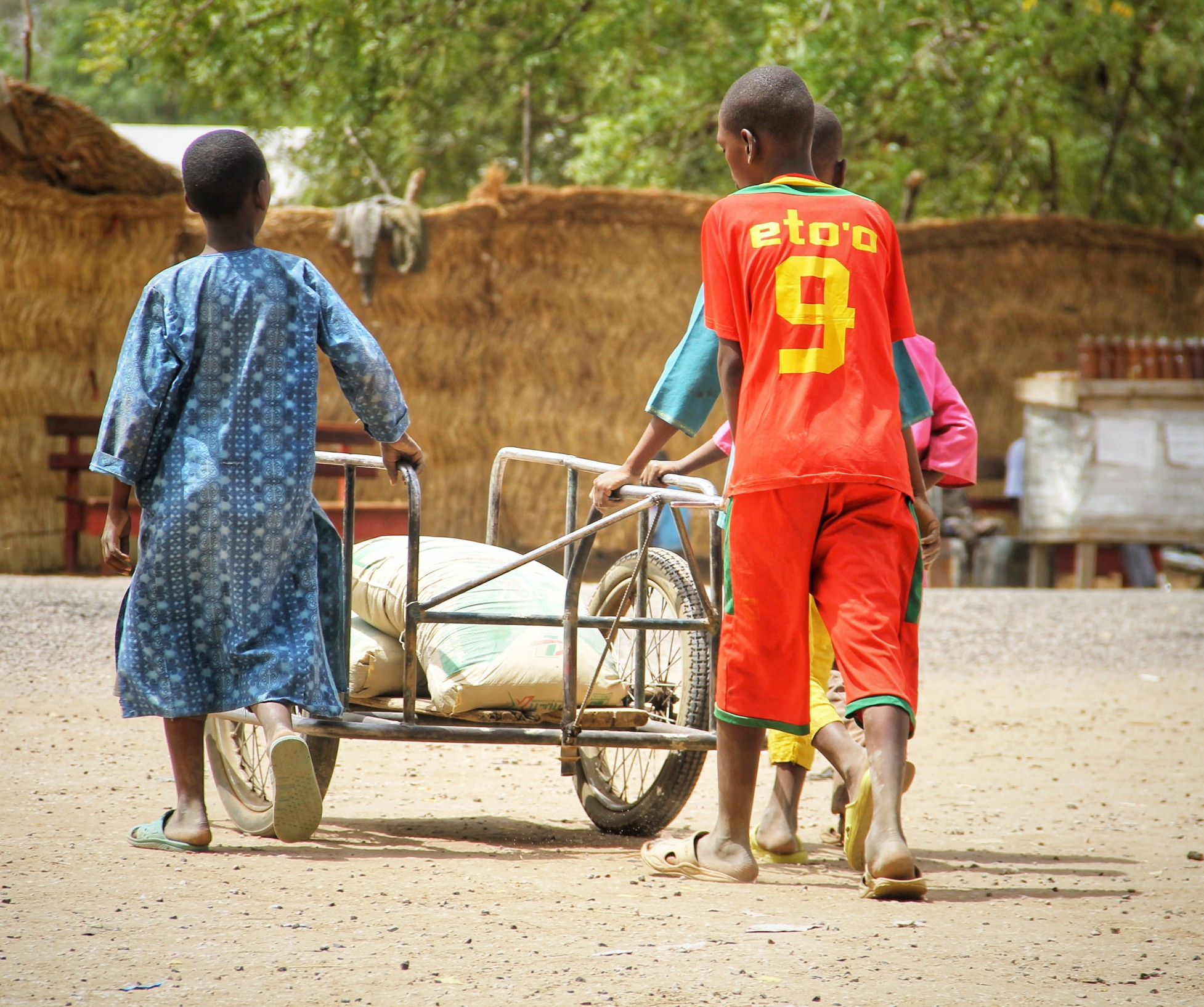
Children carrying
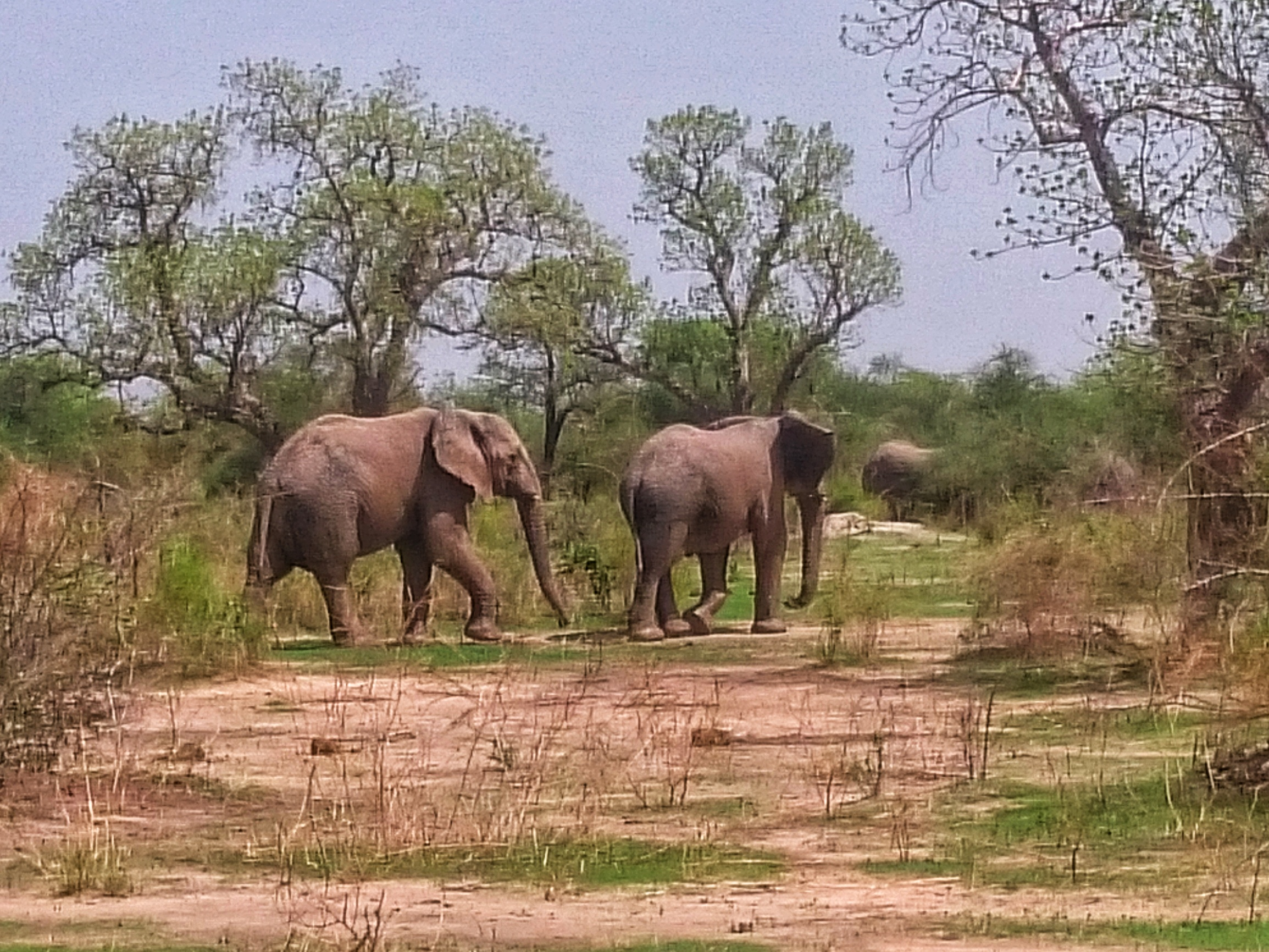
Les éléphants dans la réserve faunique de Kalfou

== See also ==
- Communes of Cameroon
