= Karsten Ayong =

Cameroon-born Czech footballer (born 1998)

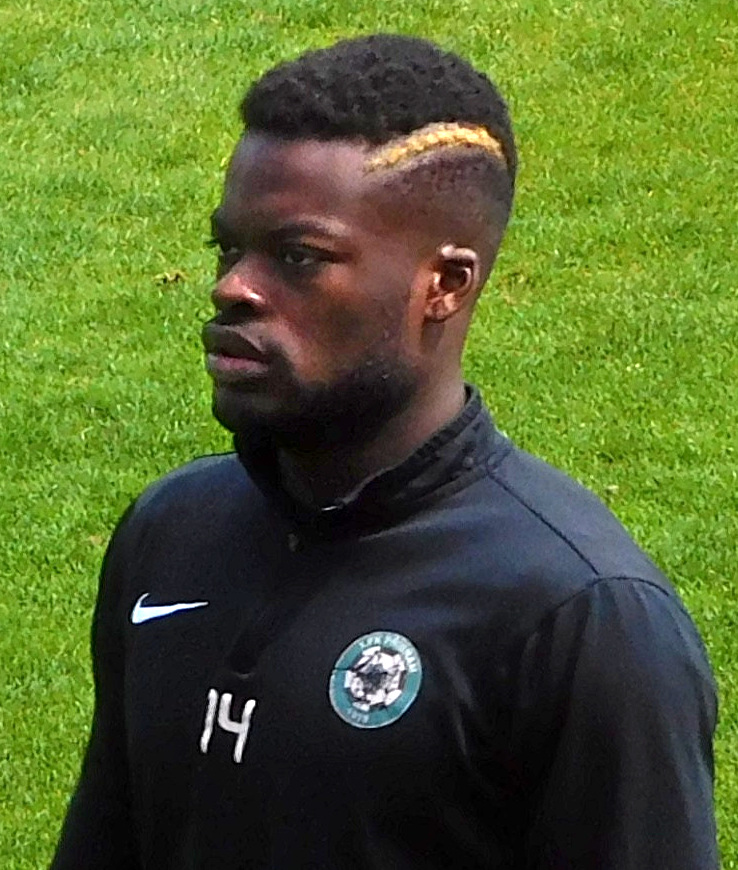

Personal information
- Full name: Bastian Karsten Ayong
- Date of birth: 20 January 1998 (age 28)
- Place of birth: Ombessa, Cameroon
- Height: 1.85 m (6 ft 1 in)
- Position: Forward

Youth career
- 2004–2009: Guienekoue d’Ombessa
- 2010: SK Hostivař
- 2011: ABC Braník
- 2011–2012: Slavia Prague
- 2012–2014: Dynamo České Budějovice
- 2014–2016: Příbram

Senior career*
Years	Team	Apps	(Gls)
2016–2018	Příbram	39	(6)
2018	→ Piast Gliwice (loan)	1	(0)
2019	DAC Dunajská Streda	1	(0)
2019–2021	Dukla Prague	45	(3)
2021–2022	MH Khon Surat City	11	(3)

International career
2017	Czech Republic U20	2	(0)
- * Club domestic league appearances and goals as of 20 January 2024

Bastian Karsten Ayong (born 20 January 1998) is a professional footballer who plays as a forward. Born in Cameroon, he represented Czech Republic at youth level.

He made his Czech First League debut for Příbram on 4 December 2016 in a 2–2 away draw at Mladá Boleslav.
