= Jacqueline Koung à Bessike =

Cameroon politician

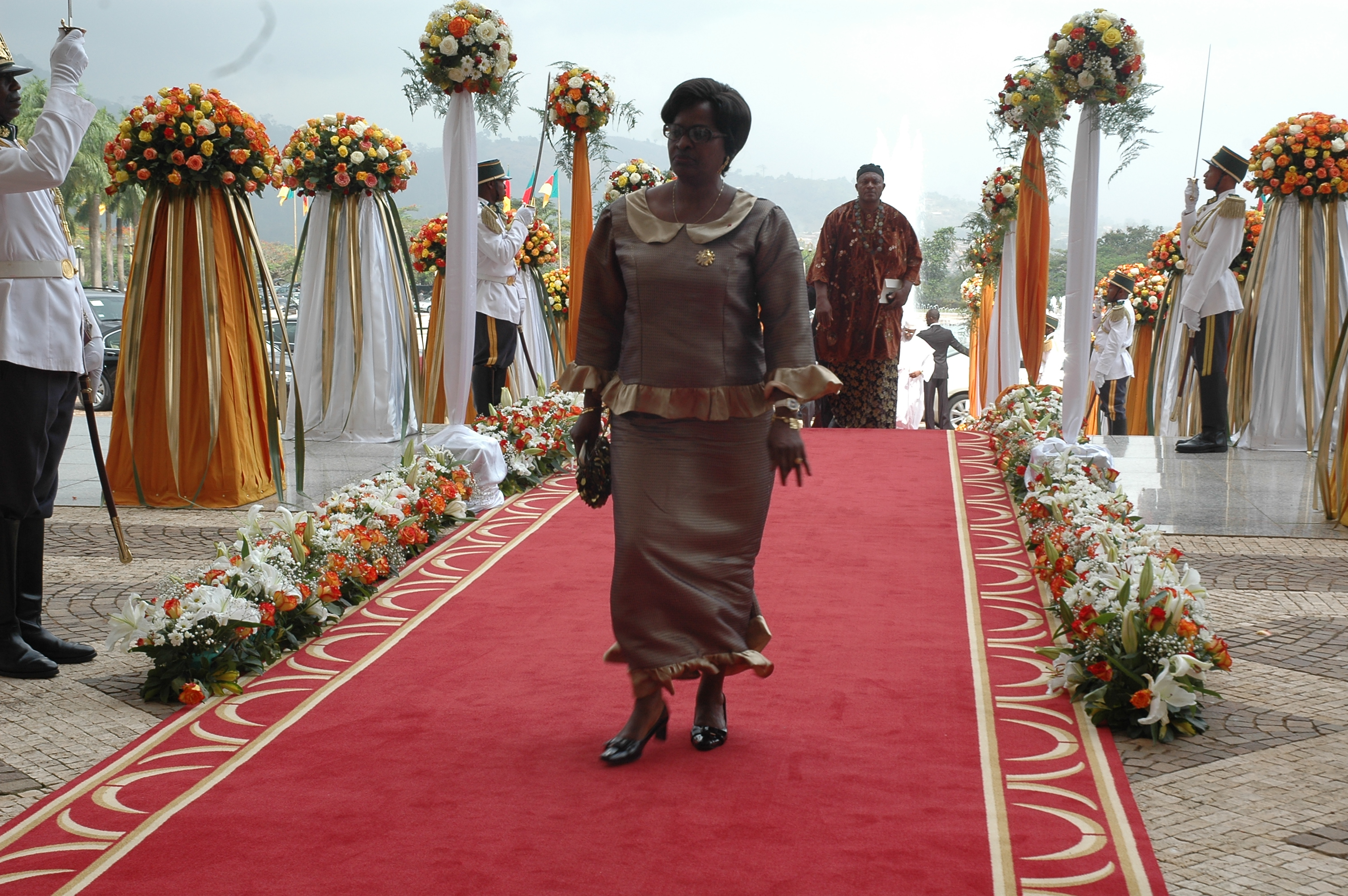
- Jacqueline Koung à Bessike in 2012

Cameroon Minister of State Property and Land Tenure
- Incumbent
- Assumed office 9 December 2011
- President: Paul Biya
- Prime Minister: Philémon Yang
- Preceded by: Jean-Baptiste Beleoken

Personal details
- Born: Bafia (Cameroon)
- Party: CPDM
- Profession: Economist

Jacqueline Koung Bessike is a Cameroonian political figure who was the first woman secretary of state in her country. Since 9 December 2011, she has held the position of Minister of State Property and Land Tenure.

== Biography ==
She is native of Bafia, Mbam-and-Inoubou Division, in the Centre Region of Cameroon.

=== Studies ===
She is an Economist by training, specializing in Banking and Finance.

== Politics ==
In 1995, she served as Secretary General of the Ministry of Tourism. In 2001, she held the same post at the Minister of Labour and Social Security in 2003, she was assigned to the Ministry of Women's Affairs. And in December 2007, she also serves as Secretary General at the Ministry of Employment and Vocational Training.

She is a member of the political party currently in power in Cameroon: Cameroon People's Democratic Movement (CPDM). Since 1996, she has held the position of Second Vice-president of the National Bureau of the Women's Section of the Party: Women's organization of the CPDM (OFRDPC).

== Ministerial mandate ==
During the Cabinet reshuffle of 11 November 2011, she was appointed Minister of State Property and Land Tenure (MINDCAF). She was re-appointed to this position during the cabinet reshuffle of 2 October 2015.

== Distinction ==
She is Commander of the Order and Value.
