= Gibering Bol Alima =

Cameroonian politician

- Born: February 20, 1942; Mbanga, Littoral Region, Cameroon
- Died: July 30, 1999 (aged 57); Yaoundé General Hospital, Cameroon
- Education: University of London
- Occupations: Politician, agronomist engineer
- Known for: Ministerial roles, Political career

Gibering Bol Alima was a Cameroonian politician. An agronomic engineer by training, he held administrative and political functions as a minister, ambassador and deputy.

== Early life and education ==
Born on February 20, 1942 in Mbanga, Littoral region, Cameroon, Alima completed his secondary education at the Lycée Général Leclerc in Yaoundé, where he obtained a Baccalaureate in elementary mathematics in 1962.

== Career ==
Administratively, Gibering Bol Alima occupied several positions:

- Head of the Haut-Nyong agricultural district in Abong-Mbang (1966–1967)
- Deputy Director of ENSA (1970–1975)
- Co-director of the FAO/ENSA project (1973–1976)
- Director of ENSA (1975–1979)
- Director General of the University Center of Dschang in conjunction with his functions as Director of ENSA from August 7, 1978.

He held several political positions as well:

- Minister of Planning and Industry (April 12, 1983 – February 4, 1984)
- Minister of Higher Education and Scientific Research (February 4, 1984 – August 24, 1985)
- Cameroonian Ambassador to the United Kingdom (January 22, 1987 – October 5, 1994).
- Member of the Central Committee of the Cameroonian National Union from 1980 to 1985, where he served as Deputy Secretary for Youth.

In May 1997, during the 1997 Cameroonian parliamentary election, he was elected to the National Assembly deputy for Mbam-et-Inoubou of the Cameroon People's Democratic Movement, serving until his death on July 30, 1999 at the Yaoundé General Hospital.

== Publications ==
- Development and use of human resources in Cameroon, (Clé editions, Yaoundé, 1984).
- Preliminary studies on the biological effects of cutting height on the growth and development of Stylosauthes gracilis HBK'.
- Rapport de stage de deuxième année ("Second year internship report"). Biology Series, 1974, (23), pp. 57–65. Study at the Adiopodoumé Laboratory in Ivory Coast. ORSTOM, 1969, 85 p. multigr.

== Bibliography ==
- Historical Dictionary of the Republic of Cameroon (Historical Dictionaries of Africa book 113) 4th Edition, by Mark Dike DeLancey, Rebecca Neh Mbuh, Mark W. DeLancey, Publisher: Scarecrow Press; 4 edition (May 3, 2010),
- "Les intellectuels camerounais sous le régime Ahidjo (1958–1982), Maximin Emagna" (PDF). gap.ugent.be. Archived from the original (PDF) on 29 March 2017.
