= Jean-Baptiste Beleoken =

Cameroonian politician

Jean-Baptiste Beleoken (born 7 May 1932) is a Cameroonian politician who served in the government of Cameroon as Minister of State Property and Land Tenure from 2009 to 2011. During the 1970s, he served successively as Cameroon's Ambassador to the Soviet Union, as Ambassador to the People's Republic of China, and as Ambassador to West Germany; subsequently he was Director of State Protocol from 1980 to 1989. After a long absence from state affairs, Beleoken returned to the political scene as Director of the Civil Cabinet of the Presidency from 2005 to 2009; he was then appointed to the government as Minister of State Property and Land Tenure in June 2009, remaining in the latter post until December 2011.

== Administrative and diplomatic career ==
Born at Nébolen in Ndikinimeki arrondissement, Beleoken began working at the Ministry of Finance in October 1955 as a contract employee. Subsequently, he held various posts, including that of Assistant to the Head of Account Balancing at the Ministry of Finance, before becoming Sub-Prefect and Mayor of Bafia in 1960. He was sent to Paris as Commercial Counsellor at Cameroon's Embassy to France from 1961 to 1964, and he was Cameroon's Economic and Commercial Counsellor in New York City from 1964 to 1967. He then returned to Cameroon, where from 1967 to 1969 he worked as Director of Commodities at the Ministry of Trade and Industry and then as Director of Economic and Technical Affairs at the Ministry of Foreign Affairs.

From 1969 to 1973, Beleoken was Director of the Sub-Regional Bureau of the United Nations Economic Commission for Africa, based in Kinshasa. He was appointed as Ambassador to the Soviet Union in 1973 and was later appointed as Ambassador to the People's Republic of China, presenting his credentials in Beijing on 8 November 1976. In 1978 he was instead appointed as Ambassador to West Germany, and he left Beijing on 28 December 1978. Beleoken was recalled to Cameroon to serve as Director of State Protocol in 1980. He remained Director of State Protocol after President Ahmadou Ahidjo was succeeded by Paul Biya in 1982, eventually leaving the post in 1989.

== Return to the political scene ==
Beleoken taught at the International Relations Institute of Cameroon until he was appointed as Director of the Civil Cabinet of the Presidency of the Republic on 16 June 2005, replacing Edgar Alain Mebe Ngo'o. After four years in that post, he was appointed to the government as Minister of State Property and Land Reform on 30 June 2009. He conducted a tour in Yaoundé in July 2009, visiting construction sites on state property and local offices of the ministry while meeting ministry personnel.

Beleoken went to Kribi to review the demarcation of land for a planned deep sea port in the area, which would facilitate the export of minerals, in October 2009.

In early 2010, Beleoken discussed his plans for a renovation of the Ministry of State Property; he envisioned the ministry taking a more active role in facilitating infrastructure projects and encouraging investment. He also discussed plans to expand the availability of housing and fight corruption at the ministry. At a conference for officials from his ministry on 6 May 2010, Beleoken stressed that the good management of lands was an important factor in national development. He called on ministry officials to review the outcome of land reforms five years earlier; those reforms had decentralized the process of issuing land certificates and produced a sharp increase in the number of certificates issued.

Beleoken was dismissed from the government on 9 December 2011.
