= Kiiki =

- Commune and town
- Location in Cameroon
- Coordinates: 4°40′55″N 11°10′39″E
- Country: Cameroon
- Time zone: UTC+1 (WAT)

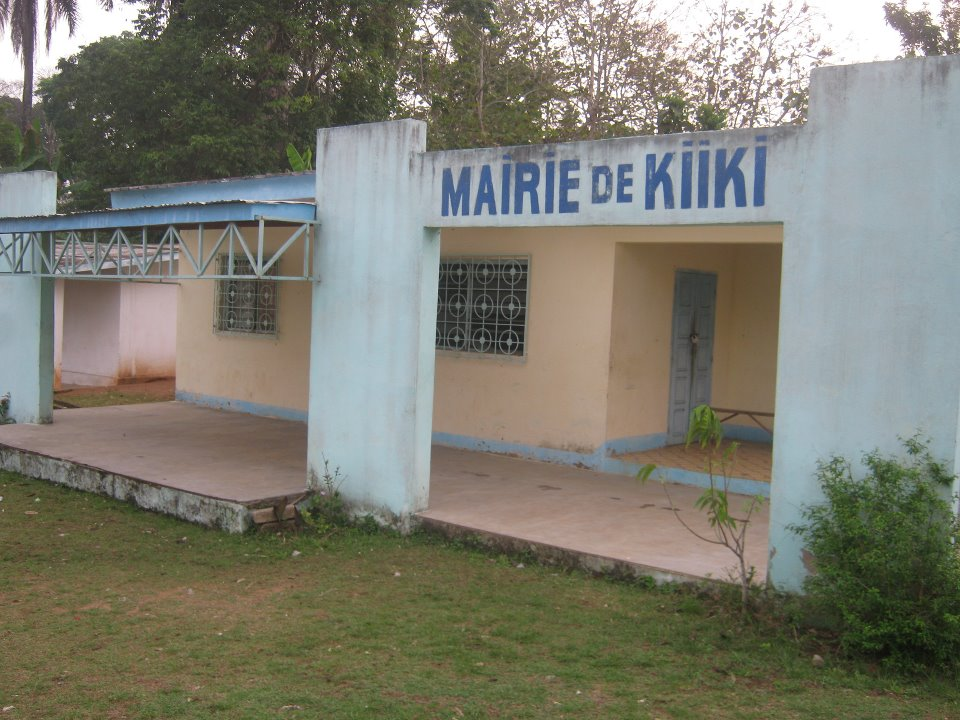
Kiiki's Town Hall

Kiiki is a town and commune in Mbam-et-Inoubou department of Centre Region in Cameroon.

== See also ==
- Communes of Cameroon
