= Deuk =

Coordinates: 4°56′N 11°16′E

- Commune and town
- Interactive map of Deuk
- Country: Cameroon
- Time zone: UTC+1 (WAT)

Deuk is a town and commune in Mbam-et-Inoubou department of Centre Region in Cameroon.

== See also ==
- Communes of Cameroon
