= Kon-Yambetta =

Coordinates: 4.8333°N 11.0667°E

- Commune and town
- Interactive map of Kon-Yambetta
- Country: Cameroon
- Time zone: UTC+1 (WAT)

Kon-Yambetta is a town and commune in Mbam-et-Inoubou department of Centre Region in Cameroon.

== See also ==
- Communes of Cameroon
