= Nitoukou =

Coordinates: 4°38′N 10°53′E

- Commune and town
- Interactive map of Nitoukou
- Country: Cameroon
- Time zone: UTC+1 (WAT)

Nitoukou is a town and commune in Mbam-et-Inoubou department of Centre Region in Cameroon.

Number of municipal councilors: 25

Area: 800 km^{2}

Density: 12,5 inhabitants/km^{2}

Number of inhabitants: 10 000 inhabitants

== See also ==
- Communes of Cameroon
