= Ndikiniméki =

Coordinates: 4°46′N 10°50′E

- Commune and town
- Interactive map of Ndikiniméki
- Country: Cameroon
- Time zone: UTC+1 (WAT)

Ndikiniméki is a town and commune in Mbam-et-Inoubou department of Centre Region in Cameroon.

== Notables ==
- Ambroise Oyongo, Soccer player

== See also ==
- Communes of Cameroon
