= Bafia =

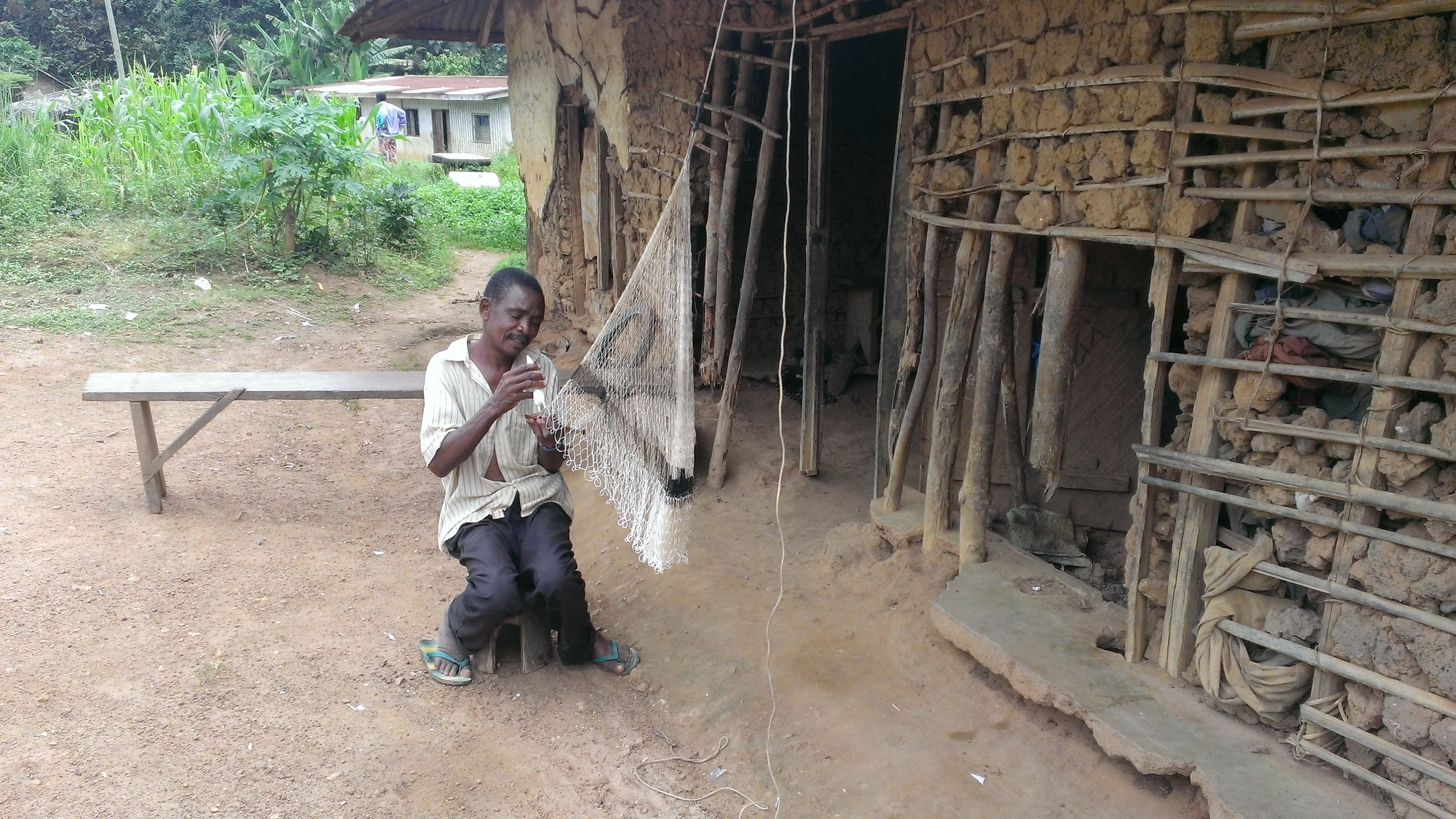
- Bafia artisan

- Location in Cameroon
- Coordinates: 4°45′N 11°13′E
- Country: Cameroon
- Province: Centre Province
- Department: Mbam-et-Inoubou
- Elevation: 1,532 ft (467 m)

Population (2012)
  - Total: 54,754

Bafia is a Cameroonian town and commune in the Centre Province region. It is the capital of the Mbam-et-Inoubou department. It lies 120 km (75 mi) north of the country's capital Yaoundé. Bafia has approximately 55,700 inhabitants, making it the third-largest city in the province after Yaoundé and Mbalmayo. Most citizens belong to either the Bafia people or the Yambassa people. It is the see of the eponymous diocese.

== Origin of the name ==
The story is told that when the Germans, once the colonial power, were crossing through the Mbam region, they stopped on the high plateau of the region which is today called Bafia to ask a native who was returning from hunting what the name of the area was. Assuming that the guests were asking his name, the hunter answered, "Ufino yame yo lomo Bofia Nkano" ("My name is Bofia Nkano"). This misunderstanding led to the name "Bafia" being given to the area.

== Administration ==
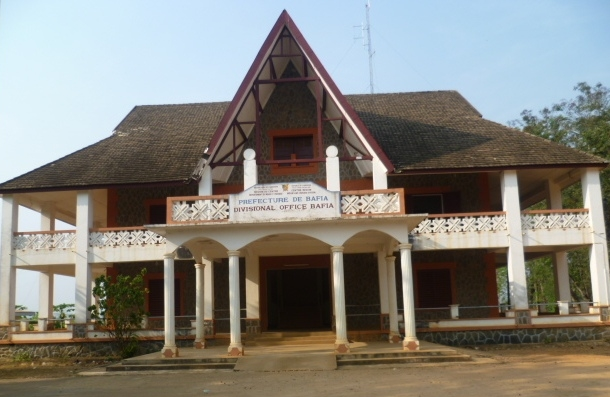
Building of the Prefecture of Bafia

=== Mayors of the urban district of Bafia (1962–present) ===
- Kotouo Pierre 29 June 1962 – 23 June 1965
- Nkendjouo LUC 29 June 1965 – 13 August 1965
- Anong Amos August 1965 and 15 June 1967 – 18 February 1970
- Medjo Akono 4 March 1970 – 7 December 1970
- Mbassa à Zock Aboubakar 30 January 1971 – 20 November 1975
- Mone Mvondo Pierre 18 December 1975 – 12 November 1977
- Machia Djiberou 12 November 1977 – 20 October 1987
- Mbamba à Dong Alphonse 20 October 1985 – 5 February 1996
- Mougam à Ribouèm 5 February 1996 – 2002
- Machia Abdoulay 2002 – 22 July 2007
- Ahmed ISSA 22 July 2007 – present

=== Prefecture of Bafia ===
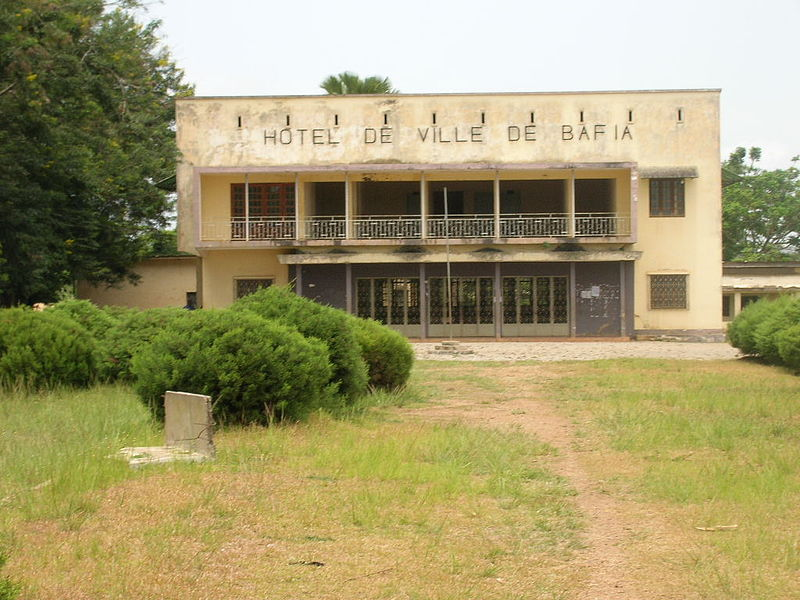
Bafia City Hall

The office of the Bafia Divisional Office was built by Italians, prisoners of the first World War in 1920 under the supervision of French. The former department of MBAM was the actual department of Mbam-et–Inoubou and Mbam-et-Kim. Since 1992 Bafia has been divide in two, the Division of Mbam-et-Inoubou and Mbam et Kim. Bafia also has a Sub–Préfecture to administer the district of Bafia, a commune that include the territorial spring of this commune. All the central administration of the county is handled in the town by departmental and district delegates.

=== Justice ===
The highest court of the district is located in Bafia. There is one prison and a police force. The public notary, bailiffs of justice, and lawyers have their offices in the Bafia town center.

== Infrastructure ==
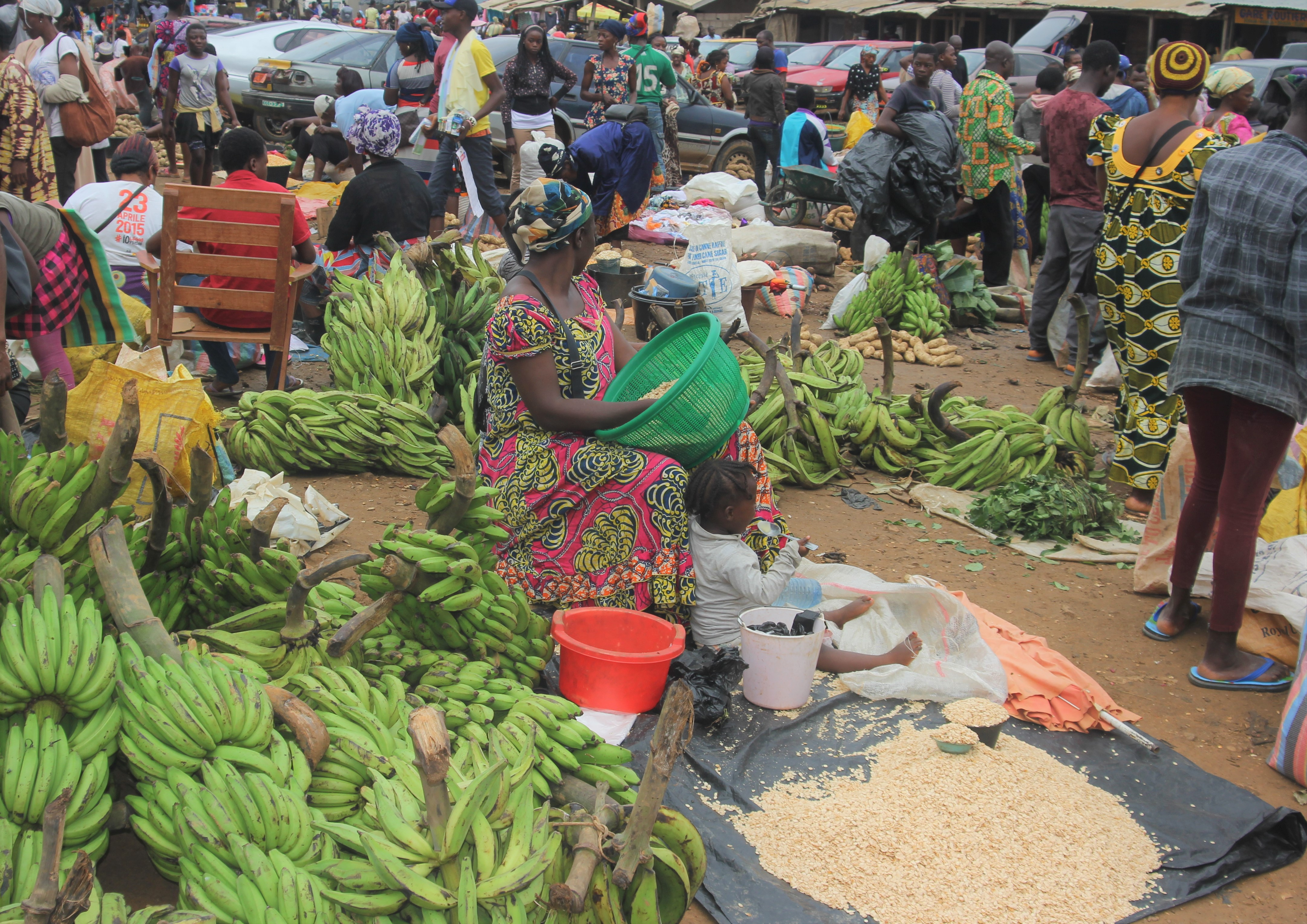
Vegetable Market Scene in Bafia - Cameroon

=== Education ===
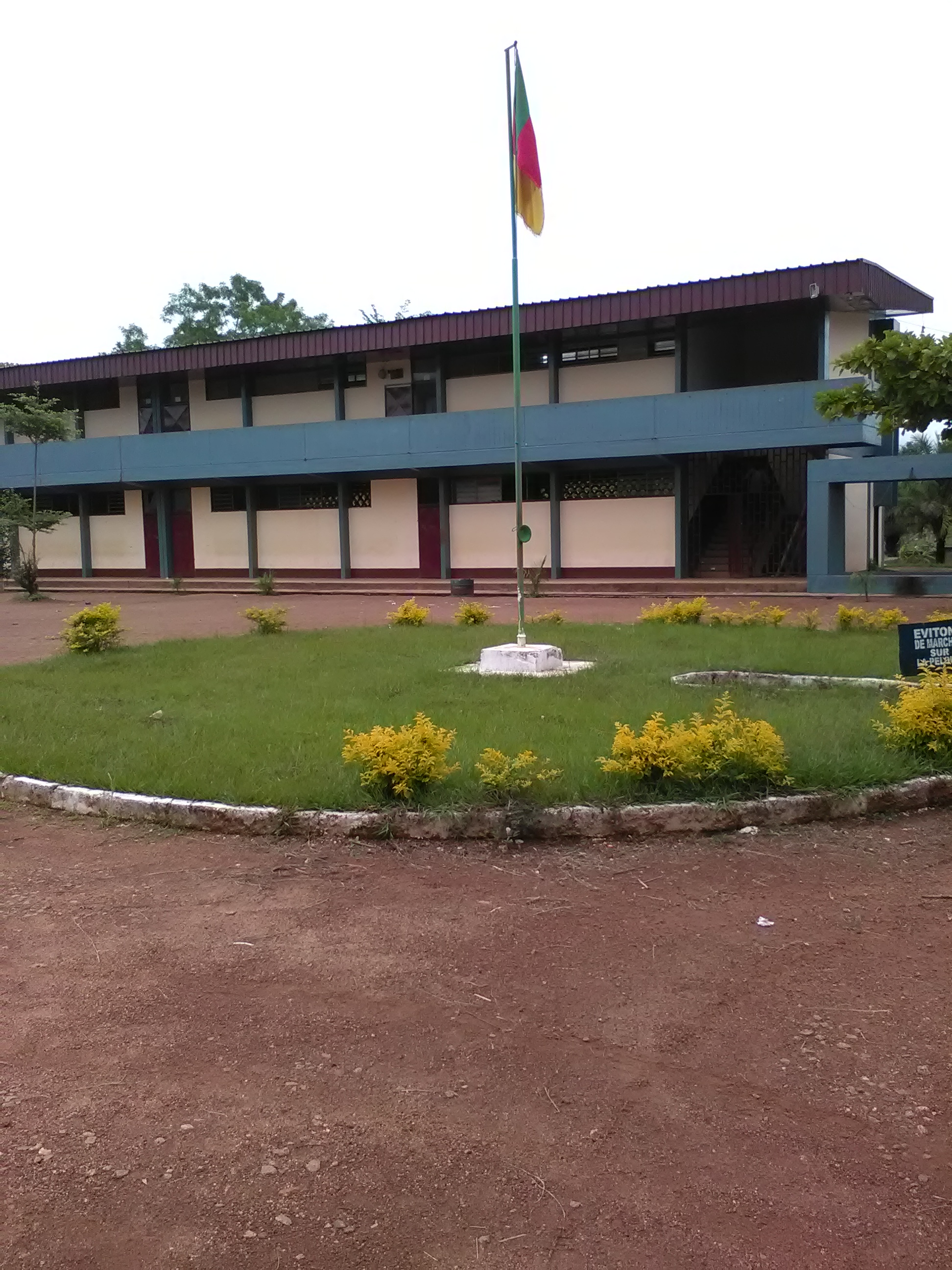
Government High School of Bafia: "Lycée Classique et Moderne de Bafia"

The town of Bafia has one standard school, a teachers school of education (ENIEG), one classic high school, one technical high school, a college of technical industrial education and commerce (cetic of Kiki), a bilingual high school, and three colleges of secondary education.

=== Health ===
The district hospital of Bafia is the principal medical structure of the town. It has many specialties (general medicine, pediatrics, gynecology, odonto-stomatology, surgery, etc.).

=== Sports ===
The Bafia football club enjoys a stadium of its own: the Ayem stadium. Its name comes from the name of a prefect who was a fan of football in general and took the initiative to build a stadium and offer it to the Bafia club and for use by nearby teams.

Bafia Volleyball Evolution has one of the country's top women's volleyball teams.

=== Services ===
There are four fuel stations for residents to use. Motor taxis serve areas once inaccessible to cars. The main roads of the town are paved. Urban lighting is not provided everywhere. A post office offers all postal services. Mobile and landline telephone operators are also active. Banking services are made available by microfinance and money transfer establishments.

The town has two bakeries as well as shops and markets, bars and taverns. Several restaurants operate in the town and offer a variety of dishes dominated by local dishes (kepen, kibazi, kidjane, bitooso, etc.). A two-star hotel with a nightclub (discothèque) and several others slightly smaller establishments provide visitor accommodation.

=== Access ===
Bafia is accessible by road. Coming from Yaoundé, many road transport companies provide services using the 121 km long Bafia road from the bus station of Tongolo (in the north of Yaoundé). Coming from Douala, one can either pass through Yaoundé (360 km), or through Bafang and Bangangté or Bafang and Bafoussam (about 390 km in each case). The Biamo airfield, very active during the first fifteen years after the independence, is no longer able to receive monomotors (mono-engines), twin-engined planes or helicopters.

== Notable residents ==
- Amina Gerba – Cameroonian-Canadian entrepreneur (born 1961)
- Jacqueline Koung à Bessike – Cameroon politician – Cameroon Minister of State Property and Land Tenure (2011–2019)
- Pamela Noutcho Sawa – Cameroonian-Italian boxer

== Gallery ==
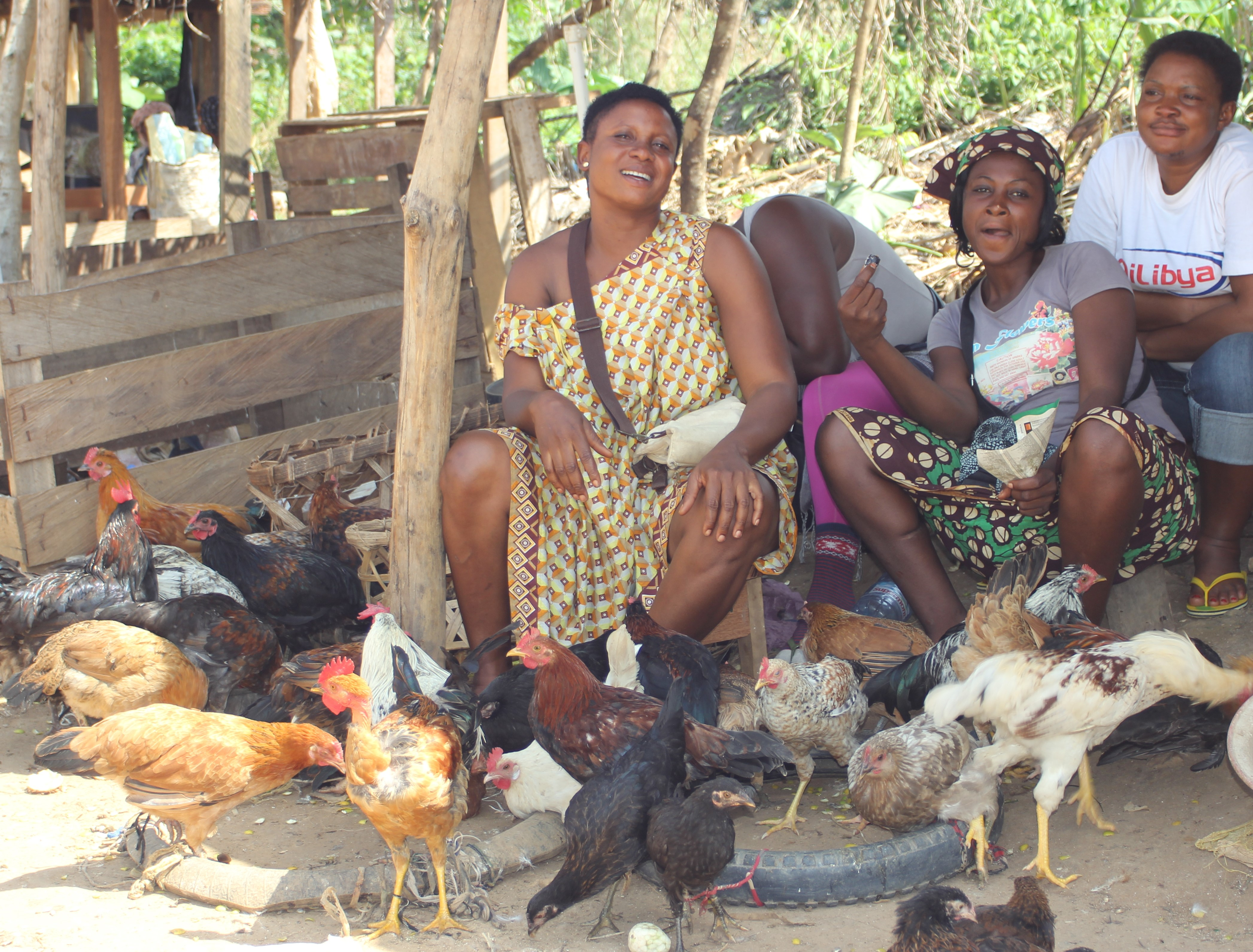
Pepper saleswoman

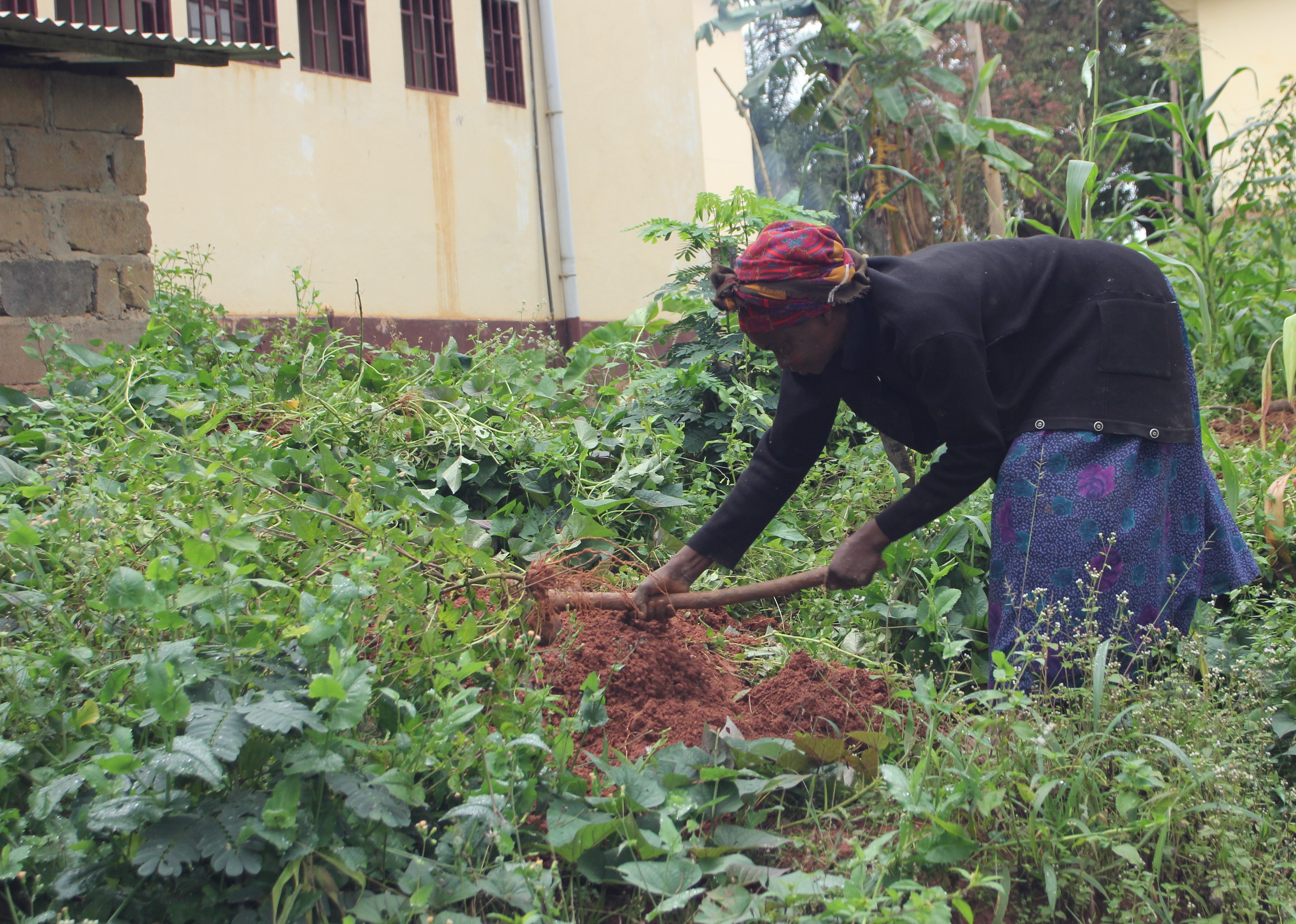
Harvesting yams on a local farm

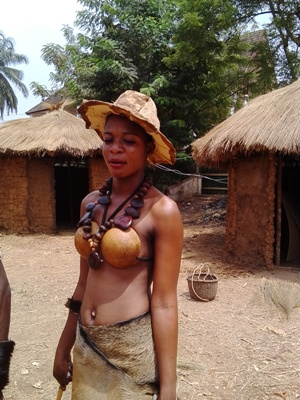
Bafia dancer

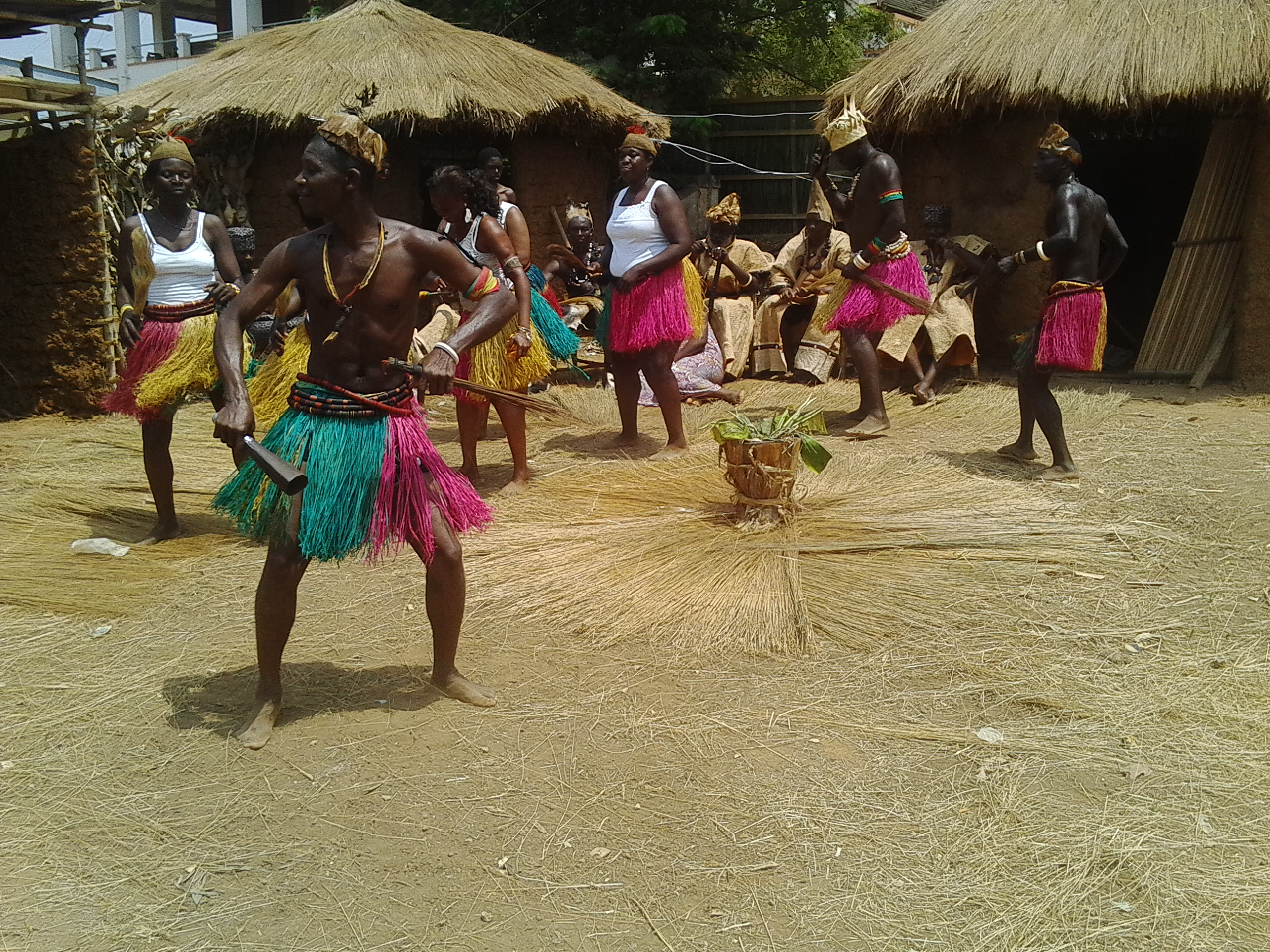
Bafia dance

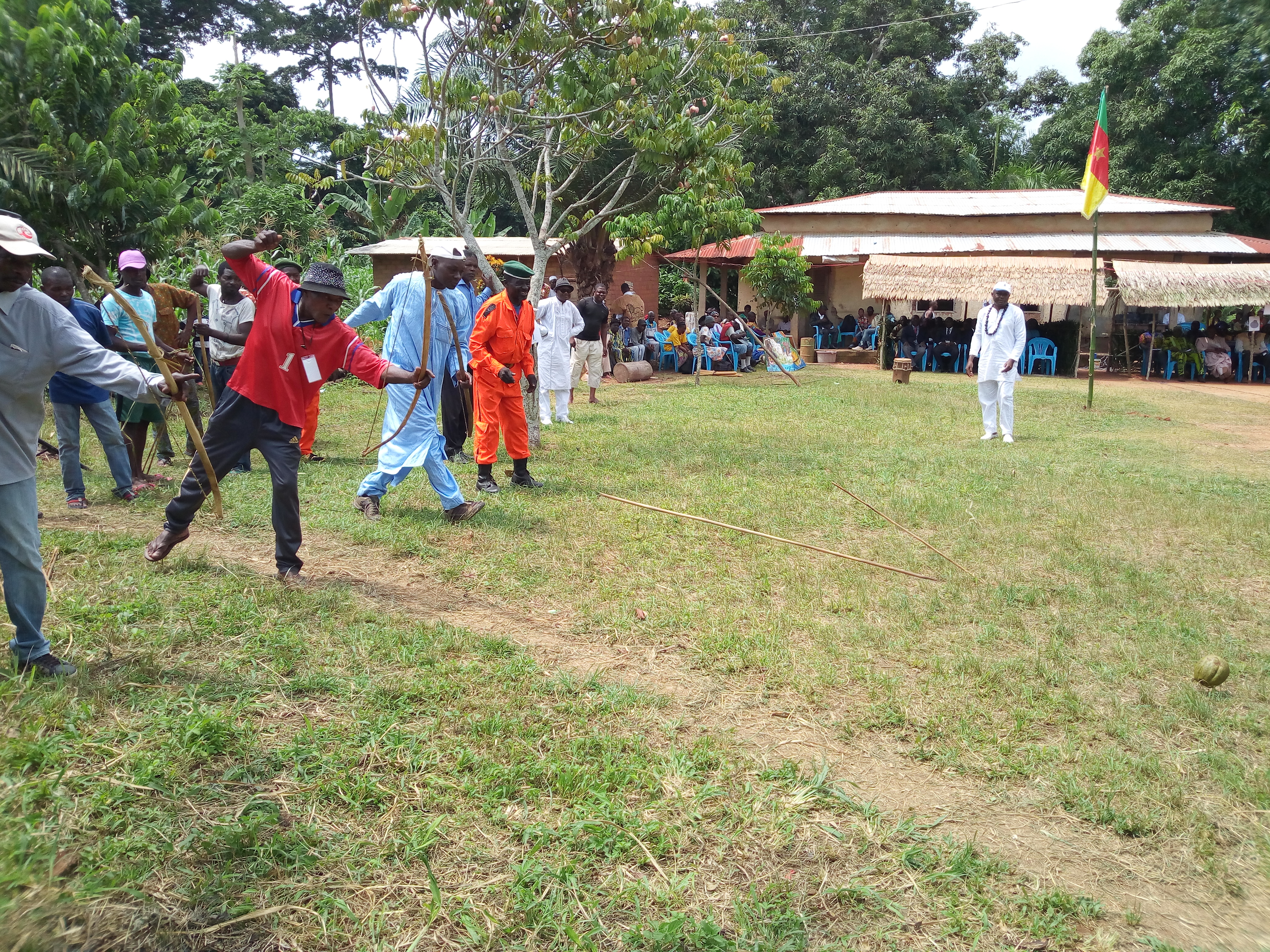
Kákámba

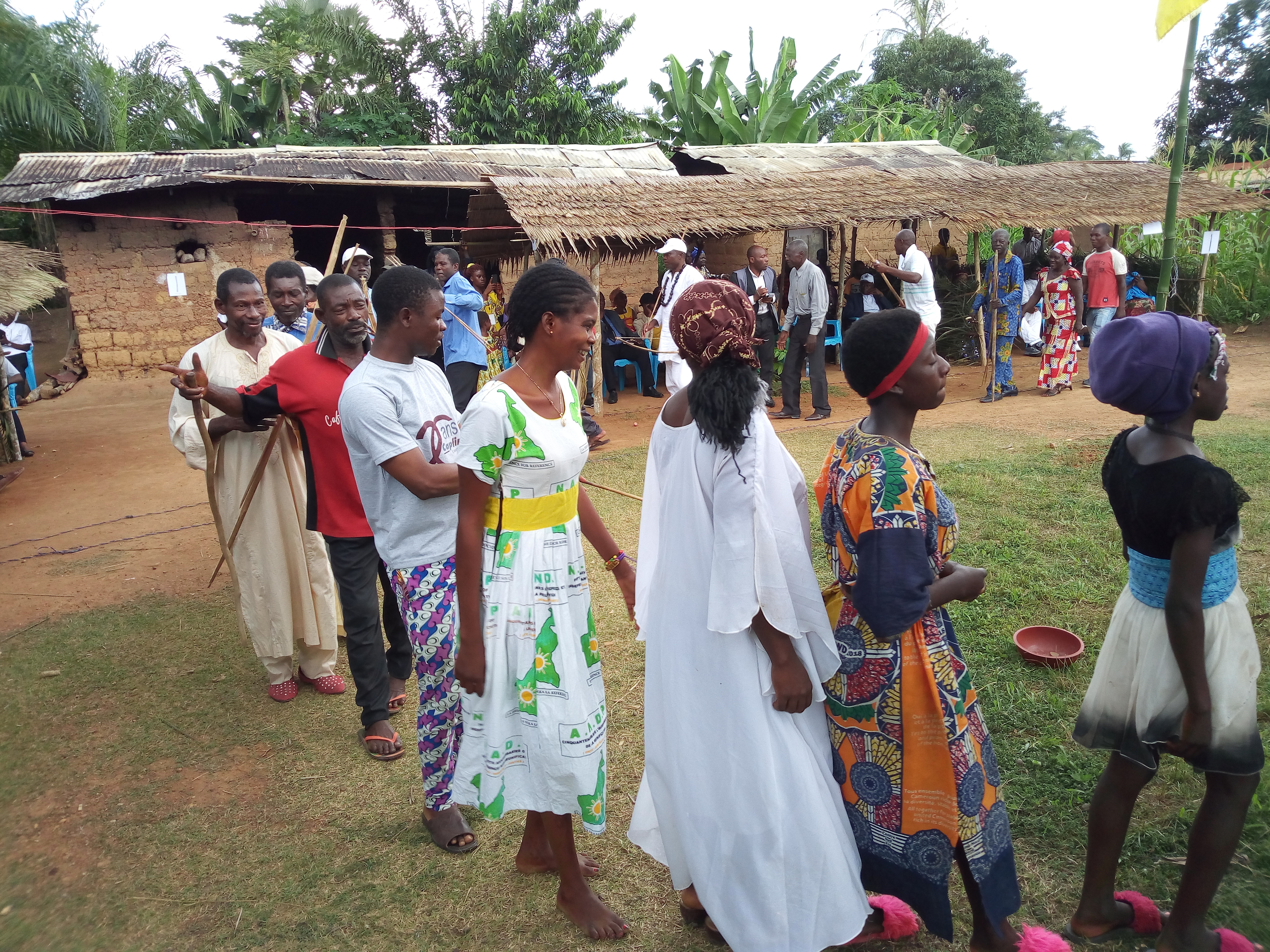
Mankana, ceremonial

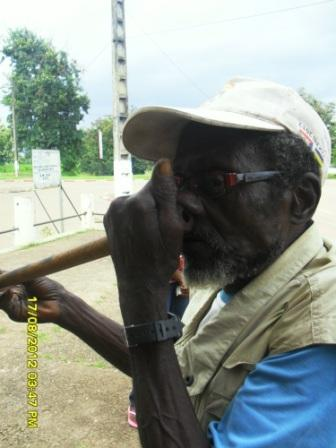
Nostril flute

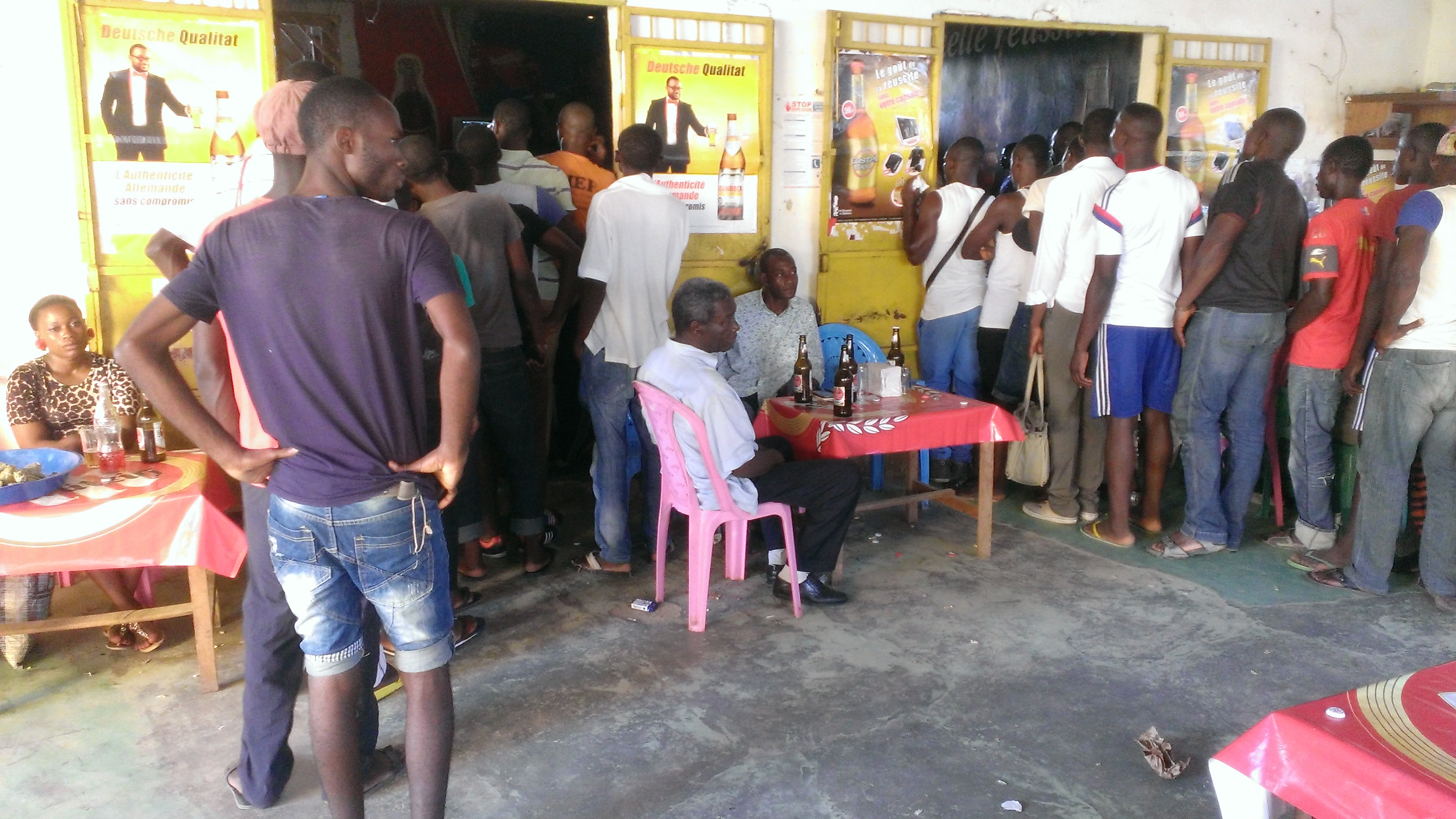
Spectators of a football match

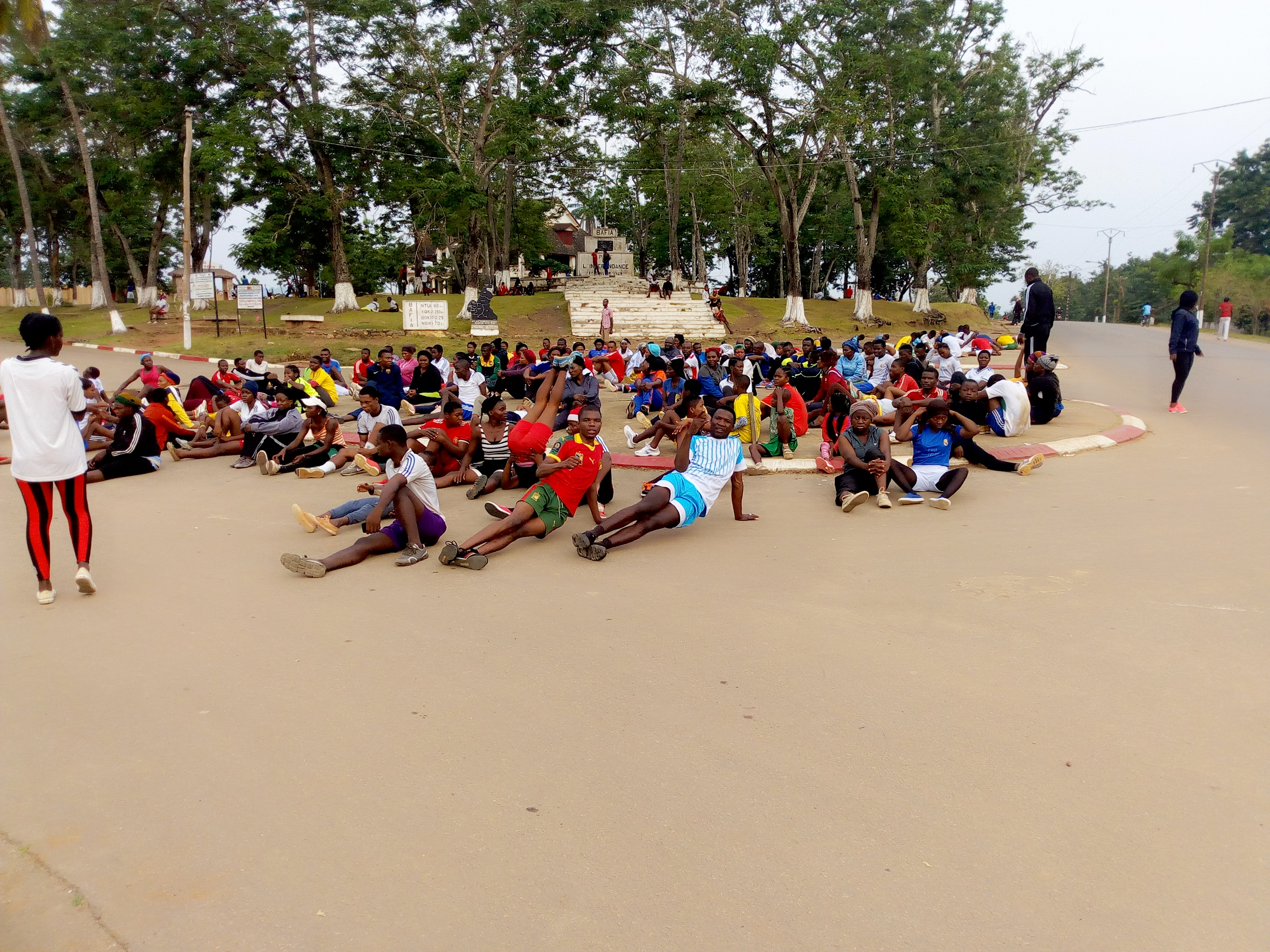
Sport session for all

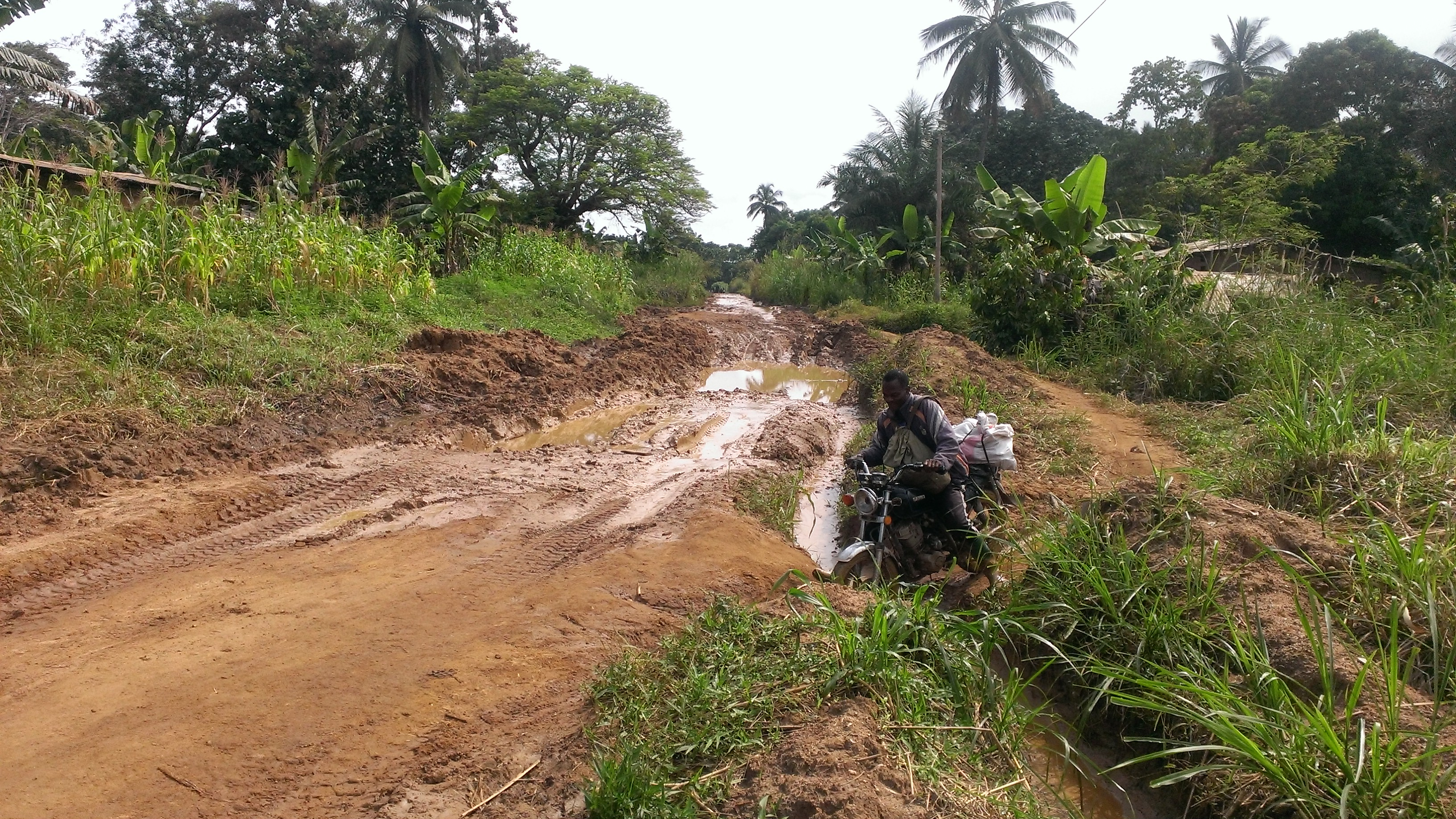
Biatsota-Bafia road
