= Ombessa =

Coordinates: 4°36′N 11°15′E

- Commune and town
- Interactive map of Ombessa
- Country: Cameroon
- Time zone: UTC+1 (WAT)

Ombessa is a town and commune in Mbam-et-Inoubou department of Centre Region in Cameroon.
