= Mbam-et-Inoubou =

- Department
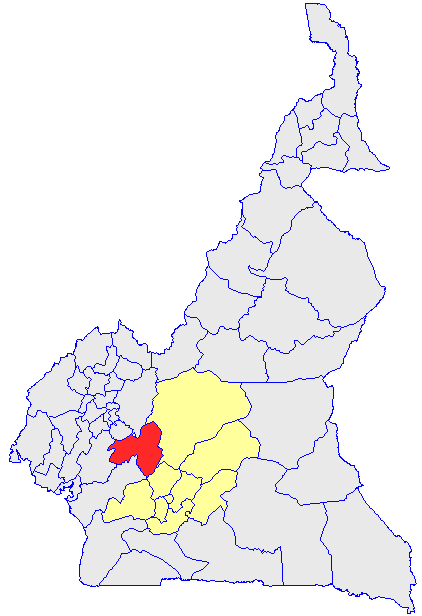
- Department location in Cameroon

- Location within Cameroon Location within Africa
- Country: Cameroon
- Province: Centre Province
- Capital: Bafia

Area
  - Total: 2,751 sq mi (7,125 km^{2})

Population (2001)
  - Total: 153,020
- Time zone: UTC+1 (WAT)

Mbam-et-Inoubou is a department of Centre Province in Cameroon. The department covers an area of 7,125 km^{2} and as of 2001 had a total population of 153,020. The capital of the department lies at Bafia.

== Subdivisions ==
The department is divided administratively into nine communes and in turn into villages.

=== Communes ===
- Bafia
- Bokito
- Deuk
- Kiiki
- Kon-Yambetta
- Makénéné
- Ndikiniméki
- Nitoukou
- Ombessa
