= Mayo-Hourna =

Coordinates: 9°17′N 13°04′E

- Commune and town
- Interactive map of Mayo-Hourna
- Country: Cameroon
- Time zone: UTC+1 (WAT)

Mayo-Hourna is a town and commune in Cameroon.

== See also ==
- Communes of Cameroon
