= Kongso-Bamougoum =

Town in Cameroon

- Commune and town
- Country: Cameroon
- Time zone: UTC+1 (WAT)

Kongso-Bamougoum is a town and commune in Cameroon.

== See also ==
- Communes of Cameroon
