= Guider (Mayo-Rey) =

- Commune and town
- Country: Cameroon
- Time zone: UTC+1 (WAT)

Guider (Mayo-Rey) is a town and commune in Cameroon.

== See also ==
- Communes of Cameroon
